= Groot =

Marvel Comics fictional character

- Groot on the cover of I Am Groot #1. Art by Flaviano Armentaro.

Publication information
- Publisher: Marvel Comics
- First appearance: Tales to Astonish #13 (November 1960)
- Created by: Stan Lee; Larry Lieber; Jack Kirby

In-story information
- Species: Flora colossus
- Team affiliations: Guardians of the Galaxy; S.H.I.E.L.D. Paranormal Containment Unit; Nova Corps
- Partnerships: Rocket Raccoon
- Notable aliases: Monarch of Planet X Seed of Slaughter; Tree
- Abilities: Superhuman strength, stamina, endurance, durability, and senses; Regenerative healing factor; Elasticity/plasticity; Plant manipulation; Immortality

Groot (/ɡruːt/) is a character appearing in American comic books published by Marvel Comics. Created by Stan Lee, Larry Lieber and Jack Kirby, the character first appeared in Tales to Astonish #13 (November 1960). An extraterrestrial, sentient tree-like creature, the original Groot first appeared as an invader that intended to capture humans for experimentation. The character's speech capability is limited to the phrase "I am Groot", which can have different meanings depending on context. In the Marvel Cinematic Universe (MCU) franchise, Star-Lord, Thor, Rocket Raccoon, Gamora, Drax the Destroyer and, eventually, Nebula, daughter of Thanos are able to understand him.

The character was reintroduced as an heroic, noble being in 2006, and appeared in the crossover comic book storyline Annihilation: Conquest. Groot went on to star in its spin-off series, Guardians of the Galaxy, joining the team of the same name.

Groot has been featured in a variety of associated Marvel media, including animated television series, toys and trading cards. Vin Diesel voices Groot in the MCU, starting in the 2014 film Guardians of the Galaxy, with Krystian Godlewski playing the initial incarnation of the character via performance capture and James Gunn doing so for his reborn offspring, colloquially known as "Baby Groot".

== Publication history ==
Groot's first appearance in Tales to Astonish #13

Groot first appeared in Tales to Astonish #13 (Nov. 1960), and was created by Stan Lee, Larry Lieber and Jack Kirby. He appeared again in The Incredible Hulk vol. 2 Annual #5 (Oct. 1976), alongside five other monsters from Marvel's anthology horror comics of the late 1950s and early 1960s. In The Sensational Spider-Man #−1 (July 1997), Groot was featured in a nightmare of the young Peter Parker.

Groot reappeared in 2006 in the six-issue limited series Nick Fury's Howling Commandos and appeared in the Annihilation: Conquest and Annihilation: Conquest – Star-Lord limited series. Groot went on to join the Guardians of the Galaxy in the series of the same name and remained a fixture of the title until its cancellation with issue #25 in 2010. Groot appeared in its follow-up, the limited series The Thanos Imperative, and, alongside fellow Guardian Rocket Raccoon, Groot starred in backup features in Annihilators #1–4 (March–June 2011) and Annihilators: Earthfall #1–4 (Sept.–Dec. 2011).

Groot appeared in issues #6–8 of Avengers Assemble as a member of the Guardians. Groot is one of the stars of Guardians of the Galaxy vol. 3, a part of the Marvel NOW! relaunch.

In March 2015, it was announced that Groot would be getting a solo series by writer Jeff Loveness and artist Brian Kesinger.

The Groot who appeared in Tales to Astonish and the one introduced in Annihilation: Conquest were retroactively established as being separate members of the same species in the sixth and final issue of the Groot ongoing series that launched in June 2015. In Infinity Wars, however, Groot specifically references the fact that during his first visit to the planet Earth, he had promised to "march across the surface of the planet and doom all who dared to oppose Groot". This seemingly reverted the character's origins to having both eras of Groot referencing the same persona, therefore invalidating the retroactive change from issue six of the Groot series.

== Origins ==
Groot is a Flora colossus from Planet X, the capital of the branch worlds. The Flora colossi are tree-like beings whose language is almost impossible to understand due to their stiff larynxes, causing their speech to sound like they are repeating the phrase "I am Groot". Other beings try to be friendly but become angry with the Flora colossi for their apparent inability to speak, though Groot was shown to have been actually speaking not just understandably but eloquently in his language throughout Annihilation: Conquest. The Flora colossi are ruled over by the "Arbor Masters" and teach the children of the species with "Photonic Knowledge", which is the collected knowledge of the Arbor Masters of the generations and is absorbed through photosynthesis; this is a highly advanced education method, making the Flora colossi geniuses.

Groot originated from an "Ennobled Sap-line" and was gifted with a tremendous grasp of quasi-dimensional super-positional engineering. Groot did not get along with fellow saplings but instead preferred the company of the "Maintenance Mammals", against which the other saplings discriminated. Groot was exiled by the "Arbor Masters" in Guardians of the Galaxy #14 after killing another sapling to defend a maintenance mammal it was brutalizing.

An alternate origin was presented in the Groot ongoing series. In the story, it is revealed that the other Flora colossi had been abducting organisms from other planets, including a young human girl named Hannah. After seeing Hannah, Groot realized that what his people were doing was wrong and managed to save the child and send her back to Earth. However, for his disobedience, Groot was exiled from Planet X and forced to wander the universe until he met Rocket Raccoon many decades later, where this version of Groot later became a member of the Guardians of the Galaxy.

== Fictional character biography ==
=== Original Groot ===
Groot is an extraterrestrial tree monster who initially came to Earth seeking humans to capture and study. Groot was seemingly destroyed by termites used by Leslie Evans.

Xemnu made a duplicate of Groot by making a human and tree hybrid that was used to fight the Hulk, but it was destroyed in the battle.

Groot was later revealed to have survived, but was a captive of the Collector and held in his zoo in Canada until Groot and the other captive creatures were freed by the Mole Man. Groot and the other creatures rampaged in New York City until they were stopped by a band of superheroes, and were then dumped through a portal to the Negative Zone.

Groot was later tracked down and captured by S.H.I.E.L.D.'s Paranormal Containment Unit, nicknamed the Howling Commandos, when his tree scent was detected by Sasquatch and Abominable Snowman. While Groot was being held captive, Gorilla-Man talked to Groot about joining the Howling Commandos. When Merlin and his forces attacked the base, the Howling Commandos let Groot and their other captives free, who proceeded to stampede on Merlin's army; Groot was the only one to turn back, offering to join the Howling Commandos. Groot aided the Howling Commandos as they assaulted Merlin's forces.

=== Guardians of the Galaxy's Groot ===
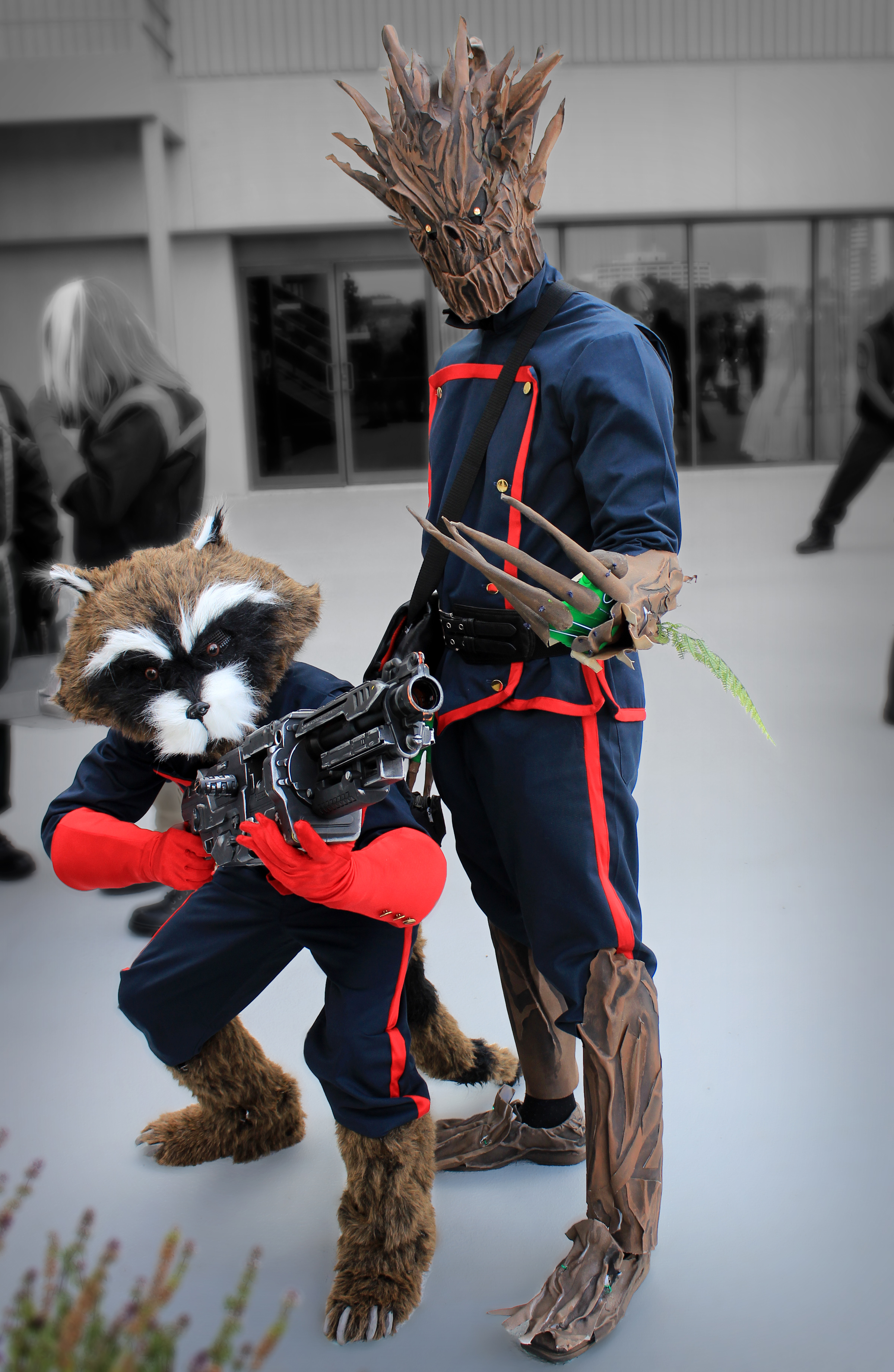
Cosplay of Groot and Rocket Raccoon

A different Groot played a part in Annihilation: Conquest, at which time it was shown Groot may be the last remaining member of the Flora colossi and was under arrest by the Kree for an unknown reason. Groot earned freedom by joining Star-Lord's strike force, where Groot and Rocket Raccoon formed a bond, Rocket being one of the few beings with the ability to understand Groot's language. Star-Lord's team fought their way through the Phalanx, but after the death of Deathcry the team decided to escape through a drainage pipe that Groot could not fit into.

As a consequence of the battle, Groot dies, buying the team some time to escape. A new Groot was created as a sprig offshoot and went on to accompany the team on their continued mission against the Phalanx, but was one of the team members captured by the Phalanx. Groot and the others were freed by Mantis, and escaped back to the lines of the Kree's resistance. In time, Groot's body regenerated from the twig, growing back to full size. Groot and the others intended to carry on as part of Star-Lord's team.

Groot and the team returned to Hala to prepare another assault against the Phalanx, but their agent Blastaar was captured by the Phalanx and taken to their Babel Spire as he tried to carry Groot's pollen spores. Groot and Rocket Raccoon continued their mission by sneaking into the sub-basement of the Babel Spire. When Star-Lord was captured by Ultron, the original plan of laying explosives in the Spire failed, so Rocket Raccoon and Groot needed to come up with a new plan. Groot decided to sprout inside the Spire, growing to colossal size and filling a large portion of the building.

Mantis was able to remix Groot's sap in a way as to make it extremely flammable, and again Groot died for the team, this time by purposefully igniting himself to destroy the Babel Spire. A cutting of Groot was kept by Rocket Raccoon, though, and Groot was again able to regrow. Groot then joined the new Guardians of the Galaxy (or, as Groot would have it, "Groot and Branches"), and began regrowing under the care of Mantis.

When the Guardians reformed, Groot joined with Star-Lord, Rocket Raccoon, Drax the Destroyer and Gamora, whom Groot counted as friends.

During the 2015 Secret Wars storyline, Groot is with the Guardians of the Galaxy when they take part in the incursion between Earth-616 and Earth-1610. Groot and Rocket Raccoon are killed by the Children of Tomorrow. However, when Peter Quill — one of the few survivors of the incursions from Earth-616 — finds himself confronted by Black Swan in the castle of Emperor Doom, he reveals that he has been carrying a small twig of Groot in his pocket ever since the incursion. He slams the twig into the roots of the World Tree, allowing Groot to transform the giant tree into his body. Groot decimates Doom's castle as the surviving heroes mount their final assault.

During the "Civil War II" storyline, Groot and the Guardians of the Galaxy are summoned by Captain Marvel to help her in her fight against Iron Man's side. The resulting battle damaged the Guardians of the Galaxy's ship, stranding them on Earth.

During the "Secret Empire" storyline, Groot and the rest of the Guardians of the Galaxy assist Captain Marvel, the Alpha Flight Space Program, members of the Ultimates, Hyperion, and Quasar in intercepting a fleet of Chitauri that are approaching Earth until a Hydra-aligned Steve Rogers activated the Planetary Defense Shield trapping those fighting the Chitauri outside of Earth's atmosphere. Star-Lord, Rocket Raccoon, and Groot try to enlist representatives of the Skrull, Kree, Brood, Shi'ar and Spartax empires that are on the Galactic Council in helping against the Chitauri hordes and to break down the Planetary Defense Shield and get rid of Hydra. Realizing they are now facing a galaxy without human interference, the Galactic Council refuses aid and attempt to kill the three Guardians as they flee. After the Planetary Defense Shield is shut down, Groot and the Guardians of the Galaxy join the final battle against Hydra.

Rocket Raccoon and Groot are on their way to the Stohlad Ring when they are ambushed by Gardener, who shatters Groot because the Guardians of the Galaxy "corrupted" him and diverted him from his true purpose. Rocket Raccoon escapes with a splinter of Groot, who regrows his body.

During the "Infinity Countdown" storyline, Groot is with the Guardians of the Galaxy when they notice that the planet Telferina is under attack by the Flora colossi that Gardener grew from Groot's splinters. Groot gets close to Gardener and purges the poison that Loki put in him from his body. Gardener repays Groot by using his abilities to restore Groot to his previous size. In addition, Groot can now speak in full sentences and refers to himself in the third person.

== Characterization ==
=== Powers and abilities ===
Groot can absorb wood as food, and has the ability to regenerate. Groot can control trees and plants, using them to attack others, and appears to be resistant to fire. Groot is able to sprout dramatically increasing mass which then severely inhibits movement.

Groot has been seemingly killed on multiple occasions, each time regrowing from a sprig.

=== "I am Groot" ===
Black Bolt's brother Maximus asserted that whenever Groot is saying the trademark "I am Groot!", he has actually been saying a number of things, and his varying inflections of the sentence are the equivalent of words and sentences. People who have interacted with Groot are gradually able to decipher the meaning of the inflections and can carry on full conversations with Groot.

The meaning of the word 'Groot' comes from the Dutch word 'groot' and translates as 'Tall'. The mature form of Groot's species is robust and heavyweight, which causes the organs of acoustic generation to become stiff and inflexible. It is this nature of Groot's larynx that causes people, who are oblivious to the subtle nuances of Flora colossi speech, to misinterpret Groot as merely repeating his name. It could not be determined whether Maximus' claim was true or merely another manifestation of his madness, though Groot genuinely did seem to be assisting Maximus with highly advanced engineering. In All-New X-Men #23, Jean Grey telepathically links with Groot, showing that Groot's thought processes are indeed complex, and the declaration of "I am Groot!" usually represents attempts at highly intelligent communication.

== Cultural impact and legacy ==
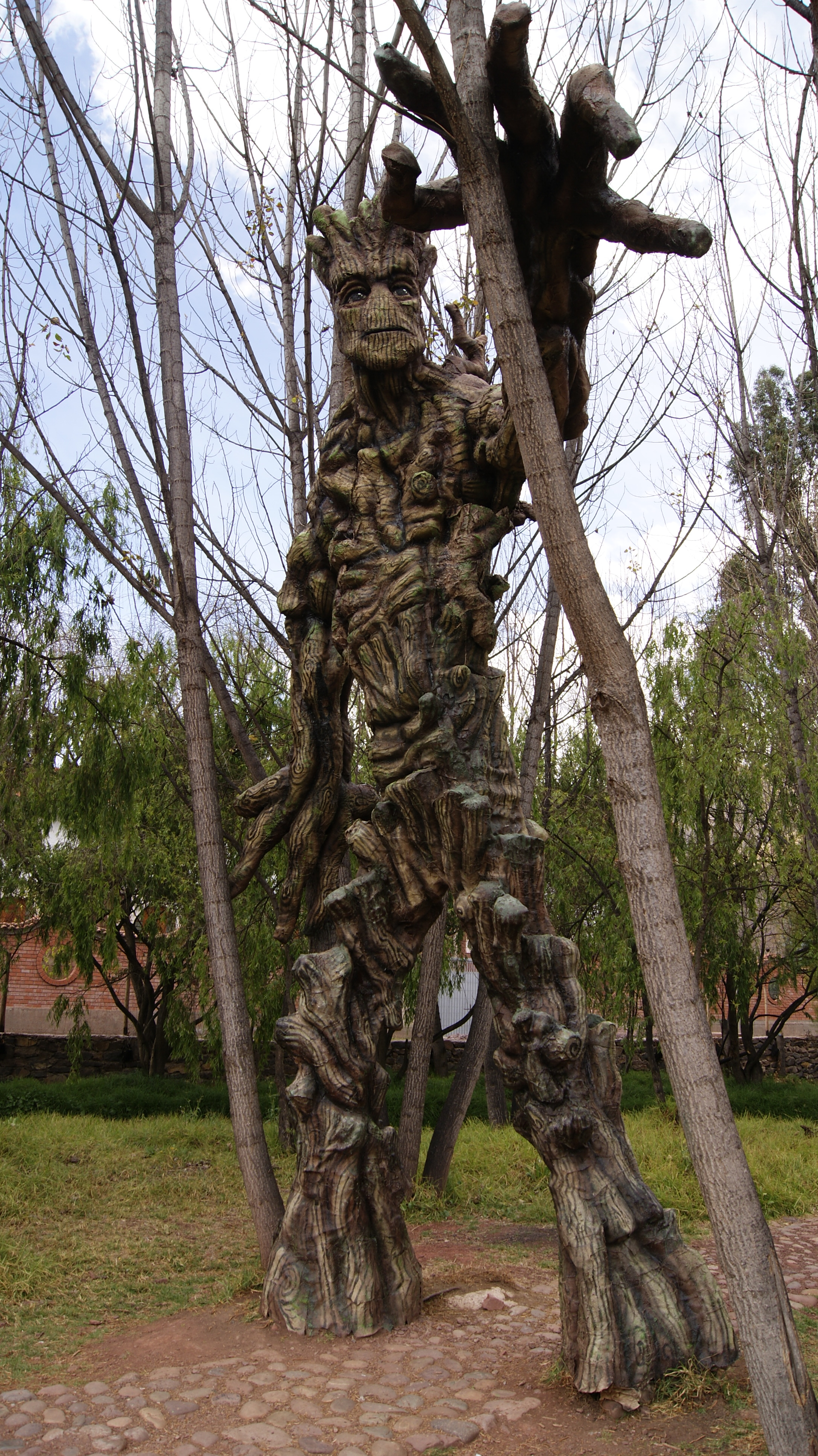
A statue of Groot in Peru

=== Accolades ===
- In 2015, Den of Geek ranked Groot 16th in their "Marvel’s 31 Best Monsters" list.
- In 2018, CBR.com ranked Groot 7th in their "25 Most Powerful Guardians Of The Galaxy" list.
- In 2018, Vanity Fair included Groot in their "Stan Lee’s Most Iconic Characters" list.
- In 2021, Screen Rant ranked Groot 12th in their "20 Most Powerful Guardians Of The Galaxy Members In The Comics" list.
- In 2022, The A.V Club ranked Groot 37th in their "100 best Marvel characters" list.
- In 2022, CBR.com ranked Groot 2nd in their "10 Cutest Marvel Heroes" list.

=== Impact ===
Mike Fenn of The Daily Dot asserted, "The success of the Marvel Cinematic Universe’s latest entry, Guardians of the Galaxy, has resulted in the spread of the Internet’s latest meme: I Am Groot." C. M Crockford of Looper wrote, "Groot quickly became an Internet meme thanks to his simple vocabulary and pleasant nature, with his catchphrase 'I am Groot' spreading into popular culture."

== Literary reception ==
=== Volumes ===
==== Groot - 2015 ====
According to Diamond Comic Distributors, Groot #1 was the 10th best selling comic book in June 2015.

==== Rocket Raccoon and Groot - 2016 ====
According to Diamond Comic Distributors, Rocket Raccoon and Groot #1 was the 15th best-selling comic book in January 2016.

Jesse Schedeen of IGN gave Rocket Raccoon and Groot #1 a grade of 7.8 out of 10, writing, "This new series may not feel terribly "all-new" or "all-different," but it features a proven creative team exploring the continued misadventures of Rocket and Groot. It's tough to go wrong with that. Unlike some Guardians comics, this series quickly finds its niche and promises interesting wrinkles to come for both characters."

==== I Am Groot - 2017 ====
According to Diamond Comic Distributors, I Am Groot #1 was the 71st best-selling comic book in May 2017.

Alexander Jones of Comics Beat called I Am Groot #1 a "charming, colorful tale," saying, "Thankfully, I Am Groot is the beginning of something good. All the pieces are there story-wise, art-wise, and character-wise. Now the task is the new journey we’re taking with some ink and paper friends. Fans of the movies and fans of the original comics will find much to appreciate with this issue. Time to blast up the jams on your old cassette tape deck and enjoy with a smile." Baltimore Lauren of Bleeding Cool asserted, "Hastings delivers a strong narrative with the small tree creature-slash-assassin. Despite only speaking three words, he does inflect great emotion through Groot."

== In other media ==
=== Television ===
- Groot makes a cameo appearance in The Super Hero Squad Show episode "This Man-Thing, This Monster! (Six Against Infinity, Part 3)".
- Groot appears in The Avengers: Earth's Mightiest Heroes episode "Michael Korvac", voiced by Troy Baker.
- Groot appears in Ultimate Spider-Man, voiced initially by Michael Clarke Duncan and subsequently by Kevin Michael Richardson following Duncan's death.
  - Additionally, an alternate reality version of Groot appears in the episode "Return to the Spider-Verse" as Captain Web Beard's sentient pirate ship, the Groot.
- Groot appears in Avengers Assemble, voiced again by Kevin Michael Richardson.
- Groot appears in Hulk and the Agents of S.M.A.S.H., voiced again by Kevin Michael Richardson.
- Groot appears in Marvel Disk Wars: The Avengers, voiced by Masato Funaki in Japanese and John Eric Bentley in English.
- Groot appears in Guardians of the Galaxy (2015), voiced again by Kevin Michael Richardson. This version's home planet was invaded by Ronan the Accuser, leaving Groot the last living Flora colossus. Subsequently, he is captured and held on Halfworld before escaping with Rocket Raccoon. In the present, Star-Lord has a vision of the Flora colossi, which eventually leads to them being resurrected.
- Groot appears in Marvel Super Hero Adventures: Frost Fight!, voiced again by Kevin Michael Richardson.
- Groot appears in Rocket & Groot, voiced again by Kevin Michael Richardson.
- Groot appears in Lego Marvel Super Heroes - Guardians of the Galaxy: The Thanos Threat, voiced again by Kevin Michael Richardson.
- Groot appears in Spider-Man, voiced by Connor Andrade.
- Groot appears in Lego Marvel Avengers: Mission Demolition, voiced again by Kevin Michael Richardson.
- Groot will appear in Spidey and His Amazing Friends, voiced again by Kevin Michael Richardson.

=== Marvel Cinematic Universe ===
Two distinct incarnations of Groot appear in media set in the Marvel Cinematic Universe (MCU), both voiced by Vin Diesel, who also provided motion capture for the character and voice work for some foreign dubs. Additionally, Fred Tatasciore voices an alternate universe variant of Groot in the What If...? episode "What If... Nebula Joined the Nova Corps?".

=== Film ===
Baby Groot appears in Ralph Breaks the Internet, voiced again by Vin Diesel.

=== Video games ===
- Groot appears as a playable character in Marvel Avengers Alliance.
- Groot appears as an assist character for Rocket Raccoon and a "team-up hero" in Marvel Heroes.
- Two incarnations of Groot and Rocket Raccoon appear as hybrid playable characters in Marvel Puzzle Quest.
- Groot appears as a playable character in Lego Marvel Super Heroes, voiced again by Troy Baker.
- Groot appears as a playable character in Disney Infinity 2.0, voiced again by Kevin Michael Richardson.
- An alternate universe variant of Groot named King Groot appears as a playable character in Marvel Contest of Champions.
- Groot appears as a playable character in Marvel: Future Fight.
- Groot appears as a playable character in Disney Infinity 3.0, voiced again by Kevin Michael Richardson.
- Groot appears in Guardians of the Galaxy: The Telltale Series, voiced by Adam Harrington.
- Groot appears as a playable character in Lego Marvel Super Heroes 2, voiced by Stefan Ashton Frank. Additionally, Small Groot (based on Baby Groot from Guardians of the Galaxy Vol. 2) and Small Groot with a Ravager uniform appear as different variations.
- Groot appears as an assist character for Rocket Raccoon in Marvel vs. Capcom: Infinite, voiced again by Kevin Michael Richardson.
- Groot appears as a playable character in Marvel Strike Force.
- Groot appears in Marvel Powers United VR, voiced by Kevin Grevioux.
- Groot appears as a playable character in Marvel Ultimate Alliance 3: The Black Order, voiced again by Adam Harrington.
- Groot appears in Fortnite Battle Royale, voiced again by Adam Harrington.
- Groot appears in Marvel's Guardians of the Galaxy, voiced by Robert Montcalm.
- Groot appears in Marvel Snap.
- Groot appears as a playable character in Marvel Rivals, voiced again by Adam Harrington.

=== Merchandise ===
- A Groot action figure was released in the Marvel Universe toyline as part of a Guardians of the Galaxy pack.
- A Rocket Raccoon and Groot figure set with a "Dancing Baby Groot" was released by Hot Toys.
- Funko announced a "Dancing Groot Funko POP" vinyl figure on August 26, 2014 and released it shortly after Christmas 2014.
- Groot received multiple figures in the HeroClix line.

=== Miscellaneous ===
- The MCU incarnation of Groot and Baby Groot appear in Guardians of the Galaxy – Mission: Breakout!, with the latter voiced by Fred Tatasciore.
- Groot appears in Marvel Battleworld: Mystery of the Thanostones, voiced by Brad Swaile.
- In 2014, Twilio employee Ricky Robinett set up a phone number for individuals to text Groot: (866) 740–4531.

== Collected editions ==
Title	Material Collected	Publication Date	ISBN
Rocket Raccoon & Groot: The Complete Collection	Rocket Raccoon (vol. 1) #1–4, The Incredible Hulk #271 and material from Tales to Astonish (vol. 1) #13, Marvel Preview #7, Annihilators #1–4, Annihilators: Earthfall #1–4	April 10, 2013	978-0785167136
Groot	Groot (2015) #1–6	January 27, 2016	978-0785195528
Rocket Raccoon & Groot Vol. 0: Bite and Bark	Rocket Raccoon (vol. 2) #1–11, Groot (2015) #1–6, and material from Guardians of the Galaxy: Tomorrow's Avengers #1	September 21, 2016	978-1302902186
Rocket Raccoon & Groot Vol. 1: Tricks of the Trade	Rocket Raccoon & Groot #1–6	July 20, 2016	978-0785199731
Rocket Raccoon & Groot Vol. 2: Civil War II	Rocket Raccoon & Groot #7–10	November 9, 2016	978-0785199748
Rocket Raccoon & Groot: Tall Tails	Rocket Raccoon & Groot #1–10	March 11, 2020	978-1302921156
I Am Groot	I Am Groot #1–5	December 5, 2017	978-1302908546
Marvel-Verse: Rocket & Groot	The Incredible Hulk #271, Free Comic Book Day 2014 (Rocket Raccoon) #1, Rocket Raccoon (2014) #5, Groot (2015) #6, Rocket Raccoon & Groot #4, and material from A Year of Marvels: The Unbeatable	April 19, 2023	978-1302950729
Groot: Uprooted	Groot (2023) #1–4	November 29, 2023	978-1302953188

== See also ==
- List of Marvel Comics superhero debuts
