= Rocket & Groot =

- Genre: Superhero
- Based on: Rocket Raccoon by: Bill Mantlo; Keith Giffen; Groot by: Stan Lee; Larry Lieber; Jack Kirby
- Written by: Kevin Burke & Chris "Doc" Wyatt
- Directed by: Arnauld Delord
- Voices of: Trevor Devall; Kevin Michael Richardson
- Composer: Guy Michelmore
- Country of origin: United States
- Original language: English
- No. of seasons: 1
- No. of episodes: 12

Production
- Executive producers: Alan Fine; Joe Quesada; Dan Buckley; Cort Lane
- Producer: Cara Speller
- Editor: Maggie Maciejczek
- Running time: 2 minutes
- Production companies: Passion Animation Studios; Marvel Animation

Original release
- Network: Disney XD
- Release: March 10 – May 1, 2017

Rocket & Groot is an American animated television series based on comics published by Marvel Comics. The series features the characters Rocket Raccoon and Groot. It premiered on April 10, 2017, on Disney XD.

== Plot ==
Rocket Raccoon and Groot encounter travel problems and attempt to raise money to fix their broken ship.

== Characters ==
- Rocket Raccoon (voiced by Trevor Devall)
- Groot (voiced by Kevin Michael Richardson)
- Broker (voiced by Charlie Adler)
- Maitre D (voiced by Charlie Adler)
- Space Phantom (voiced by Kevin Michael Richardson)

Additional characters are voiced by Susanne Blakeslee and Sam Riegel.

== Production ==
The Disney XD channel was interested in creating short-form media with Marvel characters. Rocket & Groot was created by Marvel Animation and Passion Animation Studios with animation done by Blue Spirit Studio and compositing done by Fortiche Production in France.

== Release ==
The complete series aired on Disney XD on April 10, 2017.

== Reception ==
=== Critical response ===
Ethan Anderton of SlashFilm praised the animation and character designs of Rocket & Groot. Emily Ashby of Common Sense Media gave the series a grade of three out of five stars, noting the presence of positive messages and role models, and called the show a "best fit for "Guardians" fans."

=== Accolades ===
Rocket & Groot was nominated for Outstanding Short Form Animated Program at the 2017 Primetime Emmy Awards.
