= Rocket Raccoon =

Marvel Comics fictional character

- Rocket Raccoon taken from the cover of the first issue of the character's eponymous series (July 2014). Art by Rafael Albuquerque.

Publication information
- Publisher: Marvel Comics
- First appearance: Marvel Preview #7 (July 1976)
- Created by: Bill Mantlo; Keith Giffen

In-story information
- Species: Halfworlder raccoon mutate
- Place of origin: Halfworld
- Team affiliations: Guardians of the Galaxy; Avengers; Nova Corps
- Partnerships: Groot
- Notable aliases: Rocky Raccoon; Ranger Rocket
- Abilities: Enhanced raccoon physiology granting: Superior speed, mobility, agility, reflexes, and senses; Genius-level intellect; Skilled marksman and hand-to-hand combatant; Master tactician and field commander; Accomplished starship aviator

Rocket Raccoon is a character appearing in American comic books published by Marvel Comics. Created by writer Bill Mantlo and artist Keith Giffen, the character first appeared in Marvel Preview #7 (July 1976). He is an intelligent anthropomorphic raccoon who is an expert marksman, weapon specialist, and master tactician. His name and aspects of his character were inspired by the Beatles' 1968 song "Rocky Raccoon". Rocket Raccoon appeared as a prominent member in the 2008 relaunch of the superhero team Guardians of the Galaxy.

The character has appeared in several media adaptations as a member of that team, including animated television series, toys, and video games. Bradley Cooper voices Rocket in the Marvel Cinematic Universe films Guardians of the Galaxy (2014), Guardians of the Galaxy Vol. 2 (2017), Avengers: Infinity War (2018), Avengers: Endgame (2019), Thor: Love and Thunder, The Guardians of the Galaxy Holiday Special (both 2022), and Guardians of the Galaxy Vol. 3 (2023).

== Publication history ==
The character was created by Bill Mantlo and Keith Giffen, inspired by the Beatles song "Rocky Raccoon". Other references to the song were featured in Rocket's appearance in The Incredible Hulk #271 (May 1982), which was titled "Now Somewhere In the Black Holes of Sirius Major There Lived a Young Boy Named Rocket Raccoon" and saw the Hulk help Rocket stop a villain trying to steal "Gideon's Bible", which in the Marvel Universe was a book that contained the sum of all knowledge on the Loonies colony.

Rocket Raccoon first appeared in Marvel Preview #7 (Summer 1976) in the back-up feature "Prince Wayfinder: The Sword in the Star", where he was called "Rocky". In this appearance the character spoke using stock British English phrases such as "bloody well," "old bean," "jolly good," etc., which did not continue in later appearances. He next appeared in The Incredible Hulk #271 (May 1982), where it is learned that "Rocky" is short for "Rocket". In 1985, he received his own four-issue limited series and, in an afterword to the first issue, Mantlo asserted that this was the same character seen in Preview, penciled by Mike Mignola and inked by Al Gordon with Al Milgrom. Rocket appeared in Quasar #15 in 1990 and later appeared in three issues of Sensational She-Hulk in 1992 (#44–46). The character only appeared in a total of ten comic books in his first thirty years of existence.

Besides a brief appearance in a 2006 issue of Exiles, Rocket Raccoon was next seen in 2007's Annihilation: Conquest and Annihilation: Conquest - Star-Lord limited series, and their spin-off series, a new volume of Guardians of the Galaxy. He remained a regular member of the series cast until it was canceled with issue #25 in 2010, also appearing in the follow-up limited series The Thanos Imperative. Along with fellow Guardian Groot, Rocket starred in backup features in Annihilators #1–4 (May 2011 – August 2011) and Annihilators: Earthfall #1–4 (November 2011 – February 2012 ).

Rocket Raccoon, along with the other members of the Guardians, appeared in issues #4-8 of Avengers Assemble, a series intended as a jumping-on point for fans of the film The Avengers. He appears prominently in Guardians of the Galaxy vol. 3, a part of the 2012 Marvel NOW! relaunch.

In February 2014, it was announced that Skottie Young would write and illustrate a Rocket Raccoon ongoing series. The series began in July 2014, with the first issue selling over 300,000 copies. Jake Parker replaced Young as the artist beginning with issue #5. The series ended in May 2015 as one of many titles to be cancelled for Marvel's Secret Wars event. A new volume, titled Rocket Raccoon and Groot, began in January 2016 as part of the All-New, All-Different Marvel relaunch.

== Fictional character biography ==
Rocket Raccoon #1 (May 1985). Cover art by Mike Mignola and Al Gordon.

Rocket Raccoon is the "Guardian of the Keystone Quadrant", an area of outer space sealed off from the rest of the cosmos by the Galacian Wall. Rocket is captain of the starship Rack 'n' Ruin, and he and his first mate Wal Rus come from the planet Halfworld in the Keystone Quadrant, an abandoned colony for the mentally ill whose animals were transformed into anthropomorphic forms to care for the inmates. Rocket was Halfworld's chief law officer ("ranger"), who protected it from various threats.

At one point, Judson Jakes tried to steal the Halfworld Bible, but was thwarted by Rocket and various animal associates. Later, Lord Dyvyne abducted Rocket's friend Lylla Otter, and Jakes began the Toy War. As the Toy War continued, Blackjack O'Hare teamed up with Rocket, and Rocket was reunited with Lylla. The Rack 'n' Ruin was soon destroyed, as Judson Jakes and Lord Dyvyne teamed up to kill Rocket Raccoon. Rocket Raccoon and his friends cured the Loonies of their mental illnesses, as Judson Jakes and Lord Dyvyne were apparently killed. Rocket and the animals as well as the robots left Halfworld and took off into space for their own adventures. Some time later, Rocket was revealed to have been a laboratory subject on the Stranger's planet, and escaped his captivity there.

=== Guardians of the Galaxy ===
Rocket Raccoon resurfaced as a member of the team chosen to accompany Star-Lord on his mission to stop a Phalanx infiltration of the Kree homeworld. Rocket is depicted as a gifted military tactician who is fearless, loyal, and insightful. It is heavily implied that he has obsessive–compulsive disorder. Rocket's trademark rocket skates are absent.

Rocket joins the new Guardians of the Galaxy at the behest of his friend Star-Lord. It is he who suggests that the team adopt that moniker after hearing it mentioned by Major Victory. Later, when the team almost disbands and Peter Quill (Star-Lord) disappears (sent into the Negative Zone by Ronan), Rocket keeps the team alive, and brings in Groot as a member, as they had become firm friends. Rocket takes over as leader until they rescue Peter and save the Earth from an alien invasion. When the team tries to halt the growing War of Kings, Rocket leads the portion of the team assigned to make contact with the Shi'ar. They are unable to teleport into Emperor Vulcan's flagship and have to be rescued by the Starjammers and Rocket's old friend Ch'od. They bring back the rightful queen of the Shi'ar, but she is killed after Rocket departs, much to his horror.

After the Guardians disband, Rocket Raccoon takes up a normal job with Timely Inc. He and Groot were reunited and tricked into returning to Halfworld: there, he found that his memories of the place were mostly half-truths and deliberately crafted fake memories. In reality, Jakes and Blackjack O'Hare had worked with Rocket in providing security at Halfworld Asylum for the Criminally Insane; Doctor Dyvyne had been Head of Psychology there; and both the anthropomorphic animals and the automaton clowns were deliberately created to work at the asylum, as their appearance would calm the inmates. The crises that Rocket remembered had been caused by the psychic supervillain the Star Thief, who had been admitted as an inmate and used his psychic powers to turn the inhabitants against each other. Rocket had turned the warders into a biological "key" to keep Star-Thief locked up, and deliberately altered his mind and left Halfworld so it could never be opened - but he was tricked into returning by the Thief, whose mind had escaped into the asylum after his host body died.

When the Guardians of the Galaxy title was relaunched in 2013, Rocket was again a member of the team.

In the first issue of Secret Wars, the Guardians of the Galaxy take part in the incursion between Earth-616 and Earth-1610, during which Rocket and Groot are killed by the Children of Tomorrow.

=== All-New, All-Different Marvel ===
In All-New, All-Different Marvel, Rocket Raccoon takes leadership of the Guardians of the Galaxy while Star-Lord is busy on Spartax.

During the crisis in Avengers: No Road Home, when the dark goddess Nyx threatens to destroy all light in the universe, Rocket is one of the heroes who are inadvertently assembled to fight her, including Hawkeye, Hercules, Hulk, the Scarlet Witch, Spectrum, the Vision, Voyager, and Conan the Barbarian. Once Nyx is defeated, Rocket muses that this would allow him to cross "being an Avenger" off his bucket list.

== Powers and abilities ==
Rocket has a heightened sense of smell, sight, hearing and touch. His claws allow him to scale walls, buildings and trees. He is an accomplished starship pilot, a skilled engineer and technician as well as an expert marksman with an affinity for heavy weapons. He is a skilled military tactician and leader, attributes that help him take charge of the Guardians of the Galaxy.

== Reception ==
=== Critical reception ===
Dominic Lerose of The Daily Cardinal called Rocket Raccoon a "top fan favorite," writing, "Rocket is the only surviving member of the Guardians of the Galaxy after Thanos' snap for good reason. He's the most interesting out of them all, the most emotionally vulnerable and a character audiences love not only for his cuteness and humor, but for his saddened soul and desire to fit into the dramatic universe of Marvel. Let's hope we get to see a lot of Rocket Raccoon in Avengers: Endgame next month, and let's hope he makes it out alive so we can see more of him in the future."

=== Accolades ===
- In 2014, Comic Book Resources (CBR) included Rocket Raccoon in their "Marvel and DC's Greatest Animal Characters" list.
- In 2018, CBR ranked Rocket Raccoon 25th in their "25 Most Powerful Guardians Of The Galaxy" list.
- In 2021, Screen Rant ranked Rocket Raccoon 19th in their "20 Most Powerful Guardians Of The Galaxy Members In The Comics" list.
- In 2022, The A.V Club ranked Rocket Raccoon 44th in their "100 best Marvel characters" list.

== Literary reception ==
=== Volumes ===
==== Rocket Raccoon (2014) ====
According to Diamond Comic Distributors, Rocket Raccoon #1 was the best selling comic book in July 2014.

Jeff Lake of IGN gave Rocket Raccoon #1 a grade of 8.7 out of 10, writing, "In Rocket Raccoon #1, Skottie Young proves a quality storyteller behind the pages and on them. Though the plot is a little barebones for now, Young imbues the script with enough energy to keep it going, his amazing visuals doing the rest. Rocket's fan base will only grow in the coming months, and. Young appears well suited to do him justice."

==== Rocket Raccoon and Groot (2016) ====
According to Diamond Comic Distributors, Rocket Raccoon and Groot #1 was the 15th best selling comic book in January 2016.

Jesse Schedeen of IGN gave Rocket Raccoon and Groot #1 a grade of 7.8 out of 10, writing, "This new series may not feel terribly "all-new" or "all-different," but it features a proven creative team exploring the continued misadventures of Rocket and Groot. It's tough to go wrong with that. Unlike some Guardians comics, this series quickly finds its niche and promises interesting wrinkles to come for both characters."

==== Rocket Raccoon (2016) ====
According to Diamond Comic Distributors, Rocket Raccoon #1 was the 29th best selling comic book in December 2016.

== Supporting characters ==
Characters supporting Rocket include:

- Blackjack O'Hare - An anthropomorphic hare and mercenary.
- Lylla - An anthropomorphic otter.
- Pyko - An anthropomorphic turtle.
- Stinker - An anthropomorphic skunk.
- Wal Rus - An anthropomorphic walrus.

== Enemies ==
Rocket Raccoon had enemies of his own in his comic series, including:

- Black Bunny Brigade - A group of mercenary rabbits led by Blackjack.
- Judson Jakes - An anthropomorphic mole who runs the Halfworld Asylum for the Criminally Insane.
- Lord Dyvyne - An anthropomorphic lizard and businessman.

== In other media ==
=== Television ===
- Rocket Raccoon appears in The Avengers: Earth's Mightiest Heroes episode "Michael Korvac", voiced by Greg Ellis.
- Rocket Raccoon appears in Ultimate Spider-Man, voiced initially by Billy West and subsequently by Trevor Devall. This version is a member of the Guardians of the Galaxy and served as one of Sam Alexander's trainers.
  - Additionally, a pirate-themed alternate reality version of Rocket appears in the episode "Return to the Spider-Verse" Pt. 2.
- Rocket Raccoon appears in Avengers Assemble, voiced by Seth Green in the episode "Guardians and Space Knights" and again by Trevor Devall in "Widow's Run".
- Rocket Raccoon appears in the Hulk and the Agents of S.M.A.S.H. episode "It's a Wonderful Smash", voiced again by Seth Green.
- Rocket Raccoon appears in Guardians of the Galaxy (2015), voiced again by Trevor Devall. This version, also known by the label 89P13, was created by the robots of Halfworld before escaping with Groot and joining the Guardians of the Galaxy. Additionally, Rocket has an unnamed mother and sister (both voiced by Pamela Adlon) and a brother, Ranger (also voiced by Devall), who were originally anthropomorphic before being devolved and relocated to Planet Y.
- Rocket Raccoon appears in Marvel Super Hero Adventures: Frost Fight!, voiced again by Trevor Devall.
- Rocket Raccoon appears in Marvel Super Hero Adventures, voiced again by Trevor Devall.
- Rocket Raccoon appears in Rocket & Groot, voiced again by Trevor Devall.
- Rocket Raccoon appears in Lego Marvel Super Heroes - Guardians of the Galaxy: The Thanos Threat, voiced again by Trevor Devall.
- Rocket Raccoon appears in Marvel Disk Wars: The Avengers, voiced by Fumihiro Okabayashi in the Japanese version and Dave Wittenberg in the English version.
- Rocket Raccoon appears in Lego Marvel Avengers: Mission Demolition, voiced again by Trevor Devall.
- Rocket Raccoon will appear in Spidey and His Amazing Friends, voiced again by Trevor Devall.

=== Marvel Cinematic Universe ===
Rocket appears in media set in the Marvel Cinematic Universe, voiced by Bradley Cooper, with on-set acting by Sean Gunn. This version, also known by the label 89P13, was created by the High Evolutionary and possesses cybernetic implants.

=== Video games ===
- Rocket Raccoon appears as a playable character in Marvel Super Hero Squad Online.
- Rocket Raccoon appears as a playable character in Ultimate Marvel vs. Capcom 3, voiced again by Greg Ellis.
- Rocket Raccoon appears as a playable character in Marvel Avengers Alliance.
- Rocket Raccoon appears as a playable character in Marvel Heroes, voiced by Steve Blum.
- Two incarnations of Rocket Raccoon and Groot appear as hybrid playable characters in Marvel Puzzle Quest.
- Rocket Raccoon appears as a playable character in Lego Marvel Super Heroes, voiced by John DiMaggio.
- Rocket Raccoon appears as a playable character in Disney Infinity 2.0, voiced by Nolan North.
- Rocket Raccoon appears as a playable character in Marvel Contest of Champions.
- Rocket Raccoon appears as a playable character in Marvel: Future Fight.
- Rocket Raccoon appears as a playable character in Disney Infinity 3.0.
- Rocket Raccoon appears in Guardians of the Galaxy: The Telltale Series, voiced again by Nolan North.
- Rocket Raccoon appears as a playable character in Lego Marvel Super Heroes 2, voiced by Mikey O'Connor.
- Rocket Raccoon appears as a playable character in Marvel vs. Capcom: Infinite, voiced again by Trevor Devall.
- Rocket Raccoon appears as a playable character in Marvel Ultimate Alliance 3: The Black Order, voiced again by Nolan North.
- Rocket Raccoon appears as a playable character in Marvel Powers United VR, voiced again by Trevor Devall.
- Rocket Raccoon appears in Fortnite Battle Royale.
- Rocket Raccoon appears as an NPC in Marvel Future Revolution, voiced again by Nolan North. This version is a member of Omega Flight.
- Rocket Raccoon appears in Marvel's Guardians of the Galaxy, voiced by Alex Weiner. This version was created by the Kree and suffers from aquaphobia due to their experiments on him.
- Rocket Raccoon appears in Marvel Snap.
- Rocket Raccoon appears as a playable character in Marvel Rivals.
- Rocket Raccoon appears as a playable character in Marvel Cosmic Invasion, voiced again by Trevor Devall.

=== Merchandise ===
- A Rocket Raccoon action figure was available as part of a Guardians of the Galaxy three pack in 2011 as part of the Marvel Universe toyline.
- A Rocket Raccoon received a figure in a Marvel Legends Build-A-Figure line.
- A Rocket Raccoon and Groot figure set with a "Dancing Baby Groot" was released by Hot Toys.

=== Miscellaneous ===
- Rocket Raccoon appears in The Amazing Spider-Man.
- Rocket appears in Guardians of the Galaxy – Mission: Breakout!, voiced again by Bradley Cooper.
- Rocket Raccoon appears in Marvel's Wastelanders: Old Man Star-Lord, voiced by Chris Elliott.

== Collected editions ==
Title	Material Collected	Publication Date	ISBN
Rocket Raccoon: Guardian of the Keystone Quadrant	The Incredible Hulk #271, Rocket Raccoon (vol. 1) #1–4 and material from Marvel Preview #7	August 3, 2011	978-0785155270
Rocket Raccoon & Groot: The Complete Collection	The Incredible Hulk #271, Rocket Raccoon (vol. 1) #1–4 and material from Marvel Preview #7, Annihilators #1–4, Annihilators: Earthfall #1–4, Tales to Astonish (vol. 1) #13	April 10, 2013	978-0785167136
Rocket Raccoon: A Chasing Tale	Rocket Raccoon (vol. 2) #1-6	October 14, 2015	978-0785193890
Rocket Raccoon: Storytailer	Rocket Raccoon (vol. 2) #7-11	March 23, 2016	978-0785193906
Rocket Raccoon & Groot: Bite and Bark	Rocket Raccoon (vol. 2) #1-11, Groot #1-6, and material from Guardians of the Galaxy: Tomorrow's Avengers #1	September 21, 2016	978-1302902186
Rocket Raccoon & Groot: Tricks of the Trade	Rocket Raccoon & Groot #1-6	July 20, 2016	978-0785199731
Rocket Raccoon & Groot: Civil War II	Rocket Raccoon & Groot #7-10	November 9, 2016	978-0785199748
Rocket Raccoon and Groot: Tall Tails	Rocket Raccoon and Groot #1-10	March 11, 2020	978-1302921156
Rocket Raccoon: Grounded	Rocket Raccoon (vol. 3) #1-5	June 20, 2017	978-1302906795
Rocket: The Blue River Score	Rocket #1-6	December 13, 2017	978-1302905507
