= Guardians of the Galaxy (2008 team) =

Fictional superhero team appearing in Marvel Comics

- Promotional image for Guardians of the Galaxy (vol. 2) #1 (May 2008); Art by Clint Langley depicting Star-Lord, Rocket Raccoon, Drax the Destroyer, Gamora, Adam Warlock and Phyla-Vell.

Group publication information
- Publisher: Marvel Comics
- First appearance: Annihilation: Conquest #6 (April 2008)
- Created by: Dan Abnett; Andy Lanning

In-story information
- Type of organization: Superhero team
- Base(s): Knowhere
- Leader(s): Star-Lord
- Agent(s): Groot; Rocket Raccoon; Gamora; Drax the Destroyer; Phyla-Vell; Mantis; Moondragon; Marvel Boy (Noh-Varr); Nova (Richard Rider)

Roster
- See: List of Guardians of the Galaxy members

Guardians of the Galaxy

Series publication information
- Schedule: Monthly
- Format: Ongoing series
- Publication date: (Volume 2); July 2008 – June 2010 (Volume 3); May 2013 – July 2015 (Volume 4); December 2015 – June 2017 (All-New Guardians of the Galaxy); July – December 2017 (Volume 5); March 2019 – February 2020 (Volume 6); March 2020 – November 2021 (Volume 7); June 2023 – March 2024
- Number of issues: (Volume 2) 25 (Volume 3) 28 (Volume 4) 20 (All-New Guardians of the Galaxy) 12 (Volume 5) 12 (Volume 6) 18 (Volume 7) 10
- Creator(s): Dan Abnett; Andy Lanning

The Guardians of the Galaxy are a superhero team appearing in American comic books published by Marvel Comics. Dan Abnett and Andy Lanning formed the team from existing and previously unrelated characters created by a variety of writers and artists, with an initial roster of Star-Lord, Rocket Raccoon, Groot, Gamora, Drax the Destroyer, Adam Warlock, and Phyla-Vell. They first appeared in Annihilation: Conquest #6 (April 2008).

A feature film set in the Marvel Cinematic Universe based on this team was released in 2014. A sequel, titled Guardians of the Galaxy Vol. 2, was released in 2017, and the team has also been featured in the crossover films Avengers: Infinity War (2018), Avengers: Endgame (2019) and Thor: Love and Thunder, as well as the Disney+ The Guardians of the Galaxy Holiday Special (both 2022) and Guardians of the Galaxy Vol. 3 (2023).

This Guardians team is the second to operate under the name, following the original team created by Arnold Drake, Roy Thomas and Stan Lee in 1969.

== Publication history ==
The second volume of the title was published in May 2008, written by Dan Abnett and Andy Lanning and featured a new team of characters from the Annihilation: Conquest storyline.

Abnett and Lanning's work on the Annihilation: Conquest story laid the foundation for the new Guardians of the Galaxy book that they had been wanting to launch for some time. Editor Bill Rosemann, who had also edited Annihilation: Conquest, provided more background: "As the planning of 'Annihilation: Conquest' came together, it occurred to us that, if things went well, there would be a group of characters left standing who would make for a very interesting and fun team." It also provided the motivation the team would need, as "on the heels of two back-to-back wars, they're out to prevent any new Annihilation-size disasters from erupting."

The title ran parallel with Nova vol. 4, which was also written by Abnett and Lanning. The two crossed over in the storylines "War of Kings" and "Realm of Kings". Paul Pelletier pencilled the first seven issues. Brad Walker and Wes Craig alternated pencilling tasks from #8 to #25.

The book was canceled in April 2010 with issue 25. Some plot threads were concluded in The Thanos Imperative 1–6 and its two one-shots (May 2010 – Jan 2011).

The team appeared reassembled in Avengers Assemble #4–8 (June–October 2012).

The Guardians of the Galaxy appeared in a series for the 2012 Marvel NOW! branding, starting with issue 0.1 written by Brian Michael Bendis and drawn by Steve McNiven, which saw Iron Man join the team. Later issues of the series saw Angela, Agent Venom, and Captain Marvel join.

In 2014, to tie into the feature film, Marvel debuted Legendary Star-Lord, a solo series written by Sam Humphries, and a Rocket Raccoon solo series. The following year saw a solo Groot miniseries written by Jeff Loveness.

Guardians of the Galaxy was relaunched as part of the 2015 All-New, All-Different Marvel initiative with Brian Michael Bendis and Valerio Schiti returning as writer and artist respectively. The series sees Peter Quill and Gamora leaving the team, and Rocket becoming the new team's self-appointed leader, also two new characters were added to the team. Kitty Pryde (taking up the mantle of Star-Lord) and the Thing. As part of the same initiative, Star-Lord starred in a 2015 solo series again written by Humphries, while Drax and Gamora starred in their own individual solo series written by CM Punk and Nicole Perlman, respectively.

== Team history ==
In the aftermath of the Phalanx invasion of the Kree, Star-Lord decides to form a team of interstellar heroes that will be proactive in protecting the galaxy, rather than reacting to crises as they happen. To this end, he recruits Adam Warlock, Drax the Destroyer, Gamora, Phyla-Vell (the new Quasar), Rocket Raccoon, and Groot, with Mantis as support staff. On the recommendation of their ally, Nova, the group establishes a base of operations on the space station Knowhere, which possesses a teleportation system with near-universal range. An intelligent, telepathic dog named Cosmo the Spacedog is Knowhere's chief of security and works closely with the new team. After a confrontation with the Universal Church of Truth, the team meets a semi-amnesiac man who identifies himself as Vance Astro – Major Victory of the original Guardians of the Galaxy. Astro's declaration inspires the as-yet-unnamed team to adopt the "Guardians of the Galaxy" name for their own. When the team learns Star-Lord directed Mantis to telepathically coerce the heroes into joining the team, they disband.

Rocket Raccoon decides to continue Star-Lord's mission and starts a search for the missing members. His new team includes Bug, Mantis, Major Victory, and Groot, who is fully regrown. Meanwhile, Star-Lord was banished to the Negative Zone by Ronan the Accuser for his actions during the Phalanx's attempted conquest of the Kree Empire. There, he finds himself in the middle of King Blastaar's fight to break into Prison 42 and use its portal to invade Earth. Star-Lord allies with Jack Flag to defend the prison and contact the other Guardians for rescue. Rocket's new team successfully brings both of them back, and Flag becomes a Guardian. Elsewhere, Drax and Phyla begin looking for Cammi, but on their search they talk to a seer who tells them about an oncoming war. Phyla is able to wake Moondragon from the dead, but loses her Quantum Bands in the process. The consequence for Phyla is that she is now the new avatar of death. They go back to Knowhere and do not follow up on the search for Cammi.

=== War of Kings ===
Warlock and Gamora return and inform the team of the War of Kings. They split into three teams, one each to the Kree and Shi'ar, and one staying on Knowhere to coordinate. The Kree team is heard by Black Bolt and the Inhumans, but their request for peace is denied. The Shi'ar team is attacked by Vulcan and the Imperial Guard, leading them to ally with the Starjammers.

Star-Lord, Mantis, Bug, Jack Flag, and Cosmo are taken to the 31st century by that era's Guardians, who warn them of the creation of an all-destroying energy rift called the Fault at the war's conclusion. Trapped in the future, Star-Lord's team is able to get a message to Warlock in the 21st century. Warlock is unable to stop the Fault's creation, but is able to contain it with a spell that requires a stable, unused timeline. Warlock chooses the one he previously erased, causing him to become the Magus. Star-Lord's team, with the help of Kang the Conqueror, are returned to this point in the timestream. To escape, Magus fakes the death of himself, Mantis, Cosmo, Major Victory, Martyr, and Gamora.

Martyr frees herself with the help of Maelstrom, and enables Mantis to call the other Guardians for help telepathically. When they come to the rescue, Phyla-Vell is misled by Maelstrom into freeing Thanos. Thanos kills Martyr, but is captured by the Guardians and taken back to Knowhere as a prisoner.

=== The Thanos Imperative ===
In the 2010 miniseries The Thanos Imperative, the universe is invaded by the Cancerverse, a universe that lies on the opposite side of the Fault, a rift in space-time formed at the end of "War of Kings". The Guardians take Thanos to the Cancerverse in an attempt to end the war early. Along the way, Drax attacks Thanos and is killed. They are ultimately successful at ending the war, but Thanos is left enraged and promising to kill everyone. Along with Nova, Star-Lord remains in the collapsing Cancerverse as the other Guardians escape.

After the death of Star-Lord, the Guardians disband. Still believing in their cause, Cosmo recruits another team under the name "Annihilators". Rocket Raccoon and Groot later reunite and decide to continue the Guardians' legacy after the duo prevent an incident on Rocket's home world, Halfworld.

The new team appears on Earth to aid the Avengers against Thanos.

=== Marvel NOW! ===
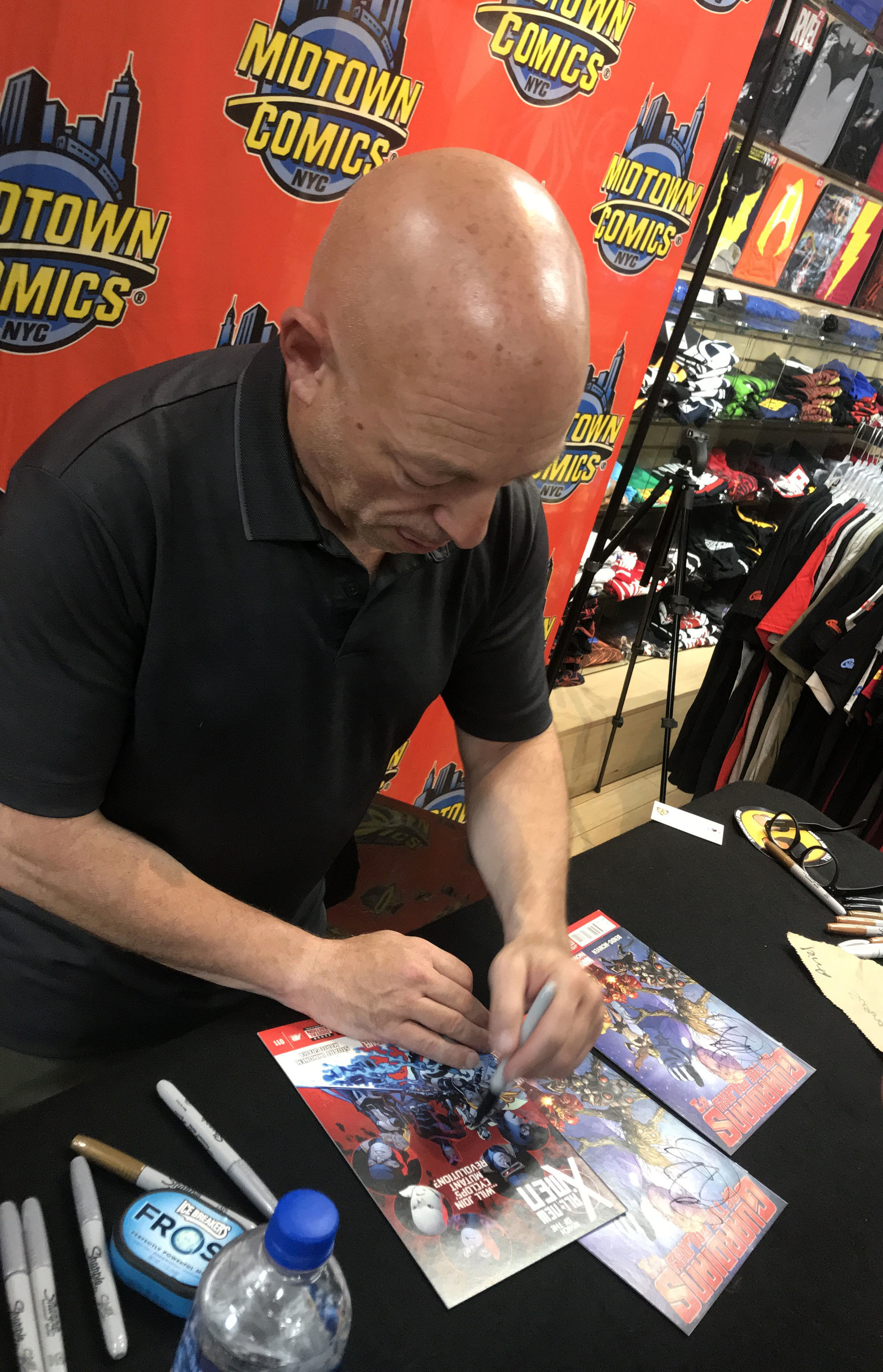
Writer Brian Michael Bendis signing books at Midtown Comics in Manhattan, including copies of the Marvel NOW! version of the series

The Marvel NOW! iteration of the team includes Star-Lord, Drax the Destroyer, Gamora, Groot, Rocket Raccoon, and Iron Man. After Star-Lord's father visits him in a bar to tell him that it is forbidden for any alien species to visit Earth, Iron Man is attacked by an army of Badoon invading Earth. The Guardians and their newest member Iron Man defeat the ship; however, London is still invaded. The Guardians defend London and finish off the horde of Badoon but learn that, for violating the "Earth-is-off-limits" rule (the Spartax Earth Directive), they are to be placed under arrest by J'son, the king of Spartax. The Guardians escape with the help of Groot, who had recently regrown after being destroyed by a Badoon ship's explosion. In April 2013, it was announced that Image Comics character Angela would be incorporated into the Marvel Comics universe following a legal battle between Angela's creators Neil Gaiman and Todd McFarlane, which ended with Gaiman giving Marvel Comics the rights to the character. After appearing in "Age of Ultron", she joins the Guardians. Captain Marvel and Agent Venom later have stints as team members as well.

During the "Secret Wars" storyline, the Guardians of the Galaxy take part in the incursion between Earth-616 and Earth-1610. During the incursion, Rocket Raccoon and Groot are killed by the Children of Tomorrow, Star-Lord is teleported away trying to come up with a back-up plan, and Gamora and Drax the Destroyer are surrounded and confused by the corpses of their comrades. During the subsequent conflict with the Beyonder-empowered Doom, Star-Lord is one of the survivors of the previous universe, piloting the 616 and Ultimate versions of Mister Fantastic in to mount a final assault on Doom's castle, and revealing that he kept a twig from Groot in his pocket until the right moment.

=== All New All-Different Marvel ===
During the "Secret Empire" storyline, the Guardians of the Galaxy assist Captain Marvel, the Ultimates, the Alpha Flight Space Program, Hyperion, and Quasar in fighting the Chitauri wave. Captain America, who was brainwashed into being a Hydra sleeper agent, activates the Planetary Defense Shield, trapping them outside of Earth.

In 2020, Marvel announced a reboot of the series, written by Al Ewing and drawn by Juann Cabal. This new series depicts the titular team, led by Star-Lord and Rocket Raccoon and including Marvel Boy, Nova, Phyla-Vell, Moondragon and Hercules, fighting against the Gods of Olympus, with Gamora, Groot, and Drax also appear as prominent supporting characters. Wiccan and Hulkling later join as members.

== Reception ==
=== Volumes ===
==== Guardians of the Galaxy - 2008 ====
The 2008 series holds a 7.5 out of 10 critic rating on the review aggregator website Comic Book Round Up.

The May 2008 sales estimate for the first issue was 39,854 copies, making it the 61st top-selling comic title that month. The first and second issues sold out, and were later published as part of a collected edition.

Al Ewing's run of Guardians of the Galaxy received a nomination for the GLAAD Media Award for Outstanding Comic Book at the 32nd GLAAD Media Awards in 2021.

== Other versions ==
During the "Secret Wars" storyline in the domain of King James' England (which is based on the Marvel 1602 reality), the Guardians of the Galaxy have a counterpart here named the Gardiner's Men. They are a troupe of performers consisting of Madam Gomorrah, Peadar O'Cuill, Arthur Dubhghlas, Goodman Root, and Aroughcun the Raccoon. Angela later befriended them when she helped to fight off attacking beasts.

In another story, "Baby Thanos", other team members appeared with Cable instead of Star-Lord from the resurrected and remade universe where they became "Punisher Universe". Guardians members Peni Parker, Wolverine, Kamala Khan (Captain Marvel), Juggernaut (Juggerduck), Cloak and Dagger, Iron Groot, and others were killed by Frank Castle in order to protect the infant Thanos.

== In other media ==
=== Television ===
- The Guardians of the Galaxy appear in The Avengers: Earth's Mightiest Heroes episode "Michael Korvac", consisting of Star-Lord, Rocket Raccoon, Groot, Quasar, and Adam Warlock.
- The Guardians of the Galaxy appear in a self-titled episode of Ultimate Spider-Man, consisting of Star-Lord, Rocket Raccoon, Gamora, Groot, and Drax the Destroyer. This version of the group care for and train Nova.
- The Guardians of the Galaxy appear in Avengers Assemble.
- The Guardians of the Galaxy appear in Hulk and the Agents of S.M.A.S.H.
- The Guardians of the Galaxy appear in a self-titled episode of Marvel Disk Wars: The Avengers.
- The Guardians of the Galaxy, based on the MCU incarnation, appear in a self-titled animated series.
- The Guardians of the Galaxy appear in Spider-Man.
- The Guardians of the Galaxy appear in Lego Marvel Super Heroes – Guardians of the Galaxy: The Thanos Threat.

=== Marvel Cinematic Universe ===
The Guardians of the Galaxy appear in media set in the Marvel Cinematic Universe, initially consisting of Star-Lord, Gamora, Drax, Rocket, Groot, with the additions of Mantis and Nebula. After the original group eventually disbands, a new iteration is formed, consisting of Rocket, Groot, Cosmo, Kraglin, Adam Warlock, Phyla, and Blurp. Following their first appearance in their self-titled film, the Guardians make subsequent appearances in the films Guardians of the Galaxy Vol. 2, Avengers: Infinity War, Avengers: Endgame, Thor: Love and Thunder, and Guardians of the Galaxy Vol. 3 as well as The Guardians of the Galaxy Holiday Special.

=== Video games ===
- The Guardians of the Galaxy appear in Marvel Heroes.
- The Guardians of the Galaxy appear in Lego Marvel Super Heroes.
- The Guardians of the Galaxy appear in Marvel: Avengers Alliance.
- The Guardians of the Galaxy appear as playable characters in Disney Infinity 2.0.
- The Guardians of the Galaxy appear as playable characters in Marvel: Contest of Champions.
- The Guardians of the Galaxy appear in Guardians of the Galaxy: The Telltale Series.
- The Guardians of the Galaxy appear in Lego Marvel Super Heroes 2.
- The Guardians of the Galaxy appear in Marvel Ultimate Alliance 3: The Black Order.
- The Guardians of the Galaxy appear in a self-titled video game.
- The Guardians of the Galaxy appear as playable characters in Marvel Rivals, consisting of Star-Lord, Rocket Raccoon, Groot, Mantis, and Adam Warlock.
- A group based on the Guardians of the Galaxy called the Amazing Guardians appear in Marvel Tokon: Fighting Souls, led by Spider-Man and consisting of Star-Lord, Ms. Marvel, Peni Parker and SP//dr. In their story mode ending, the actual Guardians (based on the MCU lineup) appear alongside Star-Lord when he exchanges the Champion's belt.

=== Merchandise ===
- A Guardians of the Galaxy three pack featuring a Rocket Raccoon, Star-Lord, Drax, and a miniature Groot was released in the Marvel Universe toyline. The figures were later re-released individually as part of the Avengers Infinite toyline.
- The MCU incarnation of the Guardians of the Galaxy, based on their appearances in their self-titled film, received figures in the Marvel Minimates toyline in late 2014.
- The MCU incarnation of the Guardians of the Galaxy, based on their appearances in their self-titled film, received figures from Hot Toys throughout 2015.

=== Miscellaneous ===
- The Guardians of the Galaxy appear in the Marvel Universe Live! stage show.
- The MCU incarnation of the Guardians of the Galaxy appear in the Guardians of the Galaxy – Mission: Breakout! attraction at Disney California Adventure Park.
- The Guardians of the Galaxy, based on the MCU incarnation, appear in the Guardians of the Galaxy: Cosmic Rewind attraction at Epcot.

== Collected editions ==
=== Volume 2 (Abnett and Lanning) ===
Title	Material collected	Publication date	ISBN
Legacy	Guardians of the Galaxy (vol. 2) #1–6	January 2009	0-7851-3338-0
War of Kings: Book 1	Guardians of the Galaxy (vol. 2) #7–12	June 2009	0-7851-3339-9
War of Kings: Book 2	Guardians of the Galaxy (vol. 2) #13–19, Marvel Spotlight: War of Kings	November 2009	978-0785140481
Realm of Kings	Guardians of the Galaxy (vol. 2) #20–25	July 2010	0-7851-4049-2
Guardians of the Galaxy by Abnett & Lanning: The Complete Collection Volume 1	Guardians of the Galaxy (vol. 2) #1–12	August 2014	978-0785190646
Guardians of the Galaxy by Abnett & Lanning: The Complete Collection Volume 2	Guardians of the Galaxy (vol. 2) #13–25	December 2014	978-0785190639
Guardians of the Galaxy by Abnett & Lanning Omnibus	Guardians of the Galaxy (vol. 2) #1–25, The Thanos Imperative: Ignition, The Thanos Imperative #1–6, The Thanos Imperative: Devastation, material from Annihilators #1–4, Annihilators: Earthfall #1–4	May 2016	978-0785198345
Guardians Of The Galaxy Modern Era Epic Collection Vol 1 Somebody's Got To Do It	Annihilation: Conquest - Star-Lord #1-4, Guardians of the Galaxy (vol. 2) #1-12	September 2023	978-1302953751
Guardians Of The Galaxy Modern Era Epic Collection Vol 2 War of Kings	Guardians of the Galaxy (vol. 2) #13-25, The Thanos Imperative: Ignition, The Thanos Imperative #1–6	January 2025	978-1302959968

=== Volume 3 (Brian Michael Bendis) ===
Title	Material collected	Publication date	ISBN
Guardians of the Galaxy Vol. 1: Cosmic Avengers	Guardians of the Galaxy (vol. 3) #0.1,1–3, Guardians of the Galaxy: Tomorrow's Avengers #1	September 2013	978-0785166078
Guardians of the Galaxy Vol. 2: Angela	Guardians of the Galaxy (vol. 3) #4–10	February 2014	978-0785166085
Guardians of the Galaxy/All-New X-Men: The Trial of Jean Grey	Guardians of the Galaxy (vol. 3) #11–13, All-New X-Men (vol. 1) #22–24	June 2014	978-0785166092
Guardians of the Galaxy Vol. 3: Guardians Disassembled	Guardians of the Galaxy (vol. 3) #14–17, Captain Marvel (vol. 7) #1, material from Amazing Spider-Man #654, Free Comic Book Day 2014: Guardians of the Galaxy	November 2014	978-0785154792
Guardians of the Galaxy Vol. 4: Original Sin	Guardians of the Galaxy (vol. 3) #18–23	December 2014	978-0785192459
Guardians of the Galaxy Vol. 5: Through the Looking Glass	Guardians of the Galaxy (vol. 3) #24–27, Annual #1	April 2015	978-0785197386
Guardians of the Galaxy & X-Men: The Black Vortex	Guardians of the Galaxy & X-Men: The Black Vortex Alpha #1, Guardians of the Galaxy (vol. 3) #24–25, Legendary Star-Lord #9–11, All-New X-Men (vol. 1) #38–39, Guardians Team-Up #2, Nova (vol. 5) #28; Cyclops (vol. 3) #12; Captain Marvel (vol. 8) #14; Guardians of the Galaxy & X-Men: The Black Vortex Omega #1	July 2015	978-0785197706
Guardians of the Galaxy Volume 1 (HC)	Guardians of the Galaxy (vol. 3) #0.1, 1–10, Guardians of the Galaxy: Tomorrow 's Avengers #1	May 2015	978-0785194002
Guardians of the Galaxy Volume 2 (HC)	Guardians of the Galaxy (vol. 3) #11–17, All-New X-Men (vol. 1) #22–24, Free Comic Book Day 2014: Guardians of the Galaxy	January 2016	978-0785198246
Guardians of the Galaxy Volume 3 (HC)	Guardians of the Galaxy (vol. 3) #18–27, Annual #1	September 2016	978-1302900083
Guardians of the Galaxy by Brian Michael Bendis Omnibus	Avengers Assemble #1–8, Guardians of the Galaxy (vol. 3) #0.1, 1–27, Annual #1; Guardians of the Galaxy: Tomorrow's Avengers #1, All-New X-Men (vol. 1) #22–24, Free Comic Book Day 2014: Guardians of the Galaxy, Guardians of Knowhere #1–4	December 2016	978-1302900274

=== Guardians Team-Up ===
Title	Material collected	Publication date	ISBN
Guardians Team-Up Vol. 1: Guardians Assemble	Guardians Team-Up #1–5, Tails of Pet-Avengers #1	November 2015	978-0785197140
Guardians Team-Up Vol. 2: Unlikely Story	Guardians Team-Up #6–10, Deadpool Team-Up #883	February 2016	978-0785199113

=== Secret Wars Miniseries ===
Title	Material collected	Publication date	ISBN
Guardians of Knowhere	Guardians of Knowhere #1–4, New Avengers: Illuminati #3	December 2015	978-0785198444
Star-Lord & Kitty Pryde	Star-Lord & Kitty Pryde #1–3, Generation Next #1, Guardians of the Galaxy & X-Men: The Black Vortex Omega	December 2015	978-0785198437

=== Volume 4 (Brian Michael Bendis) ===
Title	Material collected	Publication date	ISBN
Guardians of the Galaxy: New Guard Vol. 1: Emperor Quill	Guardians of the Galaxy (vol. 4) #1–5	May 2016	978-0785195184
Guardians of the Galaxy: New Guard Vol. 2: Wanted	Guardians of the Galaxy (vol. 4) #6–10	November 2016	978-0785195191
Guardians of the Galaxy: New Guard Vol. 3: Civil War II	Guardians of the Galaxy (vol. 4) #11–14	February 2017	978-1302903015
Guardians of the Galaxy: New Guard Vol. 4: Grounded	Guardians of the Galaxy (vol. 4) #15–19	October 2017	978-1302906702
Guardians Of The Galaxy Volume 4 (HC)	Guardians of the Galaxy (vol. 4) #1–10	November 2017	978-1302904371
Guardians of the Galaxy Volume 5 (HC)	Guardians of the Galaxy (vol. 4) #11–19, material from Free Comic Book Day 2016 Civil War II	August 2018	978-1302908966

=== Guardians of Infinity ===
Title	Material collected	Publication date	ISBN
Guardians of the Galaxy: Guardians of Infinity	Guardians of Infinity #1–8 (A stories)	August 2016	978-0785195870
Guardians of the Galaxy: Tales of the Cosmos	Guardians of Infinity #1–8 (B stories)	August 2016	978-0785195887

=== All New Guardians of the Galaxy (Gerry Duggan) ===
Title	Material collected	Publication date	ISBN
All New Guardians of the Galaxy Vol. 1: Communication Breakdown	All-New Guardians of the Galaxy #1–2, 4, 6, 8, 10, Free Comic Book Day 2017 Guardians of the Galaxy	December 2017	978-1302905446
All New Guardians of the Galaxy Vol. 2: Riders in the Sky	All-New Guardians of the Galaxy #3, 5, 7, 9, 11–12	February 2018	978-1302905453
All New Guardians of the Galaxy Vol. 3: Infinity Quest	Guardians of the Galaxy (vol. 1) #146–150	March 2018	978-1302905460
Guardians of the Galaxy by Gerry Duggan Omnibus	All-New Guardians Of The Galaxy #1–12, Guardians Of The Galaxy (vol. 1) #146–150, material from Free Comic Book Day 2017 Guardians Of The Galaxy	October 2018	978-1302913151

=== Volume 5 (Donny Cates) ===
Title	Material collected	Publication date	ISBN
Guardians of the Galaxy Vol. 1: The Final Gauntlet	Guardians of the Galaxy (vol. 5) #1–6	August 2019	978-1302915889
Guardians of the Galaxy Vol. 2: Faithless	Guardians of the Galaxy (vol. 5) #7–12, Annual #1	March 2020	978-1302915896
Guardians of the Galaxy by Donny Cates	Guardians of the Galaxy (vol. 5) #1–12, Annual #1	February 2021	978-1302926731

=== Volume 6 (Al Ewing) ===
Title	Material collected	Publication date	ISBN
Guardians of the Galaxy Vol. 1: Then It's Us	Guardians of the Galaxy (vol. 6) #1–5	October 2020	978-1302920753
Guardians of the Galaxy Vol. 2: Here We Make Our Stand	Guardians of the Galaxy (vol. 6) #6–12	May 2021	978-1302920760
Guardians of the Galaxy Vol. 3: We're Super Heroes	Guardians of the Galaxy (vol. 6) #13–18	November 2021	978-1302928766
Last Annihilation	Guardians of the Galaxy (vol. 6) #16–18, Cable Reloaded #1, The Last Annihilation: Wiccan & Hulking #1, The Last Annihilation: Wakanda #1, S.W.O.R.D. (vol. 2) #7	August 2022	978-1302933111
Guardians of the Galaxy by Al Ewing	Guardians of the Galaxy (vol. 6) #1-18, Rocket #1-6 and material from Guardians of the Galaxy Annual #1	April 2023	978-1302949907

=== Volume 7 (Colin Kelly and Jackson Lanzing) ===
Title	Material collected	Publication date	ISBN
Guardians of the Galaxy Vol. 1: Grootfall	Guardians of the Galaxy (vol. 7) #1–5	November 2023	978-1302951191
Guardians of the Galaxy Vol. 2: Grootrise	Guardians of the Galaxy (vol. 7) #6–10, Guardians of the Galaxy Annual #1	April 2024	978-1302951207

=== Other Miniseries ===
Title	Material collected	Publication Date	ISBN
Guardians of the Galaxy: Mother Entropy	Guardians Of The Galaxy: Mother Entropy #1–5	August 2017	978-1846538322
Guardians of the Galaxy: Telltale Games	Guardians of the Galaxy: Telltale Games #1–5	June 2018	978-1302909390
