= Annihilation: Conquest =

Limited series

- Cover art for Annihilation: Conquest #6; Art by Aleksi Briclot
- Publisher: Marvel Comics
- Publication date: August 2007 – June 2008
- Genre: Science fiction, superhero; Crossover
Title(s)
- Annihilation: Conquest #1-6
- Annihilation: Conquest Prologue #1
- Annihilation: Conquest - Quasar #1-4
- Annihilation: Conquest - Star-Lord #1-4
- Annihilation: Conquest - Wraith #1-4
- Nova #4-7, 11-12, Annual 1
- Marvel Encyclopedia #1
- Main character(s): Guardians of the Galaxy; Adam Warlock; Super-Skrull; Captain Universe; Mantis; High Evolutionary; Ronan; Blaastar; Phalanx; Ultron
- Volume One: ISBN 0-7851-2782-8
- Volume Two: ISBN 0-7851-2716-X

"Annihilation: Conquest" is a 2007–08 Marvel Comics crossover storyline and the sequel to 2006's "Annihilation". The series again focuses on Marvel's cosmic heroes defending the universe against the Phalanx, now led by Ultron. Nova returns once more in a title role, along with Quasar, Star-Lord, and a new character called Wraith.

Other characters featured were Ronan the Accuser, Moondragon, Super-Skrull, Gamora, Mantis and Rocket Raccoon. The series also saw the return of Adam Warlock to the Marvel Universe.

== Publication history ==
The format mirrored that of its predecessor with one minor difference; instead of four four-issue mini-series preceding the six-issue main series, there were three. In place of the fourth, there were four issues of the ongoing series Nova.

Dan Abnett and Andy Lanning were given the task of overseeing the story; "We were approached by Andy Schmidt, who edited the first "Annihilation" storyline, and asked to pilot the next event, which Bill Rosemann is editing." They ended up writing the Prologue, the Nova series crossover and the main Annihilation: Conquest limited series.

The remaining mini-series by Christos Gage were focused on Quasar, Star-Lord by Keith Giffen and Wraith, by Javier Grillo-Marxuach.

== Summary ==
The techno-organic Phalanx invade the Kree empire, using the Space Knights as pawns unwittingly brought to the Kree homeworld of Hala by the former Star-Lord, Peter Quill. Assimilating the majority of the population and encasing the Kree galaxy in a force field, the Phalanx conquer the Kree in a matter of weeks.

Soon afterward, Wraith is captured by the Phalanx, but manages to easily defeat them by inflicting them with fear. Wraith states that he has no interest in fighting the Phalanx, but they proceed to attack him anyway. After being defeated, the Phalanx dispatch Ronan the Accuser, who has been converted to their cause, to torture Wraith. Wraith escapes along with the Super-Skrull, and is guided by the spirit of his deceased father to find the man who murdered his family.

Under interrogation by Ronan, Wraith reveals his origin as the son of an exiled Kree scientist. As a young boy, Wraith was kidnapped by the extra-dimensional Nameless Ones after his parents were murdered and was subsequently bonded with the symbiotic creature Exolon. Wraith eventually murdered his captors and returned to Kree space, seeking his family's killer.

At the onset of the Phalanx invasion, Peter Quill is at ground zero. He manages to find cover and make it to a Kree prison in which he meets several warriors to team with including, Mantis and Captain Universe. He resumes his former persona, Star-Lord, and takes off to fight against the Phalanx.

Meanwhile, Quasar (Phyla-Vell) has been on the outskirts of Kree space, aiding those still suffering from the devastation of the Annihilation Wave when she learns of the Phalanx invasion. Accompanied by Moondragon, she follows the commands of a mysterious voice which instructs her to find the "savior" of the Kree empire. During her quest, she battles the Super-Adaptoid, learns how to control her new quantum bands, and discovers more about Moondragon's history before watching her transform into a dragon.

Quasar and Moondragon track the savior to the planet Morag IV, but are ambushed by Super-Adaptoid. The heroes recover thanks to the locals, but discover the Adaptoid has already reached the savior and is attempting to assimilate them. After a brief fight, the Adaptoid unleashes a destructive force on the nearby town, forcing Quasar to choose civilians over the savior at the cost of exhausting her Quantum Bands.

Quasar finds herself, Moondragon, and the natives of Morag IV in pitched battle against not only the Super-Adaptoid, but a host of Phalanx bent on assimilating Adam Warlock. Quasar and Moondragon ultimately defeat the Super-Adaptoid and, in the process, Quasar reabsorbs power into her quantum bands from the Super-Adaptoid that he had earlier absorbed. The mysterious voice guiding Quasar turns out to belong to the Supreme Intelligence, who believed that Adam would prove to be the Kree savior. Adam was regenerating in a cocoon, but his regeneration was damaged by the Super-Adaptoid and the Phalanx. Moondragon and the Supreme Intelligence help Adam re-emerge, but he is younger than expected (due to the prematurity of his re-emergence) and troubled.

Moondragon and Quasar seek to persuade the High Evolutionary to join them in their struggle against the Phalanx. Ultron finds them and apparently kills Moondragon. Ultron and Adam prepare to battle. Blastaar, who was working against the Phalanx, appears to die. Star-Lord appears to have the plans for the Phalanx Babel Spire and plans to infiltrate it.

The High Evolutionary is captured by the Phalanx and is forced to transfer Ultron's essence into Adam's body. Star-Lord is captured and tortured by Ultron, but escapes along with Bug, Rocket Raccoon and Mantis. Their escape plan involves Groot growing inside the Babel Tower and destroying it from the inside out, sacrificing himself in the process. Rocket takes a cutting of Groot to regrow him.

Outside the energy shield, a gathering of ships from the Badoon, Rigellians, Galadorian Spaceknights, Spartoi and remaining Kree constantly batter the shield with all their weaponry, failing to get through. Suddenly, Nova appears with Drax and Gamora (both free of the Phalanx) along with two members of the Technarchy, including Warlock. Warlock infects Ultron with a techno-organic virus, which causes Ultron to flee.

As he departs, the High Evolutionary reveals that Adam is still alive and will continue to lead the group. It turns out that he was stored in the gems on the Quantum Bands Phyla-Vell wore. She returns his soul to his body. Ultron takes control of the Kree altered Sentries and forms one giant Ultron form. Adam and Phyla-Vell stand against him, and Adam transfers all the souls of the Kree lost in the Conquest to the Quantum Bands, energizing them and reforging Phyla-Vell's sword. She deals the death blow to Ultron, after Wraith had used his Exolons to trap Ultron in his current body.

== Sequels and spin-offs ==
The main characters in this story would go on to form the core of the new Guardians of the Galaxy, also written by Abnett and Lanning.

== Collected editions ==
Title	Material collected	Published date	ISBN
Annihilation: Conquest - Book 1	Annihilation: Conquest Prologue, Annihilation: Conquest - Quasar #1-4, Annihilation: Conquest - Starlord #1-4, Annihilation Saga	Jan 23, 2008	978-0785127826
Annihilation: Conquest - Book 2	Annihilation: Conquest - Wraith #1-4, Nova #4-7, Annihilation: Conquest #1-6	Jul 23, 2008	978-0785127161
Nova Volume 1: Annihilation - Conquest	Nova (vol. 4) #1-7	Dec 26, 2007	978-0785126317
Nova Volume 2: Knowhere	Nova (vol. 4) #8-12 and Annual #1	Jul, 23, 2008	978-0785126324
Annihilation Modern Era Epic Collection: Conquest Prelude	Annihilation: Conquest Prologue, Annihilation: Conquest - Quasar #1-4, Annihilation: Conquest - Starlord #1-4, Annihilation Saga	Jun 9, 2026	978-1302967116
Annihilation: Conquest Omnibus	Nova (vol. 4) #1–12, Annual #1; Annihilation: Conquest Prologue #1; Annihilation: Conquest – Star-Lord #1–4; Annihilation: Conquest – Quasar #1–4; Annihilation: Conquest – Wraith #1–4; Annihilation: Conquest #1–6; Annihilation Saga	Jun 17, 2015	Aleksi Briclot cover: 978-0785192701
Annihilation: Conquest Omnibus	Nova (vol. 4) #1–12, Annual #1; Annihilation: Conquest Prologue #1; Annihilation: Conquest – Star-Lord #1–4; Annihilation: Conquest – Quasar #1–4; Annihilation: Conquest – Wraith #1–4; Annihilation: Conquest #1–6; Annihilation Saga	May 12, 2021	Aleksi Briclot cover: 978-1302929091
Annihilation: Conquest Omnibus	Nova (vol. 4) #1–12, Annual #1; Annihilation: Conquest Prologue #1; Annihilation: Conquest – Star-Lord #1–4; Annihilation: Conquest – Quasar #1–4; Annihilation: Conquest – Wraith #1–4; Annihilation: Conquest #1–6; Annihilation Saga	May 12, 2021	Clint Langley DM cover: 978-1302929107
Annihilation: Conquest Omnibus	Nova (vol. 4) #1–12, Annual #1; Annihilation: Conquest Prologue #1; Annihilation: Conquest – Star-Lord #1–4; Annihilation: Conquest – Quasar #1–4; Annihilation: Conquest – Wraith #1–4; Annihilation: Conquest #1–6; Annihilation Saga	Aug 19, 2025	Aleksi Briclot cover: 978-1302966324
Annihilation: Conquest Omnibus	Nova (vol. 4) #1–12, Annual #1; Annihilation: Conquest Prologue #1; Annihilation: Conquest – Star-Lord #1–4; Annihilation: Conquest – Quasar #1–4; Annihilation: Conquest – Wraith #1–4; Annihilation: Conquest #1–6; Annihilation Saga	Aug 19, 2025	Clint Langley DM cover: 978-1302966331

=== In other media ===
- The 2014 Guardians of the Galaxy film took some inspiration from this event, as well as the ongoing Guardians of the Galaxy series that spun out of it.
- In July 2023 Titan Books released a novelization of the event titled "Guardians of the Galaxy - Annihilation: Conquest" by Brendan Deneen.
