= Marvel Ultimate Alliance 3: The Black Order =

2019 action role-playing video game

- Cover art of Marvel Ultimate Alliance 3: The Black Order (Note: Cover features: Wolverine, Spider-Man, Iron Man, Captain Marvel, Hulk, Falcon, Groot, Rocket Raccoon, Venom, Captain America, Doctor Strange, Daredevil, Storm, Black Panther, Miles Morales, Scarlet Witch, Black Widow, Deadpool, Star-Lord, Nightcrawler, Thor and Spider-Gwen.)
- Developer: Team Ninja
- Publisher: Nintendo
- Director: Hiroya Usuda
- Producers: Yosuke Hayashi; Peter Rosas
- Artist: Tim Tsang
- Writers: Marc Sumerak; Makoto Shibata; Kohei Ota
- Composers: Takahiro Umeda; Masafumi Okubo
- Series: Marvel Ultimate Alliance
- Platform: Nintendo Switch
- Release: July 19, 2019
- Genre: Action role-playing
- Modes: Single-player, multiplayer

Marvel Ultimate Alliance 3: The Black Order is a 2019 action role-playing game developed by Team Ninja and published by Nintendo for the Nintendo Switch. It is the third installment in the Marvel: Ultimate Alliance series, following 2006's Marvel: Ultimate Alliance and 2009's Marvel: Ultimate Alliance 2, and the first Ultimate Alliance game produced without the involvement of previous publisher Activision, whose license to publish Marvel Games expired in 2014. The game follows a new team of superheroes as they come together to save the universe from Thanos and the eponymous Black Order, who have launched a campaign to find the six Infinity Gems.

Upon release, Ultimate Alliance 3 received mixed reviews from critics, who generally found the gameplay and storyline fun but were disappointed that the game did not improve much upon its predecessors. The game had sold over 1.6 million copies by December 2022.

== Gameplay ==
In this screenshot, the Guardians of the Galaxy (Star-Lord, Gamora - highlighted to indicate she is currently being controlled by the player -, Rocket Raccoon and Drax), assisted by an NPC Spider-Man, are fighting against Sandman in a boss battle.

Like the previous two entries, gameplay is reminiscent of a top-down dungeon crawler with an emphasis on cooperative play. Up to four players can play the game cooperatively locally either on the same screen with a single docked Nintendo Switch system or undocked with up to four systems, or online with friends or random player lobbies. Players choose four characters from various Marvel teams to traverse linear stages, fight enemies, and defeat bosses. Certain passive buffs are acquired with particular character combinations. Each character's controls are fundamentally identical; each has a jump, light attack, heavy attack, dodge, block, and four special abilities. Special abilities can be synced with the other three members for a synergy boost, with an especially powerful attack unleashed if all four party members sync up simultaneously. Additional characters are unlocked by story progression or optional Infinity Rift challenges.

Character progression is handled in a similar manner to traditional role-playing games, with party members leveling up by defeating enemies and bosses. In addition to stat increases, passive buffs can be attached to characters (excluding an alternate playable version of Thanos) by equipping ISO-8 crystals. A sprawling skill tree is also present, which allows characters to gain permanent stat increases by acquiring and spending in-game currency.

== Synopsis ==
The plot of Marvel Ultimate Alliance 3: The Black Order is an original story written specifically for the game and disregards the stories and continuity of the first two games in the series.

While it takes inspiration from recently released Marvel projects such as Avengers: Infinity War and Avengers: Endgame, both of which were inspired by the 1991 storyline The Infinity Gauntlet, the game's story was written to reflect its wider cast of characters and to stand apart from the Marvel Cinematic Universe, the comics, and other popularized versions. Additionally, the game takes inspiration from various Marvel Comics storylines such as the 2008 Guardians of the Galaxy series, Spider-Verse, New Avengers, the 2017 Defenders series, Shadowland, Midnight Sons, Avengers: Ultron Unlimited, X-Men, Avengers/Defenders War, Inhumans, Ta-Nehisi Coates's Black Panther, Uncanny Avengers, The Infinity Gauntlet, Illuminati, Avengers Assemble, Infinity, Doctor Strange: Damnation, X-Men: The Dark Phoenix Saga, and Jack Kirby's Fantastic Four.

=== Plot ===
The Mad Titan Thanos and his Black Order—Corvus Glaive, Proxima Midnight, Ebony Maw, Cull Obsidian, and Supergiant—attempt to collect the six Infinity Stones to achieve galactic conquest. Originally guarded by Nebula and Ronan the Accuser, the Guardians of the Galaxy stumble upon their attempt to hide them from the group and end up accidentally alerting the Order to their presence. In desperation, Star-Lord uses the Space Stone to scatter the other stones on Earth, and to get him and his team to safety. As S.H.I.E.L.D. detects their presence, Nick Fury Jr. unites the Guardians and Earth's mightiest heroes to find them.

Together they are able to retrieve the Time Stone from the Sinister Six led by Green Goblin during a breakout at the Raft.

Then they retrieve the Mind Stone from Ultron when he assaults the Avengers Tower. The Power Stone is retrieved from the Hellfire Club and then again from the Brotherhood of Mutants members Magneto, Mystique, and Juggernaut, who briefly steal it during a Sentinel attack orchestrated by Ultron at the Xavier Institute for Gifted Youngsters.

The Reality Stone is recovered from Dormammu in the Dark Dimension after the heroes escape from the attacking Black Order members. Then they claim the Soul Stone from A.I.M., led by MODOK, when Winter Soldier briefly secured the stone upon arriving at Wakanda for reinforcements.

Along the way, they help the Defenders retrieve an ISO-8 crystal from the Kingpin and face the Hand at Shadowland; stop an attempted coup d'état by Maximus at the Inhuman city of Attilan; and form uneasy alliances with Venom, the Brotherhood, Loki, and Thanos' illegitimate son Thane.

When the Black Order find them in Wakanda, Thane gives himself and the Infinity Stones over to them to ensure the heroes' safety, but Proxima Midnight nonetheless teleports them to Asgard, where they face Hela and Surtur, as well as Hydra, led by the Red Skull, defeating them with the aid of Valkyrie, Odin, and Loki. Odin then transports the heroes to Knowhere, where the Black Order and the Nova Corps are waging war.

The heroes battle the Black Order and retrieve most of the Stones, but as they prepare to clash one final time, they are stopped by Thane using the Time Stone. While Thane is distracted trying to choose a side, Thanos attacks him from behind and places the Infinity Stones in his Infinity Gauntlet, transporting everyone to his throne for a final battle. Thane, corrupted by the power of the Stones, takes the Gauntlet from Thanos and uses the Stones' power to don the Infinity Armor, planning to kill his father to prove his superiority and the heroes if they stand in his way.

The group is transported into the Heart of Infinity at the center of the universe, where the Infinity Stones were forged, and aid Thanos in stopping Thane. Thanos reveals that the power of the Infinity Armor is too great for any mortal being, even Thanos himself, and pulls the gauntlet from Thane's hand, causing both to disappear and leaving the heroes and the Infinity Stones behind. Ebony Maw attempts to take the Infinity Stones for himself, but is arrested by Richard Rider and the Nova Corps, as Rider plans to have him and the rest of the Black Order imprisoned at the Kyln. The heroes affirm they will be ready should Thanos ever return and agree to separate the Infinity Stones, hiding them in distant corners of the universe for safekeeping.

In a post-credits scene, a pair of eyes are seen above the Heart of Infinity.

==== Black Order Expansion Pass ====
Sometime after Thanos and Thane's disappearances, Doctor Doom attacks Wakanda, seeking the Soul Stone in Black Panther's possession. All the heroes reunite to stop him, but Doom transports them to the Negative Zone so he can continue with his plans unhindered. The heroes are overwhelmed by the Negative Zone's native Insectoids, but are rescued by the Fantastic Four, who had been trapped at Negative Zone while pursuing Doom before Thanos's attack. The four join the heroes to find Annihilus, the ruler of the Negative Zone, and defeat him, obtaining his Cosmic Control Rod and using it to open an inter-dimensional bridge gate to escape.

The heroes emerge from the gate in Latveria, discovering that many of its people have been absorbed into the Soul Stone. They make their way to Castle Doom where Doom reveals that he is using his people's souls to resurrect a Celestial. The heroes defeat the Celestial, but Doom uses the cosmic power from the Soul Stone to transform himself into God Emperor Doom. The heroes ultimately triumph over Doom, freeing the souls of the Latverian citizens and reviving them. Afterwards, Mister Fantastic reveals that Doom's plans were meant to protect the universe from unknown entities awakened by Thanos and Thane's clash, and the heroes, including Doom, prepare to join forces once more against this new threat.

== Playable characters ==
The game's features a base roster of 36 playable characters, including members of various superhero teams such as the Avengers, the Guardians of the Galaxy, the Defenders, and many others. Thirteen additional characters from Marvel Knights, X-Men, and Fantastic Four, including a hidden fourteenth additional character are featured as paid downloadable content via the post-launch Expansion Pass. Two additional X-Men characters were also added via a free update.

- Black Panther
- Black Widow
- Blade (Note: Available via paid DLC.)
- Cable
- Captain America
- Captain Marvel
- Colossus (Note: Added via a free update.)
- Crystal
- Cyclops
- Daredevil
- Deadpool
- Doctor Doom
- Doctor Strange
- Drax
- Elektra
- Elsa Bloodstone
- Falcon
- Gambit
- Gamora
- Ghost Rider
- Groot (Note: Rocket Raccoon and Groot are playable as a single character; Groot does the walking and uses melee attacks while Rocket rides on his shoulders and uses ranged attacks with his weapons.)
- Hawkeye
- Hulk
- Human Torch
- Iceman
- Invisible Woman
- Iron Fist
- Iron Man
- Loki
- Luke Cage
- Magneto
- Miles Morales
- Mister Fantastic
- Moon Knight
- Morbius
- Ms. Marvel
- Nightcrawler
- Phoenix
- Psylocke
- Punisher
- Rocket Raccoon
- Scarlet Witch
- Spider-Gwen
- Spider-Man
- Star-Lord
- Storm
- Thanos
- Thanos (Infinite)
- Thing
- Thor
- Venom
- Wasp
- Wolverine

== Development ==
The game was revealed at The Game Awards 2018 in December 2018. During that month, it was announced that Team Ninja would be the game developers. The game was released on July 19, 2019.

An expansion pass for the game was announced at E3 2019 which revealed plans for additional content, including story missions, modes, and characters from Marvel Knights, X-Men and Fantastic Four starting in fall of 2019. At San Diego Comic-Con in 2019, Marvel announced that additional characters Colossus and Cyclops from the X-Men would be added to the game via a free update, which was released on August 30, 2019, and revealed the four characters coming in the Marvel Knights DLC pack, "Curse of the Vampire", which was released on September 30, 2019. The contents of the X-Men DLC pack, "Rise of the Phoenix", were detailed at The Game Awards 2019 and announced to be released on December 23, 2019. The Fantastic Four DLC pack, "Shadow of Doom", which includes a new story set after the main campaign, was released on March 26, 2020.

== Reception ==
Reception

Aggregate scores
Aggregator	Score
Metacritic	73/100
OpenCritic	49% recommend (Note: Based on 94 reviews.)

Review scores
Publication	Score
Destructoid	7/10
Game Informer	7/10
GameSpot	8/10
GamesRadar+	4/5
IGN	7.8/10
Nintendo Life	8/10
Nintendo World Report	7.5/10
USgamer	3.5/5

=== Critical reception ===
Marvel Ultimate Alliance 3: The Black Order received "mixed or average" reviews from critics, according to review aggregator website Metacritic.

Tom Marks of IGN called the game "a treat to play alone and with friends alike" in their review. Chris Carter of Destructoid said "There's plenty of room for improvement, but I had fun playing Marvel Ultimate Alliance 3: The Black Order." Game Informer Executive Editor Andrew Reiner noted that the game had enjoyable moments, but also moments where "it all falls apart", awarding the game a 7/10 rating. Nintendo Life writer Dom Reseigh-Lincoln mentioned that the game was fun, however also stating that "it doesn't do anything particularly new or outstanding", giving it a "Great" score of 8/10. CNN's Jacob Krol called the game "An all-around enjoyable experience with few setbacks."

=== Sales ===
Marvel Ultimate Alliance 3: The Black Order was the sixth best-selling game during its first week on sale in Japan, with 9,424 copies being sold. In August 2019, The NPD Group shared the best-selling games in the US during July 2019 and the game was 4th in the ranking, behind Super Mario Maker 2, Fire Emblem: Three Houses and Madden NFL 20. By December 2019, the game had sold 1.02 million copies worldwide. As of December 2021, the game has sold 1.50 million copies. As of December 2022, the game has sold 1.60 million copies
