= Marvel Universe (toyline) =

Action figure line manufactured by Hasbro

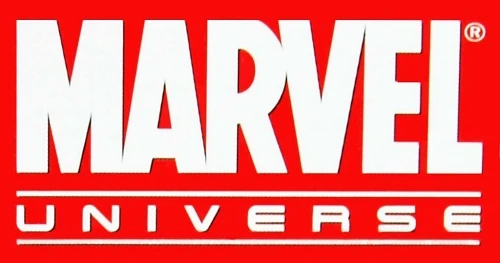
- Type: Action figures
- Invented by: Marvel Comics
- Company: Hasbro
- Country: United States
- Availability: 2009–13
- Materials: Plastic
- Features: Marvel Universe characters

Marvel Universe is a 3 3/4" action figure line manufactured by Hasbro, featuring characters from the Marvel Comics universe. It first hit stores in early 2009 and features detailed sculpting, multiple points of articulation, and accessories. The line was created by Hasbro Designer Dave Vonner.

== Single carded figures – Series 1 (Fury Files) ==
The first series of single carded figures are marketed under the name Fury Files, with Nick Fury appearing on the back of the packaging. Each figure comes with a "Top Secret" envelope which includes a Superhuman Registration Act card and official S.H.I.E.L.D. document for each character. The packages also feature character art by Frank Cho. Variants or running changes that share the same numbering as the original figure are noted by an asterisk to the right of a figure followed by "W#", with # being the wave that the variant was released alongside and "R" representing which Revision case of the Wave. All of Series 1 first prints also came with the blue Nick Fury Exclusive Figure Offer sticker that is located at the top right hand corner of the plastic shell.

=== Wave 1 – March 2009 ===
Number	Figure	Description	Accessories
001	Iron Man	Modern armor	Energy beam
002	Spider-Man	Red/blue costume (light paint)	Translucent webbing
002 * W3	Spider-Man	Red/blue costume (dark paint)	Translucent webbing
003	Silver Surfer	Glossy finish	Surfboard
004	Punisher		Bazooka, rifle, pistol
005	Black Panther		Naginata
006	Wolverine	X-Force costume	Muramasa Blade, rifle
007	Human Torch	Flamed on (translucent)	Flame
008	Daredevil	Light red costume	Nunchaku
008 * W12	Daredevil	Dark red costume	Nunchaku
009	Iron Man (Stealth Ops)	Blue modern armor	Energy beam
010	Bullseye	Light paint	Knife, rifle
010 * W5	Bullseye	Dark paint	Knife, rifle
011	Human Torch	Light blue/black costume	Flame
011 * W3	Human Torch	Dark blue/white costume	Flame

=== Wave 2 – March 2009 ===
Number	Figure	Description	Accessories
012	Captain America	Ultimates version	Captain America's shield
013	Hulk	Green-skinned, purple pants	None
014	Grey Hulk	grey-skinned, blue pants	None
015	Green Goblin		Goblin Glider, Pumpkin Bomb, satchel
016	Ronin	Grey costume	Katana, nunchaku
016 * W12	Ronin	Black costume	Katana, nunchaku
017	Iron Fist	Yellow dragon symbol, open hand	Qi energy
017 * W5	Iron Fist	Black dragon symbol, fist hand	Qi energy

=== Wave 3 – April 2009 ===
Number	Figure	Description	Accessories
018	Black Costume Spider-Man	Blue tint	Webbing
019	The Thing	Light blue/black pants	None
019 * W4	The Thing	Dark blue/white pants	None
020	Punisher	Modern black costume, new head sculpt	Bazooka, rifle, pistol
021	Iron Man	Red/yellow classic armor, yellow arc light Mark V	Energy beam
022	Ms. Marvel	Carol Danvers version; modern costume	Energy projections
022 * W12	Moonstone	Classic costume, new head sculpt	Energy projections
023	Ms. Marvel	Carol Danvers version; classic costume	Energy projections
024	Hand Ninja	Red costume	Naginata, katana, knife

=== Wave 4 – May 2009 ===
Number	Figure	Description	Accessories
026	Union Jack		Pistol, dagger
027	Moon Knight		Cloak, staff, Crescent Dart
028	Red Hulk	Matte finish	None
028 * W4	Red Hulk	Glossy finish	None
029	Blade		Coat, gun, sword, glaive
030	Hobgoblin		Goblin Glider, Pumpkin Bomb, satchel, cape

=== Wave 5 – September 2009 ===
Number	Figure	Description	Accessories
025	Electro	Matte finish	Electric energy projection
025 * W5	Electro	Glossy finish	Electric energy projection
025 * R (2011)	Electro	clear/yellow forearms and hands	Electric energy projection
031	Guardian	James Hudson version	None
032	Spider-Man	Red and black costume, similar to the Superior Spider-Man	Webbing
032 * W5	Spider-Man	Red and blue costume, similar to the Superior Spider-Man	Webbing
033	Iron Man	Silver Centurion Armor	Energy beam
034	Sub-Mariner	Modern costume	Neptune's trident

== Single carded figures – Series 2 (H.A.M.M.E.R. Files) ==
The second series of single carded figures continued under the Fury Files label, but were based around Marvel's Dark Reign storyline, where Norman Osborn has dissolved S.H.I.E.L.D. and replaced it with H.A.M.M.E.R., his own organization. As such, he replaced Nick Fury on the back of the packaging. Artwork was now done by Mike Deodato. Starting with this series, all single carded figures included figure stands.

=== Wave 6 – October 2009 ===
Number	Figure	Description	Accessories
001	Spider-Man	House of M costume	Webbing, backpack
002	Wolverine	Xavier school costume	None
002 * W2	Wolverine	Xavier school costume, new head mold	None
003	Warpath	Black and silver X-Force costume	Daggers
003 * W12	Warpath	Blue and red X-Men costume	Daggers
004	Jean Grey	Jim Lee costume	Energy projection
005	Sunfire	Classic costume	Flame
006	Vision	Silver Age version	Cloak
006 * W12	Vision	Silver Age version (translucent)	Translucent cloak

=== Wave 7 – Feb 2010 ===
Number	Figure	Description	Accessories
007	Iron Man	Extremis armor	Energy beam
008	Captain America	WW2 first appearance	Captain America's shield
008 * R (2011)	Captain America	WW2 first appearance, lighter/brighter repaint	Captain America's shield
009	Luke Cage	modern, black shirt, Fans' Choice Runner-Up! (#1 of 2)	"CAGE" bling, girder, ski cap
010	Bucky Barnes	World War II	two black Tommy guns
011	Black Widow	Natalia Romanova version (red hair)	Machine gun, belt, bracelets
012	Thor	Modern costume	Mjolnir
012 * R (2011)	Thor	Modern costume, with lightning effect repaint	Mjolnir

The Captain America and Thor variants were surprise repaints that appeared in late 2011, primarily at Family Dollar stores in the United States and as such are informally referred to as "Family Dollar variants".

=== Wave 8 – April 2010 ===
Number	Figure	Description	Accessories
013	Colossus	Astonishing X-Men costume	None
014	Juggernaut		None
015	Archangel	Fans' Choice Winner! (#1 of 5), Horseman of Apocalypse costume	Engaged wings
015 * W8	Archangel	Fans' Choice Winner! (#1 of 5), with gold "Death" mask	Retracted wings
016	AIM Soldier		Two guns
017	Kitty Pryde	Astonishing X-Men Costume	Mini Lockheed figure
018	Havok	Fans' Choice Winner! (#3 of 5); modern costume	Energy beam
018 * W8	Havok	Fans' Choice Winner! (#3 of 5); classic costume	Energy beam

=== Wave 9 – June 2010 ===
Number	Figure	Description	Accessories
019	Iron Patriot	Repaint and retool of wave 7 Extremis Armor Iron Man	Energy beam
019 * W9	Iron Patriot	Repaint of wave 7 Extremis Armor Iron Man, with Norman Osborn head	Energy beam
020	Wrecker		Crowbar
021	Iron Spider-Man	Red and gold costume	four waldoes
021* R (2012)	Iron Spider-Man	Translucent red and gold costume	None
022	Winter Soldier	Fans' Choice Winner! (#2 of 5); short hair	Pistol, machine gun
022 * W9	Winter Soldier	Fans' Choice Winner! (#2 of 5); long hair	Pistol, machine gun
023	Mary Jane Watson	Fans' Choice Winner! (#5 of 5)	Mini Ms. Lion figure
024	Skrull Soldier		Ray guns, stand with English language
024 * W9	Skrull Soldier		Ray guns, stand with English language

=== Wave 10 – September 2010 ===
Number	Figure	Description	Accessories
026	Captain Britain	Modern costume	None
027	Wolverine	Team X costume, repaint of Strike Mission Wolverine from the X-Men Origins: Wolverine line	Pistol, machine gun
028	Multiple Man	Ultimate version	None
029	Mystique	Fans' Choice Winner! (#4 of 5)	Machine gun
030	Ghost Rider	Johnny Blaze version	Chain

=== Wave 11 – October 2010 ===
Number	Figure	Description	Accessories
025	Constrictor	Fans' Choice Runner-Up! (#2 of 2)	Whips
031	Dark Hawkeye	Bullseye posing as Hawkeye	Bow and arrow, quiver
032	Yellowjacket		Ant-Man (mini)
033	Iron Man 2020	Arno Stark	Energy beam
034	Thanos		Infinity Gauntlet

== Single carded figures – Series 3 ==
The third series of single carded figures debuted in December 2010 and featured character art by Olivier Coipel (Waves 12 and 13), Simone Bianchi (Waves 14 and 15) and Ed McGuinness (Wave 16). Unlike series 1 and 2, it did not include file cards. The theme is once again S.H.I.E.L.D., but with Steve Rogers now in charge and replacing Norman Osborn on the back of the packaging. Series 3 characters also vary depending on what color of S.H.E.I.L.D. emblem they come with. Most are gold colored, others have black or come in both colors. Images of character on packaging card may also be reversed.

=== Wave 12 – December 2010 ===
Number	Figure	Description	Accessories
001	Captain Marvel	Mar-Vell version	None
002	Doc Samson		Stand with name misspelled "SAMPSON"
003	World War Hulk		Axe, shield, sword
004	Iron Man	Bleeding Edge armor	Energy beam
005	Spider-Man 2099		Translucent webbing
006	Spider-Woman	Jessica Drew version	Translucent webbing

World War Hulk, Modular Iron Man and Spider-Man 2099 packed two to a 12-figure case, with one each of Captain Marvel, Doc Samson and Spider-Woman, plus repacks one each of Iron Man, Captain America and Thor from Wave 7.

=== Wave 13 – April 2011 ===
Number	Figure	Description	Accessories
007	Cable	Messiah War costume / has baby Hope Summers attached to chest	Pistol, machine gun, spear, alternate chest piece without Hope
007 * W13	Cable	Messiah War costume; no baby Hope	Pistol, machine gun, spear
008	Wolverine	First appearance costume; repaint of X-Men Origins: Wolverine figure	None
009	Apocalypse	Modern costume	None
010	Cyclops	Jim Lee costume	None
011	Gladiator		Cape

First Appearance Wolverine, Apocalypse and Gladiator packed two to a 12-figure case, with one each of Cable and Cyclops, plus repacks of one each of World War Hulk, Modular Iron Man, Spider-Man 2099 and Spider-Woman from Wave 12.

=== Wave 14 – July 2011 ===
Number	Figure	Description	Accessories
012	Doctor Strange		
012 * W14	Doctor Strange	Clear astral variant	
013	Falcon		Redwing, clip on wings
014	Scarlet Spider	Standing pose, 'Scarlet Spider' nameplate	
014	Scarlet Spider	Upside-down pose, 'Spider-Man' nameplate	
015	Doctor Doom	Redeco of comic 2-pack figure	
016	Skaar	'Skaar' nameplate	Sword
016 * W14	Skaar	'Son of Hulk' nameplate	Sword

Each figure packed two to a 12-figure case, plus repacks of one each of Apocalypse and Gladiator from Wave 13.

=== Wave 15 – September 2011 ===
Number	Figure	Description	Accessories
017	Ultron	Redeco of comic 2-pack figure	
018	Darkhawk	Modern armor / paint variant	Clip on wings
019	Namor	'Sub-Mariner' nameplate	Trident
019 * W15	Namor	'Imperius Rex' nameplate	Trident
020	X-23	X-Force costume	
021	Captain America	Commander Rogers costume	Rifle, pistol

Each figure packed two to a 12-figure case, plus repacks of one each of Falcon and Doctor Doom from Wave 14.

=== Wave 16 – October 2011 ===
Number	Figure	Description	Accessories
022	Iron Man	Unmasked Extremis armor, 'Tony Stark' nameplate	Alternate helmet head
022 * W16	Iron Man	Unmasked Extremis armor, 'Iron Man' nameplate	Alternate helmet head
023	Iceman		Repaint clear funnel with sparkles
024	Absorbing Man	Human skin version	Wrecking ball
024 * W16	Absorbing Man	Metal skin version	Wrecking ball
025	Astonishing Wolverine		
026	Magneto	Ultimate version	

Each figure packed two to a 12-figure case, plus repacks of one each of Sub-Mariner and Steve Rogers Captain America from Wave 15.

== Single carded figures – Series 4 ==
The fourth series of single carded figures debuted in December 2011. Character art was by Ed McGuinness (Wave 17 and 18) and Mike Deodato (Wave 19, Wave 20 and Wave 21). Unlike Series 2 and Series 3, it did not include figure stands. There was no theme, with the S.H.I.E.L.D. emblem replaced by comic cover shot artwork specific to each figure. Replacing Steve Rogers on the back of the packaging was a rotation of characters: Deadpool (Wave 17), Rocket Raccoon (Wave 18), M.O.D.O.K. (Wave 19), Sasquatch (Wave 20) and Dazzler (Wave 21). And rather than just one saying across a wave, these characters had different text bubbles for each figure.

=== Wave 17 – December 2011 ===
Number	Figure	Description	Accessories
001	Thor	Ages of Thunder costume	Mjolnir
002	Patriot	Masked, button-across shirt costume	Shield
003	Storm		Lightning bolts
004	Shadowland Daredevil	Shadowland costume	Nunchaku
005	Psylocke		Katana, psi-blade
006	Iron Fist	White/light-blue costume with gold accessories	Qi energy

Each figure packed two to a 12-figure case, with no repacks from Wave 16 as this wave has an extra sixth figure.

=== Wave 18 – August 2012 ===
Number	Figure	Description	Accessories
007	Spider-Man (Peter Parker)	Red/blue costume (light paint)	Web satchel (green)
007 * W18	Spider-Man (Miles Morales)	Grey and red Variant	Web satchel (purple)
008	Kraven the Hunter		Knife, spear, necklace
009	Hulk		New sculpt based on World War Hulk
010	Astonishing Beast		
010	Astonishing Beast		Packaged upside-down variant
011	Beta Ray Bill		Stormbreaker

Each figure packed two to a 12-figure case, plus repacks of one each of Green Hulk (Wave 2) and Ghost Rider (Wave 10).

=== Wave 19 – August 2012 ===
Number	Figure	Description	Accessories
012	She-Hulk	Modern Costume	
013	Punisher		Machine gun, handgun, knife
014	Spider-Man	Future Foundation costume	
014 * W19/21	Spider-Man	Bombastic Bag-Man costume	
015	Kang the Conqueror		Gun
016	Scarlet Witch		Red energy projection

She-Hulk, Punisher and Spider-Man (Future Foundation or Bag Head) packed two to a 12-figure case, with one each of Kang and Scarlet Witch, plus repacks of one each of Spider-Man (Wave 5), Thor (Wave 7), Ghost Rider (Wave 10) and Falcon (Wave 14). This is the first instance of new figures being "short-packed" since Wave 13.

=== Wave 20 – January 2013 ===
Number	Figure	Description	Accessories
017	Hercules	1980s Avengers costume	Mace
018	Nighthawk		
019	Nova	Richard Rider Nova Prime version	
020	Puck		Snowbird
021	Angel	Blue and white costume	

Hercules and Nighthawk packed two to a 12-figure case, with one each of Angel, Nova and Puck, plus repacks of one each of Captain America (Wave 2) and World War Hulk (Wave 12), as well as Ultimate Spider-Man, Hulk and Beast (all Wave 18).

=== Wave 21 – November 2012 ===
Released in Brazil, Mexico and select Asian markets in August, but not until November in North America.

Number	Figure	Description	Accessories
022	Professor X		Hoverchair
023	Jubilee		Light burst
024	Blastaar		
024 * W21	Blastaar	Translucent orange hands and eyes	

Each figure packed two to a 12-figure case, plus repacks of Silver Surfer (Wave 1), Psylocke (Wave 17), Hulk (Wave 18), Ultimate Spider-Man (Wave 18), Beta Ray Bill (Wave 18) and Bag Head Spider-Man (Wave 19).

== Single carded figures – Series 5 ==
The fifth series of single carded figures will debut in mid-2013. New character art is by Mike Deodato. Continuing on from Series 4, it did not include figure stands. There was still no theme and it no longer included the comic cover shot artwork specific to each figure that was featured in Series 4. For the first time, the promotional photos on the back of the packaging in some instances featured older figures rather than those new in the current wave.

=== Wave 22 – July 2013 ===
Number	Figure	Description	Accessories
003	Rhino	Classic sculpt	
004	Captain America	Classic costume on new sculpt	Shield
005	Mysterio		Chameleon head under bowl.
006	Elektra		Sais

Each figure packed two to a 12-figure case, plus repacks of Silver Surfer (Wave 1), Black Costume Spider-Man (Wave 3), Iron Spider-Man (Wave 9) and Iron Fist (Wave 17, repainted green). Unlike previous waves, the repacks have been repackaged as Series 5 and inserted into the wave numbering (Silver Surfer 001, Iron Fist 002, Black Costume Spider-Man 007 and Iron Spider-Man 008).

The artwork at the bottom of the back featured Troll.

=== Wave 23 – September 2013 ===
Number	Figure	Description	Accessories
017 *	Cloak		
017 *	Dagger	Considered a variant.	
018	Iron Man	Modern black and silver costume	
019 *	Abomination	Emil Blonsky comic version	
019 *	A-Bomb	Considered a variant.	
021	Grey Hulk	Previous body mold of green Hulk	
022	Baron Zemo	Modified version from team set	Sword, gun

There are two sets of variants in this wave: A-Bomb and Abomination (packaged as "Marvel's Abominations"); Cloak and Dagger (as "Marvel Knights"). Cloak/Dagger, Iron Man, A-Bomb/Abomination and Baron Zemo are packed two to a 12-figure case, plus repacks of Wolverine (X-Force) (Wave 1), Ghost Rider (Wave 10, repainted black with blue trim), Hulk (Wave 18, repainted grey) and Captain America (Wave 22). Continuing the practice for Series 5, the repacks are repackaged and inserted into the wave numbering.

Wolverine (Astonishing) 009, Thanos 010, Wolverine (X-Force) 011, Dark Hawkeye 012, Red Hulk 013, Spider-Man 014, Punisher 015, Nova 016, Ghost Rider 020, Hulk (Grey) 021. Running Change: Colossus 024, Warpath (X-Force) 025.

The artwork at the bottom of the back featured the Watcher. Repacks featured Cosmo.

=== Wave 24 – November 2013 – Final Wave ===
Number	Figure	Description	Accessories
023	???	No figure released or announced	
024	Colossus		
025	Warpath	X-Force Costume	
026	Omega Red		
027	Aurora		
028	Nightcrawler	Uncanny X-Force costume	
029	Black Knight		Ebony Blade

Aurora was announced as a variant (under the name "Alpha Flight") with Northstar (appearing on the back of her packaging), but he was not released until 2015 Wave 3.

Omega Red, Aurora, Nightcrawler and Black Knight are each packed 1 per case. Repacks consisted of already released figures from the previous waves (no new repacks).

The artwork at the bottom of the back featured Sleepwalker.

== Single carded figures – Marvel Infinite Series ==
Hasbro announced at San Diego Comic-Con 2013 that the Marvel Universe toyline would end in 2013, replaced by a new line focused on Avengers in 2014 and shifting to X-Men in 2015. It was then clarified that this was just a rebranding exercise and essentially a continuation of the old line. While promoted to retailers as "Avengers Infinite" (with some characters carrying a "Marvel Platinum" billing), the actual packaging refers only to "Marvel Infinite Series". There is no explicit mention of an Avengers focus, but some subtle iconography (Mojnir, Captain America's star, Iron Man's head and Hulk's fist). The shift in focus to X-Men did not occur, with no changes in 2015 to the packaging nor to the character selection.

Inspired by Hasbro's Star Wars: The Black Series the packaging is on a smaller card with a black background and the toyline name followed by the above-mentioned Avengers icons. There is no front character artwork, but the cardback has a picture of the figure and description, along with thumbnails of each of the other figures in the wave. In a further departure, there is no mention of a series number or of any obvious figure numbering. However, Hasbro.com refers to an item number for each figure (listed on the cardboard insert inside the front bubble), which is referred to below for ordering the figures.

=== Wave 1 (March 2014) ===
Number	Figure	Description	Accessories
A6750	Hulk	Marvel Now! armored costume	
A6752	Grim Reaper		
A6753	Hyperion	Earth-712 version in classic costume	
A6754	Wasp		Wasp mini figure
A8394	Heroic Age Iron Man	Reissue of Series 3 Figure 004	Blast effect
A8395	Captain America	Reissue of Series 5 Figure 004	Shield

Hulk, Grim Reaper and Hyperion packed two to a 12-figure case, with one Wasp, as well as three of Iron Man and two of Captain America.

=== Wave 2 (May 2014) ===
Number	Figure	Description	Accessories
A7918	Thor	Eric Masterson version with helmet	Mjolnir
A7919	Death's Head		Axe, mace, shield
A7920	Whirlwind		
A7921	Red She-Hulk		
A8822	Beta Ray Bill	Reissue of Series 4 Figure 011	Stormbreaker
A8823	Yellowjacket	Repaint of Series 2 Figure 032, Flat Yellow	
A8824	Steve Rogers	Reissue of Series 3 Figure 021	Rifle, pistol

Each figure packed one to a 12-figure case, plus repacks of Grim Reaper, Hyperion, Wasp, Heroic Age Iron Man and Captain America from Infinite Wave 1.

=== Wave 3 (June 2014) ===
Number	Figure	Description	Accessories
A9050	Deathlok		Pistol, rifle
A9051	Ares		Double-bladed axe, sword
A9169	Ant-Man	From cancelled Secret Avengers pack	Ant-Man mini figure
A9170	Cyclops	From cancelled Astonishing X-Men set	
A9171	Valkyrie	From cancelled Asgardians set	Sword
A9311	Omega Red	Reissue of Series 5 Figure 026	

Each figure packed two to a 12-figure case.

=== Wave 4 (July 2014) ===
Number	Figure	Description	Accessories
A6751	Wonder Man	Ionic version of comic pack figure	
B0575	Star-Lord	Reissue from Guardians set	Two kree guns
B0576	Drax	Reissue from Guardians set	Two knives
B0577	Rocket Raccoon	Reissue from Guardians set	Groot mini figure, rifle

Each figure packed two to a 12-figure case, plus repacks of two each of Hulk (Infinite Wave 1) and Death's Head (Infinite Wave 2).

=== Wave 5 2015 – January 2015 ===
Number	Figure	Description	Accessories
B0705	Bishop		Pistol, rifle
B0706	Big Time Spider-Man		
B0707	Black Cat		
B0708	Sandman	Human form with sand hands	
B0709	Sandman	Completely sand version	
B0710	Blue Beast	Jim Lee style	
B0711	Grey Beast	Original furry version	
B0712	Hawkeye	Reissue of Series 2 Figure 031	Bow and arrow, quiver
B0713	Daredevil	Reissue from comic pack Series 2	Nunchaku

Big Time Spider-Man, Classic Sandman and Blue Beast packed two to a 12-figure case, with one of each other figure.

=== Wave 6 2015 – April 2015 ===
Number	Figure	Description	Accessories
B1863	Thunderstrike	Eric Masterson version	Thunderstrike mace
B1864	Shanna		Knife
B1865	Doc Ock		
B1866	Daredevil	Armored version	Nunchaku
B1867	Vulture		
B1870	Ultimate Spider-Man	Reissue of Series 4 Figure 007, Miles Morales version	Web satchel

Each figure packed two to a 12-figure case.

Colossus (as Juggernaut) (from cancelled Astonishing X-Men set) and Northstar (unreleased from Wave 24) both appear as promoted figures on some of the back packaging to this wave, but were not released until the next wave.

=== Wave 7 September 2015 ===
Number	Figure	Description	Accessories
B1868	Colossus	Juggernaut version, from cancelled Astonishing X-Men set	
B1869	Northstar	Unreleased Aurora variant	
B1872	Chameleon		Two alternate heads
B1874	Korg		Shield
B1875	Deadpool	Blue and yellow costume	Sword, knife, gun, bazooka
B1877	Emma Frost	From cancelled Astonishing X-Men set	

Each figure packed two to a 12-figure case.

Scarlet Spider (Kaine version) and Ultron (gold repaint) appear as promoted figures on some of the back packaging of this wave. However, neither were released as Colossus (as Juggernaut) and Northstar were moved into this wave from the previous one. Hasbro announced at SDCC 2015 that Scarlet Spider would be part of a comic pack.

== Single carded figures – Marvel Legends Series ==
At New York Comic Con 2015, Hasbro revealed new carded figures rebranded under the Marvel Legends Series moniker, which had been suggested at on its presentation slides at SDCC 2015. As part of the rebranding, the package art featured the return of character art on the card front, which had been lost under the Infinite Series. The main change on the card back was to feature all the figures in the wave (including the figure on that card). Previously, the Infinite Series had teased just three other figures from that wave, with the assortment varying from figure to figure.

=== Wave 1 2016 – February 2016 ===
These figures were revealed by Hasbro at SDCC 2015 on a single presentation slide, which was then confirmed to be a wave with carded figures shown at NYCC 2015.

Number	Figure	Description	Accessories
B6401	Captain Marvel	Carol Danvers Marvel NOW version	
B6402	Spider-Man Noir		
B6403	Triton		
B6404	Ulik		
B6405	Yondu	Comic version	Bow and arrow, quiver
B6406	Iron Man	Repaint of Mark 1 from Classic Avengers team set, Metallic silver	
B6407	Spider-Man	House of M version repaint from previous 2009 same figure	
B6408	Black Panther		

Each figure packed one to an 8-figure case.

=== Wave 2 2016 – March 2016 ===
The new figures in this wave were revealed by Hasbro at its Marvel Panel at SDCC 2015.

Number	Figure	Description	Accessories
B6911	Spider-Man	Armored version	
B6912	Gamora	Armored version	Sword, blaster
B6913	Living Laser		
B6914	Rage		
B7217	Daredevil	Yellow costume, repaint of Comic Pack Series 2 Daredevil	Billyclub (white)
B7218	Vision	Jonas version/Vision 2.0	
B8229	Ant-Man	Reissue of Wave 3 2014 figure	

Each figure packed one to an 8-figure case, except for Vision that is packed two to a case.

=== Wave 3 2016 – May 2016 ===
Hydro-Man, Quasar, Rogue and Morbius were revealed by Hasbro on its Pulse webpage in December 2015 (and confirmed as being in Wave 3), with the figures first shown at New York Toy Fair 2016 in February 2016.

Number	Figure	Description	Accessories
B6915	Hydro-Man	Modern costume	Water effect attached at waist (no legs)
B6916	Quasar		
B6917	Rogue	Late 1980s costume	
B8230	Morbius		

Each figure packed one to an 8-figure case, along with repacks of Iron Man, Spider-Man, Black Panther (all Wave 1 2016) and Armored Spider-Man (Wave 2 2016).

=== Wave 1 2017 – December 2016 ===
Number	Figure	Description	Accessories
C0320	Moon Knight	Modern costume	
C0321	Wolverine	Laura Kinney version	
C0322	Invincible Iron Man		
C0323	Spider-UK		
C0324	Maestro		
C0325	Lady Deadpool	Reissue from Deadpool Corps set	Sword, Squirrelpool

Wolverine and Invincible Iron Man packed two to an eight-figure case, with one of each other figure.

=== Wave 2 – October 2017 ===
Number	Figure	Description	Accessories
C1485	Magneto	Age of Apocalypse version	
C1486	Captain America	All new, all different Captain America costume	Arm-attached shield halves
C1488	Spider-Man 2099	Red and blue 2099 costume	
C1489	Jessica Jones	Jewel costume	
C1490	Ultron	Gold armor, repainted head	

Case proportions not yet know, includes repacks of Captain Marvel and Spider-Man Noir (both Wave 1 2016).

The Joaquin Torres version of Falcon (from the 2015 All-New, All-Different Marvel publication push) was pictured on the back of card cross sell, but never released.

== Comic Packs – Series 1 (Secret Wars: 25th Anniversary) ==
Each two-pack includes a reprint from Marvel's Secret Wars comic series and features original art from Bob Layton on the packaging.

=== Wave 1 – August 2009 ===
Issue	Figures	Description	Accessories
#1	Captain America Klaw	616 version	Shield
#2	Wolverine Human Torch	Brown and yellow costume Flamed on	Flame
#3	Spider-Man Thunderball	Red and blue costume	Wrecking ball

=== Wave 2 – September 2009 ===
Issue	Figures	Description	Accessories
#4	Hulk Cyclops	Green-skinned, purple pants, different head sculpt than original W2 figure Ross Andru costume, light blue version	
#7	Iron Man Spider-Woman	Jim Rhodes red/yellow classic armor with yellow arc light Julia Carpenter version	
#8	Black Costume Spider-Man Magneto		

=== Wave 3 – Early 2010 ===
Issue	Figures	Description	Accessories
#6	Mr. Fantastic Ultron	Dark blue and white costume	
#9	Hawkeye Piledriver		Bow and arrow, quiver
#11	Thor Enchantress	Classic costume	Mjolnir

=== Wave 4 – March 2010 ===
Issue	Figures	Description	Accessories
#5	Storm Nightcrawler	Mohawk w/ black denim vest Classic	
#10	Absorbing Man Doctor Doom	Absorbing metal classic costume	Wrecking ball Pistol, Wasp (mini)
#12	Bulldozer Thing	Dark blue and white costume	

== Comic Packs – Series 2 (Marvel's Greatest Battles) ==
The second series of Comic Packs are focused on famous battles that occurred in single issues.

=== Wave 5 – August 2010 ===
Comic	Figures	Description	Accessories
Dark Avengers #1	Dark Spider-Man Dark Wolverine	Mac Gargan posing as Spider-Man Daken posing as Wolverine	
Uncanny X-Men #136	Cyclops Dark Phoenix	Ross Andru costume Red/gold costume	

=== Wave 6 – August 2010 ===
Comic	Figures	Description	Accessories
Captain America Annual #8	Wolverine Captain America	Brown and tan costume 616 version, glossy finish	Shield with claw marks
New Avengers #8	Sentry Spider-Man	Red/blue costume, uses House of M Spider-Man body	
Thor #3	Thor Iron Man	Modern version repainted Extremis version repainted	Mjolnir

=== Wave 7 – March 2011 ===
Comic	Figures	Description	Accessories
Wolverine #2	Wolverine Silver Samurai	Black John Buscema costume	Katana, kodachi
Cable & Deadpool #36	Deadpool Taskmaster	Modern costume with cape	2 swords, pistol, knife sword, pistol, shield, bow, quiver with shoulder strap, plastic cape

=== Wave 8 – Summer 2011 ===
Comic	Figures	Description	Accessories
Wolverine: First Class #2	Wolverine Sabretooth	Repaint from X-Men Origins: Wolverine toy line	
X-Men: First Class #1	Jean Grey Cyclops	Modern Era 'First Class' costume	

=== Wave 9 – September 2011 ===
Comic	Figures	Description	Accessories
Marvel Team-Up #65	Spider-Man Captain Britain	Red and blue costume / first Spider-Man to have swivel thighs Classic costume	
Power Man and Iron Fist #79	Power Man Iron Fist	Classic costume	

=== Wave 10 – November 2011 ===
Comic	Figures	Description	Accessories
Avengers: West Coast #50	Quicksilver Wonder Man	Blue and white costume Black and red costume	
Daredevil #132	Daredevil Bullseye	Red Costume, New Sculpt New Sculpt	Billyclub (red) Revolver, throwing knife

=== Wave 11 – December 2011 ===
Comic	Figures	Description	Accessories
Infinity Gauntlet #3	Adam Warlock Thanos	New expression head sculpt, Gold Trim	Infinity Gauntlet and staff
X-Men #1 (Gambit Cover)	Mister Sinister Gambit	Black costume Repaint and slight resculpt from X-Men Origins: Wolverine toy line	Staff

=== Wave 12 – July 2012 ===
Toys R Us Exclusive

Comic	Figures	Description	Accessories
X-Men vs Avengers #1	She-Hulk Wolverine	Purple costume Brown costume	
X-Men vs Avengers #4	Magneto Captain America	X-Men costume	Shield
FF #4	Spider-Man Doctor Doom	Black Costume (FF Version) Grey Costume	Translucent web rope Gun
Amazing Spider-Man #41	Spider-Man Rhino	Repaint of Power Charge Rhino from Spider-Man Line	Web rope

=== Wave 13 – July 2012 ===
Comic	Figures	Description	Accessories
Iron Man #225	Mandarin Iron Man	Red Costume – repaint of Iron Man 2 figure Silver Centurion	Energy sword, helmet
Uncanny X-Men #102	Colossus Juggernaut	Classic Unmasked	
Incredible Hulk #181	Wolverine Hulk	Original costume	

=== Wave 14 – November 2012 ===
Comic	Figures	Description	Accessories
Captain America #171	Falcon Captain America	1970s costume Modern costume, black shadowing	Redwing, Wings Shield
The Defenders #8	Doctor Strange Silver Surfer		Surfboard

=== Cancelled ===
The Secret Avengers comic pack was shown at conventions and was even advertised on Hasbro.com, but never made it to retail though a few of them sold on eBay.

Comic	Figures	Description	Accessories
Secret Avengers	Moon Knight Ant-Man (Eric O'Grady)	Classic costume	

== Comic Packs – Marvel Legends Series ==
At SDCC 2015, Hasbro announced the return of comic packs with two waves revealed.

=== Wave 1 – February 2016 ===
Comic	Figures	Description	Accessories
Captain America #1	Captain America Vance Astro	Sam Wilson costume	Shield
Defenders of Asgard	Thor (Jane Foster) Thor (Thor Odinson)		Mjolnir Axe
Mechanical Masters	Machine Man Iron Man	Superior armor	

=== Wave 2 – July 2016 ===
Comic	Figures	Description	Accessories
Web Slingers	Scarlet Spider Spider-Man	Kaine version Classic costume	
Supreme Powers	Hyperion	Earth-31916 Hyperion Marvel Now! version	
Captain Marvel #1	Captain Marvel Carol Danvers	Green and white costume Carol Danvers masked	

Scarlet Spider (Kaine version) was originally intended to be a single-card release and appears on some card backs for Marvel Infinite Series Wave 3 2015.

=== Wave 3 – August 2016 ===
Comic	Figures	Description	Accessories
TBD	Gamora Star-Lord	Armored version Comic version, white uniform piping	Sword Element Guns
TBD	Rocket Raccoon Groot	Comic version, white uniform piping	Guns Baby Groot in pot

A comic pack with comic versions of Ronan the Accuser and Korath was listed here but never released. The Ronan would have had a Universal Weapon accessory, and Korath would have had beta-batons.

== Marvel GamerVerse Packs ==
While Hasbro seems mainly to have discontinued the G.I. Joe style for Marvel characters with great articulation in the 3 3/4" scale, they have released 2 packs featuring sculpts and molds from the Marvel Universe and other complimentary lines in 2017 and 2018. Each pack is based on a video game featuring Marvel characters.

=== Wave 1 – 2017 ===
Game	Figures	Description	Accessories
Marvel Vs. Capcom Infinite	Iron Man Mega Man X	Mark III armor from Iron Man 2 line	Blast effect

=== Wave 2 – 2018 ===
Game	Figures	Description	Accessories
Spider-Man	Spider-Man Mister Negative	Original game costume with white logo Professor X/G.I. Joe mold with new head	Rubber web blast effect
Marvel vs. Capcom: Infinite	Black Widow Ryu	Age of Ultron mold with new paint and head	Two guns Two alternate hands, blast effect, clear stand for blast effect
Marvel Contest of Champions	Collector Civil Warrior	Re-release of 2016 SDCC exclusive Original character from the game, alternate universe Steve Rogers	Shield, blast effect

== Team Packs ==
=== 2011 ===
Name	Figures	Description	Accessories
Classic Avengers	Hulk Iron Man Thor	Classic head sculpt Gold Mark I armor / repaint and retool of Mark I from Iron Man 2 line Classic costume	Mini Wasp figure Mini Ant-Man figure Mjolnir
Uncanny X-Force	Deadpool Warpath Wolverine	Uncanny X-Force costume / repaint of figure from X-Men Origins: Wolverine toy line / ball joints Uncanny X-Force costume Uncanny X-Force costume / repaint of figure from X-Men Origins: Wolverine toy line / ball joints	Twin swords Twin daggers
Fantastic Four	Mr. Fantastic Invisible Woman The Thing	Modern costume	Mini H.E.R.B.I.E. figure
Fantastic Four (Variant)	Mr. Fantastic Invisible Woman The Thing	Future Foundation costume	Mini H.E.R.B.I.E. figure
Fantastic Four (Variant)	Mr. Fantastic Invisible Woman The Thing	Modern costume Translucent Modern costume	Mini H.E.R.B.I.E. figure
Guardians of the Galaxy	Star-Lord Rocket Raccoon Drax	Modern costume	Mini Groot figure, two pistols Rifle Two knives

=== 2012 ===
Name	Figures	Description	Accessories
Heroic Age Heroes	Iron Man Red Hulk Thor	Modern costume new Sculpt Modern costume	Blue energy blast Mjolnir hammer

=== 2013 ===
Name	Figures	Description	Accessories
Inhumans	Black Bolt Medusa Karnak		
Uncanny X-Men	Wolverine Rogue Longshot		X-Baby Cyclops
West Coast Avengers	Hawkeye Mockingbird War Machine	Black and Silver repaint from the Iron Man 2 line	Bow, arrow, quiver Two batons Projectile blasts

=== 2017 ===
Name	Figures	Description	Accessories
Guardians of the Galaxy	Star-Lord	Re-release with new unmasked head, red uniform piping	Two blasters
Guardians of the Galaxy	Gamora	Repackage	Sword, two guns
Guardians of the Galaxy	Rocket Raccoon	Face repaint, red uniform piping	Rifle
Guardians of the Galaxy	Drax	Repackage with metal shin-guards and face repaint	Two knives
Guardians of the Galaxy	Groot	Red uniform piping	

=== 2018 ===
Name	Figures	Description	Accessories
Deadpool's Rainbow Squad	Deadpool	All identical except coloration	Two swords, dagger, pistol
Deadpool's Rainbow Squad	Foolkiller (Salinger)	Blue	Two swords, dagger, pistol
Deadpool's Rainbow Squad	Slapstick	Yellow	Two swords, dagger, pistol
Deadpool's Rainbow Squad	Solo	Green	Two swords, dagger, pistol
Deadpool's Rainbow Squad	Terror	Purple	Two swords, dagger, pistol

=== Cancelled ===
Hasbro revealed at conventions prototypes of these team sets to be sold in the second half of 2013. However, they were cancelled with an indication that efforts would be made to reintroduce these figures in the rebranded Marvel Infinite toyline.

Name	Figures	Description	Accessories
Asgardians	Thor Valkyrie Executioner		Sword Double-bladed axe
Astonishing X-Men	Cyclops Colossus Emma Frost		

== Gigantic Battles ==
=== Wave 1 – October 2009 ===
This Walmart-exclusive wave includes a regular 3 3/4" scale figure with a larger 12" figure. Each one will be packaged with a comic book, showing the inspiration for the set. An asterisk to the right of the comic title denotes a variant figure or running change in the set.

Comic	Figures	Description	Accessories
Avengers #51	Iron Man Goliath	Classic red/yellow armor, winged mask Blue/yellow costume	
Avengers #51 *	Iron Man Goliath	Classic red/yellow armor, winged mask Red/blue costume	
Secret Invasion #6	Captain America Skrull Giant Man	Bucky costume	Shield, twin pistols, knife

=== Wave 2 – April 2011 ===
Comic	Figures	Description	Accessories
The Mighty Thor #175	Loki Savage Frost Giant		Helmet, axe
Civil War #4	Black Goliath		
Civil War #4	Ragnarok	Thor clone, half-robotic face	Mjolnir

== Masterworks ==
This special line consists of super-sized 19" figures packaged with a regular 3 3/4" figure. The giant figures will all include lights and sounds.

=== Wave 1 – October 2010 ===
This wave has been released. The packaging, with artwork by Mike Deodato, is designed to lie on its side due to the large nature of the product. It includes a flip-open top so consumers can see the figure inside. Hasbro brand manager Scott George provides the voice of Galactus.

Number	Figures	Description	Accessories
Marvel Masterworks Series 001	Galactus Silver Surfer	Classic colors Chrome finish	Surfboard
Marvel Masterworks Series 001 *	Galactus Silver Surfer	Marvel: Ultimate Alliance colors Translucent	Surfboard

=== Wave 2 – Fall 2011 ===
Number	Figures	Description	Accessories
Marvel Masterworks Series 002	Sentinel Wolverine	Classic colors	
Marvel Masterworks Series 002 *	Sentinel Wolverine	Blue and grey	

=== Wave 3 – Cancelled ===
Hasbro revealed at San Diego Comic-Con 2011 a finished prototype of Fin Fang Foom (orange version) for sale in 2012, but it was never released and in 2013 was finally confirmed as cancelled. It was stated by David Vonner that the packaging would prominently feature Howard the Duck with Fin Fang Foom advertised as the pack-in figure, as a humorous reversal of the typical arrangement of the top billing going to the large figure and the smaller being considered a pack-in.

Number	Figures	Description	Accessories
Marvel Masterworks Series 003	Fin Fang Foom Howard the Duck	Orange	
Marvel Masterworks Series 003 *	Fin Fang Foom Howard the Duck	Green	

== Exclusives ==
=== Marvel Digital Comics Unlimited Mail-Aways ===
To receive these figures, one would have to subscribe to Marvel Digital Comics Unlimited website. The character offered seems to change each year, with Nick Fury in 2009 and Archangel in 2010. New York Comic Con 2010 attendees could purchase Archangel as an incentive for subscribing at the convention. In February 2011, Marvel.com offered Archangel to NEW subscribers only.

Number	Figure	Description	Accessories
FURY	Nick Fury	SHIELD uniform	Jet pack, ray cannon, three guns
035	Marvel's X-Force Archangel	X-Force costume	Silver engaged wings
2062	Old Man Logan	Grey hair, duster jacket	Hulk baby
	Victor Von Doom	Maskless and hoodless	Gold-painted Infinity Gauntlet

=== San Diego Comic-Con ===
The following are all single-carded figures with their own special numbering and artwork by Joe Quesada. SD1 through SD4 are packaged together as part of The Invaders Box Set, while the black and white Captain America is sold separately from the set.

Release	Number	Figure	Description	Accessories
2009	000	Captain America (Frozen)	616 version, black/white repaint	Shield
2009	SD1	Captain America	616 version	Shield
2009	SD2	Namor	Classic costume	Shell, trident
2009	SD3	Human Torch	Jim Hammond version	Fireball
2009	SD4	Red Skull	Black Nazi uniform with Hydra armbands	Pistol, baton
2010	∞	Galactus	19" figure with lights and sounds, packed as a single card figure	
2010		Captain America	"Ultimate" version, World War II uniform, ball joints	Shield, gun
2010		Thor	"Ages of Thunder" version	Mjolnir
2010		Spider-Man	Film costume	Translucent web line
2012	Masters of Evil	Baron Zemo		Gun, sword
2012	Masters of Evil	Radioactive Man	Translucent	Gun, sword
2012	Masters of Evil	Tiger Shark		Gun, sword
2013	Deadpool Corps; Taco Truck	Deadpool		Variant head, Taco Shell card
2013	Deadpool Corps; Taco Truck	Lady Deadpool		Taco Shell cards, rifle, sword, pistol, dagger, floatee, laser sword, rubber duck life preserver
2013	Deadpool Corps; Taco Truck	Championpool		Taco Shell cards, rifle, sword, pistol, dagger, floatee, laser sword, rubber duck life preserver
2013	Deadpool Corps; Taco Truck	Kidpool		Taco Shell cards, rifle, sword, pistol, dagger, floatee, laser sword, rubber duck life preserver
2013	Deadpool Corps; Taco Truck	Squirrelpool		Taco Shell cards, rifle, sword, pistol, dagger, floatee, laser sword, rubber duck life preserver
2013	Deadpool Corps; Taco Truck	Dogpool		Taco Shell cards, rifle, sword, pistol, dagger, floatee, laser sword, rubber duck life preserver
2014	The Infinity Gauntlet	Starfox		Snap-on Infinity Gauntlet
2014	The Infinity Gauntlet	Thanos		Translucent Infinity Gauntlet
2014	The Infinity Gauntlet	Death		Skeleton head and hand, alternate human head and hand
2014	The Infinity Gauntlet	Nebula		
2016	The Collector's Vault	Collector		Zodiac Key, Wand of Watoomb, Casket of Ancient Winters
2016	The Collector's Vault	Cosmo the Spacedog	Non-articulated	Zodiac Key, Wand of Watoomb, Casket of Ancient Winters
2016	The Collector's Vault	Howard the Duck	Non-articulated	Zodiac Key, Wand of Watoomb, Casket of Ancient Winters
2016	The Collector's Vault	Lockjaw		Zodiac Key, Wand of Watoomb, Casket of Ancient Winters
2016	The Collector's Vault	Moon-Boy		Zodiac Key, Wand of Watoomb, Casket of Ancient Winters

=== Battle Three-Packs – August 2009 ===
This line consists of themed three-packs and are sold exclusively at Toys "R" Us. Hasbro mislabeled the Soldiers and Henchmen's Chaste Ninja as a "white" Hand Ninja.

Name	Figures	Description	Accessories
Marvel Comics 70th Anniversary	Daredevil Iron Man (Stealth Operations) Silver Surfer	Yellow costume Blue classic armor matte finish	Nunchaku Energy beam Surfboard
Soldiers and Henchmen	Hand Ninja S.H.I.E.L.D. Agent Agent of Hydra	Chaste Ninja colors	Naginata, katana, knife Rifle, pistol Rifle, pistol
Spider-Man and His Amazing Friends	Firestar Spider-Man Iceman	Red/blue costume	

=== Battle Two-Packs – July 2010 ===
These two-packs are exclusive to Target and feature repaints and new bodies for previously released characters. Like the Soldiers and Henchmen 3-Pack's "white" Hand Ninja, Hasbro misrepresents The Hand once again with a new "black" Hand Ninja. In this version, the "black" Hand Ninja is a single individual who has trained extensively to combat exclusively with Wolverine.

Number	Figure	Description	Accessories
001	Iron Man Black Panther	Red and yellow classic armor, blue chest light Dark blue costume, new body	Energy beam Naginata, cape
002	Iron Man Punisher	Modern armor with red and gold Extremis color scheme White gloves, boots, and belt; bandanna and gun strap; new body	Rifle, pistol
003	Spider-Man Green Goblin	Red/blue costume Dark metallic green	Webbing, new head Glider
004	Wolverine Hand Ninja*	Yellow/blue costume Black costume	naginata, katana

=== 35th Anniversary Giant Size X-Men Box-set ===
This set is a Toys R Us and Disney Store exclusive.

Number	Figure	Description	Accessories
	Colossus	Classic costume, shiny deco variant	
	Cyclops	Classic costume, golden visor variant	
	Nightcrawler	Classic costume, Bamf variant	
	Storm	Classic costume, white comic shading variant	
	Thunderbird	Classic costume	
	Wolverine	Ball joints	

=== New York Comic Con 2011 ===
Number	Figure	Description	Accessories
	Compound Hulk	A fusion of Hulk and Red Hulk created by Impossible Man in Hulk #30.	

=== Ultimate Gift Set ===
This five pack was available through Wal-Mart in the winter of 2011 and featured repaints of previously released figures.

Number	Figure	Description	Accessories
	Iron Man	Red and yellow classic armor	Energy beam
	Spider-Man	Red and blue costume	Webbing, web pack
	Captain America	Classic uniform	Energy shield
	Thor	Classic costume	Hammer
	Wolverine	Yellow and brown costume	Katana

=== Avengers Light-Up Base Figures ===
This series is an exclusive to Toys "R" Us. Each figure comes with a light-up base that connects to the bases of the rest of the series to form a S.H.I.E.L.D. platform.

==== Wave 1 – October 2011 ====
Number	Figure	Description	Accessories
001	Captain America	Bucky Cap	Shield, knife, pistol
002	Thor	Modern costume	Hammer
003	Iron Man	Bleeding Edge armor	Energy blast
004	Hulk		None

==== Wave 2 – April 2012 ====
Number	Figure	Description	Accessories
005	Black Panther		None
006	Black Widow		None
007	Captain America	Steve Rogers	Shield
008	Extremis Iron Man	Translucent	None

=== Avengers Super Helicarrier ===
The Comic Con version is marketed under the "Marvel Universe" line while the Toys R Us version is marketed under the "Avengers" line.

Number	Figure	Description	Accessories
Comic Con 2012 Exclusive	Avengers Super Helicarrier	4 Feet Long	Working missiles, Captain America (Shield) and Maria Hill (2 hand guns)
Toys R Us Exclusive	Avengers Helicarrier	3 Feet Long	Working missiles, Captain America (Gold Star on chest, shield)

=== X-Factor Gift Set ===
Released first at San Diego Comic-Con 2012, then Toys R US.

Number	Figure	Description	Accessories
	Cyclops Jean Grey Iceman Angel Apocalypse Mister Sinister	Blue and yellow costume Green and yellow costume Inhibitor belt Red and white costume	

=== New York Comic Con 2012 ===
Was only made available to a very limited number of people invited to a Hasbro event on the eve of the convention.

Number	Figure	Description	Accessories
	Old Man Logan		Baby Hulk

== See also ==
- Captain America: The First Avenger (toy line), a compatible, 3 3/4" Marvel movie toyline from Hasbro in 2011.
- Thor: The Mighty Avenger (toy line), a compatible, 3 3/4" Marvel movie toyline from Hasbro in 2011.
- DC Universe Infinite Heroes, a similar 3 3/4" toyline for DC Comics characters, but with less articulation and slightly smaller.
- Marvel Legends, a 6" scale Marvel toyline from Hasbro, similar in design with some figures upscaled from the 3 3/4" toylines.
