= Rocket Raccoon (limited series) =

1985 Marvel Comics limited series

- The cover of Rocket Raccoon #1, art by Mike Mignola & Al Gordon

Publication information
- Publisher: Marvel Comics
- Schedule: Monthly
- Format: Limited series
- Genre: Science fiction; Anthropomorphic
- Publication date: May – August 1985
- No. of issues: 4
- Main character: Rocket Raccoon

Creative team
- Created by: Bill Mantlo, Sal Buscema, and Al Milgrom
- Written by: Bill Mantlo
- Penciller: Mike Mignola
- Inker: Al Gordon

Collected editions
- Hardcover: ISBN 0-7851-3388-7

Rocket Raccoon is a four-issue comic book limited series that was published in 1985 and featuring the eponymous character. It was written by Bill Mantlo, penciled by Mike Mignola and inked by Al Gordon (Issue # 3 was inked by Al Milgrom). All covers by Mignola and Gordon. The series took place in a half-world where Rocket and his anthropomorphic allies fought killer clowns with lethal juggling balls, deadly unicycles, and speak in a stilted language full of alliteration and rhyme.

== Publication history ==
This series was reprinted as backup stories in the 1980s Transformers (Marvel UK) series. In November 2008, the Rocket Raccoon limited series was reprinted in the Annihilation Classic books.

== Plot synopsis ==
Rocket and his animal companions were genetically manipulated animals with human-level intelligence and a bipedal body construction. They were created to be caretakers of the inmates, or "loonies," on the verdant side of Halfworld. Rocket was a guard who protected the colony against various threats.

Rocket and his friends ultimately cured the inmates of their mental illnesses and then took off into space for their own adventures.

== Issues ==
Marvel Age #25 (April 1985): had a preview of the mini-series and featured Rocket Raccoon on the cover.

1. "Rocket Raccoon/Animal Crackers"—May 1985
2. "The Masque of the Red Breath"—June 1985
3. "The Book of Revelations"—July 1985
4. "The Age of Enlightenment"—August 1985

== In other media ==
- Rocket is one of many members in Marvel to appear in the Capcom fighting series Marvel vs Capcom 3, even though he was part of the much-updated version Ultimate Marvel vs Capcom 3.

=== Collected editions ===
The story was collected in a single volume as an introduction to the early appearances of a number of the characters appearing in the "Annihilation" storyline:

- Annihilation Classic (collects Rocket Raccoon #1–4, along with Bug #1, Tales to Astonish #13, Nova #1, Quasar #1, Marvel Spotlight vol. 2 #6, Logan's Run #6, and Marvel Premiere #1, 240 page hardcover, November 2008, ISBN 0-7851-3388-7, softcover, July 2009, ISBN 0-7851-3410-7)
