= List of Guardians of the Galaxy episodes =

Guardians of the Galaxy is an animated television series based on the comic book super hero team known as Guardians of the Galaxy. The series premiered on Disney XD on September 5, 2015, as part of the Marvel Universe block. As of June 9, 2019, 79 episodes of Guardians of the Galaxy have aired.

== Series overview ==
Season	Episodes	Originally released	
Season	Episodes	First released	Last released
Shorts	5	August 1, 2015	August 29, 2015
1	26	September 5, 2015	December 17, 2016
Shorts	6	February 27, 2017	March 4, 2017
2	26	March 11, 2017	December 3, 2017
3	26	March 18, 2018	June 9, 2019

== Episodes ==
=== Season 1 (2015–16) ===
No. overall	No. in season	Title	Directed by	Written by	Original release date	Prod. code	US viewers (millions)
1	1	"Road to Knowhere"	Leo Riley	Marty Isenberg	September 5, 2015	101	0.39
Star-Lord leads his fellow team members Gamora, Drax the Destroyer, Rocket Raccoon and Groot in raiding an alien prison to free Yondu. They learn from him that Korath the Pursuer has a Spartax artifact called the CryptoCube that he plans to give to Thanos. After getting the artifact from Korath the Pursuer, the Guardians of the Galaxy head to Knowhere, a colony in the severed head of a Celestial. While Drax, Rocket Raccoon and Groot meet with Cosmo the Spacedog, who is the head of security on Knowhere, Star-Lord learns from an alien broker that he is part Spartax. When Korath the Pursuer's group and Yondu's Ravagers attack the Guardians of the Galaxy to claim the Spartax artifact, Knowhere starts to come to life and ensnare everyone. Songs: "Hooked on a Feeling" by Blue Swede and "Funk #49" by James Gang
2	2	"Knowhere to Run"	Leo Riley	Marty Isenberg	September 26, 2015	102	0.51
After the Cosmic Seed briefly brings Knowhere to life, Korath snatches Star-Lord and Gamora to force them to open the box by using a parasite that makes Gamora relive her sins. Meanwhile, Thanos leads his fleet into attacking Knowhere to claim the Star Seed's box. As Star-Lord uses the Continuum Cortex in Knowhere to fight Thanos' fleet, Groot helps Drax the Destroyer fight Thanos. Eventually, Cosmo uses Knowhere's technology to transport the Guardians of the Galaxy and Knowhere to a distant galaxy. After leaving Knowhere, Star-Lord discovers that the Cosmic Seed's box is a map to its location. Song: "Drift Away" by Dobie Gray
3	3	"One in a Million You"	James Yang	Steven Melching	October 3, 2015	103	0.76
After the Guardians of the Galaxy narrowly escape from Fin Fang Foom, Rocket Raccoon accepts an offer to work for the Collector, while the rest of the Guardians of the Galaxy look for special Pandorian Crystals needed to power the map to the Star Seed. What the rest of the Guardians of the Galaxy do not know is that the Collector has plans to add Rocket Raccoon to his collection of alien creatures due to him being the last of his kind. Song: "Walk Away" by James Gang
4	4	"Take the Milano and Run"	Jeff Wamester	Andrew R. Robinson	October 10, 2015	104	0.37
The Guardians of the Galaxy crash land on a space station called Conjunction, which is run by Grandmaster. The Grandmaster seeks to have Drax and Gamora fight each other in the Conjunction Arena. The Guardians of the Galaxy look for Pandorian Crystals from Star-Lord's old contact named Lunatik. They must also keep themselves from being busted by Nova Corps member Titus. Song: "The Boys Are Back in Town" by Thin Lizzy
5	5	"Can't Fight This Seedling"	James Yang	David McDermott	October 17, 2015	105	0.35
On a planet where the next Pandorian Crystal is, the Guardians of the Galaxy find a race of aliens that are under attack by the rock-like Rexians and help to fight them off. Afterwards, the Guardians go on a journey to save Groot when he becomes infected with a parasitic fungus. They also try not to get into conflict with a persistent Titus.
6	6	"Undercover Angle"	Jeff Wamester	Marsha F. Griffin	October 24, 2015	106	N/A
Titus apprehends the Guardians of the Galaxy when they try to infiltrate the Nova Corps Headquarters on Xandar. As part of a deal with Titus, the Guardians infiltrate a notorious gang of weapons dealers called the Black Order, who have been sighted on the desert planet of Eilsel 4. The Black Order plans to obtain the Universal Weapon that was previously used by Ronan the Accuser and give it to Thanos.
7	7	"The Backstabbers"	James Yang	Andrew R. Robinson	November 7, 2015	107	0.36
Following Ronan's death years prior, Korath, Nebula, and Gamora compete to take his place as Thanos' general. Unbeknownst to the other Guardians, Gamora plans to pit Korath and Nebula against each other by pretending to betray them.
8	8	"Hitchin' a Ride"	Jeff Wamester	David McDermott	November 14, 2015	108	0.34
While at an abandoned mining facility on an unnamed planet, the Guardians of the Galaxy are attacked by super-evolved Symbiotes and encounter Yondu's Ravagers, who are after the CryptoCube. After escaping both enemies, the Guardians of the Galaxy are unaware that one Symbiote stowed away. The Symbiote ends up possessing Groot, trapping Gamora and Drax in a cocoon, and changing the destination to the Kree's home planet of Hala so that the Symbiotes can invade other planets. While Rocket Raccoon goes to great lengths to save Groot, Star-Lord must go to great lengths to protect the Cosmic Seed map. Song: "Shake Your Groove Thing" by Peaches & Herb
9	9	"We Are Family"	James Yang	Steven Melching	November 21, 2015	109	0.34
Rocket Raccoon and Groot are abducted and returned to Halfworld, where robots experimented on Rocket and transformed him and other animals. Rocket reunites with his family, who he left behind while escaping from Halfworld, and becomes involved in a rebellion led by the turtle Pyko. The robots eventually see that their experiments were unethical and choose to devolve every animal on the planet, including Rocket's family, in response to Pyko's extreme methods. However, they resolve to continue caring for the animals as the Guardians leave Halfworld and Rocket is left heartbroken. Song: "Funk Funk" by Cameo
10	10	"Bad Moon Rising"	Jeff Wamester	Matt Wayne	November 28, 2015	110	0.30
The Guardians of the Galaxy encounter a living moon called Mandala, who regresses all of them except Star-Lord to their mindset before they met. Star-Lord must work to get them back to normal even when Nebula uses Mandala's energy and a special seed to resurrect Ronan the Accuser. Song: "Joy to the World" by Three Dog Night
11	11	"Space Cowboys"	James Yang	Mairghread Scott	February 21, 2016	111	0.34
The Guardians encounter a powerful gravity storm and make a deal with the Collector to obtain a Repulsar Generator needed to get through it. In exchange for the generator, they will deliver a herd of Moombas to Conjunction in two days. However, they come into conflict with the Nova Corps and the Ravagers, with the latter group having been hired by the Grandmaster to take the Moombas back.
12	12	"Crystal Blue Persuasion"	Jeff Wamester	David McDermott	February 28, 2016	112	0.45
The Guardians of the Galaxy get caught up with the Inhumans royal family (consisting of Black Bolt, Medusa, Gorgon, Crystal, Triton, Lockjaw, Karnak and Maximus), who have contracted a plague that causes crystals to grow on their bodies. The Inhumans must protect their space-faring city of Attilan from Ronan the Accuser as well as thwart the takeover plans of Maximus and the Alpha Primitives.
13	13	"Stuck in the Metal With You"	Jeff Wamester	Todd Garfield	March 6, 2016	114	0.52
The Guardians of the Galaxy come across the Destroyer armor on the planet Retsemaw, which Rocket Raccoon accidentally activates during an attack by the Black Order. When the Destroyer armor is brought to Knowhere, Rocket Raccoon uses it to deal with a bar patron who insulted him until he starts to lose control. As he strongly resents anyone else being labeled a "destroyer", Drax goes up against the Destroyer even when Loki shows up on Knowhere.
14	14	"Don't Stop Believin'"	James Yang	Steven Melching	March 13, 2016	115	0.27
While on Spartax, Star-Lord goes missing while translating the readings of the CryptoCube. Meanwhile, the others dodge the Spartax security force after accidentally damaging a statue of Spartoi emperor J'son during an encounter with Mantis. Even when Star-Lord reunites with the other Guardians, they encounter J'son and end up learning his connection with Star-Lord.
15	15	"Accidents Will Happen"	Jeff Wamester	David McDermott	March 20, 2016	116	0.32
As J'son meets with the Galactic Council members Thor, Irani Rael, the Grand Commissioner of Rigel, and the Supreme Intelligence, Star-Lord meets his half-sister Captain Victoria as they are sent on a diplomatic mission to have one of Spartax's asteroid refineries given to the Kree empire. Meanwhile, the other Guardians stumble upon a plan by Ronan the Accuser and Nebula to destroy the Supreme Intelligence's ship with the asteroid refinery rigged to explode.
16	16	"We Are the World Tree"	James Yang	Mairghread Scott	March 27, 2016	117	0.30
During an unveiling ceremony during J'son's meeting with Thor, Drax the Destroyer gets into a fight with Thor, destroying another statue of J'son. destroyed. As a result, J'son bans the Guardians from his palace while telling Star-Lord to give up on finding the Cosmic Seed. After reactivating the transportation device at Knowhere and reclaiming the CryptoCube, Star-Lord and the rest of the Guardians of the Galaxy suddenly find themselves in Asgard. While trying to figure out the origins of the Cosmic Seed, they must outwit Thor and Angela, who Loki has tricked into believing that the Guardians are invaders.
17	17	"Come and Gut Your Love"	Jeff Wamester	Eric Karten	April 3, 2016	118	0.29
Following a falling out with his father, Star-Lord finds a ship containing the A.I. Rora as he takes it off of Spartax with Drax the Destroyer and Groot providing a diversion for the Spartax royal guards. Afterwards, the Guardians of the Galaxy have to deal with Lucy and Supergiant, who are jilted that Star-Lord is the prince of Spartax. Song: "I Will Survive" by Gloria Gaynor
18	18	"Asgard War, Part 1: Lightnin' Strikes"	James Yang	Marsha Griffin	April 10, 2016	119	0.33
Asgard has declared war on Spartax. After Captain Victoria secretly frees the Guardians of the Galaxy, they must fight their way past J'son's robots and get to Thor to obtain proof that Loki stole the Cosmic Seed from J'son. To make matters worse, Loki takes control of the Destroyer armor to attack both sides.
19	19	"Asgard War, Part 2: Rescue Me"	Jeff Wamester	Steven Melching	April 17, 2016	120	0.42
Upon J'son signaling him to Spartax, Thanos arrives and kidnaps Star-Lord so that he can operate the CryptoCube. The Guardians of the Galaxy must work together with Thor, Angela, and the Destroyer armor to rescue Star-Lord before Thanos can use the CryptoCube's powers to find the Cosmic Seed. In the end, J'son is arrested and removed from his position as Emperor of Spartax. The CryptoCube is destroyed, but Star-Lord has a prophetic dream that reveals the Cosmic Seed to be located on Earth. Song: "Rocky Mountain Way" by Joe Walsh
20	20	"Fox on the Run"	Jeff Wamester	Mairghread Scott	June 26, 2016	122	0.29
Gamora attempts to make amends for her past misdeeds starting with returning the Gravity Matrix that Ronan the Accuser made her steal from the planet Soonevh. Upon arrival and confronting the planet's inhabitants, she is attacked by Nebula and brought to Ronan so that Grandmaster can broadcast her trials across the galaxy. She battles numerous opponents who she previously wronged, including Wraith, who blames her for his father's death; Jarhead, who she reduced to a disembodied brain; and an Elemental Beast whose species she hunted. Meanwhile, the other Guardians must rescue her and reclaim the Gravity Matrix. Song: "Fox on the Run" by Sweet
21	21	"Inhuman Touch"	James Yang	David McDermott	July 3, 2016	123	0.32
The Guardians visit the Inhumans on Attilan, where Black Bolt gives them permission to interrogate Maximus for information about the Cosmic Seed. However, Maximus tricks Star-Lord into freeing him and plots to control the other Inhumans and attack another plant using a Terrigen cannon. Now the Guardians of the Galaxy and the Inhuman Royal Family must work to thwart Maximus' plans and re-imprison him.
22	22	"Welcome Back"	Jeff Wamester	Marsha Griffin	July 10, 2016	124	0.27
The Guardians discover that the Cosmic Seed is back on Earth. In the company of Cosmo, Star-Lord returns to his hometown where he runs into his childhood bully Michael Coogan who is now the sheriff. Now Star-Lord and the Guardians of the Galaxy must find the Cosmic Seed before Korath the Pursuer does. Song: "It's A Wonderful Day" by Kirby Krackle
23	23	"I've Been Searching So Long"	James Yang	Steven Melching	July 17, 2016	125	0.28
When the Guardians of the Galaxy's search for the Cosmic Seed continues on Earth, Star-Lord contacts Gorgon where he gets the location of the former site of Attilan. While checking out the area, Rocket Raccoon, Groot, and Drax the Destroyer have visions of the Cosmic Seed allowing them to achieve their goals. While battling Seed-enhanced worms and spiders, the Guardians must keep Ronan the Accuser and Nebula from getting the box containing the Cosmic Seed. Song: "So You Are A Star" by Hudson Brothers
24	24	"I Feel the Earth Move"	Jeff Wamester	Marty Isenberg	July 24, 2016	126	0.37
Now that Thanos has the Cosmic Seed, he takes control of the Earth and molds it into a weapon of mass destruction. The Guardians of the Galaxy must work to reclaim the Cosmic Seed from Thanos even when Ronan the Accuser and Nebula plan to dispose of Thanos. Song: "Don't Stop Me Now" by Queen
25	25	"Won't Get Fooled Again"	James Yang	Henry Gilroy	October 2, 2016	113	0.39
The Guardians of the Galaxy discover that Yondu and four of his Ravagers have been impersonating them to con the unsuspecting victims of Floodworld. During a heist, a rampaging Groom swallows Star-Lord and Yondu. While Star-Lord and Yondu work to escape the Groom, the rest of the Guardians of the Galaxy and the Ravagers must work to subdue the Groom. Song: "Gotta Get Back" by Kirby Krackle
26	26	"Jingle Bell Rock"	James Yang	Grant Moran	December 17, 2016	121	0.29
After capturing Kallusian fugitive Altru on Knowhere, the Guardians of the Galaxy learn about Star-Lord wanting to celebrate Christmas. When they discover that their employer is a despot named Neeza and that Altru was right about him, the Guardians of the Galaxy work to set Neeza straight and get the Kallusian civilians out of bankruptcy.

=== Season 2 (2017) ===
No. overall	No. in season	Title	Directed by	Written by	Original release date	Prod. code	US viewers (millions)
27	1	"Pick up the Pieces"	Unknown	Unknown	February 27, 2017	201	N/A
Following Thanos' defeat, the Guardians of the Galaxy find the Milano at an overweight state due to the Earth souvenirs they have each collected. Even when they get rid of the souvenirs, the Milano falls from the sky. The Milano crashes on Earth in a swamp. While Rocket Raccoon and Groot work on fixing the Milano, Star-Lord, Gamora, and Drax the Destroyer head out to obtain the parts that Rocket Raccoon needs to fix the ship. On Star-Lord's part, he goes to obtain a fusion reactor that is in the possession of MODOK and A.I.M., after switching jobs with Drax because of Rocket's pranks in the past. At a carnival, Drax the Destroyer looks for a large stuffed teddy bear after switching jobs with Star-Lord. He partakes in the high striker game. When he is angered at the milk bottle toss, he does some wrecking enough for the children to get the stuffed animals. As Rocket Raccoon and Groot continue fixing the Milano, they have an encounter with Man-Thing who goes on a rampage on their ship. As Man-Thing's touch immolates anyone that comes in contact with him, Rocket Raccoon and Groot must find a way to dispose of Man-Thing without getting burned. While looking for a 300 micrometer frequency laser that is needed to repair the Milano, Gamora arrives at an arcade that has a laser tag game. When she enters the laser tag game, she comes to the aid of a young boy named Albert who is being bullied by three kids, who turn out to be his brothers, reminding Gamora of her training days at the hands of Thanos, Korath, and Nebula. As Star-Lord, Drax the Destroyer, and Gamora give Rocket Raccoon and Groot the pieces they need to fix the Milano, Man-Thing reassembles and attacks the Milano. As Rocket Raccoon and Groot get the engines fixed, Star-Lord, Drax the Destroyer, and Gamora fight Man-Thing. Groot then figures out that the ship sprung a leak and was polluting the swamp, which prompted Man-Thing's attacks.
28	2	"Stayin' Alive"	James Yang	Marty Isenberg	March 11, 2017	202	0.20
After the Guardians steal Thanos' asteroid sanctuary from the Avengers and Captain America, Ant-Man, Captain Marvel, Iron Man, and Hulk activate the Avengers' automated defenses, the Guardians of the Galaxy must work with the Avengers to stop a satellite and save many innocent lives. Song: "Sweet Home Alabama" by Lynyrd Skynyrd
29	3	"Evolution Rock"	Jeff Wamester	Mairghread Scott	March 11, 2017	203	0.20
The Guardians of the Galaxy must work again with the Avengers to save the Earth from the High Evolutionary and his hybrid experiments after they abduct Rocket Raccoon, Groot, and Captain Marvel.
30	4	"Lyin' Eyes"	Jeff Wamester	Kevin Burke & Chris "Doc" Wyatt	March 18, 2017	204	0.17
Awakening with no memory on what happened at Starlin' Bar on Knowhere, Rocket Raccoon and Drax the Destroyer find that they have been robbed. Upon tracing the robbery to Yondu, he directs them to the Broker who told him that the items have been sold to a crooked auction house. Now Drax the Destroyer must infiltrate the auction house while dealing with the Blood Brothers as well as Mantis and the Universal Believers who now have Ebony Maw as their latest member.
31	5	"Free Bird"	James Yang	Rich Fogel	March 25, 2017	205	0.25
While searching the Ravagers' hideout for the sarcophagus that Yondu stole from them, the Guardians of the Galaxy fight past the death traps where Groot finds an alien egg that he takes under his care. On the planet Veros Seven, Star-Lord, Gamora, and Groot fall into a foolproof pit trap and are attacked by the Universal Believers, who also seek the sarcophagus. Song: "Boogie Fever" by The Sylvers
32	6	"Girls Just Wanna Have Fun"	Jeff Wamester	Andrew R. Robinson	April 8, 2017	206	N/A
Arriving on Conjunction, the Guardians of the Galaxy are hired by the Grand Commissioner of Rigel to bring his rebellious daughter Princess Tana Nile to Rigel to partake in the Centering, a coming-of-age ritual. In the process, Drax bonds with her as she reminds him of his dead daughter. In addition, the Guardians of the Galaxy must deal with rebel Rigellians called the Empathetics who disagree with the Grand Commissioner's rules.
33	7	"Black Helmet Woman"	James Yang	David McDermott	April 15, 2017	207	0.31
Finding the planet where Yondu left the sarcophagus, the Guardians of the Galaxy are attacked by Nebula who is now in battle armor. During the battle, Gamora dons a Nova Centurion helmet and learns of a cocoon inside the sarcophagus. After Mantis and the Universal Believers attack, Gamora must take the risk and use the helmet despite Irani Rael's warning that it will drain her lifeforce.
34	8	"Right Place, Wrong Time"	Jeff Wamester	Mairghread Scott	April 15, 2017	208	0.34
Following the fight with the Universal Believers, Gamora and Nebula are sucked into the sarcophagus. After the sarcophagus is dumped into a cryo-volcano, Star-Lord unknowingly uses the Quantum Bands, which causes him and Gamora to repeatedly switch positions. As the Guardians of the Galaxy work to retrieve the sarcophagus, Gamora and Nebula infiltrate the High Evolutionary's ship as he plans to experiment on Yondu. Song: "MacArthur Park" by Donna Summer
35	9	"Me and You and a Dog Named Cosmo"	James Yang	Steven Melching	April 15, 2017	209	0.32
Tana Nile is holding a peace conference at Knowhere where the Grand Commissioner of Rigel and the Empathetics are still at each other's necks. The Guardians believe that Cosmo is working with the Universal Believers, but are forced to help him when the Believers drain his psychic abilities and intelligence. Song: "Heaven Must Be Missing an Angel" by Tavares
36	10	"Can't Get It Out of My Head"	Jeff Wamester	David McDermott	April 15, 2017	210	0.30
After the Universal Believers' flagship crashes on Knowhere, the Guardians of the Galaxy plans to find a way to restore Cosmo's intelligence. However, the ship emits energy that causes Knowhere's inhabitants to act like zombies. When Star-Lord and Gamora get infected, the remaining Guardians must get the ship off Knowhere before the zombies can attack Xandar, where the sarcophagus is being held.
37	11	"Rock Your Baby"	James Yang	Mairghread Scott	April 15, 2017	211	0.34
The sarcophagus is opened, releasing a baby that Cosmo identifies as Warlock. As the Universal Believers want to use the Warlock to lead them into a Golden Age, the Guardians of the Galaxy must work to raise him. Meanwhile, Titus escapes prison and attacks the Guardians as Warlock rapidly ages into an adult.
38	12	"Symbiote War, Part 1: Wild World"	Jeff Wamester	David McDermott	May 6, 2017	212	0.22
The Guardians of the Galaxy arrive on Planet X intending to use Warlock's sarcophagus to revitalize it, only to find it infested with Symbiotes that have bonded to the remaining Flora Colossi. Upon being briefly possessed by one, Gamora learns that Thanos used Planet X in an attempt to weaponize the Symbiotes. The Guardians fight the Symbiotes with the help of the "good" Symbiotes who were not rendered feral.
39	13	"Symbiote War, Part 2: I Will Survive"	James Yang	Mairghread Scott	May 6, 2017	213	0.22
Following the destruction of Planet X and Groot reconstituting the Flora Colossi on Planet Y, the Guardians of the Galaxy pursue the Planet X fragment containing the Symbiotes to Spartax where they join Empress Victoria into fighting them. As the Guardians of the Galaxy work to prevent General Glogug from destroying the comet, they receive help from Thor despite objections from the Galactic Council.
40	14	"Symbiote War, Part 3: Thunder Road"	Jeff Wamester	Andrew R. Robinson	May 6, 2017	214	0.22
As Thor returns to Asgard, a Symbiote that stowed away on him bonds to the World Tree and infects Odin and the other Asgardians. Now the Guardians of the Galaxy must make a temporary truce with an imprisoned Loki to fight the Symbiotes before they invade Earth.
41	15	"Back in Black"	James Yang	Tom Pugsley	July 8, 2017	215	0.48
Captain Victoria contacts Star-Lord telling him that an unidentified human is using the missing Nova Centurian helmet and has been issued a bounty of 10,000,000 units. Rocket Raccoon and Groot head out and find the helmet in the possession of Sam Alexander. When the other Guardians of the Galaxy members catch up, they learn that Sam's father Jesse is a member of the Nova Corps who mysteriously disappeared years prior. Sam follows a signal to Spartax and encounters Mantis, who states that she can help him find Jesse.
42	16	"Knights in Black Helmets"	Jeff Wamester	Henry Gilroy	July 8, 2017	216	0.37
Star-Lord learns that J'son is the leader of the Universal Believers. He and the Guardians trace J'son's elemental gun to the inside of a space whale, which houses a Xandarian ship. There, J'son and Mantis trap the Guardians and manipulate Nova into attacking them.
43	17	"Nova Me, Nova You"	James Yang	Grant Moran	July 8, 2017	217	0.32
Rhomann Dey and the Nova Corps catch up to the Guardians of the Galaxy as they are pursuing J'son and the stolen Nova helmet. Meanwhile, J'son attacks Nova on Earth, but discovers that he cannot take his helmet due to it being tied to him. This causes him to target Nova's family, leading the Guardians to fight to protect them.
44	18	"Mr. Roboto"	Jeff Wamester	Steven Melching	July 8, 2017	218	0.24
Following the fight with J'son on Earth, the Guardians of the Galaxy work to find the stolen Nova Helmets. They meet with weapon designer Ja Kyee Lrurt to make an anti-Nova weapon, only to discover that her robotic Sentries are holding her prisoner and intend to build a doomsday weapon to destroy their enemies, the Ultroids. Now the Guardians of the Galaxy must obtain a doomsday device while dealing with the war between the Sentries and the Ultroids.
45	19	"Destroyer"	James Yang	Jonathan Callan	August 6, 2017	219	0.26
When the guardians travel to Drax's home planet in hopes of summoning Adam Warlock, they discover Xeron seeks to destroy Adam and Drax's homecoming, which becomes a fight to protect his friends.
46	20	"You Can't Always Get What You Want"	Jeff Wamester	Rich Fogel	August 6, 2017	220	0.27
Rocket and Adam Warlock travel to Halfworld to try and re-evolve Rocket's family, but accidentally absorb them into their gem, where they are used to be experiments by the High Evolutionary.
47	21	"I've Seen All Good People"	James Yang	Grant Moran	October 29, 2017	221	0.24
Gamora trains Adam Warlock to be a strong and powerful warrior like herself. But when Gamora's lessons become too intense, Warlock clams up and gets kidnapped by the Collector.
48	22	"Another One Bites the Dust"	Jeff Wamester	David McDermott	October 29, 2017	222	0.24
When Star-Lord and Adam Warlock are hunted by J'son and the Black Order, Star-Lord teaches Warlock the importance of never letting himself slip into the path of evil. However, J'son plans to manipulate Warlock into unlocking his full potential.
49	23	"It's Tricky"	Jeff Wamester	Henry Gilroy	November 5, 2017	223	N/A
During the Xandarian Feast of the Three Grinning Moons, the Guardians of the Galaxy must pull a reverse heist by planting a dangerous weapon inside a Nova Corps vault. Song: "Born to Be Wild" by Steppenwolf
50	24	"You're No Good"	James Yang	Mairghread Scott	November 12, 2017	224	N/A
After absorbing J'son into his gem, Adam Warlock has become the Magus] with his sights set on conquering the galaxy starting with Spartax. When the remaining members of the Universal Believers are informed on what happened, they agree to help the Guardians of the Galaxy fight Magus.
51	25	"Behind Gold Eyes"	Jeff Wamester	Marty Isenberg	November 12, 2017	225	N/A
After obtaining Nova helmets, the Guardians of the Galaxy and Nova battle the Magus on Planet Y after he nearly destroys Drax the Destroyer's home planet. However, he tortures them with visions of what they desire to feed on their emotions and empower himself. Meanwhile, Star-Lord and J'son battle within Magus' gem and enable Warlock to retake control. Afterwards, Warlock grapples with his morality before the Guardians remind him of all the good he has done. Song: "Magic Carpet Ride" by Steppenwolf
52	26	"Unfortunate Son"	James Yang	Eric Karten	December 3, 2017	226	N/A
In order to save his teammates from the ruthless android Korvac, Quill must bust his father J'son out of a prison on Spartax due to the fact that J'son made an enemy of Korvac by stealing something important from him....Rora.

=== Season 3: Mission: Breakout! (2018–19) ===
No. overall	No. in season	Title	Directed by	Written by	Original release date	Prod. code	US viewers (millions)
53	1	"Mission: Breakout"	James Yang	Marty Isenberg	March 18, 2018	301	N/A
Collector has trapped the Guardians of the Galaxy in his special prison. Now the Guardians of the Galaxy must break out and escape from Collector. Note: Stan Lee cameos as an elevator operator at the Collector's lair.
54	2	"Back in the New York Groove"	Jeff Wamester	Mairghread Scott	March 18, 2018	302	N/A
The Guardians of the Galaxy are called to Earth by Ant-Man, when a mysterious red symbiote has escaped from Thanos's asteroid. While tracking it down, the team meet Spider-Man, who ends up helping them as the symbiote tries to rescue Thanos.
55	3	"Drive My Carnage"	James Yang	Marty Isenberg	March 25, 2018	303	N/A
As the Guardians of the Galaxy and Spider-Man resume their fight with a Carnage-possessed Thanos, they find that he is going after the Venom Symbiote that is held at Horizon High. After Rocket Raccoon knocks out Max Modell, an attack by Thanos causes Spider-Man to be bonded to the Venom Symbiote as Thanos continues his plan to spread the Symbiotes across Manhattan.
56	4	"I Fought the Law"	Jeff Wamester	Rich Fogel	April 1, 2018	304	N/A
The Guardians have captured Thanos, but it's no easy task transporting the most wanted criminal in the galaxy as they are targeted by Kallusian bounty hunters, Ravagers, and even Rhomann Dey and Sam Alexander.
57	5	"Titan Up"	James Yang	David McDermott	April 1, 2018	305	N/A
The Guardians chase Thanos and Sam Alexander to Titan where they discover a gladiatorial arena featuring Sam's father Jesse Alexander and those that Thanos has trained there.
58	6	"Money Changes Everything"	Jeff Wamester	Javier Grillo-Marxuach	April 8, 2018	306	N/A
As the Guardians of the Galaxy get everything they want after handing Thanos over to the Nova Corps, Rocket Raccoon goes looking for a bounty. He competes with Wraith in capturing alien con artist Ichthyo Pike. Meanwhile, Groot looks for Rocket Raccoon where two criminals rob him and dump his body on a desert planet. He is found by its inhabitants who use him as a scarecrow to protect their water and crops from a group of Gerboids.
59	7	"Sisters Are Doin' It for Themselves"	James Yang	Andrew R. Robinson	April 8, 2018	307	N/A
At the Morag Temple, Gamora finds Nebula there and brings her along in atoning for the damages she has caused to other planets by giving them units which would also have them chased by its inhabitants. Unfortunately for them, Yondu and Kraglin lead the Ravagers into raiding the same planets in order to steal the units given to them. Now Gamora and Nebula must work together to reclaim each of the units and defeat the Ravagers.
60	8	"We Are the Champions"	Jeff Wamester	David McDermott	April 15, 2018	308	N/A
While on Knowhere, Drax is not feeling like being a destroyer as various opponents try to claim his title. With help from Broker, Drax tries various odd jobs around Knowhere until he has an encounter with the self-proclaimed Champion of the Universe.
61	9	"Fame"	James Yang	Steven Melching	April 15, 2018	309	N/A
On Conjunction, Star-Lord starts his own TV show called "Star-Lord's Super Awesome Variety Hour" where his guests include Fandral and a "Mystery Ex" segment that features Lucy and Supergiant. Other things seen on the Conjunction Galactic Network including a news report of a hijacked Nova Star Blaster that Rocket Raccoon and Groot are in, the TV show N.O.V.A.S. starring the Nova Corps where Rhomann Dey rescued Gamora's escape pod, and a commercial for "Drax the Flame Broiler." Note: This episode did not air on Disney XD and "I Fought the Law" aired on its scheduled date. Instead, this episode was first shown on the Watch Disney XD website and this episode aired the week after its intended airdate.
62	10	"Happy Together"	Jeff Wamester	Liza Palmer & Mairghread Scott	April 22, 2018	310	N/A
Squandering their riches and barely getting the Milano away from the impound lot, the Guardians of the Galaxy take a transportation job that is offered to them by Howard the Duck where the item he needs is in Kallusian space. Though they are unaware that they are stealing from the Kree and have an encounter with a Kree Accuser named Phyla-Vell.
63	11	"Gotta Get Outta This Place"	James Yang	Henry Gilroy	April 22, 2018	311	N/A
The Guardians of the Galaxy find themselves in a Kree prison called the Kree Monolith of Justice run by Doctor Minerva after they have stolen their "package" which is then taken by Howard the Duck. Under orders of the Supreme Intelligence, Doctor Minerva is to torture them into confessing before they are put to death. Rocket Raccoon comes up with a plan to get them out.
64	12	"Long Distance Runaround"	Jeff Wamester	Eric Karten	April 29, 2018	312	N/A
In order to find out who set them up after escaping the Kree Monolith of Justice, the Guardians of the Galaxy track down Howard the Duck at Knowhere. He confesses that Collector made him set the Guardians of the Galaxy up in exchange for seeing the outside of his tower and also double-crossed him. Phyla-Vell continues to pursue the Guardians of the Galaxy as Collector has sabotaged the Milano to attack Hala.
65	13	"You Don't Own Me"	James Yang	Mairghread Scott	April 29, 2018	313	N/A
After Collector apparently destroys the Kree planet Hala, Phyla-Vell teams up with the Guardians of the Galaxy to bring him to justice. They discover that Collector converted the specific Kree technology called the black hole generator into a molecular compression engine to shrink Hala.
66	14	"Black Vortex, Part 1"	Leo Riley	David McDermott	May 5, 2019	314	N/A
To escape the destruction of the Collector's base, the Guardians travel inside a mirror artifact called the Black Vortex. This artifact holds a dimension that takes on any form and each one of them winds up in a crazy (and differently animated) situation. Birds of a Feather: Gamora becomes the princess in a children's story dimension with woodland creatures that turn into monsters when they are sad. This episode spoofs several Disney movies, including Snow White and the Seven Dwarfs, Bambi, Cinderella, and Sleeping Beauty. In addition, "The Whistling Song" is similar to, and clearly inspired by "Whistle While You Work". Heroes: Drax becomes the main protagonist in a Spider-Man-esque comic book dimension as Drax-Man where he got his powers from Kronos following an attack by Thanos when driving home from Las Vegas. Drax gets into an argument with the narrator while dealing with his boss J. Jonah J'son (a hybrid depiction of J. Jonah Jameson and J'son) and fighting Print-Press Paul.
67	15	"Black Vortex, Part 2"	Leo Riley	Trevor Devall	May 5, 2019	315	N/A
Reclaiming her com link, Gamora contacts the others to try and help them fight their way through the Black Vortex. Stand and Deliver: Rocket Raccoon finds himself in the Timely Distribution Corporate Warehouse as he works to find Groot as what appears to be a smaller Groot is about to the shipped to the Waytheflargoutus System at the edge of the galactic frontier as Rocket is scheduled to be shipped to the Krutackanfarawayus System at the opposite edge of the galactic frontier. Color My World: Groot appears in a CGI dimension that resembles Knowhere, where he is speaking in full sentences and everyone else speaks their name like Groot did. Then he finds himself on a version of Planet X with younger Flora Colossi. After they are corrupted by an incoming wave, Groot realizes that he is actually in the heart of the Black Vortex, where he has an encounter with its entity.
68	16	"Black Vortex, Part 3"	Leo Riley	Sib Ventress	May 12, 2019	316	N/A
With Groot in danger, the other Guardians follow the branches he left for them to the exit. I Melt With You: Star-Lord appears in a claymation dimension where he must work to turn the Milano around before it heads into the Sun. However, his arm detaches and Star-Lord duels with it so that he can get it reattached before he is melted by the Sun. Getting in Toon: Rocket Raccoon ends up in a retro black and white cartoon dimension where an alien woman calls Ronan the Exterminator to get rid of him. Drax catches up with Rocket as they work to keep Ronan from getting their branches of Groot.
69	17	"Black Vortex, Part 4"	James Yang	Steven Melching	May 12, 2019	317	N/A
Getting closer to the exit, the Guardians deal with the Black Vortex entity face to face. Jump: Star-Lord and Gamora end up in an 8-bit video game dimension where they fight their way past the F'saki, enemy versions of Ronan the Accuser, and an evil wizard version of J'son. Luckily, they have a few cheat codes to speed things up with. Reflections of My Life: Reunited at last (and back to their properly animated selves), Star-Lord, Gamora, Drax and Rocket end up in the center of the Black Vortex, where they must stop the Black Vortex entity from escaping into reality and shrouding the galaxy into pure darkness. Along the way, they must fight a Ronan/J'son fusion monster, and free Groot from the entity's possession.
70	18	"Blame It on the Boss of Nova"	Jeff Wamester	Adam Beechen	May 19, 2019	318	N/A
After escaping the Black Vortex, the Guardians of the Galaxy find themselves in a museum honoring them after their apparent deaths. In addition, they run into Rhomann Dey, who states that Irani Rael has turned the entire galaxy into a police state, where any Nova Corps member who opposes her is either demoted or arrested. The Guardians of the Galaxy realize that Nova Prime has been replaced by a robot duplicate.
71	19	"The Real Me"	James Yang	Mairghread Scott	May 19, 2019	319	N/A
When the Guardians of the Galaxy return to Knowhere, Valkyrie arrives to take the Guardians of the Galaxy to Asgard under the orders of Thor. Valkyrie states that the robots in question are Darkhawks who previously invaded Asgard until the Asgardians banished them to their own private realm. Before that can happen, they contend with robot versions of J'Que, Cosmo, and Star-Lord.
72	20	"Paranoid"	Jeff Wamester	David McDermott	May 26, 2019	320	N/A
Now in Asgard, the Guardians and Valkyrie meet up with Thor who just returned from the Galactic Council where they plan to stop the Darkhawk invasion. After a fight with the Destroyer, the Guardians of the Galaxy are imprisoned along with Thor and Loki for disobeying Odin's laws while Heimdall and Valkyrie are reassigned to guard Odin's chambers. During this time, it is revealed that the Darkhawks were created by Odin's brother Serpent in an earlier plot to conquer Asgard. The Guardians begin accusing one another of being Darkhawks, unaware that they brought along a robot duplicate of Rocket.
73	21	"Darkhawks on the Edge of Town"	James Yang	Danielle Wolff	May 26, 2019	321	N/A
With Odin approving their plan, the Guardians of the Galaxy travel to the Darkhawk Realm to free Rocket, the whole Galactic Council, and the entire population of Knowhere while also planting the explosive from the Darkhawk Rocket Raccoon at the energy core in the Darkhawk Realm. Though they will have to contend with Serpent.
74	22	"Holding Out for a Hero"	Jeff Wamester	Henry Gilroy	June 2, 2019	322	N/A
Serpent has escaped from the Darkhawk Dimension and has infected the World Tree as part of his plans to reclaim Asgard. After taking Gungir from Odin and incapacitating most of the Asgardians, the Guardians of the Galaxy must work with Loki to defeat Serpent. Though they will have to get through the Forge of Asgard and the Stone Giant that guards it first.
75	23	"With a Little Help From My Friends"	James Yang	Marty Isenberg	June 2, 2019	323	N/A
Now that Serpent is in control of Asgard and Thor and Odin have been incapacitated, the Guardians of the Galaxy and Loki are adrift in a fragment of the Bifrost Bridge. Using its power, Loki sends the Guardians of the Galaxy to the different parts of the galaxy to gather reinforcements. Rocket Raccoon gains Iron Man and Hulk, Groot gains Yondu and Nebula during the Ravagers' operation on Veros Seven, Gamora gains Sam Alexander, Star-Lord gains Howard the Duck on Conjunction after a brief scuffle with the Champion of the Universe, and Drax helping Cosmo deal with Knowhere's mixed feelings.
76	24	"Breaking Stuff is Hard to Do"	Jeff Wamester	David McDermott	June 9, 2019	TBA	N/A
Having obtained some allies to help fight the Serpent, Loki states that they will need the fragments of the sword Dragonfang which was forged in Asgard's great forge by Odin and shattered when Hela last used on the corrupted World Tree. The first fragment is Soonevh, which Rocket Raccoon, Groot, Howard the Duck, and Cosmo work to obtain from its nearby star. The second fragment is in a military base on Sirius IV which Gamora, Drax, and Hulk work to obtain while avoiding Ultroids. The spores of the corrupted World Tree has started draining the plant life on Dasos causing Star-Lord, Nova, Yondu, and Nebula to go to the planet's aid.
77	25	"Killer Queen"	James Yang	Mairghread Scott	June 9, 2019	TBA	N/A
The final Dragonfang fragment is in Niflheim, where Hela rules and where nobody has ever made it out alive. With Hela bitter that Odin banished her after Dragonfang broke on Serpent, Loki plans to use his charms to persuade Hela to help them fight Serpent. Even when Dragonfang is reforged, Hela is shown to have Serpent as her guest so that he can obtain Loki. Though Hela will not give up Iron Man or Dragonfang. With the rest of the Guardians of the Galaxy imprisoned, Hela keeps Rocket as a lap dog so that she can have him open the box containing her full power and her way out of Niffleheim.
78	26	"Just One Victory"	Jeff Wamester	Marty Isenberg	June 9, 2019	TBA	N/A
Rhomann Dey rescues the Guardians of the Galaxy from being stranded in space. They learn that Serpent and his corrupted World Tree spores have defeated all Nova Corps members that have been sent to Asgard. As Irani Rael states that the Rigellians, Spartax, and Kree military forces are busy battling a siege to help fight Serpent, the Guardians of the Galaxy have no choice but to enlist the help of Thanos who is a fan of Hela's work.

== Shorts ==
=== Season 1 (Aug 2015) ===
The stories of five outlaws who became the Guardians.

No. overall	No. in season	Title	Directed by	Written by		Original release date	US viewers (millions)
1	1	"Star-Lord"	Unknown	Unknown	Studio Mir	August 1, 2015	N/A
A young Star-Lord meets the Ravagers led by Yondu upon being abducted by them.
2	2	"Groot"	Unknown	Unknown	Studio Mir	August 8, 2015	N/A
The story of Groot's old home planet is told where it was decimated by Ronan the Accuser.
3	3	"Rocket Raccoon"	Unknown	Unknown	Studio Mir	August 15, 2015	N/A
A group of robots on Halfworld enhance a simple raccoon into Rocket Raccoon. It also tells how he met up with Groot.
4	4	"Drax"	Unknown	Unknown	Studio Mir	August 22, 2015	N/A
It is revealed how Drax the Destroyer ended up in Nova Corps custody after he saved some prisoners from Ronan the Accuser.
5	5	"Gamora"	Unknown	Unknown	Studio Mir	August 29, 2015	N/A
Gamora is freed from Thanos' control while on a mission with Thanos' other minions known as Nebula and Korath the Pursuer.

=== Season 2 (Feb–Mar 2017) ===
No. overall	No. in season	Title	Directed by	Written by	Original release date	US viewers (millions)
1	1	"Pick up the Pieces"	Unknown	Unknown	February 27, 2017	N/A
Following Thanos' defeat, the Guardians of the Galaxy find the Milano at an overweight state due to the Earth souvenirs they have each collected. Even when they get rid of the souvenirs, the Milano falls from the sky.
2	2	"Star-Lord vs. MODOK"	Unknown	Unknown	February 28, 2017	N/A
The Milano crashes on Earth in a swamp. While Rocket Raccoon and Groot work on fixing the Milano, Star-Lord, Gamora, and Drax the Destroyer head out to obtain the parts that Rocket Raccoon needs to fix the ship. On Star-Lord's part, he goes to obtain a fusion reactor that is in the possession of MODOK and A.I.M., after switching jobs with Drax because of Rocket's pranks in the past.
3	3	"Drax Attacks!"	Unknown	Unknown	March 1, 2017	N/A
→At a carnival, Drax the Destroyer looks for a large stuffed teddy bear after switching jobs with Star-Lord. He partakes in the high striker game. When he is angered at the milk bottle toss, he does some wrecking enough for the children to get the stuffed animals.
4	4	"Rocket! Groot! Man-Thing!"	Unknown	Unknown	March 2, 2017	N/A
As Rocket Raccoon and Groot continue fixing the Milano, they have an encounter with Man-Thing who goes on a rampage on their ship. As Man-Thing's touch immolates anyone that comes in contact with him, Rocket Raccoon and Groot must find a way to dispose of Man-Thing without getting burned.
5	5	"Gamora Strikes!"	Unknown	Unknown	March 3, 2017	N/A
While looking for a 300 micrometer frequency laser that is needed to repair the Milano, Gamora arrives at an arcade that has a laser tag game. When she enters the laser tag game, she comes to the aid of a young boy named Albert who is being bullied by three kids, who turn out to be his brothers, reminding Gamora of her training days at the hands of Thanos, Korath, and Nebula.
6	6	"Guardians Reunited!"	Unknown	Unknown	March 4, 2017	N/A
As Star-Lord, Drax the Destroyer, and Gamora give Rocket Raccoon and Groot the pieces they need to fix the Milano, Man-Thing reassembles and attacks the Milano. As Rocket Raccoon and Groot get the engines fixed, Star-Lord, Drax the Destroyer, and Gamora fight Man-Thing. Groot then figures out that the ship sprung a leak and was polluting the swamp, which prompted Man-Thing's attacks.
