= List of Marvel Comics characters: Q =

== Quagmire ==
Quagmire (Jerome Meyers) is a character appearing in American comic books published by Marvel Comics. He first appeared in Squadron Supreme #4 (December 1985), and was created by Mark Gruenwald.

Quagmire is a mutant with the ability to manipulate the Darkforce in the form of a thick, tar-like substance, which he can use to adhere to walls and ceilings. Initially an enemy of the Squadron Supreme and member of the Institute of Evil, Quagmire reforms after being put through a behavior modification process and joins the Squadron.

Quagmire is injured and rendered comatose while saving civilians from an industrial accident. While comatose, he interfaces with the Darkforce, drowning Doctor Decibel and flooding the hospital with Darkforce until Hyperion disconnects his life support. Quagmire is sucked into the Darkforce and presumed dead. Quagmire is later revealed to have survived and travels to Earth-616 through Man-Thing's body, which restores his criminal personality.

== Quantum ==
Quantum is the name of two characters in Marvel Comics.

=== Lomen ===
- Further reading: Quantum at the Comic Book DB (archived from the original); Quantum at the Grand Comics Database

Lomen is an alien soldier from the planet Dakkam and a member of a platoon known as the Elect. After discovering that exposure to Earth's sunlight gave one Dakkamite renegade superpowers, Dakkamite scientists seek to replicate the process by placing other Dakkamites in capsules close to the sun. Lomen awakens from the treatment after his comrades and discovers that they have left without him. While searching for his comrades, Lomen assumes the alias of Quantum and joins a supervillain team assembled by Graviton alongside Halflife and Zzzax. Graviton and his allies are defeated by the West Coast Avengers. Quantum, no longer believing in Graviton's promises, abandons the team.

Quantum later encounters Wundarr the Aquarian, the Dakkamite who originally inspired the plan to enhance Dakkamite soldiers. Quantum considers Wundarr to be a traitor to Dakkam and attempts to kill him. However, Quasar intervenes, saves Wundarr, and traps Quantum in an intangible state. During the "Annihilation" storyline, Quantum reappears as a resident of the planet Godthab Omega, having been drawn there by Glorian.

=== Space Stone bearer ===
An unidentified person working for Assessor came into contact with the Space Stone.

== Quasimodo ==
- Further reading: Quasimodo at the Comic Book DB (archived from the original); Quasimodo at the Grand Comics Database

Quasimodo is a character appearing in American comic books published by Marvel Comics. The character was created by Stan Lee and Jack Kirby and first appeared in Fantastic Four Annual #4 (November 1966).

Quasimodo (Quasi-Motivational Destruct Organ) is a computer created and abandoned by Mad Thinker. The Silver Surfer finds Quasimodo and, feeling pity for his desire to be human, grants him a partially organic cyborg body. Quasimodo becomes enraged by his feelings of inferiority compared to the Silver Surfer, battles him, and is rendered immobile by the Surfer.

While battling Vision, Quasimodo's consciousness is expelled into space. During the "Dark Reign" storyline, Quasimodo returns to Earth and works for Norman Osborn as an analyst, compiling information on various entities and determining whether or not they are a threat or would be of good use to Osborn.

=== Quasimodo in other media ===
Quasimodo appears in The Avengers: Earth's Mightiest Heroes #2.

== Queen ==
Queen is the name of several characters appearing in American comic books published by Marvel Comics.

=== Queen (robot) ===
Queen is a robot who was built by Charles Rengel. He used Queen on Hulk who destroyed it.

=== Indries Moomji ===
Indries Moomji operates as Queen in Obadiah Stane's Chessmen and played a hand in Stane's takeover of Stark Industries.

=== All-Mother ===
The All-Mother, created by Paul Tobin and Pepe Larraz, first appears in Spider-Island: The Amazing Spider-Girl #2 (November 2011). During the "Spider-Island" event, the All-Mother leads the Society of the Wasp against spider-powered individuals, planning to kill them all. The All-Mother reluctantly works with Spider-Girl to battle the Man-Spiders, only to be killed by the Hobgoblin.

=== Poisons ruler ===
There is a Queen who is the ruler of the Poisons.

== Queen of Angels ==
The Queen of Angels is the ruler of the Angels in the realm of Heven.

== Quicksand ==
Quicksand is a supervillain, created by Tom DeFalco and Ron Frenz, who first appeared in Thor 392.

A woman of Vietnamese descent, Quicksand was once a scientist working at a nuclear facility. An accident transforms her body into a sand-like substance (similar to Sandman). Quicksand attacks the nuclear reactor in a rage, hoping to get revenge for the accident and shut it down. Thor confronts her and prevents disaster by using his hammer to transport the entire facility to another dimension, and Quicksand escapes. She is later contacted by Mongoose on behalf of Count Tagar, who wants a cell sample from Thor to create a race of gods. She initially refuses, but is persuaded when Mongoose demonstrates a device which can temporarily transform her back into human form. She barely holds her own in battle, and escapes again once the sample is collected.

Since then, Quicksand has apparently resigned herself to her transformation, even reveling in the power and profit she has enjoyed as a professional super-criminal. She serves for a time with Superia's Femizons, Crimson Cowl's Masters of Evil, the Thunderbolts, and the Women Warriors, Delaware's sanctioned superhero team.

=== Powers and abilities of Quicksand ===
Quicksand's strength, speed, stamina, agility, reflexes, and durability have all been enhanced as a result of exposure to atomic radiation. Her altered body provides her with protection from physical and energy attacks. She has the ability to transform into a malleable sand-like substance which can be hardened, dispersed, or shaped according to her will. She can increase her size and mass to an unknown extent when in sand-form, and can manipulate it for various effects. She has used this ability to form hammers, elongate parts of her body, and fire blasts of sand.

== Quickshot ==
Quickshot is a vampire and a member of the Forgiven.

== Quill ==
Quill is the name of several characters appearing in Marvel Comics.

=== Warpie Quill ===
Quill first appeared in Captain Britain (vol. 2) #7 and was created by Jamie Delano and Alan Davis. He is one of the Warpies, a group of superhumans created by Jaspers' Warp. Quill and his fellow Warpies are taken in by the government organization Resources Control Executive (R.C.X.). Quill and several of the Warpies are trained for combat and form the Cherubim. Led by Quill, the Cherubim attack Captain Britain, but are stopped by him and his sister Betsy Braddock.

The Warpies begin losing their powers and are abducted by Black Air, who experiments on them to maintain their powers. Under Mastermind's leadership, the Warpies attack the Captain Britain Corps. They were defeated by Captain Britain, who removes their powers.

When powered, Quill's body is covered in barbs, and he has razor-sharp claws.

=== Max Jordan ===
Quill (Max Jordan) first appeared in New X-Men: Academy X #1 and was created by Nunzio DeFilippis and Christina Weir. He is a student at the Xavier Institute and a mutant who possesses porcupine-like quills on his body. When the students are each assigned to squads, Quill is assigned to Cyclops's Corsairs squad.

Quill is killed during William Stryker's attack on the Xavier Institute shortly after M-Day. Long after his death, Quill is resurrected by the Five on Krakoa.

Max is covered in porcupine-like quills that he can shoot from his body or use as a shield.

=== Quill in other media ===
- A character inspired by Quill and miscredited as "Kid Omega" appears in X-Men: The Last Stand, portrayed by Ken Leung. The writer/director commentary on the film's home release clarified that the credits were mistaken and that the character is intended to be Quill. This version is a member of the Omegas, who join forces with Magneto's Brotherhood in opposing a "mutant cure", only to be killed by the Phoenix.
- Quill's voice appears in a voicemail message for Xavier's School for Gifted Youngsters, which is included as a bonus feature on the home release of X-Men: Apocalypse.
- A female variant of Quill appears in Deadpool & Wolverine, portrayed by an uncredited Nilly Cetin. This version is a follower of Cassandra Nova.

== Meredith Quill ==
- Further reading: Meredith Quill at the Comic Book DB (archived from the original); Meredith Quill at the Grand Comics Database

Meredith Quill is the mother of Peter Quill / Star-Lord and the wife of J'son. The Earth-791 version of the character was created by Steve Englehart, Steve Gan and Bob McLeod, and first appeared in Marvel Preview #4 (January 1976). The Earth-616 version of the character was created by Brian Michael Bendis and Steve McNiven, and first appeared in Marvel Now! Point One #1 (December 2012).

=== Earth-791 ===
Meredith Quill encountered J'son after witnessing his spaceship crash near her. She nurses him back to health and they enter a relationship, but he eventually leaves Earth and erases her memories of him. A month later, Meredith rekindles her romance with an old acquaintance, Jake Quill, and marries him. When Meredith gives birth to Peter, his appearance is different from either parent, leading Jake to try and kill Meredith out of a belief that she had cheated on him. However, he suffers a fatal heart attack, leaving Meredith to raise Peter on her own. Meredith is later killed by unidentified aliens, leaving Peter an orphan.

=== Earth-616 ===
The Earth-616 incarnation of Meredith Quill has a history similar to her original counterpart. However, she was instead killed by the Badoon, and J'son gifted her his element gun before leaving Earth.

=== Meredith Quill in other media ===
- An amalgamated incarnation of Meredith Quill appears in Guardians of the Galaxy (2015), voiced by Vanessa Marshall. Like the comics incarnation, this version gave birth to Peter Quill following a relationship with J'son, but died in a similar manner as the MCU incarnation (see below).
- Meredith Quill appears in films set in the Marvel Cinematic Universe (MCU), portrayed by Laura Haddock.
  - First appearing in Guardians of the Galaxy (2014), she gives Peter Quill a mixtape of her favorite songs before dying of terminal cancer.
  - Meredith appears in the prologue of Guardians of the Galaxy Vol. 2, in which it is revealed she pursued a relationship with Ego, who secretly gave her the tumor that killed her.
- Meredith Quill appears in Guardians of the Galaxy: The Telltale Series, voiced by Courtenay Taylor. In a flashback, Peter Quill promises her not to use violence if he confronts bullies. Additionally, she previously encountered Yondu, who took in Peter on her advice. Following Hala the Accuser's defeat, the player has the option to either have Mantis help Peter contact Meredith's spirit or use the Eternity Forge to revive her.
- Meredith Quill appears in Marvel's Guardians of the Galaxy, voiced by Mylène Dinh-Robic. This version was killed by the Chitauri.

== Q'Wake ==
Q'Wake is one of the Avatars led by the Mandarin.
