= Titus (comics) =

- Titus as depicted in Nova (vol. 5) #4 (May 2013). Art by Ed McGuinness (penciler), Dexter Vines (inker), Marte Garcia (colorist), and Albert Deschesne (letterer).

Publication information
- Publisher: Marvel Comics
- First appearance: Nova (vol. 5) #1 (February 2013)
- Created by: Jeph Loeb (writer); Ed McGuinness (artist)

In-story information
- Team affiliations: Nova Corps; Supernovas

Titus is a fictional character appearing in American comic books published by Marvel Comics.

== Publication history ==
Titus first appeared in Nova Vol. 5 #1 and was created by Jeph Loeb and Ed McGuinness.

== Fictional character biography ==
Titus is an alien resembling an anthropomorphic white tiger who is a former member of the Supernovas, a black ops branch of the Nova Corps. He served with Jesse Alexander, a fellow Supernova and the father of Sam Alexander. After Jesse leaves the Nova Corps, Titus is attacked by the Chitauri, loses his right eye and arm, and obtains cybernetic replacements.

Titus confronts Sam Alexander and falsely claims that he killed Jesse, who was actually captured by the Chitauri. When Titus finds Sam, he threatens not only him, but everything he holds dearly to him in exchange for the Ultimate Nullifier. Sam retrieves his helmet from Titus and takes them both into outer space, expecting the lack of oxygen to kill Titus. When this plan fails, Sam takes the Ultimate Nullifier and accidentally activates it, apparently killing Titus and a fleet of Chitauri.

== In other media ==
- Titus appears in Ultimate Spider-Man, voiced by JB Blanc.
- Titus appears in Guardians of the Galaxy, voiced again by JB Blanc. This version joined the Nova Corps to become involved in the intergalactic black market. Throughout his appearances, Titus battles the Guardians of the Galaxy before being arrested by the Nova Corps after Star-Lord exposes his motives. In the episode "Rock Your Baby", Titus escapes prison and attempts to convince Adam Warlock to destroy the Guardians, but Warlock traps Titus in the Soul Gem.
- Titus appears in Marvel: Avengers Alliance 2.
- Titus received a figure as part of Hasbro's Marvel Legends line.
