= Blood Brothers (comics) =

Marvel Comics fictional characters

The Blood Brothers
- The Blood Brothers as depicted in Iron Man #55 (February 1973). Art by Jim Starlin and Joe Sinnott.

Publication information
- Publisher: Marvel Comics
- First appearance: Iron Man #55 (February 1973)
- Created by: Jim Starlin

In-story information
- Species: Roclite
- Team affiliations: Lethal Legion
- Abilities: Superhuman strength and durability (increased when in proximity to one another); Vampiric need to drain blood

The Blood Brothers are a supervillain duo appearing in American comic books published by Marvel Comics.

Zoe Terakes and Shakira Barrera portray a version of the characters called the "Blood Siblings" in the Marvel Cinematic Universe Disney+ series Ironheart (2025).

== Publication history ==
The Blood Brothers first appeared in Iron Man #55 (Feb. 1973) and were created by Jim Starlin.

Following their debut, the Blood Brothers returned in Marvel Feature #12 (Nov. 1973), again fighting the superhero Iron Man, here teamed with Fantastic Four member The Thing. The Blood Brothers continued as Iron Man antagonists in Iron Man #88-89 (Aug.-Oct. 1976), then disappeared from publication for several years before resurfacing to battle the titular superhero team in The Avengers #252-253 (Feb.-March 1985). Following appearances in Quasar #12 (July 1990), and X-Men vol. 2, #107 (Dec. 2000), they aided Earth's superheroes against a common threat in the three-issue miniseries Maximum Security (Dec. 2000-Jan. 2001). They were next seen as interplanetary prison escapees on Earth in the four-issue miniseries Drax the Destroyer #1-4 (Nov. 2005-Feb. 2006), where one Blood Brother died.

== Fictional character biography ==
Gh'Ree and R'Hos Blood, the Blood Brothers, are twin ape-like aliens called Roclites originally in the service of Thanos, acting as the guardians of his first base on Earth. When Iron Man receives a mental signal sent by an imprisoned Drax the Destroyer, he becomes a target for the Blood Brothers, who ambush him and take him to Thanos' base where Drax is being held. When the two heroes overpower the brothers, Thanos detonates an explosion, forcing the heroes to flee and leave the Blood Brothers behind. When Thanos later obtains the Cosmic Cube, Iron Man returns to Thanos' base to search for him, and is taken by surprise by the Blood Brothers, who are still alive and remain loyal to Thanos. They attempt to kill Iron Man, but he and the Thing, who saw Iron Man's flight overhead and followed him to the base, overpower the Blood Brothers. With the henchmen defeated a second time, Thanos teleports the Blood Brothers to an unrevealed location.

They reappear years later in the service of the Controller, and battle Iron Man once more. Iron Man defeats them both with the aid of the hero Daredevil. Sometime later, the United States military discovers Thanos' old Earth base in Arizona and, after activating some of the machinery, accidentally teleports in the Blood Brothers. The two battle the Avengers and are eventually depowered by Eros.

The Blood Brothers are imprisoned, but are later released by Quasar and left on Mars. They later attempt to stop Rogue from rescuing a mutant Skrull. The brothers help Earth's heroes battle Ego the Living Planet, but are imprisoned with Paibok and Lunatik. The pair eventually escape and crash-land on Earth. They help enslave a small Alaskan town in an attempt to craft a space-worthy ship. This fails, due to the intervention of Drax the Destroyer, with one brother apparently being killed. The second brother survives and is later seen escaping the Raft.

The surviving Blood Brother later joins the Hood and his criminal empire, and helps fight the Skrulls during their invasion of Earth. When Jonas Harrow, one of the many members of the Hood's syndicate, develops a power drainer, the surviving Brother is part of a splinter group rebelling against Norman Osborn's power structure. This ends when Harrow is killed by the Hood.

In The Black Vortex, the Blood Brother is shown to be wasting away without his brother's life force to sustain him. J'son exposes him to the titular artifact, which transforms him into a more powerful form dubbed Brother Blood, and inducts him into his Slaughter Lords.

In Avengers: Standoff!, both Blood Brothers appear alive as inmates of Pleasant Hill, a gated community and prison established by S.H.I.E.L.D..

The Blood Brothers later appear as members of the Grandmaster's Lethal Legion, who compete against the Challenger's Black Order.

== Powers and abilities ==
The Blood Brothers possess superhuman physical abilities that are dependent on their proximity to one another. They can also drain blood in the manner of a vampire, though it is unclear whether they completely rely on blood for sustenance.

== In other media ==
=== Television ===
- The Blood Brothers appear in the Avengers Assemble episode "Hulked Out Heroes", voiced by David Kaye and Liam O'Brien. These versions are freelance thugs and former wrestlers who work for the Iron Skull.
- The Blood Brothers appear in Guardians of the Galaxy, both voiced by Kevin Michael Richardson. These versions can merge into a singular body at will and share any pain inflicted on them.
- Two humans loosely inspired by the Blood Brothers called the Blood Siblings appear in Ironheart, consisting of Jeri and Roz (portrayed by Zoe Terakes and Shakira Barrera, respectively). They are athletes who were banned from competitive sports and became street fighters. The Blood Siblings were later hired to work as enforcers for the Hood. Following Rampage's death, the Blood Siblings and their fellow gang members are fired by the Hood.

=== Video games ===
The Blood Brothers appear as bosses in Marvel's Guardians of the Galaxy, voiced by Kwasi Songul and Christian Jadah. These versions are Garek and Rosson Blood, bounty hunters and members of the Lethal Legion.
