= Kai Zen (actress) =

American actress (born 2012)

- Born: February 6, 2012 (age 14); Los Angeles, California, U.S.
- Occupation: Actress
- Years active: 2019–present

Kai Zen (born February 6, 2012) is an American actress known for portraying June in the 2020 Netflix film Feel the Beat, Pepper in Eureka!, and Phyla in Guardians of the Galaxy Vol. 3.

== Career ==
In 2017 she promoted children's clothing and consumer brands. In 2018 she appeared in a commercial for Xfinity. She made her screen debut with the American Housewife program. She then acted in the Netflix film titled Feel the Beat. In 2022 she joined the voice cast of Eureka!, a television series broadcast on Disney Junior, where she voices Pepper. In 2023, she played Phyla in the Marvel Cinematic Universe film Guardians of the Galaxy Vol. 3.

== Filmography ==
Key
†	Denotes works that have not yet been released

=== Film ===
Year	Title	Role	Notes
2019	The Lego Movie 2: The Second Part	Loop group	Voice
2020	Feel the Beat	June	
2022	Chip 'n Dale: Rescue Rangers	Kid in classroom	Voice
2023	Guardians of the Galaxy Vol. 3	Phyla	
2025	Fractured	Maya	
2025	In Your Dreams	Eight-Year-Old Stevie	Voice

=== Television ===
Year	Title	Role	Notes
2020	American Housewife	Supporting role	Season 4, episode 13
2020	The Rocketeer	River	Voice, 4 episodes
2020	Amphibia	Young Anne Boonchuy	Voice, episode: "Lost in Newtopia"
2021	South Park	Looper	Voice, episode: "South Park: Post Covid"
2022	Spidey and His Amazing Friends	Girl	Voice, episode: "An Egg-Cellent Adventure"
2022–2023	Kung Fu Panda: The Dragon Knight	Young Sir Luthera	Voice, 3 episodes
2022–2023	Eureka!	Pepper	Voice, main role
2024	Creature Commandos	Little Girl 2	Voice, episode: "Chasing Squirrels"
2025	Firebuds	Kaliani	Voice, recurring role
2025–present	Ariel	Akiko	Voice, main role (Season 2)
