= Nova (Sam Alexander) =

Marvel Comics superhero

- Textless cover of Nova vol. 6 #10 (August 2016). Art by Humberto Ramos and Edgar Delgado.

Publication information
- Publisher: Marvel Comics
- First appearance: Marvel Point One #1 (November 2011)
- Created by: Jeph Loeb; Ed McGuinness

In-story information
- Alter ego: Samuel "Sam" Alexander
- Place of origin: Earth-616
- Team affiliations: Nova Corps; New Warriors; New Avengers; Avengers; S.H.I.E.L.D. Young Avengers; Champions; Guardians of the Galaxy
- Partnerships: Richard Rider
- Abilities: Access to the Nova Force via helmet granting: Superhuman strength, speed, stamina, accuracy, agility, reflexes, and durability; Ability to breathe underwater and survive in space; Energy manipulation, generation, and projection; Regenerative healing factor; Electromagnetic energy generation; Force fields and shields; Solid energy constructs; Holographic illusions; Gravity manipulation; Hyperspace portals; Universal translation; Cosmic awareness; Enhanced intellect; Telekinesis; Flight

Nova (Sam Alexander) is a superhero appearing in American comic books published by Marvel Comics. The character, a space-faring member of the intergalactic police force known as the Nova Corps, was created in 2011 by writer Jeph Loeb and artist Ed McGuinness, based on the original Nova Richard Rider.

Logan Miller voices Sam in the animated series Ultimate Spider-Man, where he is depicted as a student of S.H.I.E.L.D. and a rival of Spider-Man. Miller reprised the role in later media, including the animated series Guardians of the Galaxy and the video game Marvel Heroes.

== Publication history ==
Sam Alexander first appeared in Marvel Point One #1 (November 2011), and was created by writer Jeph Loeb and artist Ed McGuinness. He first appeared in the Marvel Point One one-shot in November 2011 before starring in a solo series beginning in February 2013.

== Fictional character biography ==
Sam Alexander is a sixteen-year-old living in Carefree, Arizona, with his father Jesse, mother, and little sister. His father is always drunk and often talks about his supposed life as a Nova Centurion, and shirks his duties as a janitor at his son's school. When Sam comes home from school to find his father missing, he accidentally injures himself and wakes up in a hospital. There, Rocket Raccoon and Gamora reveal Sam's father really was in the Nova Corps. After putting on his father's helmet, Sam travels to the moon, meeting Uatu the Watcher, who reveals an invasion fleet of alien ships belonging to the Chitauri. Upon returning to Earth, Rocket Raccoon and Gamora train him and tell him to scout the fleet.

Sometime later, Sam is on a mission to warn planets in its path that Dark Phoenix is coming for them. He crashes on Earth, but is able to deliver the warning to the Avengers. After recovering, Nova joins the Avengers and the X-Men against Cyclops, who has become the new Dark Phoenix after Jean.

=== New Warriors ===
In "Infinity", Sam learns from his crush, Carrie, that she knows his secret identity. Shocked, he flies into the sky, but accidentally removes his helmet and is rendered comatose. He wakes up to Justice and Speedball, who recruit him into the New Warriors. He next faces off against Kaldera, an agent of Proxima Midnight, and defeats her in combat. Sam becomes cocky and prideful and begins to feel above the New Warriors and disregard his mother's rules. He gets into an argument with Carrie and gets mad at Justice and Speedball. Sam speaks to Uatu, who gives him advice, then returns to Earth to agree to his mother's rules and join the New Warriors. At the start of the "Original Sin" storyline, Sam trains with Uatu at the latter's base on the Moon. Uatu reveals that Jesse Alexander is alive and Sam leaves, happy with the information he just learned.

During "The Black Vortex" storyline, Sam takes possession of the eponymous artifact in an attempt to stop Thane, J'son, and the Slaughter Lords from obtaining it. After his sister Kaelynn and the Collector both attempt to take the Black Vortex, Sam leaves Earth to give the Vortex to the Guardians of the Galaxy. However, he is captured by Thane, who takes the Vortex for himself.

=== Champions ===
Nova briefly becomes a member of the Avengers alongside Spider-Man (Miles Morales) and Ms. Marvel (Kamala Khan). Following the "Civil War II" event, Nova, Spider-Man, and Ms. Marvel quit the Avengers and found a new incarnation of the Champions.

== Powers and abilities ==
Sam Alexander wears a helmet that gives him access to the Nova Force, which grants him superhuman strength and durability, flight, energy projection, telekinesis, force fields, universal translation, and the ability to breathe underwater and survive in space.

== Reception ==
=== Accolades ===
- In 2017, Den of Geek ranked Nova 2nd in their "Guardians of the Galaxy 3: 50 Marvel Characters We Want to See" list.
- In 2021, Screen Rant ranked Nova 3rd in their "10 Most Powerful Members Of The Champions" list.

== Literary reception ==
=== Volumes ===
==== Nova - 2013 ====
According to Diamond Comic Distributors, Nova #1 was the 14th best selling comic book in February 2013.

Tony Guerrero of Comic Vine gave Nova #1 a grade of 4 out of 5 stars, saying, "As a Richard Rider fan, I wasn't thrilled over the idea of a series starring a different Nova. Jeph Loeb does a good job in introducing who the character is and where he comes from. The version of Sam Alexander here is thankfully different than what is seen on the animated Ultimate Spider-Man series. As a first issue, we get the basics, we are introduced to Sam and get an idea how he becomes Nova. What we don't know is if the series will be based in space, on Earth or both. Ed McGuinness' art is great as he always manages to capture and depict big action scenes. We're off to a great start. I was hesitant about actually liking a Nova series with a different Nova but I have to admit I'm hooked so far." Benjamin Bailey of IGN gave Nova #1 a grade of 7.6 out of 10, writing, "If it's a fresh, new tale you are looking for, Nova probably isn't for you. You've read this comic before, no doubt. That said, if you just want a fun, classic-feeling adventure, then go ahead and give this series a shot. Sure, it copies countless other stories, but it copies them very well and with a bit of its own style and flair."

==== Nova - 2015 ====
According to Diamond Comic Distributors, Nova #1 was the 47th best selling comic book in November 2015.

Alexander Jones of ComicsBeat wrote, "Sean Ryan's depiction of Sam Alexander has compelled me to keep reading this series. I love that the book has a sentimental value owed to Jeph Loeb's son Sam, and I love that Marvel has such a young hero. The art direction actually fits better for this series than I first realized. Verdict: This is a strong first showing. I'm happy to read what's next."

==== Nova - 2016 ====
According to Diamond Comic Distributors, Nova #1 was the 30th best selling comic book in December 2016.

Tony Guerrero of Comic Vine gave Nova #1 a grade of 4 out of 5 stars, writing, "What could be better than a comic series with Nova? How about a comic series with two Novas? New and old fans can rejoice as the adventures of Sam Alexander continue alongside the return another character. Jeff Loveness and Ramon Perez are giving the two characters clear and distinct voices. The art and color creates a good atmosphere and tone for the characters. With the questions raised here, there's definitely plenty of reasons to come back for more."

== In other media ==
=== Television ===
- Sam Alexander / Nova appears in Ultimate Spider-Man, voiced by Logan Miller. This version is an orphan and the last of the Nova Corps after former member Titus killed them to claim their helmets. Subsequently, he was taken in by the Guardians of the Galaxy and trained by Rocket Raccoon before becoming a S.H.I.E.L.D. trainee on Earth. Throughout the first two seasons, Alexander serves as a rival to fellow trainee Spider-Man. In the third season, he becomes Nova Prime while fighting Titus and the Chitauri. In the fourth season, Alexander leaves the team to help Nick Fury protect Madame Web before returning in the series finale "Graduation Day" for the eponymous ceremony.
- Sam Alexander / Nova appears in Marvel Disk Wars: The Avengers, voiced by Hisayoshi Suganuma in the Japanese version and by Sam Riegel in the English version.
- Sam Alexander / Nova appears in Guardians of the Galaxy, voiced again by Logan Miller. This version learned of the Nova Corps from his father, Jesse Alexander, before the latter disappeared while trying to capture Thanos. Following this, Sam obtains a Nova Corps helmet after it mysteriously appears in his home and spends years searching for Jesse before eventually reuniting with him on Titan.

=== Video games ===
- Sam Alexander / Nova appears as playable character in Marvel Strike Force.
- Sam Alexander / Nova appears as a playable character in Marvel Super Hero Squad Online.
- The Ultimate Spider-Man incarnation of Sam Alexander / Nova appears as a downloadable alternative costume for Richard Rider / Nova in Ultimate Marvel vs. Capcom 3.
- Sam Alexander / Nova's outfit appears in LittleBigPlanet via the "Marvel Costume Kit 5" DLC.
- Sam Alexander / Nova appears as a playable character in Marvel Heroes, voiced again by Logan Miller.
- Sam Alexander / Nova appears as a playable character in Lego Marvel Super Heroes.
- Sam Alexander / Nova appears in Disney Infinity 2.0, as part of the Spider-Man Playset Pack, and Disney Infinity 3.0.
- Sam Alexander / Nova appears as a playable character in Marvel Avengers Alliance.
- Sam Alexander / Nova appears as a playable character in Marvel Puzzle Quest.
- Sam Alexander / Nova appears as a playable character in Lego Marvel's Avengers.
- Sam Alexander / Nova appears as a playable character in Marvel: Future Fight.
- Sam Alexander / Nova appears as a playable character in Lego Marvel Super Heroes 2 via the Champions DLC.

=== Merchandise ===
- Sam Alexander / Nova, based on the Ultimate Spider-Man incarnation, appears in the Lego Super Heroes set.
- Sam Alexander / Nova appears in the Ultimate Spider-Man 6-inch toyline.
- Sam Alexander / Nova appears in Hasbro's Marvel Legends toyline.

=== Books ===
Nova appears in the children's book Spider-Man: Attack of the Heroes.

== Collected editions ==
- Nova Vol. 1: Origin (collects Nova Vol 5 #1-5, Point One #1 (Nova story), Marvel Now! Point One #1 (Nova story)) September 2013, ISBN 9780785166054
- Nova Vol. 2: Rookie Season (collects Nova Vol 5 #6-9, #10 (A story)) March 2014, ISBN 9780785168393
- Nova Vol. 3: Nova Corpse (collects Nova Vol 5 #10 (B story), #11-16) June 2014, ISBN 9780785189572
- Nova Vol. 4: Original Sin (collects Nova Vol 5 #17-22) January 2015, ISBN 9780785189589
- Nova Vol. 5: Axis (collects Nova Vol 5 #23-27) April 2015, ISBN 9780785192411
- Nova Vol. 6: Homecoming (collects Nova Vol 5 #28-31, Annual #1) November 2015, ISBN 9780785193753
- Nova The Human Rocket Vol. 1: Burn Out (collects Nova Vol 6 #1-6) June 2016, ISBN 9780785196501
- Nova The Human Rocket Vol. 2: Afterburn (collects Nova Vol 6 #7-11) January 2017, ISBN 9780785196518
- Nova: Resurrection (collects Nova Vol 7 #1-7) August 2017, ISBN 9781302905293
