= Phyla-Vell =

Marvel Comics superhero

- Phyla-Vell as Martyr. Art by Paul Renaud.

Publication information
- Publisher: Marvel Comics
- First appearance: Captain Marvel vol. 5 #16 (November 2003)
- Created by: Peter David (writer); Paul Azaceta (artist)

In-story information
- Full name: Phyla-Vell
- Species: Titanian/Kree Hybrid
- Team affiliations: Guardians of the Galaxy; United Front
- Notable aliases: Quasar; Captain Marvel; Martyr
- Abilities: Superhuman strength, durability, speed, agility, and reflexes; Energy absorption and projection; Cosmic awareness; Flight

Phyla-Vell is a character appearing in American comic books published by Marvel Comics. Created by Peter David and Paul Azaceta, the character first appeared in Captain Marvel vol. 5 #16 (November 2003). Phyla-Vell is the daughter of superhero Mar-Vell and the sister of Genis-Vell. The character has also been known as Quasar, Captain Marvel, and Martyr at various points in her history.

A reimagined version of the character appears in the Marvel Cinematic Universe film Guardians of the Galaxy Vol. 3, portrayed by Kai Zen.

== Publication history ==
Phyla-Vell first appeared in Captain Marvel vol. 5 #16 and was created by writer Peter David and artist Paul Azaceta. She is introduced as Phyla-Vell and is the daughter of Elysius, the genetically engineered woman beloved by the late Mar-Vell. When Genis-Vell went mad and destroyed and recreated the world, he created a new universe where everything was mostly the same but for some subtle differences. She was the second child created by Elysius, who also created Genis-Vell, and for a time, Phyla wore the name Captain Marvel.

The character appeared as Quasar after the previous Quasar died, in Annihilation: Conquest, featuring in her own, self-titled mini-series written by Christos Gage. Leading on from this appearance she was part of the line-up for the 2008 Guardians of the Galaxy team.

She made a deal to save the life of her partner Moondragon; in exchange she became the Avatar of Oblivion, and she started calling herself Martyr. She remained part of the Guardians of the Galaxy team until her death.

Phyla-Vell and Genis-Vell's names are derived from phylum and genus, two of the levels of organization (taxa) for classifying life.

== Fictional character biography ==
Phyla-Vell as Captain Marvel. Captain Marvel #16 (Nov. 2003). Art by Paul Azaceta.

After Genis-Vell, then known as Captain Marvel, previously destroyed and recreated the universe, the "new" version was subtly altered with Phyla-Vell's existence being one of the changes. It is revealed that she is the second artificially created offspring of Mar-Vell who was created by her mother Elysius in the "new" universe because her first attempt (Genis-Vell) had been so successful. Initially, her origin conflicted with previously established storylines, but this is resolved in Captain Marvel vol. 5 #18 (Feb. 2004).

She fights her brother Genis-Vell, who was insane at the time, in the process helping to restore his sanity. She then tries to lay claim to the "Captain Marvel" title, though her brother refuses to give it up. Phyla is next seen at the trial of Starfox.

The Captain Marvel (vol. 5) series heavily hinted that Phyla-Vell is a lesbian, and in #25 (September 2004) the character admits that she is attracted to Moondragon and invites her on a tour of the "spiral nebula near Renault VII". Before Moondragon can accept, the two wander through a portal.

=== Annihilation ===
Phyla later appeared during Annihilation, where she had been visiting her father's grave with Moondragon when the pair were attacked by Thanos who ripped off Moondragon's ear and gave it to Phyla, telling her to go to Drax the Destroyer and how his actions would determine Moondragon's fate shortly before teleporting away with Moondragon. Drax refused to stop his pursuit of Thanos.

Phyla then goes with Nova and Star-Lord to lead a final battle against Annihilus, being saved at the last second by a massive energy wave caused by the just freed Galactus, which left only the three heroes and Annihilus as survivors. During the battle, Phyla manages to steal the quantum bands that Annihilus took from Quasar, weakening him and allowing Nova to finally bring an end to the Annihilation Wave. She is then seen re-united with Moondragon, and decides it's up to her to become the new Quasar.

=== Annihilation: Conquest – Quasar ===
Phyla had her own mini-series as the new Quasar, stating July through October 2007, called Annihilation: Conquest – Quasar. The series was written by Christos Gage and penciled by Mike Lilly. Phyla is finding it hard to follow the footsteps of the former Quasar and also to follow in the Vell family's footsteps. Phylla and her lover Moondragon follow a voice to find the saviour for the Kree race, who is attacked by the Phalanx. In the end it turns out 'the voice' is the Supreme Intelligence of the Kree; thanks to the Supreme Intelligence they find a cocoon, in which Adam Warlock is restoring. The cocoon breaks open and Phyla and Moondragon ask Warlock to help them fight against the Phalanx. This story was continued in the main mini-series Annihilation: Conquest.

=== Guardians of the Galaxy ===
Following the Phalanx invasion, she joins the new Guardians of the Galaxy. However, Phyla, like much of the team, quits after discovering Peter Quill had Mantis mentally nudge them into joining. While helping Drax search for Cammi, an Earth girl who he had taken into space before the Annihilation War, they consult a psychic to get a lead on Cammi's whereabouts only to be informed that Moondragon was trying to contact them. They attempt to consult Mentor, who apparently kills them. Mentor sends Phyla and Drax to Oblivion where they encounter Maelstrom and the Dragon of the Moon. After losing the Quantum Bands to Maelstrom Phyla is offered as a sacrifice to the Dragon so that Maelstrom can be in its good graces. While inside the dragon she apparently makes a deal in exchange for Heather Douglas. The dragon then releases them, with Phyla wearing a new red and black costume adorned with skulls and wielding a new sword, and they return to the world of the living where Phyla refuses to elaborate on the deal that she made with the Dragon. It is later learned from Maelstrom that she agreed to become the new avatar of Oblivion.

=== Martyr ===
Now calling herself Martyr, Phyla-Vell is a more abrasive and aggressive figure. When the Guardians attempted to negotiate with the Inhumans to stop the War of Kings, she ruined the attempt by taking Crystal hostage instead; this led to battle between the Inhumans and Guardians, while she continued to escalate. Eventually, the Inhumans try to end the war by detonating a weapon that shatters space itself, creating a multiversal Fault.

When Adam Warlock stops the Fault's growth by using a redundant timeline, one where he became the villainous Magus, Phyla-Vell reveals that her deal with Oblivion was to kill "the Avatar of Life" and she'd know what to do when the time came. Knowing he would now become Magus, she ran Adam through but this failed to stop his transformation. Several of the Guardians, then stranded in the year 3009, were then sent back in time to stop Magus' creation and Phyla is prevented from making her move. This time when Warlock transforms, she engages him in combat - but Magus magically teleports her own sword from her hands and kills her with it.

Phyla is later revealed to still be alive, but trapped in suspended animation by Magus. She escapes and frees the other Guardians, but is tricked into freeing Thanos, who kills her.

== Powers and abilities ==
Phyla-Vell has superhuman strength, speed, agility, durability, and reflexes. She can fire energy blasts and fly. She also acts like an "energy sponge," absorbing any energy attacks directed at her and returning them as energy blasts. She has cosmic awareness and is a proficient fighter.

She then came into possession of the quantum bands formerly owned by Wendell Vaughn. The Bands grant vast energy manipulation powers, such as absorbing and transforming energy on a stellar level, forming solid energy constructs and forcefields, allowing for space travel and providing protection from telepathic attacks.

While searching for Heather Douglas, Phyla lost the Quantum Bands to the villain Maelstrom. She has gained unknown new powers by becoming the new avatar of Oblivion. However, Wendell has stated that her Quantum Sword will still draw power from the Quantum Bands and that they will always be a part of her.

== Reception ==
=== Critical response ===
Deirdre Kaye of Scary Mommy called Phyla-Vell a "role model" and "truly heroic." Jamie Lovett of ComicBook.com included Phyla-Vell in their "5 Awesome Guardians Of The Galaxy Who Aren't In The Marvel Cinematic Universe " list. Joe Garza of SlashFilm included Phyla-Vell in their "10 Guardians Of The Galaxy Comic Characters We Want To See In The MCU" list. Blair Marnell of IGN included Phyla-Vell in their "7 Characters Who Should Join Guardians of the Galaxy Vol. 3" list. Screen Rant included Phyla-Vell in their "15 Most Powerful Versions Of Captain Marvel From The Comics" list, in their "10 Best Members Of The Guardians Of The Galaxy Still Missing From The MCU" list, and in their "12 Characters We Want To See In 'Guardians of the Galaxy' Sequels" list, and ranked her 6th in their "10 LGBTQA Characters Who Should Be Introduced To The MCU" list, and 8th in their "15 Most Powerful Guardians Of The Galaxy Members In The Comics" list.

Autostraddle ranked Phyla-Vell 2nd in their "11 Female Superheroes I Wish Marvel Would Make Movies About" list, and 6th in their "7 LGBT Women Who Need to Appear in the MCU Immediately" list. CBR.com ranked Phyla-Vell 4th in their "25 Most Powerful Guardians Of The Galaxy" list, 5th in their "The Kree: The 10 Most Powerful Members Of The Race" list, 6th in their "All The Captain Marvels" list, 7th in their "Marvel's 20 Most Powerful Cosmic Heroes" list, 8th in their "20 Powerful Female Marvel Characters We Hope To See In The MCU's Phase Four" list, 9th in their "Every Captain Marvel Ever" list. and 13th in their "25 Fastest Characters In The Marvel Universe" list. Marc Buxton of Den of Geek ranked Phyla-Vell 15th in their "Guardians of the Galaxy 3: 50 Marvel Characters We Want to See" list.

== Other versions ==
An alternate universe version of Phyla-Vell from an unidentified universe makes a minor appearance in Infinity Countdown #4. When the cosmic entity Devondra destroys this universe, Phyla-Vell and her universe's Moondragon, to whom she is married, escape into the regular Marvel Universe. They eventually join the Guardians of the Galaxy, though Phyla has a hard time adjusting to the new universe, comparing it unfavorably to her own. Her dislike increases when Moondragon merges with her Earth-616 counterpart, straining their marriage.

== In other media ==
=== Television ===
- Phyla-Vell / Quasar appears in The Avengers: Earth's Mightiest Heroes episode "Michael Korvac", voiced by Moira Quirk. This version is a member of the Guardians of the Galaxy.
- Phyla-Vell appears in Guardians of the Galaxy, voiced by Ming-Na Wen. This version is a Kree Accuser.

=== Film ===
A younger character loosely based on Phyla-Vell simply called Phylla appears in Guardians of the Galaxy Vol. 3, portrayed by Kai Zen. She is a "Star Child" genetically engineered by the High Evolutionary before she and his other experiments are freed by the Guardians of the Galaxy, which she later joins.

=== Video games ===
- Phyla-Vell appears as a playable character in Marvel Avengers Alliance.
- Phyla-Vell / Quasar appears as a non-playable character in Disney Infinity 2.0.
- Phyla-Vell appears as a playable character in Marvel: Future Fight.
- Phyla-Vell / Quasar appears as a non-playable character in Disney Infinity 3.0.
- Phyla-Vell appears as a playable character in Marvel Strike Force.
- Phyla-Vell / Quasar appears as a playable character in Marvel Cosmic Invasion, voiced by Aileen Mythen.

== Collected editions ==
Title	Material collected	Published date	ISBN
Annihilation: Conquest - Quasar	Annihilation: Conquest - Quasar #1-4	January 2008	978-0785127185
