= Chitauri =

Fictional alien race in Marvel comic books

Publication information
- Publisher: Marvel Comics
- First appearance: The Ultimates #8 (November 2002)
- Created by: Mark Millar; Bryan Hitch

Characteristics
- Notable members: See Known Chitauri
- Inherent abilities: Ultimate Marvel version: Shapeshifting

The Chitauri (/tʃɪˈtaʊri/) are a fictional race of extraterrestrial shapeshifters appearing in American comic books published by Marvel Comics, specifically in the Ultimate Marvel universe (Earth-1610). They were created by Mark Millar and Bryan Hitch in place of the Skrulls, who play a similar role in the mainstream continuity of Earth-616. The species first appeared in Ultimates #8 (November 2002).

The species was also adapted to other media, most notably for films set in the Marvel Cinematic Universe (MCU). The MCU incarnation of the species inspired the version that appeared in Earth-616 continuity beginning with the series Nova (2013).

== Fictional species biography ==
=== Earth-1610 ===
The race called Chitauri appeared as a counterpart to the Skrulls. They are a shapeshifting alien species who have attempted to conquer Earth, most notably during World War II and again in the early 21st century.

The Chitauri claim to be part of "the immune system of the universe", wiping out disorder and free will wherever they find it. They seem to prefer to act behind the scenes, mimicking and influencing the social and military methods of the species they are currently infiltrating. For example, they aided the Nazis in their attempt at world conquest by providing them with the technology to create a nuclear bomb carried by an intercontinental ballistic missile. However, this attempt was thwarted by Captain America. Through the entire conflict of World War II, the Chitauri are driven out of their operations in Africa and Europe.

The Chitauri's next attempt at conquest is initially more subtle, involving long-term methods of manipulation such as will-inhibiting drugs in many nations' water supplies, influencing the media, and R.F.I.D. (radio-frequency identification) microchips to be implanted in schoolchildren, among other means. The Chitauri also infiltrate S.H.I.E.L.D., particularly the Psi-Division which could telepathically ferret out Chitauri agents. However, S.H.I.E.L.D. manages to detect some of the low-ranking "drone" staff of the aliens, disguised as common office workers, and wipe them out.

The Chitauri leader (known only by his former Nazi identity Herr Kleiser) takes Wasp to a hidden Chitauri base in Arizona. However, their location is given away when a fleet of damaged Chitauri starships enter Earth's atmosphere, claiming that they were fleeing major defeats across the galaxy by their intergalactic enemies and that the remainder of their forces are forced to the Solar System. Disregarding Kleiser's efforts, the Chitauri order him to destroy Earth and the Solar System with a doomsday bomb as part of a scorched earth policy and retreat to the "lower fourth-dimension". The Ultimates and all available S.H.I.E.L.D. and military forces immediately converge on the alien fleet.

At the same time, Captain America battled Kleiser, but is unable to defeat him alone. At Captain America's urging/mocking of Kleiser touching Betty Ross, the Hulk kills and eats Kleiser.

=== Earth-616 ===
A new iteration of the Chitauri, inspired by their portrayal in the Marvel Cinematic Universe, were introduced into the mainstream Earth-616 continuity, debuting in Nova (2013). Most of the Chitauri are depicted as simple-minded creatures similar to insects.

== Powers and abilities ==
The Chitauri of Earth-1610 are able to mimic human form and absorb human knowledge by sucking the organs or brains out of the humans they imitate. The Chitauri of Earth-616 lack shapeshifting abilities.

== Known Chitauri ==
=== Earth-1610 ===
- Califa – A member of the Chitauri armada which were fighting the Kree.
- Gunther – A sleeper agent who infiltrated into S.H.I.E.L.D.
- Herr Kleiser – A Chitauri who infiltrated Earth during World War II and worked with the Nazi Party. He was killed and later eaten by the Hulk.
- Kalxor – A member of the Chitauri armada which were fighting the Kree. His parents were killed by the Kree.
- Rester – The commander of the Chitauri armada which were fighting the Kree.
- Siegfred – A sleeper agent who infiltrated S.H.I.E.L.D.
- Wigbert – A sleeper agent who infiltrated S.H.I.E.L.D.

=== Earth-616 ===
- Peacebringer - A Chitauri ambassador who was in league with Profiteer.
- Warbringer – A Chitauri warlord who was kept in hibernation due to his brutal methods. He would go on to fight Nova, the Avengers, Guardians of the Galaxy, and the Champions.

== Inspiration ==
Millar's conception of the Chitauri was inspired by British conspiracy theorist David Icke. In his interview with Credo Mutwa, Icke learned of the Chitauri and believes the world is secretly run by an elite called the Illuminati who are in reality shapeshifting reptilian humanoids. The term Chitauri to describe these humanoids was taken from Icke's The Reptilian Agenda, where Zulu Shaman and historian Credo Mutwa and David Icke reveal the story of the Chitauri (reptilian) takeover of planet Earth and how a shapeshifting Chitauri (“Talker”) race has controlled planet Earth for thousands of years. Essentially, the term Chitauri is the Shona term meaning "talker" in reference to the reptilians, as shown above in the two different meanings referenced in parentheses.

== Comparison with Skrulls ==
Another race called Skrulls, physically resembling the Skrulls of the mainstream Marvel universe, appear later (led by Skrull emperor Kl'rt); these Skrulls dislike being confused with the Chitauri, whom they call terrorists. They have extremely advanced technology, but have not been observed to shapeshift. These Skrulls were seen only in an alternate timeline in which Reed Richards contacted their world via his teleporter. The events leading to that timeline were altered in Ultimate Fantastic Four #29, and contact was never made.

== In other media ==
=== Television ===
- The Chitauri appear in Ultimate Spider-Man. This version of the species is led by Korvac and resemble their MCU portrayals (see below).
- The Chitauri appear in the Avengers Assemble episode "Avengers: Impossible".
- The Chitauri appear in Lego Marvel Super Heroes: Maximum Overload, with vocal effects provided by Dee Bradley Baker.
- The Chitauri appear in the Guardians of the Galaxy (2015) episode "The Backstabbers", with several serving Nebula.

=== Film ===
The Chitauri appear in Ultimate Avengers and Ultimate Avengers 2. This version of the species are reptilian creatures who can generate fire blasts from their hands and largely lack shapeshifting abilities, with the exception of their leader Herr Kleiser (voiced by Jim Ward).

=== Marvel Cinematic Universe ===
The Chitauri appear in media set in the Marvel Cinematic Universe (MCU). This version of the species are grey reptilian humanoids with bio-mechanical physiology who lack shapeshifting abilities and are allied with Thanos through his vizier, a hooded being called the Other.

- The Chitauri first appear in The Avengers, where the Other, acting on Thanos' behalf, lends the Chitauri to Loki to invade Earth. While they eventually overwhelm the Avengers, Iron Man destroys the mothership with a hijacked nuclear missile, killing the invading forces.
- In Agents of S.H.I.E.L.D., Hydra salvages Chitauri metal and utilizes it in several of their devices throughout the first season. In the pilot episode, the Chitauri appear via archive footage. Additionally, S.H.I.E.L.D. agent Grant Ward recovers a Chitauri neural link from an illegal arms dealer. In the episode "FZZT", it is revealed that several firefighters were sent to New York following the events of The Avengers, with a group from Wrigley, Pennsylvania recovering a Chitauri helmet containing a rust-like alien virus that slowly kills anyone exposed to it. During the subsequent S.H.I.E.L.D. investigation, Leo Fitz and Jemma Simmons recover the helmet and create a serum to counteract the virus.
- The Other and a Chitauri soldier appear in Guardians of the Galaxy (2014). The latter appears as a prisoner of the Collector while the former attends a meeting between Thanos and Ronan the Accuser, during which Ronan kills the Other for berating him.
- Chitauri technology appears in Avengers: Age of Ultron. A Hydra faction led by Baron Strucker study it until the Avengers discover his hidden lab. When Iron Man recovers Loki's scepter, Wanda Maximoff causes him to hallucinate the Chitauri's return, which eventually leads him to create Ultron.
- In Luke Cage, Hammer Industries use salvaged Chitauri metal to create ammunition known as Judas bullets, which can pierce Luke Cage's bulletproof skin. Willis Stryker works with Mariah Dillard to manipulate the NYPD into arming the Emergency Service Unit with mass-produced Judas bullets.
- Chitauri technology appears in Spider-Man: Homecoming. When Damage Control begins salvaging leftover technology from the Chitauri's original invasion, Adrian Toomes and his cohorts steal the technology to build and sell powerful weapons until they are eventually foiled by Spider-Man.
- The Chitauri appear in Avengers: Infinity War, primarily serving as Thanos' enforcers in his mission to obtain the Infinity Stones. In a flashback, they invaded Gamora's home planet and slaughtered half of its populace on Thanos' orders.
- Past versions of the Chitauri appear in Avengers: Endgame. They arrive in the present to help Thanos destroy the Earth in retaliation for the Avengers undoing his victory in Infinity War, but Iron Man uses the Infinity Stones to disintegrate Thanos and his forces.

=== Video games ===
- The MCU version of the Chitauri appear as enemies in Lego Marvel's Avengers.
- The Chitauri appear in Marvel Avengers Academy.
- The Chitauri appear in Fortnite Battle Royale as part of the Avengers: Endgame tie-in event.
- The Chitauri appear in Marvel's Guardians of the Galaxy.

=== Miscellaneous ===
The MCU version of the Chitauri appear in Marvel Universe Live!.

Preceded by Red Skull	Marvel Cinematic Universe film villain (with Loki); 2012	Succeeded by Aldrich Killian
