= Guardians of the Galaxy (TV series) =

American superhero animated television series

- Promotional poster
- Also known as: Guardians of the Galaxy: Mission Breakout! (season 3)
- Genre: Science fiction comedy; Space western; Superhero
- Based on: Guardians of the Galaxy by: Dan Abnett; Andy Lanning
- Developed by: Marty Isenberg
- Starring: Will Friedle; Trevor Devall; Vanessa Marshall; Kevin Michael Richardson; David Sobolov
- Composer: Michael Tavera
- Country of origin: United States
- Original language: English
- No. of seasons: 3
- No. of episodes: 79 (list of episodes)

Production
- Executive producers: Alan Fine; Dan Buckley; Joe Quesada; Jeph Loeb; Cort Lane; Eric Radomski
- Running time: 22 minutes
- Production company: Marvel Animation

Original release
- Network: Disney XD
- Release: September 5, 2015 – June 9, 2019

Related
- Avengers Assemble; Ultimate Spider-Man; Hulk and the Agents of S.M.A.S.H.; Marvel's Spider-Man

Marvel's Guardians of the Galaxy, known as Marvel's Guardians of the Galaxy: Mission Breakout for the final season, is an American animated television series based on the Marvel Comics superhero team of the same name. It is produced by Marvel Animation. The series premiered on September 5, 2015, on Disney XD.

Marvel's Guardians of the Galaxy features the same main characters as the film of the same name, although it is not a part of the Marvel Cinematic Universe. Seth Green was the only actor from the film to return, reprising his voice role as Howard the Duck.

The third and final season premiered in March 2018, and ended on June 9, 2019.

== Plot ==
=== Season 1 ===
The Guardians of the Galaxy team consists of Star-Lord, Gamora, Drax the Destroyer, Rocket Raccoon, and Groot. During season one, the Guardians obtain an artifact called the Spartaxian CryptoCube that is tied to the Spartax species. The Cube contains a map leading to the Cosmic Seed, a powerful weapon capable of creating a new universe. The Guardians must find and destroy the Cosmic Seed before it can be weaponized for evil.

=== Season 2 ===
Season two starts with the Guardians teaming up with the Avengers to fight the High Evolutionary.

Following Thanos's defeat, the Guardians get their hands on a sarcophagus that was found on Thanos's asteroid base and stolen by Yondu. This sarcophagus later hatches into Adam Warlock, who the Guardians convince to follow his own destiny.

Star-Lord's father J'son, the king of the Spartax and the leader of the Universal Believers, escapes prison and uses Nova Corps helmets to control Adam and transform him into the Magus. The Guardians break J'son out of Magus, restoring him to normal.

=== Season 3: Mission Breakout ===
In the third season, the Guardians go on the run after being framed by the Collector. Phyla-Vell works with the Guardians to save the Kree homeworld of Hala and defeat the Collector, who escapes after setting his ship to self-destruct.

After traversing through the Black Vortex, the Guardians discover that the Asgardians' old enemies the Darkhawks have been replacing Nova Prime and members of the Galactic Council. The Darkhawks are made by Serpent, who plans to reclaim Asgard. Using the Dragonfang sword, the Guardians defeat Serpent and save the galaxy.

Season three included Marvel characters Spider-Man, Max Modell, Venom, and Carnage in a crossover with the television series Spider-Man, and had Stan Lee in a guest role.

== Episodes ==
Season	Episodes	Originally released	
Season	Episodes	First released	Last released
Shorts	5	August 1, 2015	August 29, 2015
1	26	September 5, 2015	December 17, 2016
Shorts	6	February 27, 2017	March 4, 2017
2	26	March 11, 2017	December 3, 2017
3	26	March 18, 2018	June 9, 2019

== Cast ==
=== Main ===
- Will Friedle – Peter Quill / Star-Lord
- Trevor Devall – Rocket Raccoon, Ranger, Black Bolt, Fandral
- Vanessa Marshall – Gamora, Meredith Quill (season 1), Crystal, Halfworld Robots
- Kevin Michael Richardson – Groot, Wal Rus, Mandala, Supreme Intelligence, Heimdall, Blood Brothers
- David Sobolov – Drax the Destroyer, Blackjack O'Hare

=== Additional voices ===
- Jonathan Adams – Ronan the Accuser
- Charlie Adler – MODOK
- Pamela Adlon – Ma Raccoon, Sis Raccoon
- Diedrich Bader – Maximus
- Troy Baker – Loki, Hawkeye, Hermod
- Eric Bauza – Adam Warlock, Prince Shokk
- Jeff Bennett – Rhomann Dey, Wraith, Principal Philbin
- JB Blanc – Titus
- Jesse Burch – Black Dwarf, Bruce Banner (season 2), Moragan
- Robbie Daymond – Spider-Man
- Jessica DiCicco – Tana Nile
- John DiMaggio – Lunatik
- Robin Atkin Downes – Serpent
- Eric Edelstein – Sheriff Michael Coogan
- Dave Fennoy – Korath the Pursuer
- Jonathan Frakes – J'son
- Nika Futterman – Angela
- Morla Gorrondona – Xeron
- Brian George – Pyko
- Grant George – Ant-Man (season 2)
- Seth Green – Howard the Duck
- Grey Griffin – Captain Marvel
- Jennifer Hale – Mantis
- David Kaye – Corvus Glaive
- Josh Keaton – Ant-Man (season 3)
- Tom Kenny – Collector
- Logan Miller – Sam Alexander / Nova
- Melanie Minichino – Eva Alexander
- Nolan North – Gorgon, High Evolutionary, Jesse Alexander
- Toks Olagundoye – Ja Kyee Lrurt
- Khary Payton – Jukka
- Stephen Root – Neeza
- Marion Ross – Doctor Minerva
- Della Saba – Kaelynn Alexander
- Kevin Shinick – Bruce Banner (season 3)
- Isaac C. Singleton Jr. – Thanos
- Roger Craig Smith – Captain America, Diviek
- Jason Spisak – Grandmaster
- Tara Strong – Irani Rael, Lucy, Rora, young Adam Warlock
- Cree Summer – Nebula, Meredith Quill (shorts), Captain Victoria
- Raven-Symoné – Valkyrie
- Catherine Taber – Medusa
- Fred Tatasciore – Hulk, Max Modell, Prince Trow-Mah, Gronk
- James Arnold Taylor – Yondu, Cosmo the Spacedog, Svel Smard, J'Que, Darkhawk
- James Urbaniak – Ebony Maw
- Oliver Vaquer – Karnak
- Kari Wahlgren – Proxima Midnight, Hela
- Hynden Walch – Supergiant
- Talon Warburton – Champion of the Universe
- Audrey Wasilewski – Black Vortex
- Frank Welker – Odin
- Ming-Na Wen – Phyla-Vell
- Wil Wheaton – Michael Korvac
- Travis Willingham – Thor, Hogun, General Glogug
- Mick Wingert – Iron Man
- Henry Winkler – Grandpa Quill
- Dave Wittenberg – Ichthyo Pike

== Crew ==
- Leo Riley – Supervising director
- Lisa Schaffer – Casting and voice director

== Production ==
Marvel was rumored to be considering a new animated series with another Spider-Man show or a Guardians of the Galaxy show. The appearances of the Guardians of the Galaxy in Avengers Assemble and Ultimate Spider-Man were supposed to be test runs for their own show. Screen Rant indicated in January 2014 that the Guardians of the Galaxy series was selected for development.

On July 26, 2014, at San Diego Comic-Con, a week before the release of the Guardians of the Galaxy film, Marvel Animation announced the Guardians of the Galaxy animated TV series with a trailer featuring Rocket Raccoon and Star-Lord. With the success of the live-action film, Marvel and Disney XD announced that they were moving forward with the animated series at New York Comic Con. They showed some test footage to the audience. The series was announced to air in 2015 as a part of the Marvel Universe on Disney XD.

Advanced previews of the show started airing on Disney XD on August 1, 2015. A full preview of the series aired on Disney XD on September 5, 2015. The official one-hour premiere aired on September 26, 2015.

Each episode is named after or a reference to a popular song from the 1960s, 1970s, or 1980s.

At New York Comic Con 2015, it was announced the series had been renewed for a second season, which premiered on Disney XD on March 11, 2017.

== Music ==
In late August, it was revealed that licensed songs from the 1970s would be used to augment the tone and soundtrack of the series.

In September, Marvel's Guardians of the Galaxy: Cosmic Mix Vol. 1 (Music from the Animated Television Series) was announced. It is a collection of 12 songs featured in the show's first season.

No.	Title	Artist(s)	Length
1.	"Hooked On A Feeling"	Blue Swede	2:53
2.	"Rocky Mountain Way"	Joe Walsh	5:16
3.	"Don't Stop Me Now"	Queen	3:30
4.	"Drift Away"	Dobie Gray	3:57
5.	"So You Are A Star"	The Hudson Brothers	3:48
6.	"The Boys Are Back In Town"	Thin Lizzy	4:28
7.	"Walk Away"	James Gang	3:34
8.	"Funk #49"	James Gang	3:56
9.	"Shake Your Groove Thing"	Peaches & Herb	5:33
10.	"I Will Survive"	Gloria Gaynor	8:01
11.	"Funk Funk"	Cameo	4:47
12.	"Joy To The World"	Three Dog Night	3:39
Total length:			50:42

== Broadcast ==
Guardians of the Galaxy aired as a preview on Disney XD in the United States and Disney Channel in Canada on September 5, 2015. It officially debuted on September 26, 2015. The series premiered on Disney XD in the United Kingdom and Ireland on November 7, 2015. It also premiered on Disney XD in Australia and New Zealand on November 8, 2015. In India, from March 8, 2019, it is being aired on Marvel HQ, an Indian version of Disney XD.

== Reception ==
=== Critical response ===
The review aggregator website Rotten Tomatoes reports an 86% approval rating with an average rating of 7.00/10, based on 7 reviews for the first season.

Blair Marnell of Nerdist called "Road to Knowhere" a "pretty solid introduction to the Guardians of the Galaxy animated series," saying, "Of course, there's always room for improvement. If Guardians of the Galaxy is really going to be a standalone franchise, then it needs this animated series to keep going all the way up to the next movie in 2017. This show might be good enough to do that." David Griffin of Screen Rant stated that the premiere of the show delivers an "exhilarating action-packed adventure," asserting, "Now we just have to see if the exciting action and engaging storylines can stay strong throughout the entire season." Kevin Johnson of The A.V. Club gave "Knowhere to Run" a B+ ranking and "Road to Knowhere" a B− ranking, writing, "Disney XD has a very specific demographic they're aiming for, which leaves "Road to Knowhere/Knowhere to Run" somewhat clunky and awkward, but brimming with potential and leaves you eager for more. The two-part pilot is simultaneously complicated and simplistic, struggling to give the story and its characters due weight while forcing some unnecessary exposition and comic beats that even the show feels embarrassed by. But when it works, it works (particularly in the second half), and those small moments make the show worthwhile."

Jesse Schedeen of IGN gave the series a grade of seven out of ten, stating, "The good news is that the second episode of Guardians of the Galaxy improved a bit on the first. More screen time for Cosmo certainly didn't hurt, but it was also a matter of the show tapping into the group dynamic and their dysfunctional but close bond a little more. The show continues to frustrate in just how aggressively similar it is to the movie, but with the groundwork now laid and the promise of Star-Lord's heritage being a major focus going forward, hopefully the show can begin to define itself on its own merits." James Whitbrook of Gizmodo said that Guardians of the Galaxy has "gone from disappointing to delightful." Emily Ashby of Common Sense Media gave Marvel's Guardians of the Galaxy a grade of four out of five stars, noted the depiction of positive messages and role models across the characters, citing teamwork and altruism, and asserted, "Ragtag hero bunch's continuing story is violent but fun."

Joseph Ocasio of Comic Book Resources ranked Guardians of the Galaxy 8th in their "Best Marvel Animated Series" list, writing, "While the cartoon Guardians were not as fleshed out as their big-screen counterparts, the show captured most of what made the Guardians such wonderful characters. Star-Lord was still the lovable numbskull with a heart of gold, and Rocket was still the short-tempered rodent." Judy Black of Collider ranked Marvel's Guardians of the Galaxy 9th in their "12 Best Marvel Animated Series Not in the MCU" list, saying, "As people often point out, there are many fantastic aspects of animation that live-action adaptations simply cannot replicate. The quick and fluid movements, for instance, lead to some impressive gags that capture the personalities of the more eccentric characters, like Quill/Star-Lord. Additionally, Will Friedle does a fantastic job voicing Star-Lord, perhaps portraying him as a little less serious than his live-action counterpart. This cartoon was intended for kids, and oftentimes, it shows, particularly with its sometimes-predictable humor. Still, it offers many good laughs for the whole family."

=== Ratings ===
Season	Timeslot (ET)	Episodes	Premiered		Ended		Viewers (in millions)
Season	Timeslot (ET)	Episodes	Date	Premiere viewers (in millions)	Date	Finale viewers (in millions)	Viewers (in millions)
1	Saturday 9:30 p.m.	26	September 5, 2015	0.39		0.37	0.51

== In other media ==
In 2015, Marvel's Guardians of the Galaxy was adapted into a comic book series known as Marvel Universe: Guardians of the Galaxy. It uses the episode's art work with writing and lettering by Joe Caramagna. The first issue was released in February 2015.
