= The Black Vortex =

Marvel Comics storyline

- Publisher: Marvel Comics
- Publication date: February–April 2015
- Genre: Superhero; Crossover
- Main character(s): Guardians of the Galaxy; All New X-Men; Captain Marvel; Nova

Creative team
- Writer: Sam Humphries
- Penciller: Ed McGuinness
- Guardians of the Galaxy & X-Men: The Black Vortex: ISBN 978-0785197706

"The Black Vortex" is a 2015 comic book storyline published by Marvel Comics involving the All New X-Men and the Guardians of the Galaxy.

== Plot ==
=== Prologue ===
Star-Lord (Peter Quill) tries to avoid the Slaughter Lords and those hunting him for a bounty posted by Mister Knife, while attempting to maintain a long-distance relationship with Kitty Pryde. He is eventually caught by ex-Spartax warriors led by his half-sister, Captain Victoria. Together they concoct a plan to turn him in on the prison planet Viderdoom, collect the bounty, and then steal the remaining funds from Blight, the jailer.

The Slaughter Lords approach Thanos' son Thane with an offer to join Mister Knife, but Thane has disavowed violence and become a minister. Mister Knife secretly kills the congregation in a plot to enrage Thane into joining his cause. Mister Knife later captures Star-Lord while he is teleconferencing with Kitty Pryde, and Star-Lord learns that Mister Knife is actually his father, J'son, the dethroned emperor of Spartax.

Kitty Pryde rescues Star-Lord by throwing herself from her ship and phasing through his flying fortress. She grabs Peter Quill while phasing both of them through the bottom of the fortress, landing back in her ship. At first, she is angry that Quill is back to his pirating ways. Learning that he sends everything to an orphanage on Spartax, Pryde decides that she will help him steal the Black Vortex from J'son.

=== Main event ===
Twelve billion years ago, an ancient race called the Viscardi were visited by a Celestial. He gifted them with a mirror known as the Black Vortex. Those who "submit" to the Black Vortex gain Celestial power, and with this immense power the Viscardi attacked each other toward extinction. There was only one survivor, Gala, and the Vortex was lost.

J'son locates the Black Vortex after visiting a Celestial graveyard. Kitty Pryde and Star-Lord decide to steal it before J'son uses it on himself and Thane. However, he uses it on his Slaughter Lords. Kitty and Star-Lord recruit the X-Men, Nova, and the Guardians of the Galaxy to prevent the Slaughter Lords from retrieving the Black Vortex. Greatly overpowered when the Slaughter Lords attack, Gamora, Beast, and Angel submit and tip the balance of the battle. The team then fights among themselves, and Ronan the Accuser steals the Vortex.

Gamora, Beast, and Angel are enraged and attack Hala, the Kree empire's capital planet. The team split into three groups: one battles Gamora, Beast, and Angel; the second stays on Spartax to distract the Slaughter Lords; and the third team speaks with the Kree Supreme Intelligence. The Supreme Intelligence demands that Ronan stand down until their star fleet can return, but Ronan uses the Vortex. He is successful in repelling Gamora, Beast, and Angel, but is banished by the Supreme Intelligence. The Slaughter Lords and J'son use this opportunity to sneak into Hala to steal the Vortex, and the floating fortress unleashes a massive barrage that destroys Hala. The heroes narrowly escape, and Nova acquires the Vortex from the Slaughter Lords. The Collector follows Nova to Earth and attempts to steal the Vortex, but Nova goes to Spartax and unknowingly returns it to J'son, who empowers Thane. Thane then uses his super-powered "Living Death" and engulfs Spartax in amber. J'son allows the Brood to invade Spartax and use its citizens as hosts. His plan was to take out the two largest empires, Spartax and Hala, allowing the Brood to spread, then use it to take over the galaxy.

Cyclops, Iceman, and Groot are captured by the Slaughter Lords but are able to escape and steal the Vortex. They give themselves cosmic powers and pass the Vortex to Captain Marvel. She is confronted by a super-powered Thane and J'son and resists the temptation to use the Vortex, instead using the mirror surface to reflect Thane's Living Death blast at J'son, encasing him in amber. Gala then returns, defeats Thane, and attempts to destroy the Black Vortex before it can corrupt anyone else. Captain Marvel is able to return the Vortex to the team, and they debate who should use the power one more time to save Spartax. Jean Grey offers, but everybody is worried about a repeat of the Dark Phoenix. Star-Lord contemplates but knows if he is super-powered he will waste his potential. Kitty Pryde volunteers to shoulder the burden. Gala agrees to it being used one last time.

Kitty Pryde gains cosmic powers and uses her phasing ability to phase out the entire planet of Spartax from the amber, except for the Brood, which are destroyed. The Slaughter Lords retreat afterwards. Cyclops, Iceman, Groot, and Beast return their cosmic powers, but Gamora, Angel, Kitty, and Ronan keep theirs. Star-Lord then proposes to Kitty. Gala takes away the Black Vortex. The Collector collects the amber-encased J'son. Ebony Maw then attaches himself to the cosmically powered Thane.

In the aftermath, Ronan vows to rebuild the Kree Empire. Victoria meets with the Collector and strikes a deal with him in order to secure J'son's body, but secretly steals the last remaining seed of the Kree Supreme Intelligence.

== Titles involved ==
Number	Title	Issue(s)
Prologue
	Legendary Star-Lord	#4–8
Main series
Part One	Guardians of the Galaxy & X-Men: The Black Vortex Alpha	#1
Part Two	Guardians of the Galaxy (vol. 3)	#24
Part Three	Legendary Star-Lord	#9
Part Four	All New X-Men	#38
Part Five	All New X-Men	#39
Part Six	Guardians Team-Up	#3
Part Seven	Guardians of the Galaxy (vol. 3)	#25
Part Eight	Nova (vol. 5)	#28
Part Nine	Legendary Star-Lord	#10
Part Ten	Cyclops (vol. 3)	#12
Part Eleven	Captain Marvel (vol. 8)	#14
Part Twelve	Legendary Star-Lord	#11
Part Thirteen	Guardians of the Galaxy & X-Men: The Black Vortex Omega	#1

== Collected editions ==
Title	Material collected	Publication date	ISBN
Guardians of the Galaxy & X-Men: The Black Vortex	Guardians of the Galaxy & X-Men: The Black Vortex Alpha #1, Guardians of the Galaxy (vol. 3) #24–25, Legendary Star-Lord #9–11, All-New X-Men #38–39, Guardians Team-Up #3, Nova (vol. 5) #28, Cyclops (vol. 3) #12, Captain Marvel (vol. 8) #14, Guardians of the Galaxy & X-Men: The Black Vortex Omega #1.	July 2015	978-0785197706

== In other media ==
- The Black Vortex storyline was added as an add-on mission in the Facebook game Marvel: Avengers Alliance in June 2016.
- The Black Vortex storyline was adapted as a four-part story arc in Disney XD's Guardians of the Galaxy. This version of the Vortex is owned by Thanos, serves as a prison trapping victims inside their own thoughts, and contains several alternate dimensions with different animation styles.
