= Star-Lord =

Comic book fictional character

- Textless variant cover of Star-Lord #1 (December 2016). Art by Kris Anka

Publication information
- Publisher: Marvel Comics
- First appearance: Marvel Preview #4 (January 1976, overall debut); Thanos Vol. 1 #8 (March 2004, Earth-616 debut)
- Created by: Steve Englehart; Steve Gan

In-story information
- Alter ego: Peter Jason Quill
- Species: Human/Spartoi hybrid
- Team affiliations: Guardians of the Galaxy; Infinity Watch; Ravagers; United Front; Nova Corps
- Partnerships: Gamora
- Notable aliases: Master of the Sun
- Abilities: Human/Spartoi hybrid physiology grants him enhanced strength, durability, and longevity: Strength augmentation via advanced suit; Master tactician and field commander; Expert hand-to-hand combatant and master martial artist; Expert marksman; Expert user of various kinds of alien technology and weapons; Flight via jet boots; Utilizing dual elemental guns, and helmet providing survivability in space, and formerly used a universal translator implant in his neck

Star-Lord (Peter Jason Quill) is a superhero appearing in American comic books published by Marvel Comics. Created by Steve Englehart and Steve Gan, the character first appeared in Marvel Preview #4 (January 1976) and being reintroduced to the main comic universe, Earth-616 in Thanos Vol. 1 #8 (March 2004). The son of human Meredith Quill and Spartoi J'son, Peter Quill assumes the mantle of Star-Lord, an interplanetary policeman.

The character played prominent roles in the comic book storylines "Annihilation" (2006) and "Annihilation: Conquest" (2007), "War of Kings" (2008), The Thanos Imperative (2009), and Old Man Quill (2019). He became the leader of the space-based superhero team Guardians of the Galaxy in the 2008 relaunch of the comic of the same name. He has been featured in a variety of associated Marvel merchandise, including animated television series, toys and trading cards.

Chris Pratt portrays the character in the Marvel Cinematic Universe films Guardians of the Galaxy (2014), Guardians of the Galaxy Vol. 2 (2017), Avengers: Infinity War (2018), Avengers: Endgame (2019), Thor: Love and Thunder, The Guardians of the Galaxy Holiday Special (both 2022), and Guardians of the Galaxy Vol. 3 (2023). Wyatt Oleff portrays a young Peter Quill in the first two Guardians of the Galaxy films. Quill also appeared in the Disney+ animated series What If...? (2021).

== Creation ==
Steve Englehart had plans for the character that went unrealized. He later reflected on his website:

I conceived something very large. My hero would go from being an unpleasant, introverted jerk to the most cosmic being in the universe, and I would tie it into my then-new interest in Astrology. After his earthbound beginning, his mind would be opened step by step, with a fast-action story on Mercury, a love story on Venus, a war story on Mars, and so on out to the edge of the solar system, and then beyond. But—after his earthbound beginning, where I established him as an unpleasant, introverted jerk, I left Marvel, so no one ever saw what he was to become.

Englehart would later state that the story on Jupiter would be about Government, and that his version of the character was not a part of the Marvel universe and was "completely standalone".

== Publication history ==
The character first appeared in the black-and-white magazine publication Marvel Preview #4 (Jan 1976). Star-Lord continued to appear in Marvel Preview, with writer Chris Claremont revamping the character and drawing inspiration from science fiction adventure stories such as the Heinlein juveniles. Heinlein's lawyers threatened legal action over the cover to Marvel Preview #11, which featured a blurb that described the content as "a novel-length science fiction spectacular in the tradition of Robert A. Heinlein", leading to the issue being pulled and reprinted. The story in #11 marked the first collaboration of the celebrated X-Men creative trio of writer Chris Claremont, penciller John Byrne, and inker Terry Austin. Star-Lord made sporadic appearances over the next few years in the titles Marvel Super Special, Marvel Spotlight, and Marvel Premiere. The Marvel Spotlight installments, which marked Star-Lord's first appearance in a traditional comic book format, served to consolidate the separate but complementary origin stories from his two appearances in Marvel Preview. In February 1982, a color reprint of the black-and-white Star-Lord story from Marvel Preview #11 was published with a new framing sequence by Claremont and artist Michael Golden.

The character returned in Thanos #8–12 (May–Sept. 2004) and Annihilation #1-6 (2006). The following year, he received a four issue eponymous title (Annihilation: Conquest – Star-Lord) leading into the "Annihilation: Conquest" crossover storyline, in which he played a central role. Spinning out of "Annihilation: Conquest", a second volume of Guardians of the Galaxy featured a team of characters from the crossover who were led by Star-Lord for the duration of the title's 25-issue run. Plot lines from that series were concluded in The Thanos Imperative mini-series.

Because of revisions to the character's origin, his early appearances have been officially designated as occurring in an alternate reality.

Star-Lord returned, along with other members of the Guardians, in Avengers Assemble #4-8 (June–Oct. 2012). He stars in Guardians of the Galaxy vol. 3, a part of the Marvel NOW! relaunch.

In July 2014, Star-Lord received his own ongoing series, Legendary Star-Lord. The character was also given a new costume, matching that seen in the Marvel Studios film Guardians of the Galaxy

His solo series and Guardians of the Galaxy vol. 3 ended as Marvel began its 2015 "Secret Wars" storyline. Star-Lord appeared as a main character in the core Secret Wars miniseries, and in a tie-in miniseries during the event, Star-Lord and Kitty Pryde.

During publication of "Secret Wars", Marvel premiered a new ongoing Star-Lord series, written by Sam Humphries, as part of the All-New, All-Different Marvel initiative, which focused on the character's revamped origins. This series also saw him leave the Guardians of the Galaxy, and replaced by his fiancée Kitty Pryde, who took over the identity of Star-Lord on the team's roster. The series lasted for eight issues. A subsequent Star-Lord ongoing series written by Chip Zdarsky began in December 2017 before being canceled after a six issues and one annual.

In April 2019, Peter Quill was given a 12 issue miniseries set in the Wastelands universe called Old Man Quill, which was written by Ethan Sacks and drawn by Robert Gill.

In November 2020, Peter Quill acquires the title and powers of Master of the Sun (which he had in his early original first appearance in the Marvel Premiere series of the 1970s and later retconned to be his Earth-791 counterpart) and it is revealed that the title was bestowed upon Peter by what and whom he believed to be a false memory from prior history, never truly lived. Being gifted entirely alien capabilities by said facsimile of his old mentor, Quill would gain incredible; albeit unexplored, new power which he can channel through his Element Gun. These as of yet unexplored faculties often manifest by the glow of his regrown left eye and the odd sun imprint tattooed to the palm of his right hand.

== Fictional character biography ==
When the Spartax prince J'son's ship crash lands in Colorado (Earth), he is taken in by a local farmer, Meredith Quill. The two form a relationship while J'son makes repairs to his ship, but he is soon contacted by his people with news that war has broken out and his leadership is needed. He leaves not knowing Meredith is pregnant with their son, who she names Peter.

Ten years later, Meredith is killed when she is attacked by two Badoon soldiers who have come to kill Peter and end J'son's blood line. A teenaged Peter defends himself with Meredith's shotgun, finds a weapon J'son had accidentally left behind, and escapes his home before it is destroyed by the Badoon ship. The Badoon presume Peter has been killed and leave. Now an orphan, Peter becomes an astronaut for NASA when he reaches adulthood. It was eventually explained that he was raised by his mother's best friend Lisa Chang, who was a commander at NASA.

During a mission where his ship malfunctions and leaves him stranded in space, Peter is found by the Ravagers, a group of space pirates led by Yondu. After the Ravagers save Peter, he tries to steal their ship, humiliates the Ravagers by outsmarting them, and even knocks out Yondu before capturing him. After Yondu awakens, he frees himself and attacks Peter, letting Peter choose between death and marooning. Peter instead asks Yondu if he could join the pirate captain's crew. Yondu eventually learns that the two share something in common: growing up as "kids without homes". He lets Peter stay on with the Ravagers as their cleaning boy. Peter slowly works his way up the Ravagers' ranks to become a seasoned pirate, picking up various skills and weapons from his new brethren.

Peter encounters the Fallen One, a former Herald of Galactus, and is almost killed defeating the entity, which results in his ship being destroyed and the Ravagers leaving him for dead. Peter and the Fallen One are subsequently imprisoned by the Nova Corps in the intergalactic prison called the Kyln. Peter is freed by the hero Nova during the Annihilation War and aids the Corps against the forces of Annihilus. He is subsequently appointed as military advisor to the Kree general Ronan the Accuser.

When the Kree homeworld of Hala is conquered by the Phalanx, Peter assumes the name Star-Lord and leads a band of rebels against the invaders until the war is over. Determined to prevent the atrocities he witnessed from happening again, Star-Lord forms a new version of the Guardians of the Galaxy. They are "proactive" and try to end emerging galactic threats early, but are unsuccessful at preventing a war between the Kree and Shi'ar. During a war with an invading universe, Star-Lord and Nova are prepared to sacrifice themselves to defeat Thanos but only Nova dies and Thanos escapes.

=== New Guardians and Kitty Pryde ===
Peter decides to remain inactive for a time until he discovers his father was planning to pass a law that forbade any interaction of extraterrestrial or space origin with Earth. Knowing this would be an open invitation for invasion, Peter decides to reform the Guardians with six members: Gamora, Rocket Raccoon, Groot, Drax the Destroyer, and Bug, along with himself, and start protecting Earth from any attack. Soon they aid the Avengers against the returned Thanos. After this, Star-Lord and his new team of Guardians engage in conflicts with the Badoon. He is soon captured by the army of Spartax but he escapes imprisonment and broadcasts a video showing the unfairness of his father's reign. During the war of the builders, he infiltrated the S.W.O.R.D. facilities and rescued Abigail Brand along with Rocket and new member Angela. He also declared war against the Shi'ar empire after intervening in one of their trials to rescue the kidnapped young Jean Grey along with the X-Men.

During this mission Peter meets Kitty Pryde, and the two eventually have a romantic relationship. Afterwards, the Guardians are cornered and captured by the Spartax Army. Peter is sent to Spartax where he confronts his father again and escapes after exposing once again his father's tyrannical reign. A riot forms in the Empire and J'son is deposed as a consequence. Peter keeps a low profile and remains dedicated to his long-distance relationship with Kitty. Soon he discovers he is elected by the Spartax people to be their new emperor. Peter ignores the announcement and focuses on Kitty and his search for a gangster named Mr. Knife who had put a bounty on his head. After being captured by Knife, he realizes Knife is J'son, his father. He escapes thanks to Kitty, and they spend some time together. Peter convinces Kitty to stay in space with him. He decides to steal an important artifact from J'son as payback.

=== The Black Vortex ===
Peter and Kitty were successful in stealing the artifact called The Black Vortex, but found themselves outnumbered by J'son's killing squad so they decided to call the X-Men and the remaining Guardians for help. Knowing the artifact could give them the needed power to defeat J'son, Peter wanted everyone to submit to the Vortex to gain cosmic powers. Kitty stood against the idea but some of their friends submitted anyway. After failing to stop them, the submitted cosmic warriors attacked Hala the Accuser and Peter went with a team to help the Kree in the battle. After some failed negotiations for the Vortex his team had to escape, but J'son found them and destroyed Hala in retaliation. Peter escaped on time. After finding Spartax had been completely covered in amber by Thane, including Kitty, Peter lamented not having heard her since the beginning and apologize to her. Kitty escaped thanks to her phasing powers and they had a reunion. Seeing no other way to defeat J'son and his cosmic empowered team, Peter tried to submit to the Vortex but after seeing the power would eventually make him push Kitty away, he refused. Kitty ended up submitting and saving Spartax. After the war ended, Peter had a romantic talk with Kitty where he proposes to her, a proposal which she accepts.

=== Secret Wars ===
When the universe is facing its imminent end, Star-Lord and the rest of the Guardians of the Galaxy come to the world's final battle against the Children of Tomorrow. During the battle, Groot and Rocket Raccoon are killed, and Star-Lord is teleported away by Reed Richards to his ship. In the end, he is one of the few survivors of the apocalypse aboard the Fantastic Four's "life raft". After the end of the universe, Doctor Doom somehow creates a new, patchwork world formed from the remains of dead universes. The life raft that Star-Lord was on remained in cryostasis for the next eight years, until they are awakened by Doctor Strange, a new Thor, and Miles Morales. Doom becomes aware of their location, and ambushes them. Knowing they are the only hope of reviving the old universe, Strange casts a spell to spread the survivors across the world using the wind, with Doom vowing to find them.

Star-Lord ends up in the domain of Manhattan, where he gets a job singing in the popular club, "the Quiet Room", singing Disney songs, as Disney films never existed in Battleworld, using the alias of Steve Rogers to hide from Doom. It is here that he runs into an alternate universe version of Kitty Pryde (from the Age of Apocalypse universe), who is hunting down artifacts from before Battleworld's creation. Hoping to talk to who he believes is his fiancée, he accidentally foils a deal between Kitty and Gambit to obtain an ancient artifact. Gambit leaves, but Kitty uses a scanner to discover that Star-Lord is from before Battleworld's creation, and she plans to take him to Doom. However, they are ambushed by a group of robots connected to Gambit. The two decide to steal an artifact that Gambit has, but it is a trap, and the two are captured. Right before Gambit can kill them, a version of Drax appears. Drax hired Peter to work in the Quiet Room. Drax knocks out Gambit. The three leave with the artifact secured. When they are safe the next morning, Kitty shows it to the two, only to find out its Rocket Raccoon's tail. Star-Lord laments the death of his friend, and Kitty decides to allow him to keep it, as it is the one thing left of his old universe. Star-Lord thanks Kitty, who kisses him before heading back to her home of Doomguard. Realizing the two are out of a job for abandoning the Quiet Room in the middle of a show, Star-Lord and Drax decide to go back into Star-Lord's old career as a thief. He asks Drax if he knows a good geneticist, as he plans on using Rocket's tail to make a clone of his friend, possibly an army of them.

During the final stand against God Doom, Peter not only piloted a ship to take the two Reed Richardses to the heart of Castle Doom, but also managed to keep Black Swan occupied by using the last twig of Groot, kept in his pocket ever since the Incursions to be planted at the crucial moment.

=== All-New, All-Different Marvel ===
Following the restoration of reality, Peter ascends to the throne of Spartax, with Rocket taking over leadership of the Guardians while Kitty (under the alias Star-Lady) and the Thing (following the disbanding of the Fantastic Four while the Richards family worked to restore the multiverse) joins the team. After Hala the Accuser and Yotat the Destroyer cause mass destruction on Spartax while trying to eliminate Quill, he returns to the Guardians due to the accusations of his delegates about his responsibility for the resulting deaths.

During the Civil War II storyline, Star-Lord and the Guardians of the Galaxy assist Captain Marvel as her surprise weapon in the fight against Iron Man. During the battle, the Guardians ship is destroyed which leaves them stranded on Earth. After Iron Man's faction leaves, Gamora overhears a conversation between Peter and Kitty in which she learns that Peter knew (without telling the rest of the team) that Thanos was on Earth the entire time they were there. After stopping Gamora from storming into the Triskelion and killing Thanos, Gamora and the other Guardians leave Peter due to the secrecy. Peter and Kitty then break off their engagement.

=== Grounded ===
Living alone in an apartment given to him by Abigail Brand, Peter calls Howard the Duck to try and have drinks with him, and Howard furiously hangs up. He then finds Kitty and Old Man Logan in an art gallery, where Kitty shouts at him for carrying his guns into an art gallery with children. Frustrated, Peter leaves. Logan then catches up to him and has drinks with him in a bar, where they fight hitmen, which attracts the attention of the police. Logan flees the scene and Peter is captured.

Peter is prosecuted by Matt Murdock, who argues that unlike other superheroes, Star-Lord was reckless and endangered civilians while causing substantial property damage. The trial is interrupted by Brand, who gets the judge to reduce Peter's sentence to community service, to which Peter agrees. Brand and Alpha Flight then give him a new skin-tight costume, and he is assigned to senior citizen Edmund Allen, a retired super-criminal named Silver Bandit. After a day of bonding, Star-Lord is hired as a bartender at a bar for supervillains owned by Edmund's son.

=== Master of the Sun ===
When the reborn Olympians began wreaking havoc throughout the universe, Richard Rider interrupted the Guardians' party and asked them for help to deal with the mad gods. Despite other Guardians' wishes to rest, Peter was unable to do so while innocent people were being killed, and that, alongside recurring visions of the Master of the Sun asking him if his life felt lacking as of late, drove him along with Rocket Raccoon to join Nova and an assortment of other cosmic heroes to fight the Olympians. While Nova and Captain Marvel distracted some of the gods, Star-Lord, Rocket, and Moondragon snuck inside the Olympians' interdimensional ship intending to blow it up. However, before this was accomplished, the team was discovered by Hermes and Artemis, who had remained behind. After Star-Lord was captured by Hephaestus, he killed the Olympian, and remained behind to detonate the bomb and destroy New Olympus while the rest of the strike team evacuated. The bomb successfully detonated, destroying New Olympus, with Star-Lord seemingly dying along with it.

However, Quill did not die in the blast, and was instead transported to a different universe after the explosion. He was taken in by a pair of travelers on this new world, Mors and Aradia, to whom he eventually acquitted himself both as friends as well as family and eventually lovers, while spending more than one-hundred and eighty seven years running a gauntlet of escapades with them. He came to see that his Element Gun had changed significantly since when last he used it; initially the blaster had a finite charge on which elements he could churn out at which succession, but because he'd used it to siphon the divine energies of Olympus's pantheon, he found that use of the gun did not seem to diminish its power supply. Whilst out camping with his new companions, Quill's fears, including an underlying suspicion as to why his personal keepsake never lost its juice, were confirmed by the reappearance of the mad Olympians. They revealed the constant use of Peter's signature weapon that bound and drained their powers also freed the petty gods from captivity with each usage, and that now they sought to reacquire their stolen might from him by any means necessary. Feeling responsible for bringing their wrath down upon their world, Quill opts to take a portal back to his universe to lead them away from his new home. In doing so he is met by the Master who states that having passed the test of his new life, he will make Quill into the one true Star-Lord: the Master of the Sun. Arriving on Spartax in time to witness a symbiote dragon laying waste to his homeworld, Star-Lord catches up on all the events he'd missed, and, with Nova's help, dove into the dragon and confronted Knull, the dark god of the symbiotes. Knull attempted to infect Star-Lord and the other Guardians with living abyss to turn them into his soldiers, but Star-Lord used the power he had obtained from the Olympians to kill the dragon and render its living abyss inert. Despite his new powers making him a powerful contender against Knull, Quill refused to return to Earth and face him, instead opting to prepare for the return of the Olympians.

=== Imperial ===
During the Imperial storyline, J'son and Peter Quill's half-sister Victoria are attacked as part of a conspiracy targeting galactic leaders. J'son is killed, while Victoria is poisoned and placed in stasis to slow the poison's effects. It is later revealed that Victoria survived and that her condition has stabilized; Peter assumes the throne of Spartax until she can recover.

== Powers and abilities ==
Star-Lord is a master strategist and problem solver who is an expert in close-quarter combat, various human and alien firearms, and battle techniques. He has extensive knowledge of various alien customs, societies, and cultures, and considerable knowledge about cosmic abstracts, such as Oblivion.

As Star-Lord, Peter Quill wears a suit that grants augmented strength and durability and the ability to travel through space. He uses an "Element Gun", a special meta-pistol capable of projecting one of the four elements (air, earth, fire and water). Star-Lord shares a psychic link with his sentient space vessel, Ship.

Ship is a sentient energy form. She most often exists in the form of a starship but can alter her structure at will. She can travel through air, space and water. She possesses many of the conventional starship accessories, including shields, energy blasters, advanced sensors, replicators (able to form any kind of food, drink, etc.), and hologram projectors. She has proven capable of creating a human form, which she can then animate and use as a host. Even if completely destroyed, she is capable of restoring herself, since her true form is her consciousness. In addition, she takes on a number of feminine characteristics, such as a mothering instinct for those she is partnered with. She has felt deeper attachments, including love for her partners.

Ship can create Widgets—small, mobile droids able to scout out situations, gather information, and then return to her. The full extent of Ship's abilities are unknown. During Star-Lord's battle with The Fallen One, his element gun, suit and Ship were destroyed. Due to severe injury, he was grafted with cybernetic implants by doctors on the Kyln, where he was sentenced. The eye implant allows him to see all energy spectra and the memory chip in his brain gives him 100% total recall.

On the Kree world of Aladon Prime, Star-Lord's cybernetic implants were removed. Star-Lord was outfitted with a Kree-issued heat-dampening espionage battle-suit, which became the hallmark look for the Guardians of the Galaxy, a battle helmet, and a universal translator, all of which he still uses. His battle helmet can analyze strategy data, improve vision, and regulate oxygen in space. Star-Lord's chosen weapons are two Kree sub-machine guns with various types of ammunition, including explosives. After escaping the Cancerverse, Peter acquires a new element gun(s), but he discards his armor.

As Master of the Sun - while meditating on his new lease on life, Quill demonstrated levitation in a sitting position while trying to focus his powers for the upcoming battle. Often when Quill finds his center of being or is utilizing his power through the magitek sidearm, Quill's body glows with a bright gold radiance, the light emitted being so powerful that he can blow apart a Symbiote Dragon by channeling said force through the blaster. Star-Lord's transformation has seemingly rendered him immune to psionic intrusion, as Moondragon could not penetrate the defenses his mind seemed to subconsciously throw up whenever she drifted towards him. The Element Blaster initially held a finite charge limit to its ability to channel and redistribute energy towards manipulating natural materials, but after having gained total control over various metaphysical dynamics pertaining to the universe, Quill now acts as his own dynamo to power said weapon. Quill has recently picked up new tricks, such as having a recall ability which guides his pistol back to his hand once he calls for it.

== Reception ==
=== Accolades ===
- In 2018, CBR.com ranked Star-Lord 20th in their "20 Guardians Of The Galaxy Members Ranked From Weakest To Strongest" list and 24th in their "25 Most Powerful Guardians Of The Galaxy" list.
- In 2018, GameSpot ranked Star-Lord 43rd in their "50 Most Important Superheroes" list.
- In 2022, The A.V. Club ranked Star-Lord 41st in their "100 best Marvel characters" list.
- In 2022, CBR.com ranked Star-Lord 7th in their "10 Best Cosmic Heroes in Marvel Comics" list.

== Other characters named Star-Lord ==
A three-issue limited series, Starlord, features a man Sinjin Quarrel who adopts the identity 12 years after the disappearance of the original Star-Lord (Peter Jason Quill). The series was published from December 1996 to February 1997. It was written by Timothy Zahn, with art by Dan Lawlis.

== Other versions ==
=== Age of Ultron ===
During the 2013 Age of Ultron storyline, Wolverine and Susan Storm accidentally create an alternate timeline after traveling back in time and assassinating Hank Pym before he can create Ultron. In the new reality, Star-Lord is seen as a member of the Defenders, who have replaced the defunct Avengers as the world's premier superhero team.

=== Classic Star-Lord ===
Star-Lord's adventures in Marvel Preview #4 and #11 have been officially designated as occurring in an alternate past. In these issues, Peter Quill is born during an unusual astronomical phenomenon when many of the planets align. Seeing no resemblance, the man who believed he was Quill's father accuses his wife Meredith of infidelity and attempts to kill the infant, but dies of a sudden heart attack. Peter is raised by his single mother until she is killed by Ariguans when he is eleven. Quill is placed in an orphanage, but escapes and eventually becomes a trainee NASA astronaut.

An alien entity called the Master of the Sun later visits the space station that Quill and other astronauts are inhabiting and offers the mantle of Star-Lord (an interplanetary policeman) to a worthy candidate. Quill volunteers, but he is rejected in favor of a colleague he once treated badly. Quill is outraged, and NASA orders his return to Earth and discharge for his conduct. Instead, he steals a scout ship, returns to the space station, and takes his colleague's place. Quill becomes Star-Lord, with the Master of the Sun first creating an illusion in which the character is able to find and kill the aliens that murdered his mother to free him of his past. Equipped with a sentient vessel called "Ship", Quill commences his role as Star-Lord.

Years later, Star-Lord becomes involved in stopping a group of slavers who are destroying worlds. His efforts led him to discover a conspiracy to replace the emperor of the Spartoi empire. To thwart the takeover, Star-Lord travels to the imperial throneworld Sparta where he encounters and kills the alien who killed his mother. Star-Lord then meets Emperor Jason who reveals that he is Peter's father. Jason explains that he had crashed on Earth decades earlier and been rescued by Meredith Quill. During the year that he had spent repairing his ship, Jason and Meredith fell in love. When it came time to leave, Jason, for Meredith's safety, had placed a mindlock on her memories of him, causing her to remember their year together as only a dream.

=== Starkill ===
Lord Starkill debuted in Captain Marvel #126 in 2018. An evil version of Star-Lord from an alternate universe, Lord Starkiller is a vicious mercenary and killer who possesses the Reality Stone and is allied with Thanos.

=== Old Man Quill ===
In Old Man Quill: Nobody's Fault But My Own, based in the Wastelands universe, Peter Quill eventually becomes the emperor of Spartax. He leaves the Guardians of the Galaxy and Gamora to marry L'ssa and fathers two children; however, the Universal Church of Truth draws him out in a firefight, which leaves his homeworld vulnerable to attack. The Church annihilates the planet, destroying everything and everyone he loves.

A devastated Quill is found by an aged version of the Guardians, recruiting him for one more adventure back on Earth that will give him revenge on the Church, now led by Galactus. However, after discovering what happened to the other heroes of Earth, it is eventually revealed that Quill has been hallucinating all of the other Guardians for the duration of his quest, and the real Guardians have been killed by Galactus. With the Ultimate Nullifier having been destroyed, Quill eventually defeats Galactus by shooting him in the head with the Time Stone, displacing part of Galactus's brain. With the death of Galactus, most of the Church are revealed to have been brainwashed thralls who break away. Peter subsequently forms a new team of Guardians, including Beta Ray Bill, Moondragon, Phyla-Vell, Nebula, and Groot, to deal with the rest of the Church.

=== Ultimate Universe ===
An alternate universe version of Star-Lord appears in the Ultimate Universe imprint. This version is member of the 61st century's Guardians of the Galaxy and Master of the Solar System.

=== Predator Kills the Marvel Universe ===
In the intercompany crossover Predator Kills the Marvel Universe, Star-Lord and his fellow Guardians of the Galaxy are the first heroes slaughtered by Kraven the Hunter and the Yautja.

== In other media ==
=== Television ===
- Star-Lord appears in The Avengers: Earth's Mightiest Heroes episode "Michael Korvac", voiced by Steve Downes.
- Star-Lord appears in Ultimate Spider-Man, voiced by Chris Cox.
- Star-Lord appears in Avengers Assemble, voiced by Chris Cox in the episode "Guardians and Space Knights" and by Will Friedle in "Widow's Run".
- Star-Lord appears in Hulk and the Agents of S.M.A.S.H., voiced by Chris Cox in the episodes "It's a Wonderful Smash" and "Guardians of the Galaxy" and by Will Friedle in "Planet Monster".
- Star-Lord appears in the Marvel Disk Wars: The Avengers episode "Guardians of the Galaxy", voiced by Go Inoue in the Japanese version and by Mick Wingert in the English dub.
- Star-Lord appears in Guardians of the Galaxy (2015), voiced again by Will Friedle.
- Star-Lord appears in Lego Marvel Super Heroes - Guardians of the Galaxy: The Thanos Threat, voiced again by Will Friedle.
- Star-Lord appears in the Spider-Man episode "Amazing Friends", voiced again by Will Friedle.

=== Film ===
Star-Lord makes a non-speaking cameo appearance in Planet Hulk.

=== Marvel Cinematic Universe ===
Chris Pratt portrays Peter Quill / Star-Lord in media set in the Marvel Cinematic Universe. This version is the son of Ego the Living Planet and the paternal half-brother of Mantis, and additionally inherited Celestial abilities from Ego before losing them following his death. He first appears in Guardians of the Galaxy (2014) and makes subsequent appearances in Guardians of the Galaxy Vol. 2, Avengers: Infinity War, Avengers: Endgame, Thor: Love and Thunder, The Guardians of the Galaxy Holiday Special, and Guardians of the Galaxy Vol. 3. Additionally, alternate universe variants of Quill appear in What If...?.

=== Video games ===
- Star-Lord appears in LittleBigPlanet as part of the "Marvel Costume Kit 5" DLC.
- Star-Lord appears as an alternate skin in the Xbox and PlayStation versions of Minecraft via the "Guardians of the Galaxy" DLC pack.
- Star-Lord appears as an unlockable playable character in Marvel Avengers Alliance.
- Star-Lord appears in Marvel Heroes.
- Three incarnations of Star-Lord appear as playable characters in Marvel Puzzle Quest.
- Star-Lord appears as an unlockable playable character in Lego Marvel Super Heroes.
- Star-Lord appears as a playable character in Disney Infinity 2.0.
- Star-Lord appears as an unlockable playable character in Marvel Contest of Champions.
- Star-Lord appears as an unlockable playable character in Marvel: Future Fight.
- Star-Lord appears as a playable character in Disney Infinity 3.0.
- Star-Lord appears in Guardians of the Galaxy: The Telltale Series, voiced by Scott Porter as an adult and Jeremy Shada as a child.
- Star-Lord appears as an unlockable playable character in Lego Marvel Super Heroes 2, voiced by Kerry Shale.
- Star-Lord appears as a playable character in Marvel Strike Force.
- Star-Lord appears as a playable character in Marvel Powers United VR, voiced again by Chris Cox.
- Star-Lord appears in Marvel Battle Lines, voiced again by Will Friedle.
- Star-Lord appears as a playable character in Marvel Ultimate Alliance 3: The Black Order, voiced again by Scott Porter.
- Star-Lord appears in Marvel Dimension of Heroes, voiced again by Will Friedle.
- Star-Lord appears as a purchasable outfit in Fortnite Battle Royale.
- Star-Lord appears as a playable character in Marvel Future Revolution, voiced again by Scott Porter. Additionally, several alternate reality versions of Star-Lord, such as one who became the guardian of a settlement on Sakaar and one who followed Angela into Niflheim, appear as NPCs.
- Star-Lord appears as a playable character in Marvel's Guardians of the Galaxy, voiced by Jon McLaren as an adult and Hudson LeBlanc as a child.
- Star-Lord appears in Marvel Snap.
- Star-Lord appears as a playable character in Marvel Rivals, voiced again by Scott Porter in English.
- Star-Lord appears as a playable character in Marvel Tōkon: Fighting Souls, voiced again by Scott Porter in English and Koichi Yamadera in Japanese. While remaining a leader of Guardians of the Galaxy, Star-Lord joins Spider-Man, Ms. Marvel, and Peni Parker to form the Amazing Guardians during the Champion of the Universe's tournament, with Spider-Man leading the team.

=== Merchandise ===
- Star-Lord received a figure in the Marvel Universe toy line as part of a three pack with Drax the Destroyer, Rocket Raccoon, and a mini Groot accessory.
- Star-Lord received a figure in the Groot Build-A-Figure line.
- The MCU incarnation of Star-Lord received a figure from Hot Toys' 1:6 scale line.
- The MCU incarnation of Star-Lord's mask and weapons were released by Nerf as role-play toys.

=== Miscellaneous ===
- Star-Lord appears in Guardians of the Galaxy – Mission: Breakout!, voiced by Chris Pratt.
- The Old Man Quill version of Star-Lord appears in Marvel's Wastelanders: Old Man Star-Lord, voiced by Timothy Busfield.

== Collected editions ==
Title	Material collected	Published date	ISBN
Annihilation: Conquest: Book One	Annihilation: Conquest - Star-Lord #1-4 and Annihilation: Conquest Prologue, Annihilation: Conquest - Quasar #1-4	October 2008	978-0785127826
Star-Lord: Guardian of the Galaxy	Marvel Preview #4, 11, 14-15, 18, Marvel Super Special #10, Marvel Spotlight (vol. 2) #6-7, Marvel Premiere #61, and Star-Lord (vol. 1) #1-3	July 2014	978-0785154495
Legendary Star-Lord Vol. 1: Face It, I Rule	Legendary Star-Lord #1-5	February 2015	978-0785191599
Legendary Star-Lord Vol. 2: Rise of the Black Vortex	Legendary Star-Lord #6-12	August 2015	978-0785191605
Legendary Star-Lord Vol. 3: First Flight	Star-Lord (vol. 2) #1-5	July 2016	978-0785196242
Legendary Star-Lord Vol. 4: Out of Orbit	Star-Lord (vol. 2) #6-8 and Avengers (vol. 1) #28, 51, 174	November 2016	978-0785196259
Star-Lord and Kitty Pryde	Star-Lord and Kitty Pryde #1-3, Generation Next #1, and Guardians of the Galaxy and X-Men: The Black Vortex Omega	December 2015	978-0785198437
Star-Lord: Grounded	Star-Lord (vol. 3) #1-6	July 2017	978-1302905545
Old Man Quill Vol. 1: Nobody's Fault But My Own	Old Man Quill #1-6	August 2019	978-1302916695
Old Man Quill Vol. 2: Go Your Own Way	Old Man Quill #7-12	February 2020	978-1302916701
