= J'son (character) =

- J'son as depicted in Legendary Star-Lord #5 (November 2014). Art by Paco Medina (penciler), Juan Vlasco (inker), and David Curiel (colorist).

Publication information
- Publisher: Marvel Comics
- First appearance: Marvel Preview #11 (June 1977)
- Created by: Chris Claremont (writer); John Byrne (artist)

In-story information
- Alter ego: J'son
- Species: Spartoi
- Notable aliases: Jason of Spartax; Mister Knife; Emperor J'Son

J'son is a fictional character appearing in American comic books published by Marvel Comics. He is the leader of the alien Spartax empire as well as the father of Star-Lord and Victoria (a Captain from Spartax).

== Publication history ==
Emperor Jason of Sparta first appeared in Marvel Preview #11 and was created by Chris Claremont and John Byrne. Jason is the father of Star-Lord, who was introduced in Marvel Preview #4.

Prince Jason of Spartax first appeared in Inhumans vol. 3 #2 in 2000. He was originally intended to be Jason from Marvel Preview #11, but earlier in history.

In 2013, King J'son of Spartax was introduced in Guardians of the Galaxy vol. 3 #0.1. Due to the continuity issues that this revised origin story caused, Marvel Comics decided that there were two versions of Star-Lord and that the events of Marvel Preview #11 and other appearances of the "classic" Star-Lord occurred in the parallel universe of Earth-791.

== Fictional character biography ==
J'son is the heir to the throne of Spartax who fled the planet during a conflict with the Badoon. His ship crash-lands on Earth, where Meredith Quill takes him in. The two form a relationship while J'son repairs his ship. J'son is forced to leave to return home and fight in a war, not knowing Meredith is pregnant with Peter Quill.

Years later, J'son becomes the king of the Spartax, joins the Galactic Council, and declares Earth off-limits to extraterrestrial interaction. After Star-Lord defends Earth from a Badoon attack, J'son sends soldiers to capture him and the Guardians of the Galaxy. However, the Guardians manage to escape.

In an attempt to get rid of the Guardians and make his son join him, all of the Guardians are separately dealt with by the Spartoi and their allies under Captain Victoria, J'son's illegitimate child. However, Captain Marvel saves Peter Quill, who discredits J'son to the whole empire by revealing him as a heartless murderer. The entire Spartoi empire rebels against J'son, who is forced to flee.

After Star-Lord and Kitty Pryde decide to steal the Black Vortex from J'son, Mister Knife sends the Slaughter Lords to hunt them down and recover it. After numerous failed attempts to recover the Vortex, Mister Knife manages to get his hands on it. As part of a deal with Thane, he submits to the Black Vortex and uses his cosmically enhanced power to encase the entirety of Spartax in amber. Mister Knife gives Spartax to the Brood in exchange for taking advantage of their expansion and acquiring one planet for every ten worlds they conquer.

When Captain Marvel retrieves the Black Vortex, she is cornered by Thane and J'son, who demand she give them the Vortex back. When Thane attempts to encase Carol in amber, she uses the Vortex as a shield and deflects the attack towards J'son. J'son, encased in amber, floats through Spartax's orbit until he is found by the Collector, who is too late to recover the Vortex, but settles for adding J'son to his collection. Victoria later recovers J'son and brings him back to Spartax.

In the 2025 event Imperial, J'son is killed by an unidentified Wakandan agent as part of a larger conspiracy targeting galactic leaders.

== Other versions ==
=== Earth-791 ===
Jason first appears in Marvel Preview #11, but after Peter Quill's introduction to Earth-616 in 2004, this issue and other appearances of "classic" Star-Lord were officially designated as occurring in Earth-791 due to continuity issues. In this issue, Star-Lord meets his father and learns of his past. Years earlier, Jason was summoned by his father when war broke out between the Spartoi and the Ariguans. On his way back home, he was forced to crash-land on Earth, where he fell in love with a human woman named Meredith Quill. The two began a year-long relationship before Jason was forced to leave to wage war for Spartax. Wishing to shield Meredith from the pain of his departure, Jason erased her memories of him. Meredith would later go on to give birth to his son Peter Quill. Jason would eventually go on to take his father's place as emperor. After telling Star-Lord this story, Jason offers him a place as heir to the throne. Peter refuses; in his stead, Jason adopts Kip Holm as his future heir.

=== Inhumans vol. 3 ===
Jason is part of the Spartoi race, distant relatives of the Shi'ar who separated from them millions of years ago. He is the only son of Emperor Eson, and therefore is prince and sole heir to the throne. Rejecting his idealism, the ruling Council of Ministers prevent J'son from taking the throne. When Ronan the Accuser of the Kree empire forces the Inhuman Royal Family to attempt to assassinate Shi'ar empress Lilandra Neramani, J'son is accused of being part of the plot. For this, he is banished and deemed unworthy of the throne.

== Powers and abilities ==
J'son uses Spartax weapons and under his Mister Knife persona, wields a fortress capable of destroying planets.

== In other media ==
J'son appears in the animated series Guardians of the Galaxy, voiced by Jonathan Frakes. This version is an ally of Thanos and the leader of the Universal Believers, who he brainwashed into serving him.
