= 1976 in comics =

Notable events of 1976 in comics.

== Events ==
=== Year overall ===
- American Splendor, Harvey Pekar's long-running autobiographical comic book title, publishes its debut issue.
- Fantagraphics Books, Inc. founded by Gary Groth and Michael Catron.
- Bloodstar, based on a short story by Robert E. Howard and illustrated by Richard Corben, published by Morning Star Press. It is possibly the first graphic novel to call itself a "graphic novel" in print.
- Chandler: Red Tide, an illustrated novel by Jim Steranko, published by Pyramid Books.
- Flying Buttress Publications (later to be known as NBM Publishing) is founded in Syracuse, New York by Terry Nantier.
- Superman vs. the Amazing Spider-Man, the first major intercompany crossover, is co-published by DC Comics and Marvel Comics.
- The final episode of Harry Hanan's comic series Louie is published.
- Jean Graton launches his sports comic series Julie Wood.
- Dwaine B. Tinsley launches Chester the Molester in Hustler.

=== January ===
- Jenette Kahn replaces Carmine Infantino as DC Comics' publisher and editorial director.
- DC revives All Star Comics with issue #58, continuing the numbering from the original 1940 series (ignoring the numbering from All-Star Western). Written by Gerry Conway, with art by Ric Estrada and Wally Wood.
- With issue #244 — after an eight-year hiatus — DC revives Blackhawk, which began in 1944 under Quality Comics, was acquired by DC in 1957, and stopped publishing in 1968.
- Marvel Super Action, a Curtis Magazines one-shot, edited by Archie Goodwin, is released.
- The first episode of Lo scimmiotto (The Monkey), by Silverio Pisu and Milo Manara, an adaptation of the Chinese classic Journey to the West, appears in the Italian magazine alterlinus.
- In France, Adèle and the beast, the first album of The Extraordinary Adventures of Adèle Blanc-Sec by Jacques Tardi, is released by Casterman.
- After a two-year hiatus, DC comics come back on Italian newsstands, with the first issue of Superman and Batman, by Edizioni Cenisio.

=== February ===
- February 16: The first episode of Murray Ball's gag comic Footrot Flats is published.

=== March ===
- March 1: The first episode of Moebius's The Airtight Garage is prepublished in Métal Hurlant.
- March 14 : In Topolino the first episode of The Forgetful Hero by Giorgio Pezzin and Giorgio Cavazzano is serialized.
- March 18: in Spirou, La frontiere de la vie by Roger Leluoup is prepublished.
- March 25 : in Spirou, La fille du canyon by Jijè (Jerry Spring series).
- DC Comics raises the prices of its standard comics from 25 cents to 30 cents, keeping the page-count at 36.
- Gerry Conway succeeds Marv Wolfman as Marvel Comics editor-in-chief in March 1976, but holds the job only briefly, relinquishing the post before the month is out, succeeded in turn by Archie Goodwin.
- The Warlord, with issue #2 (March /April cover date), goes on hiatus until October /November (DC Comics)
- First issue of the western series Jesus, by Enrico Missaglia, published by Renzo Barbieri.

=== April ===
- With issue #45, DC revives Metal Men, which itself was a 1973 revival of a 1963 series which had stopped publishing in 1969.
- In France, The Demon of the Eiffel Tower by Jacques Tardi, the second album of The Extraordinary Adventures of Adèle Blanc-Sec, is released by Casterman.
- In Il mago, the parodic noir series Big Sleeping, by Daniele Panebianco makes its debut.
- April 25: The first episode of the Astérix story Obelix and Co., by René Goscinny and Albert Uderzo is serialized in the Nouvel Observateur.

=== May ===
- Vince Colletta becomes the art director of DC Comics.
- In Metal hurlant, The long tomorrow, by Dan O’ Bannon and Moebius.

=== June ===
- June 19: The final episode of Jean-Pierre Girerd's On à Volé la Coupe Stanley is serialized in La Presse.
- Diane Noomin and Aline Kominsky release the one-shot comic book, Twisted Sisters, published by Last Gasp.
- Superman #300: "Superman, 2001!" — an imaginary story featuring a Superman who came to Earth in 1976 — by Cary Bates, Elliot S! Maggin, Curt Swan, and Bob Oksner. (DC Comics)
- Star Spangled War Stories #200, featuring the Unknown Soldier and Enemy Ace, edited by Joe Orlando. (DC Comics)
- The Incredible Hulk #200: "An Intruder in the Mind!" by Len Wein, Sal Buscema, and Joe Staton. (Marvel Comics)
- Kandrax il mago by Guido Nolitta and Gallieno Ferri; Kandrax, a druid by the extraordinary psychic powers, antagonist of Zagor makes his debut.
- Specific date in June unknown: The first episode of Roger Fletcher's long-running comic series Torkan appears in print.

=== July ===
- July 29: The first episode of Phil Collins' Leonardo is published.
- July 31: Lank Leonard's Mickey Finn comes to a close after 40 years of syndication.

=== August ===
- August 1: The final issue of the short-lived comic magazine Achille Talon magazine is published, based on the popularity of Michel Greg's Achille Talon.
- Captain America #200: Special Bicentennial issue, by Jack Kirby and Frank Giacoia.
- X-Men #100: "Greater Love Hath No X-Man..." by Chris Claremont and Dave Cockrum.
- With issue #90, DC revives the title Green Lantern under the name Green Lantern, co-Starring Green Arrow. The Green Lantern series previously began in 1960 and stopped publishing in 1972.
- Superman #302: The first issue with the restored credit that Superman was "created by Jerry Siegel and Joe Shuster."
- The first strips of Nilus, by the Origone brothers, appear on the Italian magazine Il mago.

=== September ===
- September 25: The first issue of the British comics magazine Roy of the Rovers is published. It will run until 1993.
- The Joe Kubert School of Cartoon and Graphic Art, founded by Joe Kubert and Muriel Kubert, begins teaching its first class of students, some of whom include Stephen R. Bissette, Thomas Yeates, and Rick Veitch.
- With issue #9 (September /October), DC suspends publication of Claw the Unconquered; it picks up again with issue #10 in 1978.
- Following DC's lead, Marvel Comics raises the prices of its standard comic book from 25 cents to 30 cents, keeping the page-count at 36.
- I promessi paperi (The Betrothed Ducks), by Edoardo Segantini and Giulio Cherchini, a parody of Alessandro Manzoni's The Betrothed (I promessi sposi), with Donald Duck and Daisy as Renzo and Lucia, appears in Topolino.

=== October ===
- October 4: The first episode of Stuart Hample's celebrity comic Inside Woody Allen appears in papers.
- October 10: on Il giornalino, Operazione tecno, by Nevio Zeccara; Kriss Boyd, agent of the Galactic Security Council gifted with paranormal powers, makes his debut.
- October 11: in Pif Gadget, first episode of the historical series, Eric le rouge, by Eduardo Teixeira Coelho and Jean Ollivier, inspired by the life of Erik the red.
- October 14: In Spain, first issue of the Disney comics magazine Don Miki (Edibelsa)
- October 24: Stefi (Stefania Morandini), by Grazia Nidasio, younger sister of Valentina Mela Verde, makes her debut on Il corriere dei piccoli.
- October 31: on Il giornalino, first episode of Tiki il ragazzo guerriero (Tiki warrior boy) by Giancarlo Berardi and Ivo Milazzo; the series, also if published in a magazine for the young ones, deals an adult topic as the genocide of the Indigenous people in Brazil.
- October: The first issue of the British comics magazine Captain Britain Weekly is published, featuring the debut of Chris Claremont and Herb Trimpe's Captain Britain.
- October: The final issue of the British comics magazine Valiant is published.
- Il Corriere dei ragazzi (the Corriere della sera’s supplement for teenagers) is renamed Corrier Boy and changes the editorial formula radically, with more articles and fewer comics. The new trend will lead to the qualitative decline and the closure of the magazine.
- The first episode of On the false earths, by Pierre Christin and Jean-Claude Mezieres, appears in Pilote.

=== November ===
- November 22: The first episode of Cathy Guisewite's Cathy makes its debut in papers.
- November 29 : in Pif Gadget, début of the historical series Taranis, fis de la Gaule by Victor Mora and Raffaele Carlo, similar to Asterix but in dramatic key.
- The final issue of the Belgian comics magazine Samedi-Jeunesse is published.
- Marvel cancels 6 ongoing titles: Amazing Adventures (vol. 2), Chamber of Chills, Jungle Action, Marvel Feature, Skull the Slayer, and the Curtis Magazines title Unknown Worlds of Science Fiction.
- With issue #44, DC revives Teen Titans vol. 1, which began in 1966 and stopped publishing in 1973.
- Sergio Bonelli publishes the collection Un uomo un avventura (A man, an adventure), which introduces the self-contained graphic novel in Italy. The first issue is The man of Khartoum by Sergio Toppi, followed next month by The man of Zululand by Gino d’Antonio. In the subsequent years, all the most important Italian cartoonists (from Pratt to Bonvi, from Crepax to Manara) give their contribution to the series.
- Sandopaper e la perla di Labuan (Sandoduck and the pearl of Labuan), by Michele Gazzari and Giovan Battista Carpi, parody of Emilio Salgari's The tigers of Mompracem, with Donald Duck as Sandokan, appears on Topolino.

=== December ===
- December 2: The final episode of Gommaar Timmermans' long-running children's comic Fideel de Fluwelen Ridder is published.
- Marvel Comics launches its third ongoing Spider-Man series, Peter Parker, The Spectacular Spider-Man.
- The first episode of Colombo, tragedia di un bighellone (Colombo, a dallier's tragedy), by Francesco Tullio Altan, appears on the Italian magazine Linus. The comic mocks Christopher Columbus as a greedy and vulgar adventurer and a pedophile.
- Hans G. Kresse and Lo Hartog van Banda receive the Stripschapprijs.

== Births ==
=== July ===
- July 12: Tuono Pettinato, Italian comics writer and illustrator (Garibaldi. Resoconto veritiero delle sue valorose impresse, a uso delle giovini menti), (d. 2021).

== Deaths ==
=== January ===
- January 21: Jacques Acar, French comics writer (Marc Franval, Tounga, Corentin, Strapontin) dies at age 38.
- January 22: Fletcher Hanks, American comics artist (Tabu, Wizard of the Jungle, Big Red McLane, Stardust the Super Wizard, Space Smith, Fantomah, Mystery Woman of the Jungle), dies at age 88, from hypothermia.
- January 26: Fred Meagher, American comics artist (drew various western comics), dies at age 73.
- January 30: William Juhre, American illustrator and comics artist (continued Tarzan, assisted on Buck Rogers, Flash Gordon and Apple Mary), dies at age 72.

=== February ===
- February 27: Lieuwe Brolsma, Dutch novelist and comics writer (scripted Kopkewoartel, drawn by Nico Oeloff), dies at age 63.

=== March ===
- March 2: Willy Murphy, American comics artist (Flamed-Out Funnies), dies of pneumonia at around age 38.
- March 8: Romer Zane Grey, American animator and comics writer (King of the Royal Mounted), dies at age 66.
- March 19: Emilio Freixas, Spanish comics artist and illustrator (El Capitàn Misterio), dies at age 76.
- March 24: E.H. Shepard, British illustrator and cartoonist (The Wind in the Willows, Winnie the Pooh, Punch), dies at age 96.

=== April ===
- April 1: Max Ernst, German painter, sculptor, graphic artist, poet and comics artist (Une Semaine de Bonté), dies at age 84.
- April 9: Emilio Boix, Spanish comics artist, dies at age 67.
- April 11: Frank Roberge, American comics artist (Noodnik, Mr. Fitz's Flats), dies at age 59.

=== May ===
- May: Cecil Jensen, American cartoonist and comics artist (Little Debbie), dies at age 74.

=== June ===
- June 5: Henk Backer, Dutch comics artist (Yoebje en Achmed, Tripje en Liezebertha), dies at age 77.
- June 19: Mike Arens, American animator and comics artist (Disney comics, continued Scamp), dies at age 60.
- June 21: Albert Dubout, French illustrator, caricaturist, sculptor, cartoonist and comics artist, dies at age 71.
- June 25: Mike Hubbard, Irish-British comics artist (Jane Bond, Secret Agent, continued Jane), dies at age 74.

=== July ===
- July 5: Frank Bellamy, British comics artist (Fraser of Africa, Heros the Spartan, Garth, continued Dan Dare), dies at age 59.

=== September ===
- September 6: Hans Ducro, Dutch comics artist (created the spin-off comic Sjors en de Verschrikkelijke Sneeuwman), dies at age 52.

=== October ===
- October 8: Ed Verdier, American comics artist (Little Annie Rooney), dies at age 79.

=== November ===
- November 6: Guus Hens, Dutch painter, illustrator and comics artist (Jim en Sim, Professor Bertini), dies at age 68.

=== December ===
- December 5: Tack Knight, American animator and comics artist (My Big Brudder, Baby Sister, Li'l Folks), dies at age 81.
- December 6: Pierre Donga, aka Pierre Duffourc, French comics artist and illustrator, dies at age 68.
- December 27: André Daix, French animator and comics artist (Professeur Nimbus), dies at age 75.

=== Specific date unknown ===
- Gérard Dorville, French comics artist (Alfred, Auguste et Popaul), dies at age 42 or 43.
- Clyde Lewis, American comics artist (Hold Everything, Herky, Snickeroos (Pvt. Buck)), dies at age 65/75 or 66/76.
- Jack Monk, British comics artist (Buck Ryan), dies at age 71 or 72.
- Tom Schroeder, American comics artist (Adam and Steve), dies at age 90 or 91.
- George Storm, American comics artist (Bobby Thatcher), dies at age 82 or 83.

== Conventions ==
- Lancaster Comic Art Convention (Lancaster, Pennsylvania) — produced by Chuck Miller and Charlie Roberts
- Pittcon '76 (Pittsburgh, Pennsylvania)
- January: Cincinnati Comic Convention (Netherland Hilton, Cincinnati, Ohio) — 2nd annual show; guests include Frank Brunner, Steve Gerber, Mary Skrenes, and Martin Pasko
- January 3: Creation Convention (Commodore Hotel, New York City) — a highlight of the convention was the availability for purchase of copies of the landmark $2 DC-Marvel collaboration Superman vs. The Amazing Spider-Man treasury-sized comic (which, according to official publication records, was issued the previous day)
- February 27–29: Super DC Con '76 (Americana Hotel, New York City) — organized by Phil Seuling to celebrate Superman's birthday; guests include Jerry Siegel, Joe Shuster, and Julius Schwartz
- March 19–21: Comics 101 (Mount Royal Hotel, London, England) — organized by Denis Gifford to celebrate the 101st year of British comics; guests include John M. Burns, Ron Embleton, Don Lawrence, Frank Hampson, Alan Class, Mick Anglo, Stanley White, and Steve Dowling; presentation of the Ally Sloper Awards
- April: Mid-America Comic Convention (Holiday Inn North, Cincinnati, Ohio) — 2nd annual show
- April 23–25: Marvel-Con '76 (Hotel Commodore, New York) — 2nd annual show; guests include Stan Lee, Jack Kirby, Roy Thomas, and John Buscema
- April 30 – May 2: Underground '76 (Pauley Ballroom, University of California, Berkeley, Berkeley, California) — another iteration of Berkeleycon (first held in 1973), organized by Clay Geerdes/Comix World
- Summer: Atlanta Fantasy Fair (Marriott Downtown, Atlanta, Georgia) — official guests include Frank Brunner, Steve Gerber, Dick Giordano, and Kenneth Smith
- June 11–14: D-Con (Sheraton Hotel, Dallas, Texas)
- June 17–20: Houstoncon '76/Star Trek '76 (Royal Coach Inn, Houston, Texas) — guests include George Takei, Grace Lee Whitney, and Johnny Weissmuller
- July 16–18: Omnicon (Convention Center Ramada Inn, Louisville, Kentucky) — produced by Don Rosa and James Van Hise; guests include Frank Brunner, DeForest Kelley, and Michael Kaluta.
- July 2–6: Comic Art Convention (McAlpin Hotel, 34th Street and Broadway, New York City)
- July 2–4: Konvention of Alternative Komix "KAK 76" (The Arts Lab, Tower Street, Birmingham, England) — underground comix convention produced by the Birmingham Arts Lab (Paul Fisher and Hunt Emerson); guests include Chris Welch, Steve Bell, Bryan Talbot, Mike Higgs, and Suzy Varty
- July 21–25: San Diego Comic-Con (El Cortez Hotel, San Diego, California) — 3,000+ attendees, special guests include Sergio Aragonés, Mel Blanc, Milton Caniff, Rick Griffin, Dale Messick, Joe Shuster, Noel Sickles, Don Thompson, Maggie Thompson
- August 6–8: Chicago Comicon (Playboy Towers Hotel, Chicago, Illinois) — produced by Joe Sarno and Mike Gold. Special guests: Stan Lee, Jenette Kahn, Harvey Kurtzman, Mike Grell, and Tim Conrad
- August 21–22: Comicon '76 (British Comic Art Convention) (Regent Centre Hotel, London, England) — organized by Rob Barrow; guests include Paul Neary and Tony Weare; convention booklet features artwork by Dave Gibbons, John Bolton, Kevin O'Neill, Paul Neary, Brian Bolland, Ron Embleton, John M. Burns, Brian Lewis, Martin Asbury, Frank Hampson, John Romita, Sr., Bryan Talbot, and Hunt Emerson
- September 3–5: Spectrum Con 76 (Dunffey's Royal Coach Inn, Sugarland, Texas) — guests include Jim Steranko and Pat Boyette
- September 12: Comic Rama Con (Bergenfield/Dumont Jewish Center, Bergenfield, New Jersey) — guests include Jerry Iger
- September 18–19: OrlandoCon '76 (International Inn, Orlando, Florida) — guests include Jack Davis, Harvey Kurtzman, and Floyd Gottfredson
- October: Detroit Triple Fan Fair (Detroit, Michigan) — 11th edition of the fair; guests include Joe Kubert, John G. Fuller, and Mike Nasser
- October 1–3: Fourth Dimension Con (Kent State University, Kent, Ohio) — guests include Frederik Pohl, Will Eisner, Val Mayerik, Paul Gulacy, and Harlan Ellison
- October 22–24: Newcon '76 (New England Comic Art Convention) (Howard Johnson's 57 Hotel, Boston, Massachusetts) — guests include Jim Steranko, Michael Kaluta, Dick Giordano, Harvey Kurtzman, Gil Kane, Carl Barks, and John Stanley
- October 30–November 4: Salone Internazionale dei Comics a.k.a. "Lucca 12" (Lucca, Italy)
- November 20–21: Sonja-Con (Travel Lodge, Mt. Laurel, New Jersey) — two-day convention dedicated to Red Sonja, produced by Delaware Valley Comic Art Convention; official guests include Frank Thorne, Dave Cockrum, Gene Colan, Joe Staton, Dick Giordano, and Bob Layton
- November 26–28: Big Comicon Creation Convention (Statler Hilton Hotel, New York City) — 4,500 attendees; official guests include Ralph Bakshi, Jenette Kahn, Michael Kaluta, Jeff Jones, Gil Kane, Steve Gerber, Nicola Cuti, Bob Smith, Alex Niño, Martin Pasko, Marv Wolfman, Jim Steranko, Howard Chaykin, Joe Staton, Jerry Iger, and Len Wein

== Awards ==
=== Eagle Awards ===
Two British comics fans, Mike Conroy and Richard Burton, create the Eagle Awards, named after the long-running Brish comic title Eagle. The first set of awards is presented in 1977 at Comicon '77 for comics published in 1976:

- Favourite Comic Book (Dramatic): Uncanny X-Men
- Favourite Comic Magazine (Dramatic): Savage Sword of Conan
- Favourite Team: Uncanny X-Men
- Favourite Comic Book (Humor): Howard the Duck, by Steve Gerber'
- Favourite New Comic: Howard the Duck, by Steve Gerber'
- Favourite Single Comic Book Story: "Four Feathers of Death! : or Enter the Duck," Howard the Duck #3, by Steve Gerber and John Buscema'
- Favourite Continued Comic Story: Master of Kung Fu #48–51 by Doug Moench and Paul Gulacy
- Favourite Comic Book Character: Conan the Barbarian'
- Favourite Comicbook Writer: Roy Thomas
- Favourite Comics Writer (UK): Chris Claremont'
- Favourite UK Title: House of Hammer
- Roll of Honor: Stan Lee

== First issues by title ==
=== DC Comics ===
Blitzkrieg

Release: January/February. Writer: Robert Kanigher. Artist: Ric Estrada.

DC Super Stars: mostly reprint title.

Release: March. Editor: E. Nelson Bridwell.

Four Star Spectacular: reprint title.

Release: March/April. Editor: E. Nelson Bridwell.

Freedom Fighters

Release: March/April. Writers: Gerry Conway and Martin Pasko. Artists: Ric Estrada and Mike Royer.

Isis

Release: October /November Writer: Dennis O'Neil. Artists: Ric Estrada and Wally Wood.

Karate Kid

Release: March/April. Writers: Paul Levitz. Artists: Ric Estrada and Joe Staton.

Kobra

Release: February/March. Writers: Jack Kirby, Steve Sherman, and Martin Pasko. Artists: Jack Kirby and Pablo Marcos.

Ragman

Release: August/September. Writers: Bob Kanigher. Artists: Joe Kubert and the Redondo Studio.

Secret Society of Super Villains

Release: May/June. Writers: Gerry Conway. Artists: Pablo Marcos and Bob Smith.

Starfire

Release: August. Writer: David Michelinie. Artist: Mike Vosburg.

Super Friends

Release: November. Writer: E. Nelson Bridwell. Artists: Ric Estrada, Joe Orlando, and Vince Colletta.

The Warlord

Release: January/February. Writer/Artist: Mike Grell.

Welcome Back, Kotter

Release: November. Writer: Elliot Maggin. Artists: Jack Sparling and Bob Oksner.

=== Marvel Comics ===
2001: A Space Odyssey

Release: December. Writer: Jack Kirby. Artists: Jack Kirby and Mike Royer.

Captain Britain Weekly

Release: October 13 by Marvel UK. Editor: Larry Lieber.

Eternals

Release: July. Writer: Jack Kirby. Artists: Jack Kirby and John Verpoorten.

Haunt of Horror

Release: May by Curtis Magazines. Editor: Roy Thomas.

Howard the Duck

Release: January. Writer: Steve Gerber. Artists: Frank Brunner and Steve Leialoha.

Marvel Classics Comics

Release: Jan. Editor: Vincent Fago.

Nova

Release: September. Writers: Marv Wolfman. Artists: John Buscema and Joe Sinnott.

Omega the Unknown

Release: March. Writers: Mary Skrenes and Steve Gerber. Artist: Jim Mooney.

Peter Parker, The Spectacular Spider-Man

Release: December. Writer: Gerry Conway. Artists: Sal Buscema, Mike Esposito, and Dave Hunt.

=== Other publishers ===
Action

Release: February 14 by IPC Magazines. Editor: Pat Mills.

Akim

Release: June. Editor: Edizioni Altamira (Sergio Bonelli)

American Splendor

Release: by Harvey Pekar. Writer: Harvey Pekar.

Bullet

Release: February by D. C. Thomson & Co. Ltd.

Cole Black Comix
Release by Rocky Hartberg Productions Writer and Artist: Rocky Hartberg

LaLa

Release: July by Hakusensha

Nick Carter

Release: March.by Edizioni Cenisio (Italy).

Storm

Release: Big Balloon (Dutch). Artist: Don Lawrence.

Super Almanacco Paperino

Release: December by Mondadori. Reprint of classic Donald Duck's stories.

Twisted Sisters

Release: June by Last Gasp. Writers/Artists: Aline Kominsky & Diane Noomin.

== Canceled titles ==
=== Charlton Comics ===
- Doomsday + 1, with issue #6 (May) — revived in 1978 as a reprint title
- Midnight Tales, with issue #18 (May)

=== DC Comics ===
- 1st Issue Special, with issue #13 (April)
- Beowulf, Dragon Slayer, with issue #6 (March)
- Blitzkrieg, with issue #5 (September /October)
- The Joker, with issue #9 (September /October)
- Kong the Untamed, with issue #5 (February/March)
- Man-Bat, with issue #2 (February/March)
- Phantom Stranger vol. 2, with issue #41 (February/March)
- Plop!, with issue #24 (November /December)
- Swamp Thing, with issue #24 (August /September)
- Tarzan Family, with issue #66 (November /December)
- Tor, with issue #6 (March/April)

=== Gold Key Comics ===
- Golden Comics Digest, with issue #48 (January)
- Walt Disney Comics Digest, with issue #57 (February)

=== Harvey Comics ===
- Little Dot, with issue #164 (April)
- Little Lotta, with issue #120 (May)
- Playful Little Audrey, with issue #121 (April)

=== Marvel Comics ===
- Amazing Adventures vol. 2, with issue #39, Marvel cancels the anthology title (November)
- Astonishing Tales, with issue #36 (July)
- Chamber of Chills, with issue #25 (November)
- Jungle Action, with issue #24 (November)
- Marvel Feature vol. 2, with issue #7 (November)
- Skull the Slayer, with issue #8 (November)
- Unknown Worlds of Science Fiction, with issue #6 (Curtis Magazines, November)

=== Other publishers ===
- Arcade, with issue #7 (The Print Mint, Fall)

== Initial appearance by character name ==
=== DC Comics ===
- Ace of Spades, in The Joker #5 (February)
- Atomic Skull (Albert Michael), in Superman #303 (September)
- Black Spider, in Detective Comics #463 (September)
- Blackrock, in Action Comics #458 (April)
- Bumblebee (Karen Beecher), in Teen Titans #45 (December)
- Calculator, in Detective Comics #463 (September)
- Captain Stingaree, in Detective Comics #460 (June)
- Codename: Assassin, in 1st Issue Special #11 (February)
- Deborah Camille Darnell, in Secret Society of Super Villains #1 (May/June)
- Duela Dent, in Batman Family #6 (July/August)
- Grimbor the Chainsman, in Superboy and the Legion of Super-Heroes #221 (November)
- Isis, in Isis #1 (October /November)
- Earthman, in Superboy and the Legion of Super-Heroes #218 (July)
- Kobra, in Kobra #1 (February)
- Laurel Kent, in Superboy #217 (June)
- Machiste, in The Warlord #2 (March)
- Paul Kirk III in Secret Society of Super-Villains #1 (June)
- Outsiders, in 1st Issue Special #10 (January)
- Power Girl, in All Star Comics #58 (January/February)
- Ragman, in Ragman #1 (August /September)
- Revenger, in Karate Kid #3 (August)
- Starfire, in Starfire #1 (August)
- Starman (Mikaal Tomas), in 1st Issue Special #12 (March)
- Skull, in Superman #301 (July)
- Leslie Thompkins, in Detective Comics #457 (March)
- Tyroc, in Superboy and the Legion of Super-Heroes #216 (April)
- Wendy, Marvin and Wonder Dog, in Super Friends #1 (November)

=== Marvel Comics ===
- Amphibian, in Avengers #145 (March)
- Aron, in Captain Marvel #39 (July)
- Black Talon (Samuel Barone), in Avengers #152 (October)
- Black Tom Cassidy, in Uncanny X-Men #101 (October)
- Blizzard (Gregor Shapanka), in Iron Man #86 (May)
- Betsy Braddock, in Captain Britain Weekly #8 (December)
- Jamie Braddock, in Captain Britain Weekly #9 (December)
- Dmitri Bukharin, in Iron Man #109 (April)
- Bullseye, in Daredevil #131 (March)
- Captain Britain, in Captain Britain Weekly #1 (October 13)
- Captain Ultra, in Fantastic Four #177 (December)
- Celestials
  - Arishem the Judge, in The Eternals #2 (August)
  - Exitar the Exterminator, in Thor #387 (July)
  - Gammenon the Gatherer, in The Eternals #4 (October)
- Condor, in Nova #2 (October)
- Corruptor, in Nova #4 in (December)
- Darkstar, in Champions #7 (August)
- Jean DeWolff, in Marvel Team-Up #48 (August)
- The Eternals, in The Eternals #1 (July)
  - Ajak, in The Eternals #2 (August)
  - Domo, in The Eternals #5 (November)
  - Ikaris, in The Eternals #1 (July)
  - Makkari, in The Eternals #1 (July)
  - Sersi, in The Eternals #3 (September)
  - Thena, in The Eternals #5 (November)
  - Zuras, in The Eternals #5 (November)
- Guardsman (Michael O'Brien), in Iron Man #82 (January)
- Hellcat, in The Avengers #144 (February)
- Human Fly (Richard Deacon), in The Amazing Spider-Man Annual #10
- Hurricane (Albert Potter), in Captain Britain #3 (October 27)
- Jigsaw, in The Amazing Spider-Man #162 (November)
- Shen Kuei, in Master of Kung Fu #38 (March)
- Mirage, in The Amazing Spider-Man #156 (May)
- Lilandra Neramani, in X-Men #97 (February)
- Nova, in Nova #1 (September)
- Rampage, in Champions #5 (April)
- Amanda Sefton, in Uncanny X-Men #98 (April)
- Star-Lord, in Marvel Preview #4 (January)

=== Other publishers ===
- Storm (Don Lawrence), in Storm
