= Guardians of the Galaxy (New Guard) =

Fictional spacefaring superhero team

Group publication information
- Publisher: Marvel Comics
- First appearance: Guardians of the Galaxy Vol. 4 #1 (October 2015)
- Created by: Brian Michael Bendis (writer); Valerio Schiti (writer)

In-story information
- Base(s): Knowhere
- Member(s): Former members Agent Venom; Angela; Ant-Man; Bug; Captain Marvel; Cosmo; Drax the Destroyer; Jack Flag; Gamora; Groot; Iron Man; Kitty Pryde; Major Victory; Mantis; Moondragon; Quasar; Rocket Raccoon; Star-Lord; Thing; Adam Warlock

Roster
- See: List of Guardians of the Galaxy members

Guardians of the Galaxy

Series publication information
- Schedule: Monthly
- Format: Ongoing series
- Genre: Superhero
- Publication date: (Volume 4); October 2015 – April 2017 () [[ in comics|]] – present
- Number of issues: Volume 4; 19
- Creator(s): Brian Michael Bendis (writer); Valerio Schiti (writer)

Collected editions
- Grounded: ISBN 978-1302906702

The Guardians of the Galaxy are a fictional spacefaring superhero team appearing in American comic books published by Marvel Comics. Brian Michael Bendis and Valerio Schiti formed this new version of the team with an initial roster of Rocket Raccoon, Kitty Pryde, Thing, Drax the Destroyer, Agent Venom, and Groot. However, Star-Lord and Gamora eventually re-joined the team, and so did Angela. This Guardians team first appeared in "Guardians of the Galaxy" Vol. 4 #1 (October 2015).

== Publication history ==
The second volume of the title was published in May 2008, written by Dan Abnett and Andy Lanning and featured a new team of characters from the "Annihilation: Conquest" storyline.

Abnett and Lanning's work on the Annihilation: Conquest story laid the foundation for the new Guardians of the Galaxy book that they had been wanting to launch for some time. Editor Bill Rosemann, who had also edited Annihilation: Conquest, provided more background: "As the planning of Annihilation: Conquest came together, it occurred to us that, if things went well, there would be a group of characters left standing who would make for a very interesting and fun team." It also provided the motivation the team would need, as "on the heels of two back-to-back wars, they're out to prevent any new Annihilation-size disasters from erupting."

The title ran parallel with Nova vol. 4, which was also written by Abnett and Lanning. The two crossed over in the storylines "War of Kings" and "Realm of Kings". Paul Pelletier pencilled the first seven issues. Brad Walker and Wes Craig alternated pencilling tasks from #8 to #25.

The book was cancelled in April 2010 with issue 25. Some plot threads were concluded in The Thanos Imperative 1–6 and its two one-shots (May 2010 – Jan 2011).

The team appeared reassembled in Avengers Assemble #4–8 (June–October 2012).

The Guardians of the Galaxy appeared in a new series for Marvel NOW! starting with issue 0.1 written by Brian Michael Bendis and drawn by Steve McNiven. In addition to the previous Guardians, Iron Man also joins the team. Later issues of the series saw Angela, Agent Venom, and Captain Marvel join. With the success of the film adaptation, spinoff books were also created as solo titles featuring Star-Lord, Rocket Raccoon, and Groot.

Guardians of the Galaxy was relaunched as part of the All-New, All-Different Marvel initiative with Brian Michael Bendis and Valerio Schiti returning as writer and artist respectively. The series sees Peter Quill and Gamora leaving the team, and Rocket becoming the new team's self-appointed leader, also two new characters were added to the team. Kitty Pryde (taking up the mantle of Star-Lord) and the Thing. As a part of the All-New, All-Different Marvel initiative, all of the characters that were part of the feature film cast would star in their own solo series. Star-Lord appeared in a solo series written by Sam Humphries, while Rocket Raccoon and Groot starred in a series written by Skottie Young. and Drax and Gamora starred in solo series written by UFC fighter CM Punk, and Nicole Perlman, respectively.

== Team history ==
In the aftermath of the Phalanx invasion of the Kree, Star-Lord decides to form a team of interstellar heroes that will be proactive in protecting the galaxy, rather than reacting to crises as they happen. To this end, he recruits Adam Warlock, Drax the Destroyer, Gamora, Phyla-Vell (the new Quasar), Rocket Raccoon, and Groot, with Mantis as support staff. On the recommendation of their ally, Nova, the group establishes a base of operations on the space station Knowhere, which possesses a teleportation system with near-universal range. An intelligent, telepathic dog named Cosmo the Spacedog is Knowhere's chief of security and works closely with the new team. After a confrontation with the Universal Church of Truth, the team meets a semi-amnesiac man who identifies himself as Vance Astro - Major Victory of the original Guardians of the Galaxy. Astro's declaration inspires the as-yet-unnamed team to adopt the "Guardians of the Galaxy" name for their own. When the team learns Star-Lord directed Mantis to telepathically coerce the heroes into joining the team, they disband.

Rocket Raccoon decides to continue Star-Lord's mission and starts a search for the missing members. His new team includes Bug, Mantis, Major Victory, and Groot, who is fully regrown.

Meanwhile, Star-Lord was banished to the Negative Zone by Ronan the Accuser for his actions during the Phalanx's attempted conquest of the Kree empire. There, he finds himself in the middle of Blastaar's fight to break into Prison 42 and use its portal to invade Earth. Star-Lord allies with Jack Flag to defend the prison and contact the other Guardians for rescue. Rocket's new team successfully brings both of them back, and Flag becomes a Guardian.

Elsewhere, Drax and Phyla begin looking for Cammi, but on their search they talk to a seer who tells them about an oncoming war. Phyla is able to wake Moondragon from the dead, but loses her Quantum Bands in the process. The consequence for Phyla is that she is now the new avatar of death. They go back to Knowhere and do not follow up on the search for Cammi.

=== Marvel NOW! ===
After Star-Lord's father J'son visits him in a bar to tell him that it is forbidden for any alien species to visit Earth, Iron Man is attacked by Badoon appearing to attack Earth. The Guardians and their newest member Iron Man defeat the ship; however, London is still attacked. The Guardians defend London and finish off the horde of Badoon but learn that, for violating the "Earth-is-off-limits" rule (the Spartax Earth Directive), they are to be placed under arrest by the King of Spartax. The Guardians manage to escape with the help of Groot, who had recently regrown after being destroyed by a Badoon ship's explosion. The team includes Star-Lord, Drax the Destroyer, Gamora, Groot, Rocket Raccoon, and Tony Stark. In April 2013, it was announced that Image Comics character Angela (Spawn) would be incorporated into the Marvel Comics universe following a legal battle between the character's creators Neil Gaiman and Todd McFarlane, which ended with Gaiman giving Marvel Comics the rights to Angela. After appearing in the "Age of Ultron" storyline, Angela joined the Guardians that November. Captain Marvel and Agent Venom also subsequently joined the team.

During the "Secret Wars" storyline, the Guardians of the Galaxy take part in the incursion between Earth-616 and Earth-1610. During the incursion, Rocket Raccoon and Groot are killed by the Children of Tomorrow, Star-Lord is teleported away trying to come up with a back-up plan, and Gamora and Drax the Destroyer are surrounded and confused by the corpses of their comrades. During the subsequent conflict with the Beyonder-empowered Doom, Star-Lord is one of the survivors of the previous universe, piloting the 616 and Ultimate versions of Mister Fantastic in to mount a final assault on Doom's castle, and revealing that he kept a twig from Groot in his pocket until the right moment.

During the "Secret Empire" storyline, the Guardians of the Galaxy assist Captain Marvel, the Ultimates, the Alpha Flight Space Program, Hyperion, and Quasar into fighting the Chitauri wave. Captain America, who was brainwashed into being a Hydra sleeper agent by Red Skull's clone using the powers of Kobik, activates the Planetary Defense Shield trapping them outside of Earth.

== Collected editions ==
=== Guardians Team-Up ===
Title	Material collected	Pages	Publication date	ISBN
Guardians Team-Up Vol. 1: Guardians Assemble	Guardians Team-Up #1-5, Tails of Pet-Avengers #1	144 pages	November 2015	978-0785197140
Guardians Team-Up Vol. 2: Unlikely Story	Guardians Team-Up #6-10, Deadpool Team-Up #883	136 pages	February 2016	978-0785199113

=== "Secret Wars" ===
Title	Material collected	Pages	Publication date	ISBN
Guardians of Knowhere	Guardians of Knowhere #1-4 and New Avengers: Illuminati (2007) #3	120 pages	December 2015	978-0785198444
Star-Lord & Kitty Pride	Star-Lord & Kitty Pride #1-3, Generation Next #1 and Guardians of the Galaxy & X-Men: The Black Vortex Omega	128 pages	December 2015	978-0785198437

=== Volume 4 ===
Title	Material collected	Pages	Publication date	ISBN
Guardians of the Galaxy: New Guard Vol. 1: Emperor Quill	Guardians of the Galaxy Vol. 4 #1-5	112 pages	May 2016	978-0785195184
Guardians of the Galaxy: New Guard Vol. 2: Wanted	Guardians of the Galaxy Vol. 4 #6-10	136 pages	November 2016	978-0785195191
Guardians of the Galaxy: New Guard Vol. 3: Civil War II	Guardians of the Galaxy Vol. 4 #11-14	112 pages	February 2017	978-1302903015
Guardians of the Galaxy: New Guard Vol. 4: Grounded	Guardians of the Galaxy Vol. 4 #15-19	136 pages	October 2017	978-1302906702

=== Guardians of Infinity ===
Title	Material collected	Pages	Publication date	ISBN
Guardians of the Galaxy: Guardians of Infinity	Guardians of Infinity #1-8 (A stories)	136 pages	August 2016	978-0785195870
Guardians of the Galaxy: Tales of the Cosmos	Guardians of Infinity #1-8 (B stories)	136 pages	August 2016	978-0785195887

== Other versions ==
=== 1602 ===
In the Secret Wars storyline, the Guardians of the Galaxy have a counterpart named the Gardiner's Men in the domain of King James' England, based on the Marvel 1602 reality. They are a troupe of performers consisting of Madam Gomorrah (Gamora), Peadar O'Cuill (Star-Lord), Arthur Dubhghlas (Drax), Goodman Root (Groot), and Aroughcun (Rocket Raccoon).
