= Terrible Trio (Marvel Comics) =

Fictional comic book group

Publication information
- Publisher: Marvel Comics
- First appearance: Fantastic Four #23 (1964)
- Created by: Stan Lee; Jack Kirby

In-story information
- Member(s): See membership

The Terrible Trio is the name of two supervillain teams appearing in American comic books published by Marvel Comics.

== Publication history ==
Created by Stan Lee and Jack Kirby, the first Terrible Trio first appeared in Fantastic Four #23 (1964). They made several appearances in the 1960s and then one appearance in the late 1970s in Marvel Two-in-One #60.

== Fictional team history ==
=== First Terrible Trio ===
Barnaby "Bull" Brogin, "Handsome" Harry Phillips, and Yogi Dakor are three career criminals brought together by Doctor Doom to help him destroy the Fantastic Four. He pays their bail using a robot and gives each of them superpowers with his XZ-12 Machine, multiplying their natural abilities by a dozen. The trio capture the Fantastic Four: Phillips tracks the Invisible Girl and gases her, Dakor pretends to be delivering a car to the Human Torch, but reveals it is fireproof when he traps him inside and fills it with gas, and Bull uses a cosmic ray gun to briefly turn the Thing to his human form and knocks him out. Doom captures Mister Fantastic with the assistance of a robotic version of the Thing, trapping Mister Fantastic in a glass box. Doom sends the Trio to another dimension until he again needs their services. The Fantastic Four defeat Doom, sending him into space, and the trio is returned to Earth as the power needed to keep them was lessened.

The trio spend the better part of a decade in prison before Dakor gains the ability to project their minds into inanimate objects. They possess Alicia Masters' statues and battle the Thing. The Thing is initially unwilling to damage the statues until Alicia told him it is fine, who defeats them with the help of the Impossible Man.

Years later, the Terrible Trio are shown to have allied with Latverian terrorists. They are apprehended by the Thunderbolts during an arms deal, then badly beaten by Penance and arrested for violating the Superhuman Registration Act.

=== Second Terrible Trio ===
The second Terrible consists of Condor, Diamondhead, and Powerhouse. They first come together when Condor and Diamondhead break into the building that Powerhouse was held in following his defeat at the hands of Nova. They manage to beat Nova easily and take him to Condor's secret hideout. Condor proceeds to erase Nova's memories and implant an evil spirit in him. As an unwilling accomplice to the Terrible Trio, Nova helps them raid an Air Force warehouse before shaking off the mind control. The Terrible Trio use the stolen technology to fight Sphinx and his forces. Nova is trapped in a bubble by Condor, but escapes and takes down Powerhouse.

== Membership ==
=== First version membership ===
- Barnaby "Bull" Brogin - A racketeer who has strength twelve times a normal man. He was originally arrested for beating up six husky longshoreman who refused to join his protection racket.
- "Handsome" Harry Phillips - A skilled con artist who has increased hearing. He used his good looks to fool people until he was arrested.
- Dakor - A mystic who is completely fireproof and has other lesser abilities. He was originally arrested for trying to steal the payroll from the circus that he originally worked at. Dakor later develops the ability to possess inanimate objects, a power he can share with Brogin and Phillips, as well as possessing a levitating rope and a magic carpet.

=== Second version membership ===
- Condor - Leader. A member of the Bird-People offshoot of the Inhumans who possesses flight, enhanced strength, enhanced agility, and enhanced reflexes.
- Diamondhead - A supervillain with a diamond body that grants him super-strength and invulnerability.
- Powerhouse - A Xandarian with super-strength and energy-siphoning abilities.
