= Orient Express (magazine) =

Italian comic magazine

- Cover of the last issue of Orient Express featuring Franco Saudelli's Porfiri
- Categories: Comic magazine
- Frequency: Monthly
- Founded: June 1982
- Final issue: March 1985
- Country: Italy
- Based in: Milan
- Language: Italian

Orient Express was a monthly comic magazine published in Italy from 1982 to 1985.

== History and profile ==
Orient Express was founded in 1982 by Luigi Bernardi and intended to offer to its adult audience only high quality stories by Italian cartoonists. The first issue appeared in June 1982. The magazine was published monthly and featured unreleased stories of both well-known and unpublished characters. The magazine had its headquarters in Bologna until 1984 when it moved to Milan.

Series published by the magazine include Lo Sconosciuto and I Briganti by Magnus, Ken Parker by Giancarlo Berardi and Ivo Milazzo, Martin Mystère by Alfredo Castelli and Giancarlo Alessandrini, Max Fridman by Vittorio Giardino, Johnny Focus by Attilio Micheluzzi, Stella Noris by Lorena Canossa and Roberto Baldazzini, Big Sleeping by Daniele Panebarco.

A collection of the magazine's best stories, Orient Express Collezione, was published between June 1985 and February 1986.

== See also ==
- List of magazines published in Italy
