= Four-Star Spectacular =

Anthology comic book series published by the DC Comics in the mid-1970s

- Cover of Four-Star Spectacular #1 (Mar/Apr 1976), art by Ernie Chan.

Publication information
- Publisher: DC Comics
- Schedule: Bi-monthly
- Format: Standard
- Publication date: March/April 1976 – January/February 1977
- No. of issues: 6
- Main character(s): Superboy; Wonder Woman
- Editor: E. Nelson Bridwell

Four-Star Spectacular was an anthology comic book series published by DC Comics in the mid-1970s. The series was edited by E. Nelson Bridwell and ran for six issues from March/April 1976 to January/February 1977. The books were in the "giant size" format and consisted mostly of superhero reprints, with some new material. A total of four characters from DC's roster of superheroes appeared in each issue — hence the title. Half of the title's issues, however, only featured three stories. Each issue featured a Superboy story, a Wonder Woman story, and at least one other story (usually a team-up story). All issues featured cover art by DC artist Ernie Chua.

== Issues ==
| Issue | Heroes | Date | Notes |
|---|---|---|---|
| 1 | Superboy, Hawkman, Wonder Woman, the Flash | March/April 1976 | 64-page giant; issue reprints from Adventure Comics #270 (Superboy, "The Stolen Identities"), Sensation Comics #17 (Wonder Woman, "The Talking Lion"), All-Flash Comics #22 (Flash, "The City of Shifting Sand"), Hawkman #7 (Hawkman, "Attack of the Crocodile-Men") |
| 2 | Superboy, Wonder Woman, Kid Flash, Elongated Man | May/June 1976 | 48-page giant; issue reprints stories from Superboy #102 (Superboy, "The Secret of Krypton's Scarlet Jungle"), Wonder Woman #107 (Wonder Woman "Gunslingers of Space"), Flash #130 (Kid Flash and Elongated Man, "Kid Flash Meets the Elongated Man") |
| 3 | Superboy, Wonder Woman, Supergirl, Green Lantern | July/August 1976 | 48-page giant; issue reprints stories from Wonder Woman #101 (Wonder Woman, "Undersea Trap"), Action Comics #358 (Supergirl and Superboy, "Superboy in Argo City"), Green Lantern #32 (Green Lantern, "Power Battery Peril"); plus a Superboy workshop activity page. |
| 4 | Wonder Woman, Superboy, Hawkman, Hawkgirl | September/October 1976 | 48-page giant; issue reprints stories from Sensation Comics #19 (Wonder Woman, "The Unbound Amazon"), Superboy #62 (Superboy "The Wildest Weather in the World"), Hawkman #7 (Hawkman and Hawkgirl, "Amazing Return of the I.Q. Gang") |
| 5 | Superboy, Vigilante, Green Arrow, Wonder Woman | November/December 1976 | 48-page giant; issue reprints stories from Adventure Comics #303 (Superboy, "The Man Who Hunted Superboy"), Wonder Woman #7 (Wonder Woman, "Demon of the Depths"), Adventure Comics #246 (Green Arrow, "The Rainbow Archer"), Action Comics #194 (Vigilante, "The Unlucky Horseshoe") |
| 6 | Wonder Woman, Superboy, Etta Candy, Blackhawk | January/February 1977 | 48-page giant; reprints stories from Wonder Woman #103 (Wonder Woman, "The Wonder Woman Album"), Wonder Woman #5 (Etta Candy, "The Toothache"), Superboy #118 (Superboy, "The War Between Superboy and Krypto"), Blackhawk #11 (The Blackhawks, "Valley of the Tiger Lady") |

== In other media ==
Four-Star Spectacular serves as inspiration for a self-titled episode of Batman: The Brave and the Bold. It is an anthology starring Adam Strange, the Flash, 'Mazing Man, and the Creature Commandos, with series protagonist Batman as a minor character.

== See also ==
- DC Super Stars
- DC Special Series
- DC Special
- List of DC Comics publications
