= Cosmo the Spacedog =

Marvel Comics character

Publication information
- Publisher: Marvel Comics
- First appearance: Nova vol. 4 #8 (Jan. 2008)
- Created by: Dan Abnett (writer); Andy Lanning (artist)

In-story information
- Alter ego: Cosmo
- Species: Golden Retriever–Labrador Retriever mix
- Place of origin: Earth
- Team affiliations: Guardians of the Galaxy; Knowhere Corps; Pet Avengers
- Abilities: Various psychic abilities

Cosmo the Space-dog (Russian: Космо, romanized: Kosmo) is a character appearing in American comic books published by Marvel Comics. Cosmo, a telepathic Soviet space dog, is the security chief of the space station Knowhere and a member of the Guardians of the Galaxy. The character was created by Dan Abnett and Andy Lanning as a reference and tribute to Laika, the first animal to orbit Earth, and first appeared in Nova vol. 4 #8 (Jan. 2008).

A female version of Cosmo the Spacedog appeared in a cameo role in the Marvel Cinematic Universe films Guardians of the Galaxy (2014) and Guardians of the Galaxy Vol. 2 (2017), as well as in the Disney+ animated series What If...? (2021). She is voiced by Maria Bakalova in The Guardians of the Galaxy Holiday Special (2022) and Guardians of the Galaxy Vol. 3 (2023).

== Fictional character biography ==
Cosmo was a Soviet space dog during the 1960s and was launched into Earth's orbit by the Soviet space program as part of an experiment. Cosmo was lost in space and mutated by exposure to cosmic rays, gaining psychic powers. Eventually, Cosmo landed on Knowhere, a city located within the severed head of a giant Celestial, and became Knowhere's security chief.

Nova meets Cosmo shortly after encountering Suspensor, who he kills in self-defense. Cosmo and Nova are ambushed by a group of zombies, including the surviving members of Suspensor's former team, the Luminals. The two determine that Abyss was responsible and seal him away.

Peter Quill's original Guardians of the Galaxy team operated out of Knowhere for some time, thus dragging Cosmo into many of their exploits. During one such adventure, Cosmo and the Guardians bounce around the time stream in an attempt to stop the Fault, a tear in the universe, from eliminating all of reality. During this adventure, Cosmo is de-aged into a puppy.

During The Thanos Imperative storyline, the corrupted beings of the Cancerverse invade Earth-616 through the Fault. The Guardians of the Galaxy allied with Thanos to stop Mar-Vell. During the battle, Phyla-Vell is killed and Adam Warlock, Drax, and Star-Lord are presumed dead. At Star-Lord's request, Cosmo gathers Silver Surfer, Gladiator, Beta Ray Bill, Quasar, and Ronan the Accuser to protect the universe together.

Cosmo is seen with several new Knowhere enforcement allies called the Knowhere Corps. They assist him in capturing a violence-loving gangster called Yotat.

== Powers and abilities ==
In addition to a dog's standard enhanced sense of hearing and smell, Cosmo has psionic abilities, including high-level telepathy and telekinesis. He has shown to be capable of creating defensive shields strong enough to deflect energy blasts, as well as project mind blasts of tremendous force. His exact power levels are unknown, but he has shown to be strong enough to take on a being such as Adam Warlock by himself, and powerful enough to unleash a telekinetic blast able to disable two separate teams of super-humans.

In addition to these abilities, Cosmo seems to have a considerably extended lifespan as well — especially for a dog since he has been around since the time of the Soviet Union.

== Other versions ==
=== Earth-97161 ===
An alternate universe version of Cosmo from Earth-97161 appears in Guardians Team-Up #5.

=== Ultimate Universe ===
An alternate universe version of Cosmo from Earth-6160 known as Cosmo Starstalker appears in the Ultimate Universe imprint. This version is female, originates from the 61st century, and sports a cybernetic leg.

== In other media ==
=== Television ===
- Cosmo the Spacedog appears in Guardians of the Galaxy (2015), voiced by James Arnold Taylor.
- An alternate reality, pirate-themed version of Cosmo makes a non-speaking appearance in the Ultimate Spider-Man episode "Return to the Spider-Verse".

=== Marvel Cinematic Universe ===
A gender-flipped version of Cosmo the Spacedog appears in media set in the Marvel Cinematic Universe, physically portrayed by dog actors Fred and Slate and voiced and motion-captured by Maria Bakalova.

- In Guardians of the Galaxy (2014), she is introduced as a prisoner of the Collector who witnesses the eponymous team arrive before being freed following an explosion caused by the Power Stone.
- Cosmo makes a cameo appearance in the end-credits scenes of Guardians of the Galaxy Vol. 2.
- An alternate timeline version of Cosmo appears in the What If...? episode "What If... T'Challa Became a Star-Lord?". After the Collector's slave, Carina, frees his captives, Cosmo joins the Ravagers in traveling to Earth.
- As of The Guardians of the Galaxy Holiday Special, Cosmo has exhibited psionic powers, become a member of the Guardians, and befriended Rocket.
- In Guardians of the Galaxy Vol. 3, Cosmo assists the Guardians in fighting off the High Evolutionary's army and helping the children and animals aboard his ship escape to Knowhere, before joining a new iteration of the Guardians under Rocket.

=== Video games ===
- Cosmo the Spacedog appears in Disney Infinity 2.0, voiced by Carlos Alazraqui.
- Cosmo the Spacedog appears as a non-playable character in Marvel Avengers Alliance.
- Cosmo the Spacedog appears as a non-playable character in Marvel Heroes.
- Cosmo the Spacedog appears as a playable character in Marvel Puzzle Quest.
- Cosmo the Spacedog appears as a playable character in Lego Marvel Super Heroes 2.
- Cosmo the Spacedog appears in Marvel Ultimate Alliance 3: The Black Order, voiced again by James Arnold Taylor.
- Cosmo the Spacedog appears as a non-playable character in Marvel's Guardians of the Galaxy, voiced by Alex Ivanovici.
- Cosmo the Spacedog appears in Marvel Snap.
- Cosmo the Spacedog appears in Marvel Rivals.

=== Miscellaneous ===
Cosmo the Spacedog appears in Guardians of the Galaxy – Mission: Breakout!.
