= Diamondhead (comics) =

Publication information
- Publisher: Marvel Comics
- First appearance: Nova #3 (November 1976)
- Created by: Marv Wolfman; Sal Buscema

In-story information
- Alter ego: Archbald Dyker
- Team affiliations: Terrible Trio
- Abilities: Superhuman strength and invulnerability

Diamondhead is a fictional character appearing in American comic books published by Marvel Comics.

== Publication history ==
Diamondhead first appeared in Nova #3 (Nov. 1976), and was created by Marv Wolfman and Sal Buscema.

The character subsequently appears in Nova #6-8 (Feb.-April 1977), #10 (June 1977), #22-25 (Nov. 1978-May 1979), Fantastic Four #206 (May 1979), #208-209 (July-Aug. 1979), Rom #24 (Nov. 1981), Quasar #16 (Nov. 1990), #20 (March 1991), The New Warriors Annual #1 (1991), Nova vol. 2 #1 (Jan. 1994), #10 (Oct. 1994), Nova: The Human Rocket #2 (June 1999), Civil War: Front Line #9 (Feb. 2007), and Nova vol. 4 #2 (July 2007).

Diamondhead received an entry in the All-New Official Handbook of the Marvel Universe A-Z #3 (2006), and The Official Handbook of the Marvel Universe A to Z HC vol. 02 (2008).

== Fictional character biography ==
Archibald Dyker was a troubled child from South Hampton. A former amateur body champion, he later became a petty thug. Dyker is later exposed to a diamond-powered laser during an attempt to steal precious gems, which gives him a powerful diamond-like body. He uses his new abilities to enhance his criminal career. After being defeated by Nova, he forms the criminal gang the Terrible Trio with Condor and Powerhouse. After Condor is defeated by Sphinx, Diamondhead allies with the Sphinx and Doctor Sun. Along with his allies, Nova, and the Champions of Xandar, Diamondhead goes to Xandar on Nova's spacecraft. Once there, Diamondhead betrays the Nova Corps to the Skrulls. This causes the death of one of the Champions, and Diamondhead is left to float in space.

Following the Stamford incident, the identities of the New Warriors were publicly leaked, including Nova's. Diamondhead uses this information to locate Nova's parents' house and patiently waits until his nemesis comes home. When Nova returns to Earth after the Annihilation War, Diamondhead attacks him. Nova easily defeats Diamondhead and takes him back to prison.

== Powers and abilities ==
Diamondhead has a diamond-like body that gives him superhuman strength and durability. His time as a boxer makes him a skilled fighter, who is noted to regularly train for more power. His bad temper, pride and ego diminish his effectiveness in battle when provoked.
