= Blitzkrieg (comic book) =

- Cover to Blitzkrieg #1 (Jan./Feb. 1976). Art by Joe Kubert.

Publication information
- Publisher: DC Comics
- Schedule: Monthly
- Format: Ongoing series
- Publication date: Jan./Feb. 1976 - Sept./Oct. 1976
- No. of issues: 5

Creative team
- Written by: Robert Kanigher
- Artist(s): Ric Estrada

Blitzkrieg was a short-lived 1970s war-themed comic book published by DC Comics.

== Publication history ==
The focus of the series was an anthology of World War II stories featuring soldiers of Nazi Germany as well as the civilians resisting or victimized by the regime. This series differed from most other US-published war comics which focused exclusively on Allied forces; as a result, the cover of each issue included the tagline "We dare to be different!"

Unlike the more famous stories of the German World War I flying ace, Hans von Hammer, a.k.a. The Enemy Ace, the stories in this series kept an unambiguously negative tone against the World War II German military. The series was also notable for its strong (for the time) depictions of violence and gruesome images. The series was canceled after five issues.
