= Condor (comics) =

- Condor as seen in Nova #2. Art by John Buscema.

Publication information
- Publisher: Marvel Comics
- First appearance: Nova #2 (1976)
- Created by: Marv Wolfman; John Buscema

In-story information
- Species: Bird People
- Place of origin: Earth
- Team affiliations: Terrible Trio
- Abilities: Enhanced strength, agility and reflexes Flight via wings

Condor is a fictional character appearing in American comic books published by Marvel Comics. He is depicted as a criminal from an Inhumans offshoot called the Bird People.

== Publication history ==
The Condor first appeared in Nova #2-3 (Oct.–Nov. 1976), and was created by Marv Wolfman and John Buscema. The character subsequently appears in Nova #6-8 (Feb.–April 1977), #10 (June 1977), Nova #2-5 (Feb.–May 1994), #13 (Jan. 1995), Nova #3-4 (July–Aug. 1999), #7 (Nov. 1999), and The Amazing Spider-Man #562-563 (Aug. 2008).

== Fictional character biography ==
Condor is a winged criminal scientist and a member of the Bird People, an offshoot of the Inhumans. He is a member of the Terrible Trio, along with Diamondhead and Powerhouse, and an enemy of Nova and the Champions of Xandar. During a battle with the Sphinx, he is transformed into an actual condor.

Condor spends several years in the form of an animal until he lands on the island of Bird-Brain and the Ani-Mates. Bird-Brain recognizes that the Condor is not a normal animal and restores him to a semi-humanoid form. Condor confronts Nova again, but ultimately leaves, feeling their conflict is pointless.

Condor attacks Nova and Reed Richards, but is defeated and taken into the custody of S.H.I.E.L.D. Red Raven attempts to bring Condor back by force, hoping to place him on trial among the Bird-People to face justice. Red Raven brings a group of Avians to attack Manhattan, but Nova convinces them to call off the attack.

It is revealed in the Guardians of the Galaxy series that Condor is one of the inmates left behind in the Negative Zone Prison Alpha. He becomes involved in a fight with Star-Lord who, with the help of Jack Flag, is trying to stop Blastaar from invading Earth.

During the Avengers: Standoff! storyline, Condor appears as an inmate of Pleasant Hill, a gated community established by S.H.I.E.L.D. After his memory is restored by Helmut Zemo and Fixer, Condor joins the villains in attacking S.H.I.E.L.D.

== Powers and abilities ==
The Condor possesses two wings on his back which allow for flight. He also has enhanced superhuman strength and sharp talons on the end of each finger.

== Other characters named Condor ==
There had been other characters that used the name Condor:

- A character named Condor was a Delvadian revolutionary who targeted US ambassador Jerome Villers, only to encounter Daredevil. Condor is ultimately killed in a landslide during a battle with Daredevil.
- A superhero called El Condor is among the South American superheroes killed by Everyman.
- A character Condor is a member of the Contingency, a former S.H.I.E.L.D. black ops team that was created to kill mutants.
