= Langford, South Dakota =

- Town
- Location in Marshall County and the state of South Dakota
- Coordinates: 45°36′08″N 97°49′49″W
- Country: United States
- State: South Dakota
- County: Marshall
- Established: 1886

Area
  - Total: 0.32 sq mi (0.82 km^{2})
  - Land: 0.32 sq mi (0.82 km^{2})
  - Water: 0 sq mi (0.00 km^{2})
- Elevation: 1,371 ft (418 m)

Population (2020)
  - Total: 283
  - Density: 892.6/sq mi (344.62/km^{2})
- Time zone: UTC-6 (Central (CST))
  - Summer (DST): UTC-5 (CDT)
- ZIP code: 57454
- Area code: 605
- FIPS code: 46-35820
- GNIS feature ID: 1267454
- Website: langfordsd.com

Langford is a town in Marshall County, South Dakota, United States. The population was 283 at the 2020 census.

Langford was laid out in 1886, and named in honor of Sam Langford, the original owner of the town site.

== Geography ==
According to the United States Census Bureau, the town has a total area of 0.31 square miles (0.80 km^{2}), all land.

== Demographics ==
Historical population
Census	Pop.	Note	%±
1890	198		—
1900	239		20.7%
1910	463		93.7%
1920	510		10.2%
1930	444		−12.9%
1940	452		1.8%
1950	456		0.9%
1960	397		−12.9%
1970	328		−17.4%
1980	307		−6.4%
1990	298		−2.9%
2000	290		−2.7%
2010	313		7.9%
2020	283		−9.6%
U.S. Decennial Census

=== 2010 census ===
As of the census of 2010, there were 313 people, 146 households, and 83 families residing in the town. The population density was 1,009.7 inhabitants per square mile (389.8/km^{2}). There were 164 housing units at an average density of 529.0 units per square mile (204.2 units/km^{2}). The racial makeup of the town was 96.5% White, 2.9% Native American, 0.3% Asian, and 0.3% from two or more races. Hispanic or Latino of any race were 0.6% of the population.

There were 146 households, of which 23.3% had children under the age of 18 living with them, 45.2% were married couples living together, 7.5% had a female householder with no husband present, 4.1% had a male householder with no wife present, and 43.2% were non-families. 39.7% of all households were made up of individuals, and 21.2% had someone living alone who was 65 years of age or older. The average household size was 2.14 and the average family size was 2.90.

The median age in the town was 46.5 years. 23.3% of residents were under the age of 18; 4.8% were between the ages of 18 and 24; 20.4% were from 25 to 44; 27.2% were from 45 to 64; and 24.3% were 65 years of age or older. The gender makeup of the town was 54.0% male and 46.0% female.

=== 2000 census ===
As of the census of 2000, there were 290 people, 139 households, and 73 families residing in the town. The population density was 1,024.4 inhabitants per square mile (395.5/km^{2}). There were 163 housing units at an average density of 575.8 units per square mile (222.3 units/km^{2}). The racial makeup of the town was 96.90% White and 3.10% Native American. Hispanic or Latino of any race were 1.72% of the population.

There were 139 households, out of which 21.6% had children under the age of 18 living with them, 47.5% were married couples living together, 4.3% had a female householder with no husband present, and 46.8% were non-families. 44.6% of all households were made up of individuals, and 25.2% had someone living alone who was 65 years of age or older. The average household size was 2.09 and the average family size was 2.95.

In the town, the population was spread out, with 23.4% under the age of 18, 2.4% from 18 to 24, 25.5% from 25 to 44, 23.8% from 45 to 64, and 24.8% who were 65 years of age or older. The median age was 44 years. For every 100 females, there were 94.6 males. For every 100 females age 18 and over, there were 88.1 males.

The median income for a household in the town was $28,214, and the median income for a family was $38,750. Males had a median income of $26,458 versus $21,667 for females. The per capita income for the town was $19,062. About 2.7% of families and 11.3% of the population were below the poverty line, including 9.5% of those under the age of eighteen and 10.7% of those 65 or over.

== Notable person ==
- Rocky Hartberg, underground comix artist
