= Disney Infinity 2.0 =

2014 video game

- Cover art
- Developers: Avalanche Software; Heavy Iron Studios (Windows, iOS, Android)
- Publisher: Disney Interactive Studios
- Writer: Brian Michael Bendis
- Composers: Chuck E. Myers; Kevin Manthei; James Dooley
- Series: Disney Infinity
- Platforms: iOS, Android, PlayStation 3, PlayStation 4, PlayStation Vita, Wii U, Microsoft Windows, Xbox 360, Xbox One
- Release: AU/EU: September 18, 2014^{1}; UK: September 19, 2014^{1}; NA: September 23, 2014^{1}; Microsoft Windows: WW: October 2, 2014; PlayStation Vita: WW: May 9, 2015
- Genre: Action-adventure
- Modes: Single-player, multiplayer

Disney Infinity 2.0 (also known as Disney Infinity: Marvel Super Heroes) is a 2014 toys-to-life action-adventure game developed by Avalanche Software and published by Disney Interactive Studios. It is the sequel to Disney Infinity (2013) and was announced on April 8, 2014. The game was released on September 23, 2014, in North America, September 19, 2014, in the United Kingdom, September 18, 2014, in Australia and the rest of Europe for iOS, PlayStation 3, PlayStation 4, Wii U, Microsoft Windows, Xbox 360, Xbox One, and PlayStation Vita on May 9, 2015.

Featuring original story material by Brian Michael Bendis, Marvel Super Heroes includes three plots and includes characters from both Marvel and Disney properties. The main campaign is divided into three storylines. The first storyline follows the Avengers as they prevent the Norse god Loki from rebuilding the Casket of Ancient Winters. The second storyline centers on Spider-Man and features him, Nova, Iron Fist, and Nick Fury teaming with Venom and being tasked with the objective to stop Green Goblin and Mysterio's symbiote invasion. The third and final storyline concentrates on the Guardians of the Galaxy, in a plot inspired by the movie with the same name, where the Guardians must protect Knowhere from Ronan the Accuser.

Disney Infinity 2.0 expands Disney Infinity's array of tools to use in the Toybox mode, an open world sandbox. Additionally, the ability to personalize individual characters has been added, using a Skill Tree. Marvel Super Heroes adds on the previous game's community sharing options, including the sharing of personal creations.

It was also the first Marvel-licensed game to be published by Disney Interactive Studios, due to Sega's contract with Marvel expiring after the release of Captain America: Super Soldier in 2011, and Activision's contract expiring after the release of The Amazing Spider-Man 2, released a few months prior to the release of Infinity 2.0. A sequel, Disney Infinity 3.0, was released on August 28, 2015, in Europe and August 29, 2015, in North America.

== Plot ==
The game follows multiple plots, with each Playset having its own.

=== Avengers Playset ===
The Avengers Playset centers on Loki and MODOK attempting to rebuild the Casket of Ancient Winters, with the aid of the Frost Giants, in order to freeze New York City.

=== Spider-Man Playset ===
The Spider-Man Playset, which is inspired by Ultimate Spider-Man, centers on Green Goblin and Mysterio cloning the Venom symbiote and launching a symbiote invasion.

=== Guardians of the Galaxy Playset ===
The Guardians of the Galaxy Playset, which is inspired by the Guardians of the Galaxy film in terms of design, centers on the Guardians stealing an Infinity Stone from Ronan the Accuser. Ronan follows the Guardians to the planet Knowhere. With the help of Cosmo the Spacedog and The Collector the Guardians must protect Knowhere from Ronan and the Sakaaran fleet. The Guardians of the Galaxy eventually make way onto Ronan's ship, the Dark Aster, to defeat him once and for all.

== Gameplay ==
The Skill Tree upgrade system

Disney Infinity 2.0 features similar gameplay to Disney Infinity. Each character can equip a "Pack" or a "Tool". Packs are items that are worn and can be equipped on a character's back, occasionally shown as some sort of backpack. Tools are items, such as rifles, that can be equipped in a character's hand. Some aspects of the game, however, have been changed. In addition to ground movement, certain characters can fly and hover. The size of Toybox worlds and Playset has been increased, notably due to the inclusion of flying. Certain characters can climb walls, including the Hulk. The level cap of playable characters has been expanded from Level 15 to Level 20. Characters can be "leveled up" by collecting sparks. A "Skill Tree" has been incorporated into the game and can be used to upgrade a character's abilities. The figures from the first game also receive additional abilities through the Skill Tree. The choices made in the Skill Tree are semi-permanent, as players have the option to reset the Skill Tree choices by resetting their character to Level 0. Some characters can jump long distances, including Hulk. Each character plays differently from another, with characters being roughly divided into two categories, Ranged and Melee. Ranged characters fight from far distances, while Melee characters fight using close combat. Signature moves can be unlocked as the player progresses. For example, Drax primarily utilizes short-ranged melee attacks to defeat enemies, while Star-Lord can use ranged pistols. As characters are leveled up, new abilities will be unlocked. Iron Man's ground slam and Hulk's Thunderclap abilities can be unlocked once players have enough Skill Points. Characters' upgrades differ. Iron Man can upgrade his blasting capabilities, while Thor and Hulk can upgrade their strength, using the new Special Skills and Combat system. All upgrades, skills and progress applied to the character will be saved to the figurine. The freeform unlock system in Disney Infinity 2.0 replaces the roulette-based unlock system from Disney Infinity. If a player is defeated in-game, they must wait a certain time frame until they can use the character they were using again. A map scanner has been implemented to allow players to get around worlds more easily. Mission givers are also present in the game. In order to web-sling players do not need to attach their webs to surroundings near by.

Disney Infinity 2.0 is split up into two game modes: Playset and Toybox (referred in Disney Infinity 2.0 as Toybox 2.0.) In Playset mode, players can play open world multiple story modes based specifically on a certain franchise. Each Playset spans from 6–10 hours in length. These Playsets can be accessed by placing the Playset piece (also known as a crystal shard piece) on the Disney Infinity Base, a near field communication-enabled hexagonal platform that has two round spots to place figures (and use them in the game) and one hexagonal spot to place the Playset piece or Power Discs. Only figures, usable in the game through near-field communication technology, that are from a Playset's corresponding franchise can be used in that Playset. Certain characters, including Nova, Iron Man, Rocket Raccoon and Hulk are playable in more than one Playset, by collecting tokens (called "Cross Over Tokens") scattered throughout levels. Once players have collected ten Cross Over Tokens for one character, that character can be used in another Playset and will unlock exclusive storylines. The Avengers Playset and the Spider-Man Playset take place in "Marvel Manhattan", a version of Manhattan that is 4x larger than The Incredibles Playset featured in the first Disney Infinity title. The Incredibles Playset was the largest environment in Disney Infinity. While in Playset mode, players can uncover secret missions and new goods that can be used in the Toybox. Bendis penned the stories and dialogue of all future Marvel Playsets. Local multiplayer can be accessed through split screen.

The Toy Box Game Maker tool, which can be used to restrict access to perform certain actions

The latter game mode, Toybox mode is a sandbox mode that allows players to create their own games and worlds, using items unlocked in Playset mode. Certain characters, including Tinker Bell, cannot be played inside Playset mode and only in Toybox mode. Toybox mode supports local and online multiplayer. In Toybox mode, players are given a "Magic Wand", which can be used to place items around the sandbox, customize items and access the Toy Shop (a virtual shop where players can purchase new items for use in the Toybox). The Magic Wand can also be used to set commands on objects, using "Game Logic". Creativi-Toys, objects in the Toybox, can be set to make Game Logic return in the game, with 75 new additions. For example, a player can set a party cannon to shoot confetti if they connect the cannon to a button. Players can also restrict access to certain packs and tools in the Toybox, including the Magic Wand. The Toy Shop replaces the Toy Spinner from the first game. Items that can be used in Toybox mode can be unlocked through Playset mode. In an attempt to make Toybox building easier, the game features improved and enhanced Toybox editor tools (including in-game "brushes", that automatically create scenery for players, including cities, dungeons and race tracks). Templates, pre-built mini-games when placed into a world or "Auto Creators" are also present in the game. Templates range from Cliff-side beat 'em up Battle Arenas (similar to Super Smash Bros.) to obstacle courses. Players can then tweak and change Templates to their liking. In order to add some Templates into the Toybox, players must decide the length, width and height of a box, that will house and generate the desired structure. A Challenge Maker has also been implemented into the game, allowing players to create structured games. Result screens were also added for competitive play Toyboxes. A new feature introduced in Disney Infinity 2.0 is the Text Creator, which allows players to write their own text bubbles in the Toybox. All text, however, must be filtered and moderated through a safe chat server. The game also introduces the Toy Box Game Maker, a tool that can restrict access to certain actions, including the use of the Magic Wand. An undo button has also been implemented into the game. Objects from the first game can be unlocked in Disney Infinity 2.0 by placing a Disney Infinity Playset piece on the Disney Infinity 2.0 base. It also features automated builders, that can be dropped into the Toybox and generate worlds for players. Automated builders include Eve from WALL-E and Sultan from Aladdin. In the Toybox mode players can also create interior areas, a feature absent from the first game. Interior areas (styled in-game as INteriors) can also be themed to certain characters. More than twenty rooms can be added inside an INteriors. Multiple INteriors can be connected through doorways inside buildings.

In Disney Infinity each figure had their own "Adventure", a playable level that was made specifically for the character. Toybox Adventures did not return in Disney Infinity 2.0. An introductory Toybox is pre-loaded into the game, and is filled with Game Play Hosts, who can assign missions and answer questions a player may have. Rewards are given to players once Game Play Host missions are completed. Players can share their Toybox creations with friends by uploading them onto the internet. To help incorporate the new sharing features, a Newsfeed screen was added to the main menu. Players can upload up to 300 Toyboxes to a private cloud and can save up to 100,000 Toyboxes. Players can "like" favorite published Toyboxes and find other Toyboxes, that have found positive reception from other players. In order to make searching through the shared Toyboxes easier, players can set categories and filters that apply to the Toybox that they want to play in.

The game introduces Toybox Games, discs which allows players to create games based on genres such as tower defense and dungeon crawling. Each Toybox Game is around 3–4 hours in length. The tower defense Toybox Game is set in Asgard and called Attack on Asgard. In Attack on Asgard, Loki commands Frost Giants to invade Odin's Palace.

Power Discs, physical discs placed on the Infinity Base to unlock skies, textures and in-game toys, return from the first game. There are two types of Power Discs, Circular and Hexagonal. Circular Power Discs give in-game boosts to playable characters and Hexagonal Power Discs unlock skies, textures and in-game toys (including vehicles). The game also features two-wheeled vehicles, like motorcycles in addition to four-wheeled vehicles. Eighty-two Power Discs have been released. Some Power Discs feature "Team-Ups". Team-Ups make other characters pop up in-game to fight alongside the player. Certain Power Discs also unlock new costumes for characters, including Gamora's "space armor". Additionally, some Hexagonal Power Discs can launch "Area of Effect" attacks.

All figures, Power Discs and toyboxes, from Disney Infinity are compatible with Disney Infinity 2.0. Bases from Disney Infinity are also compatible. However, an Xbox 360 base is not compatible with Xbox One. Whether or not players decide to use the Infinity Base from the first or second game, that base must be connected to a console via USB.

== Development ==
=== Concept ===
Disney Infinity was originally described to be a "platform that's always growing and will ultimately have something for everyone," and that the Infinity platform is open to expanding. When Disney Infinity was yet to be released, Avalanche Software CEO, John Blackburn stated that discussions about the inclusion of Star Wars and Marvel characters in the game, took place. On that subject Blackburn said "I hope so! As a developer, I so want that. When Disney bought Lucasfilm, I was like, 'Holy crap! This is awesome!' But at this point in time, there's been some discussions about that, there's just been no decisions made." In February 2014, Avalanche Software began hiring game testers for a potential Disney Infinity sequel. Star Wars characters and playsets would eventually be added in the following entry, Disney Infinity 3.0.

Avalanche Software started working with Marvel Entertainment, after it was acquired by Disney in 2009, about developing a game featuring Marvel superheroes, in 2011. The conception of the game started immediately after the acquisition, as Disney Infinity 2.0's executive producer, John Vignocchi commented: "As soon as the acquisition happened we started having conversations about Marvel. I giggle that I know the date, because I checked in via Foursquare at Marvel. So that's how I knew, that was the first time we sat down with Joe Quesada." Avalanche developed a demo in October 2013, which featured the Marvel superhero Iron Man flying through a rudimentary city. The demo was later released to the public almost a year later.

Since the game was set to include Marvel characters, Brian Michael Bendis, a comic book writer, was brought on to write original story material. This would allow the game's developers to provide more deep and immersive storylines. With a more complex combat system, Ninja Theory was brought on the development team in February 2014, to fulfill the concept.

=== Announcement ===
On March 13, 2013, Marvel Entertainment released a teaser trailer featuring characters from Disney Infinity interacting with Captain America's shield. D23, the official Disney fan club, originally reported that the game would be released in August 2013. This statement was later removed, as representatives of the site said "we erroneously reported about the launch of the next chapter of Disney Infinity. This information was incorrect. More news about Disney Infinity will be shared on April 30, and we hope you will check back for that update."

On April 30, 2014, Disney announced a follow-up game, to Disney Infinity, Disney Infinity 2.0, at Pacific Theatres' Arc-Light Cinerama Done, in Hollywood, for release on the Xbox 360, PlayStation 3, Wii U, iOS, Microsoft Windows, Xbox One, and PlayStation 4 in Q4 2014, featuring characters from the Marvel Comics universe. The announcement was also broadcast live online through a webcast. The unveiling included appearances by Clark Gregg, who appears as Agent Coulson in Agents of S.H.I.E.L.D., and Samuel L. Jackson, who appears as Nick Fury in Marvel Super Heroes and many films in the Marvel Cinematic Universe. Jackson was in-character as Fury, in a video where he discusses "Project Infinity."

Marvel Entertainment chief creative officer Joe Quesada was also at the unveiling, declaring that the comic book characters are "uniquely Marvel but still fit within the game". At Sony's Electronic Entertainment Expo 2014 conference it was revealed that the game would be released for the PlayStation Vita and PlayStation TV, in 2015. The PlayStation Vita version of the game would play like the PlayStation 3 version. The Guardians of the Galaxy Playset was revealed on July 23, 2014, and it was confirmed Studio Gobo (the studio that developed the Pirates of the Caribbean Playset for Disney Infinity) developed the Playset.

=== Design ===
The design stages of the Disney Infinity 2.0 character Black Widow

The art style from Disney Infinity, in which every character and object is designed to look like a toy and was co-designed by Pixar, was carried over to Disney Infinity 2.0. Developers re-imagined Marvel characters in this art style. John Vignocchi said on the redesigns, "it was a really interesting process. Working with Joe Quesada and the creative team and Marvel -- getting them to understand what the visual aesthetic of 'Disney Infinity' is, that is, they're not the characters themselves, but toy versions of those characters, and reimagining some of Marvel's most iconic superheroes in that art style was a daunting, but very fun task for this team." Each character goes through multiple stages of development, including how they will look in the game and what their figurine's pose will be. The developers specifically designed the Venom character to be on par with Hulk when it came to size and mass. On Venom's design John Vignocchi said "we hulked him out a bit. in fact, the character is the only one that comes close to the Incredible Hulk in the game (designers wanted another brute to offer) and when fully powered up, stands on equal footing with the green beast."

No "Crystal" variants of characters have been designed for Disney Infinity 2.0, unlike the first game. The Disney Infinity team wanted to focus on a more diverse array of characters, as said by John Vignocchi "we're not planning on doing the crystal characters again. Our focus this time around – rather than create a whole series of chase characters, we wanted to make sure that we had a wider variety of characters," he said. "What we decided to do instead was really put our horsepower into creating different characters as opposed to variants. We think our fans appreciate having a character like Star-Lord or Rocket Raccoon as opposed to another version of Mickey Mouse." The game has been designed to be less violent, in order to appeal to a wider audience. Despite this, a Crystal variation of Sorcerer's Apprentice Mickey Mouse would be released.

When designing the game, Avalanche Software focused not only on the inclusion of the NFC-enabled Marvel figurines, but improving the Toybox mode (especially for younger players) as well. Jimmy Pitaro, president of Disney Interactive Studios stated "we wanted to take everything that worked so well and make it epic." Each character was picked based on how they would fit in the game, as said by TQ Jefferson, "what you're going to see as we roll out and reveal more characters, is that they're going to be more characters that you've known forever and they make sense," Jefferson said. "And the other characters, you may not know them as well, but once you see them in-game, you're going to understand why we made the choices that we made. These characters bring a certain narrative strength with them and, just as important, they bring a unique bit of gameplay with them ... [these are the] characters that are the most fun to play ... that have the most impact on story. Once you see the full spectrum of characters, it's not just an Avengers game. It's very much a Marvel super heroes game."

The development team tried to appeal to the game's target audience (children) by making changes to environments, with one being to disregard physics. Matt Solie, of Disney Interactive Studios, when asked about the topic, stated: "I had my nephews, who are eight and five, try Amazing Spider-Man 2, which is the epitome of physics-based, buildings attached—[it's] not really fun for them. They didn't understand, 'Why can't I swing?'" Solie said. "It just made sense for a kids and family game." Also basing the game around its target audience John Blackburn, part of the game's development team, looked to his 6-year-old nephew, Logan, to see what younger audiences wanted out of the game. The procedural editing options were added, after Blackburn noticed that Logan was building very simple things in the Toybox.

Though Disney Infinity 2.0 is inspired by Avengers Assemble, Ultimate Spider-Man, Hulk and the Agents of S.M.A.S.H. and the Marvel Cinematic Universe in terms of design, the possibility of the female Thor from the comics joining the game has not been ruled out. On the possibility of the game's artists possibly designing a toylike female Thor, John Vignocchi stated "The Thor that we have inside of Infinity is based on the animated series Avengers Assemble. Infinity being a platform that evolves over time, that certainly doesn't rule out the possibility of creating a new version of Thor. Should there be a demand, we'd love to do that." No X-Men characters would be included in the game. Analysts believe this is due to the fact that 20th Century Fox owned the film rights to X-Men.

The Disney Infinity fanbase and "community" have avidly played a role in development of Disney Infinity 2.0. Community members Stewart "CrazybyNick" Malcolm, Patrick "PapaEcho" Efird, Tyler "Tyforce" Cole, Jose "doctorlogicgate" Abalos and Quinn "quinnjitsu" Johnson, who competed in multiple challenges hosted by the Disney Infinity team, were actually hired to create free downloadable levels for Disney Infinity 2.0. This is probably due to the Fox Embargo.

Ninja Theory was hired by Disney to design Loki, Ronan, Green Goblin and Jasmine's combat systems and polish all of the other characters' combat systems.

=== PlayStation 4 and Xbox One development ===
Prior to the release of Disney Infinity, Avalanche Software expressed interest in supporting Disney Infinity toys on Xbox One and PlayStation 4 consoles. John Day, of Avalanche Software stated that Xbox One and PlayStation 4 versions of Disney Infinity would likely be "way more beautiful," offer "a whole lot more" content, "or both."

The versions of the game for the PlayStation 4 and the Xbox One have better graphics and more memory than their counterparts for the PlayStation 3, Xbox 360, and Wii U. When discussing the additional power of the PlayStation 4 and the Xbox One, John Vignocchi stated "I'd say, specifically related to Xbox One, the graphical prowess of that system is incredible. So, we're looking at what we can do to make sure the game looks incredible on [the Xbox One]. From a features perspective, I'd say the thing we're most excited about is that players are going to be able to create Toy Boxes now that are much, much larger than they were before," and "In terms of what we're doing with [PS4 and Xbox One], we're planning on making use of the graphical prowess of those machines — they can pump out some amazing-looking graphics. In addition to that, what we're planning on doing is taking advantage of the overall memory footprint. In Disney Infinity there were certain platforms that were constrained by the amount of RAM, so people couldn't truly build the toy box of their dreams. We've optimized the engine to allow the last-gen, PS3 and 360, to still build compelling Toy Box levels, but with Xbox One and PS4, the sky's the limit." The Xbox One and PlayStation 4 versions of the game are more advanced than the others, as executive producer John Vignocchi said "one of the most unique features of Disney Infinity 2.0 on Xbox One and PlayStation 4, just because of the memory footprint of those systems, is that the size of the toy boxes you can create are just gigantic." The game engine is improved and expanded.

== Release ==
The game's Marvel Super Heroes starter pack featuring Thor, Iron Man, and Black Widow.

Disney Infinity 2.0 game disc and video game software were released to the public on multiple dates, through "Starter Packs." Starter Packs are bundles that provided players with the game disc, the Infinity Base, a web code card, a poster and varying playable characters based on the Starter Pack they purchase.

The game was first released in the Marvel Super Heroes Starter Pack, which includes the game disc, the Infinity Base, the Avengers Playset, a web code card, a poster as well as Iron Man, Black Widow and Thor playable characters. This bundle was released on September 23, 2014, in North America, September 19, 2014, in the United Kingdom, and on September 18, 2014, in Australasia and the rest of Europe, on PlayStation 3, PlayStation 4, Wii U, Xbox 360 and Xbox One.

The Toy Box Starter Pack (known as the Toybox Combo Starter Pack in some markets), was released on November 4, 2014, in North America and November 7, 2014, in the United Kingdom, includes the game disc, Merida and Stitch playable characters, two Toybox Game Discs, the Infinity Base, a web code card and a poster. This bundle was released for PlayStation 3, PlayStation 4, Wii U, Xbox 360 and Xbox One.

A Collector's Edition Starter Pack was exclusive to the PlayStation 3 and PlayStation 4 released, in addition to everything included in the Disney Infinity 2.0 Starter Pack, it includes the Hulk, Captain America and Hawkeye as playable characters and a diorama featuring a Frost Beast to display all The Avengers characters. The Collector's Edition was unveiled during Sony's E3 2014 press conference, and was created after a partnership between Sony and Disney was formed. The Collector's Edition was exclusive to EB Games in Australia and New Zealand. This bundle was eventually released on September 23, 2014, in North America, September 19, 2014, in the United Kingdom, and on September 18, 2014, in Australasia and the rest of Europe.

The game was bundled with a 12 GB PlayStation 3 console. A Disney Infinity 2.0 Marvel Premium Value Pack bundle exclusive to Amazon.com includes the Marvel Super Heroes Starter Pack, Captain America, Venom and Rocket Raccoon playable characters, a Power Disc blind pack and the Spider-Man Playset.

For those who purchased the first game, Disney Infinity 2.0 was also released digitally, through the Nintendo eShop, PlayStation Store, and Xbox Games Store. The digital version of the game was not available for Xbox One, due to hardware compatibility issues. The digital version of Disney Infinity 2.0 wasn’t available at launch, but instead was released on November 4, 2014, in North America. This version of the game includes the Toybox mode, but requires an Infinity Base and Disney Infinity figurines.

The Microsoft Windows version of the game was released digitally, as a standalone, brand-new application for Windows. Micro transactions were required to unlock additional content. The iOS version of Disney Infinity 2.0 was through the Apple App Store.

Disney Interactive Studios announced that starting July 24, 2014, through September 22, 2014, consumers who pre-order the Starter Pack would receive a free Disney Infinity 2.0 figurine from retailers nationwide. Retailers including Disney Store, Tesco and Game have offered this deal.

== Marketing ==
Disney Interactive Studios has been present at multiple conventions (including the Electronic Entertainment Expo and San Diego Comic-Con), promoting Disney Infinity 2.0. Free figures were handed out at E3 2014, and at Blogger Bash's Sweet Suite 2014. In promotion of both Disney Infinity 2.0 and Big Hero 6, Disney created a giant-sized version of the Baymax Disney Infinity 2.0 figure. At San Diego Comic-Con, Disney set up a pop-up shop, which allowed the public to play the game, meet special guests and participate in giveaways. Alex Hirsch, creator of Gravity Falls was also present at the pop-up shop, to announce the inclusion of Gravity Falls Power Discs. Disney also hosted special events for D23 and Marvel Unlimited members. The game was also present during the Marvel Games panel. Additionally the Marvel Booth and Microsoft Game Lounge held demos, to promote the game. A Disney Infinity 2.0-themed Xbox One was also given away at Comic-Con.

On August 9, 2014 GameStop held Disney Infinity Day, an event that celebrates the game in stores, by offering promotions on it. An official Disney Infinity Toy Box Summit was held from August 15, 2014, to August 17, 2014, in Salt Lake City. The summit was a fan appreciation event and allowed invitees to participate in multiple competitions involving the Toybox. Disney allowed invitees to have a hands-on preview with Disney Infinity 2.0. An in-depth look at the Toybox was also showcased during the Summit. Disney also held a "Movie Magic Video Contest," which gave players a chance to win a Captain America figure and a chance to go to the Toybox Summit. Disney Infinity 2.0 was included in Disney's "Marvel Super Hero September" campaign, which promoted multiple Marvel films and products, including Captain America: The Winter Soldier.

Multiple trailers have been released for the game. A teaser was released on April 8, 2014. The reveal trailer for the game was unveiled on April 30, 2014. A trailer focusing on the Avengers Playset was released on May 22, 2014. A second trailer this time based on the Spider-Man Playset was released on June 10, 2014. Disney revealed Stitch and Tinker Bell with a preview of the game, on July 16, 2014. Another trailer focusing on the Guardians of the Galaxy Playset was released on July 23, 2014 A trailer centering on super villains (Loki, Ronan and Green Goblin) was shown at San Diego Comic-Con on July 26, 2014, and was released to the public on July 28, 2014. On August 7, 2014, a trailer focusing on Aladdin and Jasmine from Aladdin was released. To coincide Gamescom 2014, Disney Interactive Studios released a trailer featuring Donald Duck on August 12, 2014. An informational trailer for the Toybox was released on August 14, 2014. Another trailer centering on the Toybox was released on August 20, 2014. A trailer revolving around Baymax and Hiro Hamada from Big Hero 6 was released on August 27, 2014. A trailer, titled "Walk It", themed to the Aerosmith song "Walk This Way", was released on September 5, 2014.

Multiple teases from the Disney Infinity team have been made on social networks, including Twitter and Facebook. One prime example is the "Something wicked is coming to #DisneyInfinity... pic.twitter.com/tt8sJytvwi" tweet, which revealed Maleficent would appear in the game. To promote the game, developers have appeared in interviews conducted by gaming sites, including GameSpot. Disney has also chosen to advertise the game through Radio Disney. A weekly web series, The Disney Infinity Toy Box TV: The Official Weekly Web Show, which highlights outstanding Toy Box creations from players, has regularly been providing updates on the game. These updates include "sneak peeks" at characters (in-depth descriptions of characters' abilities and appearances.) The web show is hosted John Vignocchi and the game's community manager Allison Petrek.

In a marketing stunt, a holographic visualization of Hulk was projected at Tower Bridge. The projection of Hulk stood 36 feet high, and after debuting the stunt, Disney officially uploaded a video of the hologram on YouTube. The stunt also featured holographic projections of Spider-Man and Iron Man.

Since the game's unveiling there have been multiple leaks revealing content featured within Disney Infinity 2.0, primarily from stores marketing the game. Target inattentively leaked the release date of the game, September 23, 2014, in a flyer. Venom was also leaked by the flyer, as the character had never been revealed prior. Walmart later leaked that multiple characters including the Guardians of the Galaxy would be playable in the game. Walmart did so by listing multiple characters, Playset packs and Starter Packs on their website. Another image was leaked, showcasing Star-Lord and Gamora figures. On the leaks, Vignocchi stated: "Yeah, this year we definitely had a challenge with retail – putting out the sku plans and having those accessible by managers prior to announcements. But at the same time, as we've said internally – well, people care enough to talk about it, so we know we're doing something special!"

== Reception ==
Reception

Aggregate score
Aggregator	Score
Metacritic	PS4: 71/100; WIIU: 73/100; XONE: 73/100; VITA: 74/100

Review scores
Publication	Score
Destructoid	8/10
Game Informer	6.5/10
GameRevolution	4/5
GameSpot	7/10
GamesRadar+	2.5/5
GameTrailers	8/10
IGN	6.8/10
Joystiq	3.5/5
Hardcore Gamer	4/5

Upon release, Disney Infinity 2.0 received mixed to positive reviews from game critics. Review aggregator website Metacritic gave the PlayStation 4 version of the game 71/100.

While the new additions to the game's Toybox mode received praise, Disney Infinity 2.0's Playset mode was criticized. The Toybox was praised for its new additions by both David Roberts of GamesRadar and Randolph Ramsay of GameSpot. Roberts, however panned the game's "awkward combat, boring, repetitive quests and obtuse controls." He also described the Avengers Playset as being too empty and bland. Ramsay gave the game a more favorable review, but primarily found some of Disney Infinity 2.0's technical hiccups and the need to unlock toys in the Toybox, which made some of his time playing the game adverse. Brandon Jones of GameTrailers praised the easier-to-use Toybox tools, but was disappointed by a lack of diversity from the game's Playsets. Subsequently, Daniel Krupa of IGN commended the game's improved combat, which made characters more interesting, and the more accessible Toybox mode. He, like Roberts and Ramsay, criticized the game's lack of variety in its Playset mode, repetitive missions and "lifeless" version of New York City.

Andrew Reiner of Game Informer thought that though The Avengers, Guardians of the Galaxy and Spider-Man Playsets were "miserable adventures," the characters' controls were done well and that the character animations were well done. Reiner, however, was not pleased with the music featured within all three of Disney Infinity 2.0's Playsets, calling it "cringe-worthy." He also cited that the dubstep music featured in the Spider-Man Playset was poorly done. Blake Peterson of Game Revolution gave the game a more commendatory review, explaining that the game's improved combat, stronger level design (compared to the first game), expanded Toybox options, and the ability to personalize characters, were some of the major things that made the game worthwhile. In spite of that, Peterson condemned Disney Infinity 2.0's bad driving mechanics, poor player training within Toybox mode and high cost to unlock content. Steve Hannley of Hardcore Gamer also gave the game a positive review, scoring it a 4/5, saying: "Toy Box mode has been notably upgraded and overall gameplay is more polished, while increased depth will have players of all ages coming back for more," yet criticized the "repetitive" Play Sets.

At the 2014 National Academy of Video Game Trade Reviewers (NAVGTR) awards Disney Infinity 2.0 was nominated for the Game, Franchise Family category. It was nominated in the 2015 Kids' Choice Awards for "Most Addicting Game", but lost to Minecraft. During the 18th Annual D.I.C.E. Awards, the Academy of Interactive Arts & Sciences nominated Disney Infinity 2.0 for "Family Game of the Year".

=== Sales ===
Michael Pachter, of Wedbush Securities forecast that about 3.2 million copies of the game would be sold. He also forecast that the Marvel Playsets and figurines would double in sales, due to strong international appeal of super heroes. Prior to the game's release, Disney was initially surprised by the popularity of the Venom figurine. Disney has cited the character's design and abilities as its source of high sales. Rocket Raccoon was the best-selling character, since becoming available to pre-order in July 2014. The Rocket figurine sold almost twice as much as the Mike Wazowski and Elsa figurines from the first game. Those two figurines were the best-selling characters of Disney Infinity. The Rocket Raccoon figurine was later reported to have tripled in sales, but Disney declined to provide actual sales figures. Groot was the third selling character, only behind Venom. Disney expects Disney Infinity and Disney Infinity 2.0 to generate $1 billion in sales.

== Sequel ==
A potential third installment in the Disney Infinity game franchise, and the inclusion of characters from Star Wars have been teased at by executive producer John Vignocchi. When talking about the franchise's future, Vignocchi stated that "2015 is not so far, far away anymore, is it?"

On May 5, 2015, Disney announced a follow-up game through Game Informer, Disney Infinity 3.0, for release on Xbox 360, PlayStation 3, Wii U, iOS, Microsoft Windows, Xbox One, and PlayStation 4 in 2015, featuring characters from the Star Wars universe and other new Disney characters.

== Notes ==
1. Through the Marvel Super Heroes Starter Pack, the first Starter Pack that was released for the game.
2. The Microsoft Windows and iOS versions of the game were only released digitally, and do not have multiplayer modes.
