= Knowhere =

Fictional location from the Marvel Comics universe

- First appearance: Nova (vol. 4) #8 (January 2008)
- Created by: Dan Abnett; Andy Lanning

In-universe information
- Type: Space Station
- Characters: Cosmo; Guardians of the Galaxy; Nova; Knull; Black Order
- Publisher: Marvel Comics

Knowhere (pronounced "nowhere") is a fictional location appearing in American comic books published by Marvel Comics and in related media. It is depicted as the enormous severed head of an ancient celestial being and serves as an interdimensional crossroads and scientific observatory.

Knowhere appears in the live-action Marvel Cinematic Universe films Thor: The Dark World (2013), Guardians of the Galaxy (2014), Avengers: Infinity War (2018), The Guardians of the Galaxy Holiday Special (2022), and Guardians of the Galaxy Vol. 3 (2023) as well as the Disney+ animated series' What If...? and the Disney XD animated series Guardians of the Galaxy.

== Development ==
When asked about how they came up with the idea, authors Dan Abnett and Andy Lanning said:

Honestly, they just came to us. The severed Celestial head was, I think, something that popped out of Andy's mind one day. Similarly, one morning, I said "what about a talking Russian dog?" We run with these things and develop them together. It's hard to pin down where exactly they originate.

== Overview ==
Located within what appears to be a severed head of a Celestial floating along the Rip (the extreme outer edge of all spacetime with no specific physical location), Knowhere acts as a makeshift port of call and observatory of the End of the Universe for intergalactic travelers of all species and from all times. First appearing in Nova (vol. 4) #8 (see Annihilation: Conquest), the station is administered by its chief of security, Cosmo, a telepathic and telekinetic Soviet space dog originally lost in Earth orbit in the 1960s.

Knowhere maintains minor facilities for close observation of the end of the Universe, a main hall, a marketplace and other amenities including the bar, Starlin's. Cosmo assigns special "passport" bracelets allowing instantaneous transportation to and from anywhere in the Universe via the deceased Celestial's "Continuum Cortex", located within the brain-stem, from where sensors can also detect subtle disruptions in space-time occurring outside The Rip in the greater Universe. Facilitated by Cosmo and Richard Rider, Knowhere comes to be used as the base of operations for the new Guardians of the Galaxy.

The origins of Knowhere as well as who could conceivably decapitate the godlike alien and how it appeared at the end of the Universe were uncertain for a time. Abnett and Lanning have said that the origin is "A mystery that will have to wait for now, but it's a biggie!" Eventually, an answer was given: the Symbiote God Knull, while recounting his origins to Eddie Brock, revealed that he was the one who originally beheaded the Celestial with the use of All-Black the Necrosword and used the detached head to create more symbiotes, then long after Knull abandoned it, it would become the location of Knowhere.

== Other versions ==
During the Secret Wars storyline, Knowhere is shown to be the moon that orbits Battleworld. According to God Emperor Doom, this Knowhere is the head of the Celestial who came to collect Battleworld but was slain in battle by the God Emperor himself and its head is still in orbit around Battleworld as a reminder of Doom's power.

== In other media ==
=== Television ===
Knowhere appears in Guardians of the Galaxy (2015).

=== Marvel Cinematic Universe ===
Knowhere as depicted in the 2014 film Guardians of the Galaxy

Knowhere appears in media set in the Marvel Cinematic Universe (MCU). This version initially serves as the Collector's headquarters, in which his Tivan Corporation mines cellular material to sell on the black market, before it is later sold to the Guardians of the Galaxy, who convert it into their headquarters.

- In Thor: The Dark World (2013), Sif and Volstagg travel to Knowhere to give the Collector the Reality Stone for safekeeping.
- In Guardians of the Galaxy (2014), Gamora, Peter Quill, Drax, Rocket, and Groot visit Knowhere to sell an orb to the Collector, during which they learn that it contains the Power Stone.
- In Avengers: Infinity War (2018), Gamora, Quill, Drax, and Mantis travel to Knowhere in an unsuccessful attempt to stop Thanos from claiming the Reality Stone.
- An alternate timeline version of Knowhere appears in the What If...? episode "What If... T'Challa Became a Star-Lord?" (2021).
- In The Guardians of the Galaxy Holiday Special (2022), the Guardians, along with their new member Cosmo, renovate Knowhere following the events of Infinity War before holding a Christmas celebration for Quill.
- In Guardians of the Galaxy Vol. 3 (2023), the Guardians have successfully made Knowhere their headquarters. They later use it as a mobile starship to combat the High Evolutionary. After defeating him and rescuing his captives, Drax and Nebula leave the Guardians to raise the High Evolutionary's captives on Knowhere.

=== Video games ===
- Knowhere appears in Disney Infinity 2.0.
- Knowhere, merged with the Strider series' Third Moon to become Knowmoon, appears as a stage in Marvel vs. Capcom: Infinite.
- Knowhere appears in Lego Marvel Super Heroes 2.
- Knowhere appears in Guardians of the Galaxy: The Telltale Series.
- Knowhere appears in Marvel's Guardians of the Galaxy.
- Knowhere will appear in Marvel Tokon: Fighting Souls.

== Reception ==
Russ Burlingame considered the rendering of Knowhere "one of the most striking and potentially bizarre images" from the Guardians of the Galaxy movie trailer.

David S. Silverman and Douglas Brode described Knowhere as a "criminal lair" at "the fringes of space". They considered the setting a modern incarnation of the frontier of classic Western films, "a place where outlaws and renegades skirt the trappings of society far from the dictates of civilization".

== Bibliography ==
- Nova (vol. 4) #8 and #9 (published November and December 2007)
- Guardians of the Galaxy (vol. 2) #1 (published May 2008)
- Guardians of the Galaxy (vol. 2) #8 (published December 2008)
- Deadpool (vol. 6) #30 (published May 2017)
