= Cole Black =

American comic by Rocky Hartberg

Cole Black Comix

Publication information
- Publisher: Rocky Hartberg Productions
- Schedule: about Quarterly
- Format: Finite ongoing series
- Publication date: 1976 - 2006
- No. of issues: 10+
- Main character(s): Cole Black; Mickey Moorlock

Creative team
- Written by: Rocky Hartberg
- Artist(s): Rocky Hartberg
- Penciller(s): Rocky Hartberg
- Inker(s): Rocky Hartberg

Cole Black is an alternative comic book hard-boiled detective created by Rocky Hartberg in 1976. The detective first appeared in the self-published full-sheet newspaper-sized Cole Black Comix #1 (1976) which had a print run of only 200 copies, all distributed in the Aberdeen, South Dakota area. Hartberg submitted Cole Black to Marvel Comics for inclusion in Epic Magazine in the late-1970s. Although Marvel initially like the concept and accepted the submission, changes in editorial direction at Epic Illustrated scrapped the project.

In 1980, Hartberg initiated a second Cole Black series, this time in newspaper comic strip format. Between 1980 and 1983, five issues of Cole Black were published in this format. Each of these issues had national distribution and circulated between 1,000 and 1,500 copies. Informed by Bud Plant and other comics distributors that the newspaper strip format was limiting sales, Hartberg prepared African Dream in traditional comic book format. Although intended for publication in 1984 as the concluding chapter of the first story arc, African Dream was dropped in favor of a less fantastic World War II tale. The previously unpublished story was printed in a limited edition by Boardman Books (USA) prior to the sale of Hartberg's original art.

Cole Black returned in volume two in traditional comic format. Although exact numbers are unknown, about 15,000 copies of volume 2, number 1, were distributed worldwide. Two more issues followed in the same format in 1985–1986. Unfortunately, Cole Black was caught in the black and white implosion of the mid-1980s when the highly speculative market for independent black and white comics crashed.

Although poor sales forced Rocky Hartberg to abandon Cole Black in 1986, several full unpublished issues were already finished. Boardman Books (USA) published African Dream as Cole Black: the Missing Issue in September 2006, and in December 2006, they released Cole Black Comics (ISSN 1935-0023) volume 2, number 4, "Charge of the Lady Brigade," cover dated Spring 2007, using art work finished in 1986.

== Sources ==
- Matthew H. Gore, "The Thirty Year History of Cole Black," Cole Black Comics, vol. 2, no. 4 (Boardman Books (USA), 2007).
