= Daniele Panebarco =

Italian cartoonist (born 1946)

- Born: 4 October 1946 (age 79); Ravenna, Italy
- Occupation: Cartoonist

Daniele Panebarco (born 4 October 1946) is an Italian cartoonist.

Born in Ravenna, while he was still being a student at the University of Bologna Panebarco debuted as a cartoonist for the magazine Off-Side. In 1973 he won a national contest for cartoonists organized by the newspaper Paese Sera and started collaborating with the newspaper.

In 1976 Panebarco had his breakout with the critically acclaimed noir-humorous series Big Sleeping, which debuted in the magazine Il Mago, and was later published in a large number of other publications. He later created other series, such as Piccolo Lenin, an imaginary account of the Vladimir Lenin's childhood, and Nick Martello, a satire of Communism.

Panebarco is also active in the field of animation (the TV-series Good Morning Osvaldo, 1988) and in the video-game design. In 1995 he founded the company Panebarco & C., specialized in 2-D and 3-D graphics and animation.
