= Nilus (comics) =

Italian comic

Publication information
- Genre: Humor/comedy
- Publication date: 1976

Nilus is an Italian comic strip created by Agostino and Franco Origone. It is considered among the most famous and successful comic strips ever created in Italy.

Nilus was created in 1976 for the magazine Il Mago, then it was published in many newspapers, magazines and collector books. In 1979 the comic book Nilus - tutti gli uomini del faraone (literally "Nilus, All the Pharaoh's Men") won the Dattero d'oro at the International Festival of the Humor of Bordighera.

The comic strip is set in ancient Egypt, and satirically parodies the modern society, showing a dull and fat pharaoh struggling with modern problems such as fiscal instability, inflation, unemployment, energy crisis.
