= Il Mago =

Defunct Italian comics magazine

Il Mago was an Italian comics magazine created by Mario Spagnol and published monthly by Mondadori from April 1972 to December 1980. It published 105 issues.

== History ==
Il Mago was Mondadori's reply to the successful magazine Linus, published by Rizzoli. The director was Mario Spagnol, also editor of the Oscar Mondadori, which previously had frequently featured comic books. After six months, he was replaced by writers Fruttero and Lucentini, who had previously been the Italian translators of the comic strips B.C. and The Wizard of Id. Apart the latter, the magazine featured strips such as Mafalda and Blondie, with a circulation of c. 80,000 copies.

In 1975, the magazine, now in crisis, was handed over to Beppi Zancan. The format was reduced from 24×34 to 19,5×27 cm, and the number of pages was reduced from 96 to 80. Zancan also introduced more adult characters, also open to Italian ones such as Agostino e Franco Origone's Nilus and Daniele Panebarco's Big Sleeping.

The magazine was closed by Mondadori in 1980. Zancan relaunched it in 1983 under Publimilano's aegis, but the new stint lasted for only five issues.

== See also ==
- List of magazines published in Italy
