= Ric Estrada =

American novelist (1928–2009)

- Ric Estrada self-portrait (2001)
- Born: February 26, 1928 Havana, Cuba
- Died: May 1, 2009 (aged 81)
- Areas: Writer, Penciller, Inker
- Awards: Inkpot Award 2000

Ric Estrada (February 26, 1928 – May 1, 2009) was a Cuban-American comics artist who worked for companies including the major American publisher DC Comics. He also worked in comic strips, political cartoons, advertising, storyboarding, and commercial illustration.

== Biography ==
=== Early life and career ===
Ric Estrada was born in Havana, Cuba. He made his first professional sale, an illustration used on the cover of the Cuban magazine Bohemia, at the age of 13. Estrada attended the University of Havana. Through his uncle, Estrada met writer Ernest Hemingway; the two men facilitated Estrada's move to New York City in 1947 to further his artistic studies and start a career. Estrada there attended the New York Art Students League, New York University, and the School of Visual Arts. Estrada's first New York home was in Greenwich Village where he met fellow artists such as Lee J. Ames, Dan Barry, Sy Barry, Frank Frazetta, André LeBlanc, Mort Meskin, Pete Morisi, Don Perlin, and George Roussos.

=== Comic books ===
In the 1950s, Estrada penciled and inked "Bunker", the first comic-book story to feature an African-American hero, and "Rough Riders". Both stories were for the EC Comics series Two-Fisted Tales. He drew for Dell Comics, Hillman Periodicals, St. John Publications, and Ziff Davis. In the late 1950s, he drew almost half the satirical articles of the first two issues of the Mad magazine imitator Frantic. After that, Estrada moved to Germany, where he stayed for three years. He did political cartoons for the Spandauer Volksblatt in the morning and did storyboards for the advertising company Deutschen Documentar in the afternoons.

In 1967 and 1968, he drew stories for Warren Publishing's black-and-white horror comics magazine Eerie. Much of Estrada's comic book career after returning from Germany was spent working for DC Comics. Though superheroes were not his preference, Estrada worked on Superman, Batman, Wonder Woman, Wonder Girl, and Richard Dragon, and he co-created Lady Shiva and Power Girl. Estrada drew detective comics, romance comics, war comics and a few horror stories for DC. In 1976, Estrada's work was in such high demand from DC that he illustrated the premiere issues of six separate titles that year: All Star Comics, Blitzkrieg, Freedom Fighters, Isis, Karate Kid, and Super Friends.

Estrada's preference was for the war stories. Among the war titles he worked on for DC Comics was G.I. Combat, for which he illustrated a number of stories in the ongoing features "Blitzkrieg" and "Robert Kanigher's Gallery of War", both written by Robert Kanigher.

While working on G.I. Combat #169 (Feb. 1974), Estrada filled a page shortage with an account from the Book of Ether, a short book of scripture contained in the Book of Mormon. That story came to the attention of Hugh W. Pinnock, who was in charge of creating a comic-style adaptation of the New Testament for the Church of Jesus Christ of Latter-day Saints, and in 1980 Estrada drew all the pictures for that book.

=== Comic strips and animation ===
Estrada drew the Flash Gordon syndicated newspaper comic strip in sporadic stints from the 1950s to the 1970s. In the 1980s, he collaborated on the animated television series He-Man and the Masters of the Universe, Galtar, The New Adventures of Jonny Quest, and Bionic Six.

=== Death ===
Estrada died May 1, 2009, at 81, after a lengthy battle with prostate cancer.

== Awards ==
Ric Estrada received an Inkpot Award in 2000.

== Bibliography ==
=== Atlas ===
- Devilina #1–2 (1975)
- Phoenix #4 (1975)

=== DC Comics ===
- Adventure Comics #445–447 (1976)
- All-Star Comics #58–59 (1975)
- Amazing World of DC Comics #11 (1976)
- Amethyst #1–3, 5–7, Annual #1 (1984–1985)
- Beowulf #6 (1976)
- Blackhawk #246–247, 249–250 (1976–1977)
- Blitzkrieg #1–5 (1976)
- DC 100-Page Super Spectacular #5 (1971)
- DC Special Series #8, 13 (1978)
- Doorway to Nightmare #3 (1978)
- Elvira's House of Mystery #6, 8 (1986)
- Falling in Love #99, 104–106, 108, 111–112, 114 (1968–1970)
- Freedom Fighters #1 (1976)
- G.I. Combat #141, 144, 157, 159, 169, 171, 174–176, 178–179, 181–187, 192, 194–195, 197, 201, 205–207 (1970–1978)
- Ghosts #97, 102, 105 (1981)
- Girls' Love Stories #137–141, 147–149, 153–154, 178 (1968–1973)
- Girls' Romances #124, 140, 144–145, 148–149, 152, 155–156, 158 (1967–1971)
- Heart Throbs #123–126 (1969–1970)
- Hot Wheels #2–6 (1970–1971)
- House of Mystery #190, 254–255, 292, 304 (1971–1981)
- Isis #1 (1976)
- Karate Kid #1–11 (1976–1977)
- Legion of Super-Heroes #261 (1980)
- Our Army at War #41, 213–216, 222, 224–225, 228, 234, 239, 253, 263–264, 268–274, 276–279, 282–283, 285–287, 289, 292, 294, 297, 299, 301 (1955–1977)
- Our Fighting Forces #126, 132–133, 135, 140, 142, 145, 164–165 (1970–1976)
- Plop #10, 16, 18, 24 (1975–1976)
- Richard Dragon, Kung-Fu Fighter #4–18 (1975–1977)
- Rima, the Jungle Girl #6 (1969)
- Secret Hearts #136, 141–142, 144, 148, 151 (1969–1971)
- Secrets of Haunted House #37, 45–46 (1981–1982)
- Sgt. Rock #302, 306, 313, 315, 322, 327, 331, 336–337, 341 (full art); #342 (inks over Dick Ayers) (1977–1980)
- Showcase #86, 104 (1969–1978)
- Star Spangled War Stories #148–150, 165, 175, 179 (1969–1974)
- Super DC Giant S-21 (1971)
- Super Friends #1–2 (1976)
- Super-Team Family #2–3 (1975–1976)
- Superboy & the Legion of Super-Heroes #232, 234 (1977)
- The Unexpected #192, 195, 215, 219 (1979–1982)
- Unknown Soldier #205–207, 220, 230, 243–245, 254–256, 260–261 (1977–1982)
- Weird War Tales #40, 56, 60, 74, 80–81, 83, 89, 99, 105, 123–124 (1975–1983)
- Welcome Back, Kotter #3–7 (full art); #9–10 (inks over Bob Oksner)
- Wonder Woman #207–211, 262, 265–266 (1973–1980)
- World's Finest Comics #251, 265 (1978–1980)
- Young Love #122, 124 (1976–1977)
- Young Romance #155, 160, 162–163, 165–168, 170, 191 (1968–1973)

=== EC Comics ===
- Frontline Combat #11 (1953)
- Two-Fisted Tales #30 (1952)

=== Eclipse Comics ===
- DNAgents #16 (1984)

=== Warren ===
- Eerie #12, 16 (1967–1968)

=== Ziff Davis ===
- Bill Stern's Sports Book #2 (1952)

Preceded by Don Heck	Wonder Woman artist 1973–1974	Succeeded by Curt Swan
Preceded by Jack Kirby	Richard Dragon, Kung-Fu Fighter artist 1975–1977	Succeeded by n/a
Preceded by George Evans	Blackhawk artist 1976–1977	Succeeded by Dan Spiegle (in 1982)
