= Rocky Hartberg =

Rocky Ray Hartberg is an American underground comic and commercial artist residing in Langford, South Dakota. He graduated from Northern State University in (Aberdeen, South Dakota) in 1975 with an art degree. In 2003, Hartberg received a second art degree from Northern.

He is best known for his hard-boiled detective, Cole Black, featured in a variety of comix between 1976 and 2006. These comics include Cole Black Comix (1976), Cole Black Comics (1980–1984), Cole Black (1985–1986), Cole Black: the Missing Issue (2006), and Cole Black Comics (2006). Other comic books by Hartberg include Lonesome Cowboy Comix (1977) and White Knight Comics (1978). His work can also be found in a number of fanzines, mostly in the late-1970s and early-1980s.

In the early-1980s, the market for small independent comics flourished driven by the success of Cerebus the Aardvark and the Teenage Mutant Ninja Turtles. Investors hoping to cash in on the next black and white success were quick to purchase new issues, and new black and white titles flooded the comic shop market. However, this craze was short lived and the resulting black and white comics implosion in the mid-1980s damaged the circulation of Cole Black. Distribution problems forced the cancellation of the comic with issue #3 of the 1985 series. Three additional issues of Cole Black were finished but remained unpublished for 20 years.

In the mid-1980s, Hartberg owned and operated a comic book store Aberdeen's Super City Shopping Mall. Through this business, Hartberg was able to share his love of comic and graphic art and storytelling. Some of the stories that were being published during this time include Frank Miller's initial Daredevil run, John Byrne's Alpha Flight and Fantastic Four, Alan Moore's Swamp Thing, Frank Miller's The Dark Knight Returns, and George Pérez's Teen Titans.

Hartberg continued to work in independent comics for several years but in 1991 turned to commercial art and "colorful and action-packed acrylic paintings." In 2006, Boardman Books in Tennessee published one of the abandoned stories as Cole Black volume 1, number 6: the Missing Issue.
