= DC Super Stars =

- Cover of DC Super Stars #1 (March 1976), art by Nick Cardy

Publication information
- Publisher: DC Comics
- Schedule: Monthly (issues #1–12); Bi-monthly (issues #13–18)
- Format: Standard
- Publication date: March 1976 – January/February 1978
- No. of issues: 18

Creative team
- Written by: List: Sergio Aragonés, Cary Bates, Steve Clement, Gerry Conway, Jack C. Harris, Robert Kanigher, Paul Kupperberg, Paul Levitz, David Michelinie, Dennis O'Neil, Martin Pasko, Bob Rozakis, Steve Skeates
- Penciller: List: Sergio Aragonés, Dick Ayers, Rich Buckler, Ed Davis, Dick Dillin, Lee Elias, Mike Grell, Don Newton, Juan Ortiz, Joe Staton, Curt Swan, Romeo Tanghal
- Inker: List: Jack Abel, Murphy Anderson, Sergio Aragonés, Dick Giordano, Bob Layton, Frank McLaughlin, Bruce D. Patterson, Josef Rubinstein, Bob Smith, Romeo Tanghal
- Editor: List: E. Nelson Bridwell (issues #1–8), Jack C. Harris (issue #9), Julius Schwartz (issue #10), Carl Gafford (issue #11), Paul Levitz (issues #12–15 and #17–18), Joe Orlando (issue #16)

DC Super Stars was a comics anthology series published by DC Comics from March 1976 to February 1978. Starting off as a reprint title, it finished its run with original stories.

== Publication history ==
The tagline "The Line of DC Super-Stars" was used as a brand emblem on comic books published by DC Comics beginning in December 1973 and ending January 1977. The DC Super Stars series began with a March 1976 cover date. A recurring feature of the title's early run was "DC Super-Stars of Space", special issues reprinting Silver Age science-fiction stories starring such characters as Adam Strange, Hawkman, the Atomic Knights, Space Cabbie, Captain Comet, Tommy Tomorrow, the Star Rovers, and Space Ranger.

The series' middle period was marked by theme issues — Aquaman, heroes with guns, sports, magic-users — until issue #12, which heralded the title's second original story, featuring Superboy. From that point until DC Super Stars was cancelled after issue #18, the series contained new stories about a range of different characters (some being showcased for their own titles), as well as a collection of "secret origin" stories. The Bronze Age Huntress made her first appearance in DC Super Stars #17 (November/December 1977) in a story written by Paul Levitz and drawn by Joe Staton and Bob Layton.

== Collected editions ==
- Superboy and the Legion of Super-Heroes Vol. 1 includes the Legion of Super-Heroes story from DC Super Stars #17, 312 pages, June 2017, 978-1401272913
- Batman in the Seventies includes the Huntress story from DC Super Stars #17, 192 pages, January 2000, 978-1563895654
- Huntress: Dark Knight Daughter includes the Huntress story from DC Super Stars #17, 224 pages, December 2006, 978-1401209131
- Catwoman: A Celebration of 75 Years includes the Huntress story from DC Super Stars #17, 408 pages, November 2015, 978-1401260064
- Showcase Presents: Phantom Stranger Vol. 2 includes the Phantom Stranger and Deadman story from DC Super Stars #18, 552 pages, March 2008, 978-1401217228
- Deadman Vol. 3 includes the Phantom Stranger and Deadman story from DC Super Stars #18, 176 pages, December 2012, 978-1401237288
- Deadman Omnibus includes the Phantom Stranger and Deadman story from DC Super Stars #18, 944 pages, December 2020, 978-1779504883

== See also ==
- DC Special
- DC Special Series
- Four-Star Spectacular
- List of DC Comics publications
