= Big Sleeping =

Italian comics series

- A cover of Il Mago featuring Big Sleeping
- Genre: CrimeHumor/comedy

Creative team
- Created by: Daniele Panebarco

Big Sleeping is an Italian noir-humorous comic series created by Daniele Panebarco.

== History and profile ==
Inspired by Raymond Chandler's novels, the main character of the series is a private detective loosely based on Philip Marlowe. The series featured typical noir and hard-boiled elements mixed with surreal and humorous plots, such as the research of Godot, or the thief of the Christmas Star.

The series debuted in the magazine Il Mago, and was later published in a large number of other publications including linus, Orient Express, Comic Art and L'espresso. Big Sleeping was also featured in several graphic novels, the first of them being Il Falcone Sardese (Longanesi, 1977), which featured the killing of Italian Communist Party secretary Enrico Berlinguer and his replacement with a double appointed to kill the American president Jimmy Carter during a public event.

The appearance of the main character and the graphic rendering of the comics significantly evolved over the course of publications, from an early roundish and "boterian" style to a more stretched and realistic drawing.
