= Sphinx (Marvel Comics) =

- The Sphinx (right) battles the Thing on the cover of The Thing #34 (April 1986), art by Kim DeMulder.

Publication information
- Publisher: Marvel Comics
- First appearance: (Anath-Na): Nova #6 (Feb. 1977) (Karim): The New Warriors #4 (Aug. 1990)
- Created by: (Anath-Na): Marv Wolfman and Sal Buscema (Karim): Fabian Nicieza

In-story information
- Alter ego: Anath-Na Mut; Meryet Karim
- Species: Human Mutant
- Notable aliases: (Anath-Na): The Dreaded One; Omni-Sphinx (Karim): Lady Sphinx
- Abilities: (Anath-Na): Superhuman strength, stamina, and durability; Flight; Energy manipulation; Telepathy; Immortality; (Karim): Reality warping

The Sphinx is the name of two fictional characters appearing in American comic books published by Marvel Comics.

== Publication history ==
The male version of Sphinx first appeared in Nova #6 (Feb. 1977) and was created by Marv Wolfman and Sal Buscema.

The female version of Sphinx first appeared in The New Warriors #4 (Aug. 1990) and was created by Fabian Nicieza.

== Fictional character biography ==
=== Anath-Na Mut ===
Anath-Na Mut is a chief wizard in the court of Ramesses II in ancient Egypt. Defeated in a magic duel by the prophet Moses, Anath-Na was exiled into the desert for his failure. The title Nova recounts in a flashback of how Anath-Na discovered the mystic Ka Stone, which grants him immortality and superhuman powers. Under the alias Sphinx, Anath-Na wanders Earth for a thousand years, but becomes bored of his immortal life. After learning about the origins of Richard Rider, aliens from planet Xandar, and their sentient machine, Sphinx theorizes that he can use Xandar's Living Computer to finally die.

In a Fantastic Four Annual, Sphinx empowers a pawn known as Thraxon to help subdue the Inhumans. He utilizes ruler Black Bolt's electron energy to amplify a scanning device and read all the minds in everyone for knowledge of how Sphinx could finally die. The Fantastic Four defeat Thraxon and in a final confrontation, Black Bolt blasts him into deep space. Sphinx reappears in the Nova series, taking mental control of Nova, and along with his temporary allies (Comet, Crimebuster, Diamondhead, Powerhouse, and Doctor Sun), they travel back to Xandar and join a war against the invading Skrulls.

Once on Xandar, Sphinx takes advantage of the war to absorb knowledge from its planet-size computer. Evolving into a god, Sphinx decides to destroy Earth. Knowing that he is outmatched, Mister Fantastic contacts the cosmic entity Galactus and presents a proposal — if he stops Sphinx, then Mister Fantastic will release him from his vow to not devour Earth. He accepts and, when the group finds Galactus a new herald (Terrax), they travel to Earth again. After Galactus defeats Sphinx, he crushes the Ka Stone and sends Anath-Na back in time to ancient Egypt. Anath-Na is trapped in a time loop, forcing him to constantly relive his life up to this point.

Anath-Na relives his life several times due to a chronal flaw, until he meets his past self. The two build a machine to reconstruct the Ka Stone. After hypnotizing his past self so that he will not remember their meeting, Anath-Na enters suspended animation. He awakens after Galactus departs and begins to rebuild the Ka Stone. The Thing battles Sphinx to a standstill, destroys his machine, and leaves him with an incomplete Ka Stone. The Puppet Master forces Sphinx to crush the Ka Stone, which causes Anath-Na to immediately age 5,000 years before turning into dust.

=== Meryet Karim ===
Meryet Karim is a desert nomad who finds an unconscious Anath-Na Mut soon after he finds the Ka Stone. While nursing him back to health, Karim absorbs residual energies from the Ka Stone, which grants her a fraction of its powers and allows her to continuously reincarnate while retaining the knowledge of her previous lives. In the modern era, she finds the Ka Scepter's remnants and reconstructs it to become the new Sphinx. Then, Karim alters history so Anath-Na will kill Moses and conquer Earth. Sphinx is thwarted by the New Warriors and resurrects Anath-Na in a bid to reclaim his love. The empowered Sphinx battles the New Warriors, but when facing his feelings for Karim, he merges with her into a composite entity who goes back in time to live a normal life.

== Powers, abilities, and equipment ==
The Anath-Na incarnation of Sphinx is a mutant who gained additional powers through use of the Ka Stone and possibly other sources. He has supernatural strength, stamina, and durability, as well as virtual immortality. Courtesy of the jewel's mystical properties, Anath-Na also has a range of metaphysical abilities, including energy control, mind reading, hypersonic flight, and knowledge absorption. The Meryet Karim incarnation of Sphinx possesses nigh-omnipotence after imbuing herself with energies from the Ka Scepter. Both versions of Sphinx have expertise in Egyptian magic.

== In other media ==
The Meryet Karim incarnation of Sphinx appears in Lego Marvel Avengers: Strange Tails, voiced by Alia Shawkat. This version is a social media influencer who is empowered by an idol belonging to Anath-Na Mut.
