= Nova (Richard Rider) =

Marvel Comics fictional character

- Textless cover of Nova (vol. 4) #1 (April 2007), art by Adi Granov

Publication information
- Publisher: Marvel Comics
- First appearance: The Man Called Nova #1 (September 1976)
- Created by: Marv Wolfman; John Romita Sr.

In-story information
- Alter ego: Richard Rider
- Species: Human
- Place of origin: Earth
- Team affiliations: United Front; New Warriors; Defenders; Champions of Xandar; Secret Avengers; Nova Corps; Guardians of the Galaxy; Brotherhood of Arakko
- Notable aliases: Nova Prime; Kid Nova; Nova #11249-44396 the Human Rocket; Quasar
- Abilities: Expert hand to hand combatant; Access to the Nova Force: Currently in possession via download of the Xandarian Worldmind which allows him near-infinite control over the Nova Force granting energy projection and absorption; Superhuman strength, speed, durability, agility, and reflexes; Ability to exert influence over gravitational forces and open wormholes; Regenerative healing factor; Flight

Richard "Rich" Rider, also known as Nova, is a superhero appearing in American comic books published by Marvel Comics. The character appeared historically as the star of his own series, and at other times, as a supporting character in team books such as The New Warriors. He is a member of the intergalactic police force known as the Nova Corps. He has access to the Nova Force and superhuman abilities including enhanced strength, flight and resistance to injury.

== Publication history ==
The character was created in 1966 by writer Marv Wolfman in issue #3 of his fanzine Super Adventures. Then known as the Star, he was an alien doctor named Denteen who found a spaceship containing pills which gave him a different superhuman power every five minutes. In issue #6, Wolfman and writer Len Wein reimagined the character, now a prisoner named Kraken Roo who turns out to become the superhero Black Nova. Years later, Wolfman (working for Marvel Comics) and artist John Romita Sr. tweaked the design of the character's uniform and created a new origin story.

Nova debuted in The Man Called Nova #1 (Sept. 1976), written by Wolfman and drawn by John Buscema. Wolfman intended the teenage character to be an homage to Stan Lee and Steve Ditko's Spider-Man, down to his humble working-class roots and alliterative alter-ego. The original series lasted 25 issues from September 1976 to May 1979. Dangling plot lines were resolved in issues #206-214 of Fantastic Four (also by Wolfman) and issue #24 of Rom: Spaceknight. The character then disappeared into obscurity until returning as a member of the original New Warriors team debuting in The Mighty Thor #411 (December 1989), and continuing through The New Warriors #1-75 and Annuals #1-4 (July 1990—September 1996).

Following two subsequent Nova titles, Nova (vol. 2) #1-18 (Jan. 1994-June 1995) and Nova the Human Rocket (vol. 3) #1-7 (May.-Nov. 1999), Nova would return in The New Warriors (vol. 2) #0-10 (Oct. 1999—July 2000) and New Warriors (vol. 3) #1-6 (July 2005-Dec. 2005). After a four-issue miniseries titled Annihilation: Nova and a leading role in Annihilation #1-6, Nova (vol. 4) ran for 36 issues (April 2007-April 2010). This series tied into Annihilation: Conquest, Secret Invasion, and War of Kings. After the cancellation of Nova (vol. 4), some remaining plot threads were addressed in The Thanos Imperative, a six-issue miniseries with two bookend one-shots (May 2010-Feb. 2011).

Nova appeared as a member of the Secret Avengers during the first four issues of that team's eponymous series (May - Aug. 2010).

Nova appears in a Guardians of the Galaxy storyline running from August to October 2014, an Original Sin tie-in featuring a flashback to events immediately following The Thanos Imperative.

== Fictional character biography ==
=== Original series ===
Cover to The Man Called Nova #1, art by Rich Buckler and Joe Sinnott

When the last surviving member of the planet Xandar's elite Nova Corps, Rhomann Dey, is dying, he selects New York high school student Richard Rider to replace him. Rider is given the uniform and powers of a Nova Centurion, but little instruction on how to use them. Calling himself Nova, Rider becomes a superhero, fighting costumed supervillains such as the Condor, Powerhouse, Diamondhead, the Corruptor, and the Sphinx, and teaming with heroes such as Spider-Man and Thor. He initially hides his identity, but later reveals it to his family.

Rider discovers Dey's spaceship orbiting Earth and uses it to journey to Xandar with Doctor Sun, Powerhouse, Comet, the Crimebuster and the Sphinx, where they join the Xandarians' war against the Skrulls. With the help of Rom the Space Knight, the Skrulls are defeated. Wanting to return to Earth, Rider is released from his duties on Xandar and relinquishes his powers.

=== The New Warriors ===
Upon his return to Earth, Rider struggles to readjust due to his failure to complete high school. Unknown to him, Xandar is destroyed in an attack by the space pirate Nebula. With the help of Night Thrasher, Rider regains his powers and joins the New Warriors superhero team, where he becomes close friends with Speedball. Richard briefly dates Yale student Laura Dunham and teammate Namorita.

Cover to The New Warriors #75, pencils by Patrick Zircher

Rider encounters Garthan Saal, a former Nova Corps Centurion who had been driven insane by absorbing too much of the Nova Force, the source of power for Nova Centurions. Saal seeks more power so he can restore Xandar to its former glory. He strips Rider of his powers and transports him to Xandar. Saal is defeated. Rider witnesses the reformation of the Nova Corps and receives the rank of Centurion Prime.

Assigned to Earth, Rider is confronted with the challenge of balancing dual lives as a member of both the Nova Corps and the New Warriors. Rider encounters a Nova Corps member from an alternate timeline named Nova 0:0, who prepares him to stop the Deathstorm, which is coming to destroy Earth. Because Rider defies Xandar's Queen Adora to stop the Deathstorm, he is temporarily stripped of his powers and rank, but is given back his powers when his replacement sacrifices himself.

=== Annihilation ===
Nova briefly travels the U.S. with the reformed New Warriors as part of a reality television show. Rider leaves the group when he is summoned to Xandar alongside the entire Nova Corps, which has been fully mobilized to respond to the Annihilation Wave, a force from the Negative Zone led by Annihilus. The wave decimates Xandar and the corps in a surprise attack. As the only surviving centurion, Rider makes contact with the Xandarian Worldmind, a living supercomputer that oversees Xander and regulates the Nova Force. The Worldmind uploads itself and the entire Nova Force into Rider, greatly enhancing his abilities. During the Annihilation War, Rider takes command of the United Front, a loose collaboration of soldiers. In a nearly year-long campaign, Rider resists the Wave's advance across the galaxy until the United Front suffers a swift defeat. He leads a small team into the Wave's conquered territory and eventually engages Annihilus in personal combat, killing him.

After the Annihilation War, Rider returns to Earth to rest. However, finding out that his pleas for help in the Annihilation War were ignored by Earth's superheroes because of a Civil War, and meeting Penance - his old friend Speedball, who was mentally scarred by the events leading up to said war - Rider returns to space, feeling out of place on Earth and disturbed by what Penance had become.

=== Post-Annihilation ===
Attempting to aid the Kree against an assault from the Phalanx, Rider is wounded and crash-lands on a sparsely populated Kree outpost. While Rider's unconscious body recovers, Worldmind deputizes a local Kree commander, Ko-Rel, to guard him. Rider is infected by the transmode virus and joins the Phalanx. Now tasked with killing Rider before the Worldmind falls into enemy hands, Ko-Rel attacks him, only to be killed by Gamora in retaliation. Upon her death, her fraction of the Nova force returns to Rider and enables him to overcome the transmode virus. He flees Kree space pursued by Gamora and a Phalanx-controlled Drax. Seeking a cure for the transmode virus, Rider eventually arrives on Kvch, home planet of the Technarchy. Rider enlists the help of the mutant Warlock and his son Tyro, who cure Rider, Drax, and Gamora of the transmode virus. The five return to Hala to engage the Phalanx.

When ambushed by Skrulls during the Secret Invasion storyline, Rider is aided by Kl'rt the Super-Skrull. He learns about the Secret Invasion and heads for Earth. Rider learns that Project Pegasus, the base where his brother now works, is under Skrull attack. Working with Darkhawk, Rider successfully stops the Skrulls' advance. The scientists of the facility extract the Worldmind from his brain and use the supercomputer to jump-start a project known as the quantum flask, which resurrects Quasar. A Skrull warship is about to attack Project Pegasus, but is destroyed by a band of alien Nova Centurions who declare allegiance to Rider.

Rider learns that the Worldmind has been recruiting members for the Corps without telling him. When he learns that Ego the Living Planet is among the new recruits, he becomes enraged and tries to battle Worldmind. As a result, he is stripped of his rank and ejected from the Nova Corps. Because his body has become dependent on the Nova Force, Rider will die if he is without it for too long. As a temporary measure, he borrows the quantum bands from Wendell Vaughn and becomes Quasar. Using his new abilities, Rider rescues the Corps from the War of Kings. Ego is removed as a Centurion and Rider regains his Nova Prime status, but not before most of the new recruits are killed by the Shi'ar Imperial Guard. Nova agrees to train the remaining new Centurions, including his younger brother Robert.

Nova is recruited for the Secret Avengers by Steve Rogers and sent to Mars to investigate Roxxon's operations on that planet. While there, Rider discovers a second Serpent Crown secreted there, only to fall under its influence until rescued by Rogers and his team of Avengers. Shortly after this mission, Nova is called away to deal with the events of The Thanos Imperative and Steve Rogers confirms he has left the team.

=== Realm of Kings and The Thanos Imperative ===
A lost Nova Corps ship appears from a tear in space-time known as the Fault. Onboard is Zan Philo, a long-missing Nova Centurion who is assigned to train the new recruits. Later, Rider and Darkhawk find themselves inside the Fault, where they are called to do battle for the Sphinx against his younger self. Because of the unstable timestream inside the Fault, Nova is able to return with Namorita, his old girlfriend who had died a few years earlier. Rider returns to Project Pegasus, where he confronts an alternate Quasar who originates from the Cancerverse, a universe within the Fault.

Catching up to the alternate Quasar, Rider returns to the Fault to see the Universal Church of Truth rip it wide open. Assisted by others, he confronts Lord Mar-Vell, the evil alternate version of Captain Marvel, but cannot stop him. Entering the Fault to assist the Guardians of the Galaxy, Rider and the Guardians watch Thanos destroy Mar-Vell. Now facing an enraged Thanos, Rider pulls the Nova Force from the rest of the Corps for extra strength. He and Star-Lord are able to hold Thanos back for the few minutes it takes for the Fault to close, trapping all three of them in the Cancerverse. The two heroes continue to fight Thanos for a Cosmic Cube which has the power to send them home. Rider charges the Cube with the Nova Force to create a doorway for Star-Lord, intending to remain behind and keep Thanos from escaping too. Star-Lord escapes, but Rider is unable to prevent Thanos from escaping as well. Because no one is immediately aware Star-Lord survived, Nova and Star-Lord receive a statue in their honor on Hala.

=== Return ===
The latest Nova, Sam Alexander, locates the Xandarian Worldmind. Rider's consciousness awakens within the Worldmind during the encounter. It is later revealed that Rider and the Worldmind survived the closure of the Fault and remain trapped in the Cancerverse. Using the Nova Force, Rider manages to escape the Cancerverse, returns to Earth to visit his mother, and learns that his father has died. He encounters Alexander and they begin working together. However, in his escape, Rider has become a portal to the Cancerverse, which repeatedly attempts to invade Earth through him. Rider returns to the Cancerverse in hopes of closing the portal and thus saving his own universe. Despite his resistance, he is co-opted by the Cancerverse, but is freed by Alexander, who has followed him. The two escape the Cancerverse once more, using the Cosmic Cube carried by Thanos' Cancerverse doppelganger. Rider and Alexander resume their lives and relationships on Earth while continuing as Nova Corpsmen.

In the aftermath of "Empyre," Nova represents the Nova Corps during a Galactic Council meeting held by Kl'rt the Super-Skrull. When Emperor Stote of the Zn'rx is found dead, Nova calls in the Guardians of the Galaxy to investigate Stote's murder.

== Powers and abilities ==
Nova derives his powers from an energy source called the Nova Force which all Nova Corps Centurions wield. This energy was transferred to Rider by the Nova Centurion Rhomann Dey. The Nova Force affords Rider superhuman powers including flight, superhuman strength, speed, and durability, as well as the power to absorb energy directed against him and release it as gravimetric pulses and beams, either from specific parts of his body or from his entire body. Nova is a good hand-to-hand combatant, and has been coached by Chord.

Nova wears a standard Xandarian StarCorps uniform, designed to accommodate his powers without being damaged by them. The uniform is highly resistant to damage, including outer space conditions, and is airtight. In addition, the uniform has a built-in life support function that can sustain Rider under the most extreme environmental conditions, including acting as a life-support suit by locking off the mouth and eyes of the helmet. The helmet contains a radio, telescopic sights, night vision sensors, and heat imaging sensors, as well as a visual heads-up display for tracking energy signatures. Nova's helmet has a rigid construction and shape when worn, but becomes as malleable as cloth when it is not, allowing Rider to hide it in his civilian clothes when desired. Nova's uniform is not only extremely malleable, but contains specific functions to aid Rider in his role as a Nova Corps Centurion. Among these features are an electromagnetic discharge that can nullify gravity and an interface to stargates that allow him to enter hyperspace, where he can move at velocities exceeding the speed of light. Rider can also alter the appearance and nature of his uniform to suit his needs. However, as Rider learns the hard way, the Nova Corps keeps a strict dress code. When he makes major cosmetic changes to his uniform after rejoining the New Warriors, Nova is summarily ordered to conform to standard.

During "Annihilation", Rider's uniform is altered and enhanced to house the Xandarian Worldmind as well as the entire Nova Force, which was previously used by all members of the Nova Corps. With the Worldmind and the Nova Force, Rider possesses tremendously augmented strength and durability as well as nearly limitless quantities of energy. The Worldmind consists of the entire culture and history of Xandar as well as the individual minds of thousands of years of dead Xandarians. The consensus voice of the Worldmind can speak directly to Rider, helping him to control the Nova Force, fight enemies, sense energy, interface with electronics, and protect against psionic abilities. The Worldmind can also assume direct control of Rider's body when he is asleep.

== Marv Wolfman lawsuit ==
In 1997, on the eve of the impending Blade film, Marv Wolfman sued Marvel Characters Inc. over ownership of all characters he had created for them, including Nova and Blade. A ruling in Marvel's favor was handed down on November 6, 2000. Wolfman's stance was that he had not signed work-for-hire contracts when he created characters including Blade and Nova. In a nonjury trial, the judge ruled that Marvel's later use of the characters was sufficiently different to protect it from Wolfman's claim of copyright ownership.

== Reception ==
=== Accolades ===
- In 2011, IGN ranked Nova 98th in their "Top 100 Comic Book Heroes of All Time" list.
- In 2012, IGN ranked Nova 19th in their "Top 50 Avengers" list.
- In 2017, Den of Geek ranked Nova 2nd in their "Guardians of the Galaxy 3: 50 Marvel Characters We Want to See" list.
- In 2018, CBR.com ranked Nova 1st in their "16 Strongest Nova Corps Members" list, 5th in their "Marvel's Strongest Cosmic Heroes" list, and 15th in their "25 Most Powerful Avengers Ever" list.
- In 2018, CBR.com ranked Nova (Richard Rider) 6th in their "25 Fastest Characters In The Marvel Universe" list.
- In 2022, CBR.com ranked Nova 2nd in their "10 Best Cosmic Heroes in Marvel Comics" list and 11th in their "30 Strongest Marvel Superheroes" list.

== Other versions ==
=== Earth X ===
In the alternate future of Earth X, Nova resides in the afterlife. He and two other deceased heroes, Ms. Marvel and Star-Lord, lead an initial charge against Mephisto, but are swiftly defeated.

=== Forever Yesterday ===
An alternate universe version of Richard Rider appears in the New Warriors storyline Forever Yesterday. This version is the sole Caucasian member of the Avengers, whose members are largely from the Middle East. He initially serves Sphinx, the creator and ruler of his universe, who used the Ka Stone to reshape reality. After being told of his universe's origins, Rider betrays Sphinx and forces her to restore reality to normal.

=== Marvel Zombies ===
Nova is featured in Marvel Zombies: Dead Days. Unable to overcome his fear and horror of the slaughter occurring around him, Nova fails to act in his own defense when Spider-Man attacks him. Daredevil intervenes, but is bitten when Nova is too shocked to assist. He and Thor are rescued by the Fantastic Four and united with the other surviving heroes on the S.H.I.E.L.D. Helicarrier. Nova panics further when Nick Fury formulates a desperate last stand defense, citing that this was nothing like previous global threats; and that the world was as good as dead. Regardless, Nova helps in the battle until he is bitten by Ms. Marvel. Nova is later killed by the cosmic zombies.

=== MC2 ===
The MC2 Nova's first appearance in Spider-Girl #7

An alternate universe version of Richard Rider / Nova from Earth-982 appears in Spider-Girl. This version is a temporary member of the Avengers and mentor of Spider-Girl who inspired her to form a new version of the New Warriors.

=== What If ===
Issue #15 of What If? contained four stories in which a young widow, a homeless man, Peter Parker, and a criminal became Nova instead of Richard Rider.

In What If? Annihilation, the Annihilation Wave reaches Earth in the climactic battle of the super hero Civil War. Nova, Captain America, and Iron Man work together and sacrifice themselves while using a weapon to destroy the Wave and save Earth.

== In other media ==
=== Film ===
- In March 2022, Marvel Studios was revealed to be developing a project featuring Richard Rider / Nova with Sabir Pirzada as writer. In December 2024, Ed Bernero came aboard as showrunner and writer, replacing Pirzada. It would have been a series developed for streaming released on Disney+. By July 2026, the project was re-developed into a film, with Michael Waldron set to write the screenplay.

=== Television ===
- Richard Rider / Nova makes a cameo appearance in The Super Hero Squad Show episode "So Pretty When They Explode!", voiced by Jason Marsden.

=== Video games ===
- Richard Rider / Nova appears as a playable character in Marvel Super Hero Squad: The Infinity Gauntlet, voiced by Jason Marsden.
- Richard Rider / Nova appears as a playable character in Marvel Super Hero Squad Online.
- Richard Rider / Nova appears as a playable character in Ultimate Marvel vs. Capcom 3, voiced by Troy Baker. Additionally, his Quasar and Kid Nova suits are available as alternate skins.
- Richard Rider / Nova appears in Marvel Heroes, voiced again by Troy Baker.
- Richard Rider / Nova appears as a playable character in Marvel vs. Capcom: Infinite, voiced by Benjamin Diskin.
- Richard Rider / Nova appears as a non-playable character in Marvel Ultimate Alliance 3: The Black Order, voiced by Robbie Daymond.
- Richard Rider / Nova appears as a playable character in Marvel: Future Fight.
- Richard Rider / Nova appears in Marvel's Deadpool VR, voiced by Michael Rosenbaum.
- Richard Rider / Nova appears as a playable character in Marvel Cosmic Invasion, voiced by Matthew Mercer.

== Collected editions ==
Title	Material collected	Date	ISBN
Essential Nova	Nova #1-25, Marvel Two-in-One Annual #3, The Amazing Spider-Man #171	April 2006	ISBN 978-0785120933
Nova Classic: Volume 1	Nova #1-12, The Amazing Spider-Man #171	January 2013	ISBN 978-0785160281
Nova Classic: Volume 2	Nova #13-19, The Defenders #62-64, Fantastic Four Annual #12, Marvel Two-in-One Annual #3	December 2013	ISBN 978-0785185444
Nova Classic: Volume 3	Nova #20-25, Fantastic Four #204-206, 208–214	June 2014	ISBN 978-0785185529
Nova Volume 1: Annihilation: Conquest	Nova (vol. 4) #1-7	December 2007	ISBN 0-7851-2631-7
Nova Volume 2: Knowhere	Nova (vol. 4) #8-12 and Annual #1	August 2008	ISBN 0-7851-2632-5
Nova Volume 3: Secret Invasion	Nova (vol. 4) #13-18	March 2009	ISBN 0-7851-2662-7
Nova Volume 4: Nova Corps	Nova (vol. 4) #19-22 and Nova: Origin of Richard Rider	May 2009	ISBN 0-7851-3188-4
Nova Volume 5: War of Kings	Nova (vol. 4) #23-28	December 2009	ISBN 0-7851-4066-2
Nova Volume 6: Realm of Kings	Nova (vol. 4) #29-36	June 2010	ISBN 0-7851-4067-0
Nova by Abnett & Lanning: The Complete Collection Volume 1	Annihilation: Nova #1-4, Nova (vol. 4) #1-15, Annual #1, material from Nova: Origin of Richard Rider	July 31, 2018	ISBN 978-1302911348
Nova by Abnett & Lanning: The Complete Collection Volume 2	Nova (vol. 4) #16-36, material from I Am An Avenger	December 31, 2018	ISBN 978-1302915551
Nova Volume 1: Origin	Nova (vol. 5) #1-5	March 11, 2014	ISBN 978-0785166054
Nova Volume 2: Rookie Season	Nova (vol. 5) #6-9, 10 (A story)	March 25, 2014	ISBN 978-0785168393
Nova Volume 3: Nova Corpse	Nova (vol. 5) #10 (B story), 11–16	June 10, 2014	ISBN 978-0785189572
Nova Volume 4: Original Sin	Nova (vol. 5) #17-22	January 6, 2015	ISBN 978-0785189589
Nova Volume 5: AXIS	Nova (vol. 5) #23-27	May 5, 2015	ISBN 978-0785192411
Nova Volume 6: Homecoming	Nova (vol. 5) #28-31, Nova Annual (vol.2) # 1	November 10, 2015	ISBN 978-0785193753
Nova: The Human Rocket Volume 1: Burn Out	Nova (vol. 6) #1-6	June 14, 2016	ISBN 978-0785196501
Nova: The Human Rocket Volume 2: Afterburn	Nova (vol. 6) #7-11	January 10, 2017	ISBN 978-0785196518
Nova: Resurrection	Nova (vol. 7) #1-7	July 26, 2017	ISBN 978-1302905293
Annihiliation: Scourge	Annihilation Scourge: Alpha, Nova, Silver Surfer, Beta Ray Bill, Fantastic Four and Omega	March 24, 2020	978-1302921699

== Sources ==
- Smith, Doug (2009). "Flashback: The Man Called Nova". Back Issue #33. Raleigh: Twomorrows. ISSN 1932-6904.
