= In My Eyes =

In My Eyes may refer to:

- In My Eyes (EP), a 1981 EP by Minor Threat, or the title song
- In My Eyes (Stevie B album), a 1988 album by American freestyle/dance musician Stevie B
  - "In My Eyes" (Stevie B song), a 1988 song from the above album
- In My Eyes (John Conlee album), 1983
- "In My Eyes" (Conway Twitty song), 1982, covered by John Conlee
- "In My Eyes" (Lionel Cartwright song), a 1989 single by American country music singer Lionel Cartwright
- In My Eyes (band), an American straight edge band named after the Minor Threat song
- "In My Eyes", a 2013 song by The Afters from the album Life is Beautiful
- "In My Eyes", a 1999 single by Belgian vocal trance band Milk Inc.

== See also ==
- In Your Eyes (disambiguation)
