= List of Ultimate Spider-Man episodes =

Ultimate Spider-Man is an animated television series based on the superhero Spider-Man. The series premiered on Disney XD on April 1, 2012, airing alongside the second season of The Avengers: Earth's Mightiest Heroes, as part of the Marvel Universe block. The series is based on the Ultimate Spider-Man comic book series.

During the course of the series, 104 episodes of Ultimate Spider-Man aired over four seasons, between April 1, 2012, and January 7, 2017.

== Series overview ==
Season	Title	Episodes	Originally released	
Season	Title	Episodes	First released	Last released
1	–	26	April 1, 2012	October 28, 2012
2	–	26	January 21, 2013	November 21, 2013
3	Web-Warriors	26	March 13, 2014	October 24, 2015
4	vs. the Sinister 6	26	February 21, 2016	January 7, 2017

== Episodes ==
=== Season 1 (2012) ===
No. overall	No. in season	Title	Directed by	Written by	Original release date	US viewers (millions)
1	1	"Great Power"	Alex Soto, Phil Pignotti & Tim Eldered	Paul Dini	April 1, 2012	0.98
High school student Peter Parker has been fighting crime in New York City as the masked vigilante Spider-Man for one year. Nick Fury, director of international peace-keeping agency S.H.I.E.L.D., approaches him with an offer to train with S.H.I.E.L.D. and become part of a new superhero team that is being assembled following Spider-Man's apprehension of Frightful Four member Trapster. Spider-Man at first declines the offer, but after his school Midtown High is attacked by the rest of the Frightful Four (consisting of Wizard, Thundra, and Klaw) on behalf of Doctor Octopus and Norman Osborn, he starts to wonder if he really should have declined.
2	2	"Great Responsibility"	Alex Soto, Phil Pignotti & Tim Eldered	Paul Dini	April 1, 2012	0.96
Spider-Man finally accepts Nick Fury's offer to help train him to become the "Ultimate Spider-Man", as well as having him lead a team of 4 young heroes in training to prove his leadership skills. He meets Power Man, Iron Fist, Nova and White Tiger at the time when the remaining Frightful Four members attack. As an added bonus, Nick Fury has positioned S.H.I.E.L.D. Agent Phil Coulson at Midtown High to be the acting principal.
3	3	"Doomed!"	Gary Hartle & Jeff Allen	Man of Action	April 8, 2012	N/A
A childish argument between Spider-Man and Nova gets their entire team grounded. To prove themselves to Fury, the super-youths go through S.H.I.E.L.D.'s database of the most wanted supervillains to see who they can defeat and apprehend to impress Nick Fury. When the choices Batroc the Leaper, Blizzard, Melter, MODOK, Toad, Whirlwind and Lady Porcupine prove unpopular, Spider-Man and his team go to Latveria to track down Doctor Doom. They successfully capture Doom, but he tricks them into taking one of his Doombots aboard the Helicarrier.
4	4	"Venom"	Alex Soto	Man of Action & James Felder	April 15, 2012	N/A
Using DNA from a sample of Spider-Man's blood, Doctor Octopus creates an artificial, symbiotic life form named Venom. Driven by its desire to bond with Peter, the creature escapes from the laboratory, tracks him down to a house party and wreaks havoc, jumping from host to host and possessing each of Peter's teammates. At the end, Harry Osborn finds a sample of Venom and trains it.
5	5	"Flight of the Iron Spider"	Phil Pignotti	Man of Action	April 22, 2012	N/A
After a fight with the Living Laser, Spider-Man meets Iron Man, a superhero he idolizes. Impressed by Spider-Man's scientific knowledge, Iron Man builds him a high-tech armor suit called the Iron Spider, which is equipped with an array of powerful weaponry. Despite lacking the necessary skills and having no control over the suit's functions, Spider-Man becomes increasingly smug about his new equipment which puts a strain on his relationship with the team even when Living Laser returns.
6	6	"Why I Hate Gym"	Jeff Allen & Gary Hartle	Man of Action & Joe Fallon	April 29, 2012	N/A
Following Spider-Man and White Tiger's fight with Batroc the Leaper, Taskmaster is hired by Doctor Octopus. He goes undercover in Midtown High as a P.E teacher in an attempt to assassinate Spider-Man, whom he thinks attends the school. Spider-Man and White Tiger are forced to try putting their differences with each other aside in an effort to take him down.
7	7	"Exclusive"	Alex Soto	Man of Action & Dani Wolff	May 6, 2012	N/A
In this found footage episode, Mary Jane convinces Spider-Man to help her with an exclusive interview for the Daily Bugle; this is cut short when the Hulk is seemingly terrorizing the rest of New York City, forcing Spider-Man to try and stop him. Unbeknownst to Spider-Man, Hulk is fighting Zzzax.
8	8	"Back in Black"	Phil Pignotti	Man of Action	May 13, 2012	N/A
A mysterious new superhero dressed in black and with similar abilities to Spider-Man appears and attracts positive public attention. Peter suspects the new hero to be Venom, but his teammates dismiss his suspicions as jealousy. Peter then discovers that his friend Harry Osborn bonded with the Venom symbiote, and he tries to persuade Harry to get rid of it before it corrupts his mind and turns him evil.
9	9	"Field Trip"	Alex Soto	Man of Action & Eugene Son	May 20, 2012	N/A
During a school field trip to a museum, Danny translates the engraving on an ancient Norse rune stone and accidentally summons a Frost Giant. The Norse thunder god Thor arrives to aid Spider-Man's team, but magic from a medallion around the Giant's neck turns Thor into a frog. The team follow Thor to Asgard, where Loki is working with the Frost Giants to seize the Asgardian throne while Odin is in his Odinsleep.
10	10	"Freaky"	Jeff Allen	Brian Michael Bendis	June 17, 2012	N/A
The mind-controlling villain Mesmero switches the consciousnesses of both Spider-Man and Wolverine in an attempt to take over New York. Both heroes must adjust to their different powers and mindsets to defeat Sabretooth and to get Mesmero to switch their minds back.
11	11	"Venomous (“Venom Attack” on Disney+)"	Phil Pignotti	Man of Action	June 24, 2012	N/A
Venom resurfaces, using Harry as his host again. This time, Venom is targeting Harry's neglectful father Norman Osborn. While Norman does not want his potential secret weapon damaged, Spider-Man is confronted with the dilemma of choosing between helping Harry on his own or putting his trust in his teammates, who have orders from Fury to finish Venom off.
12	12	"Me Time"	Alex Soto	Man of Action & Jacob Semahn	July 1, 2012	N/A
After a fight with Whirlwind, Spider-Man insists on a weekend off from Nick Fury and S.H.I.E.L.D. However, Doctor Octopus chooses this very time to attack Spider-Man when his job is threatened by Norman Osborn.
13	13	"Strange"	Jeff Allen	Man of Action & James Felder	July 8, 2012	N/A
The population of New York is plunged into a mysterious sleep, but Iron Fist manages to keep both himself and Spider-Man awake with chi energy. They seek the help of sorcerer Doctor Strange, and he explains the spell is the work of the demon Nightmare. To break the spell, the heroes have to enter the Dream Dimension and defeat Nightmare, facing manifestations of their fears and insecurities.
14	14	"Awesome"	Phil Pignotti	Man of Action & Eugene Son	July 15, 2012	N/A
Peter Parker struggles to split his attention between completing his science fair project with Luke Cage and combating Juggernaut. In his desperation concerning the former, he decides to "borrow" one of Curt Connors's inventions called Awesome Android, which becomes a bigger threat to the city.
15	15	"For Your Eye Only"	Jeff Allen	Brian Michael Bendis	July 22, 2012	1.48
The Helicarrier is commandeered by Zodiac, an elite criminal organization led by Scorpio who imprisons Nick Fury, hacks into S.H.I.E.L.D.'s database, and set the ship to self-destruct. Spider-Man is left as the only person who can save Fury and stop Zodiac before they obtain valuable data and the ship self-destructs over New York City.
16	16	"Beetle Mania"	Alex Soto	Man of Action & Scott Mosier	July 29, 2012	N/A
J. Jonah Jameson is targeted by the Beetle, a villain equipped with an array of high-tech weaponry. Much to Peter's annoyance, Fury tasks the team with guarding the Daily Bugle building. When Mary Jane tells Peter she is meeting Jameson for a job interview, he tries to stop her entering the building in case the Beetle attacks.
17	17	"Snow Day"	Phil Pignotti	Man of Action & Rich Fogel	August 5, 2012	N/A
When Midtown High School has a snow day, Phil Coulson orders Spider-Man and his team to report to a S.H.I.E.L.D. Arctic base called I.C.E. for winter survival training. They instead go against their orders and sneak off to a deserted tropical island for a vacation. While the island seems like a beautiful paradise, the team soon learns that it serves as a prison for Sandman.
18	18	"Damage"	Jeff Allen	Man of Action & Scott Mosier	August 19, 2012	N/A
Spider-Man's team fight the Wrecking Crew, but they end up unintentionally causing massive amounts of property damage. Fury assigns them to clean up their mess by working alongside Damage Control, a clean-up company that specializes in clearing collateral damage caused by superheroes. J. Jonah Jameson even has their work broadcast. Spider-Man is frustrated by this seemingly boring assignment, but he begins to suspect criminal activity within Damage Control when he notices their CEO Mac Porter acting suspiciously. Note: This episode was dedicated to Dwayne McDuffie, the creator of Damage Control, who died in 2011.
19	19	"Home Sick Hulk"	Alex Soto	Danielle Wolff & Man of Action	September 9, 2012	N/A
After Hulk falls sick with an alien infection caused by the Phalanx, Spider-Man, who fears that S.H.I.E.L.D. will lock the Hulk away rather than help him, tries to hide him at his house from the Phalanx, Nick Fury, and Aunt May.
20	20	"Run Pig Run"	Phil Pignotti	Man of Action & Eugene Son	September 16, 2012	N/A
Loki gets revenge on Spider-Man by turning him into a pig using an enchanted hot dog. With the help of Thor and the entire S.H.I.E.L.D. force, "Peter Porker" must survive an Asgardian boar hunt led by Executioner across New York City as Thor, Spider-Man's team, and Phil Coulson work to keep Spider-Man alive until sunset, when the hunt ends.
21	21	"I Am Spider-Man"	Jeff Allen	Man of Action & Joe Fallon	September 23, 2012	N/A
Peter Parker is shocked to discover that Midtown High is putting on a Spider-Man musical starring Flash Thompson as Spider-Man, disgusting Peter due to his year of torment at the bully's hands. The matter becomes dangerous when Trapster mistakes Flash for the real Spider-Man.
22	22	"The Iron Octopus"	Alex Soto	Man of Action & Frank Tieri	September 30, 2012	N/A
Doctor Octopus hacks into Iron Man's armors and sends one to kill Norman Osborn. While Norman blames Iron Man for the attack and threatens legal action, Spider-Man recovers a tentacle from an Octo-Bot and learns more about Doctor Octopus' history with both Oscorp, Doctor Connors and Norman himself. Doctor Octopus then attacks the Helicarrier in an arc reactor-powered suit of armor, created from a replica of Tony Stark's own arc reactor, and abducts Norman and Harry, so Spider-Man dons the Iron Spider suit to save them.
23	23	"Not a Toy"	Phil Pignotti	Brian Michael Bendis	October 7, 2012	N/A
Spider-Man's team is having a friendly training session with Captain America on board the Helicarrier. While handling Captain America's shield, Spider-Man accidentally throws it out of the window, and it lands in Latveria's New York embassy where it is found by Doctor Doom. Spider-Man and Captain America try to sneak into the Latverian embassy and retrieve the shield before Doctor Doom can exploit it for his purposes.
24	24	"The Attack of the Beetle"	Jeff Allen	Man of Action & Scott Mosier	October 14, 2012	N/A
To Peter's horror, Aunt May and Phil Coulson have become close and decide to go on a dinner date. Peter's plans to crash the party are dashed by an appearance by the Beetle, who has an old grudge with Coulson. Things get even more complicated when he kidnaps May, leading to a confrontation aboard the aircraft carrier USS Excelsior.
25	25	"Revealed"	Alex Soto	Man of Action & Eugene Son	October 28, 2012	N/A
Doctor Octopus captures Spider-Man and takes more blood samples for his experiments. Norman Osborn reveals himself to be the true mastermind behind Doctor Octopus' schemes, and he plans to create an unstoppable army from Spider-Man's DNA. Doctor Octopus is angry at Norman for treating him unfairly, so he takes revenge by injecting him with a mixture of DNA from Spider-Man and Venom, mutating him into the Green Goblin.
26	26	"The Rise of the Goblin"	Phil Pignotti	Man of Action & Jacob Semahn	October 28, 2012	N/A
The Green Goblin attacks Midtown High, so Spider-Man and S.H.I.E.L.D. escort Harry onto the Helicarrier for his own protection. The Green Goblin tracks the Helicarrier down, launches an assault and sends it crashing into the sea. As the ship sinks, Spider-Man tries to save Harry and convince him that his father has become evil, but the Green Goblin manipulates Harry into calling out the Venom symbiote and teaming up with him to destroy Spider-Man. Later, Spider-Man manages to free Harry from the symbiote, and rescue him, Nick Fury, and several other agents of S.H.I.E.L.D; however, Harry refuses to forgive Spider-Man and vows revenge on him before storming off. The Helicarrier is destroyed, leaving Nova, White Tiger, Iron Fist, and Power Man homeless, but Spider-Man allows them to live in his house.

=== Season 2 (2013) ===
No. overall	No. in season	Title	Directed by	Written by	Original release date	US viewers (millions)
27	1	"The Lizard"	Roy Burdine & Phil Pignotti	Man of Action, Jacob Semahn & Eugene Son	January 21, 2013	N/A
The heroes now live with Peter Parker and his Aunt May, but they struggle with space management. But they are sent by S.H.I.E.L.D. investigate Doctor Octopus' newest hideout, and confiscate a case containing several vials of formula made from DNA of different animals. S.H.I.E.L.D. scientist Curt Connors (whose left arm had to be amputated after the Helicarrier crashed) injects himself with formula containing lizard DNA. While it successfully restores his arm, it eventually turns him into a lizard-like mutant.
28	2	"Electro"	Roy Burdine & Phil Pignotti	Man of Action, Jacob Semahn & Eugene Son	January 21, 2013	N/A
Electro, a villain with the power to manipulate electricity, takes control of every electrical device in New York and causes a mass blackout, becoming ultimate Electro. Left unable to contact S.H.I.E.L.D., Spider-Man and his team have to learn to cooperate with each other and defeat Electro without the aid of technology.
29	3	"The Rhino"	Tim Maltby	Man of Action & Ed Valentine	January 21, 2013	N/A
Spider-Man and Power Man come into conflict with the Rhino, a strong rhinoceros-themed villain who tries to steal from Oscorp's chemical shipments. At school, Peter and Luke notice Flash Thompson is bullying a shy, nerdy classmate named Alex O'Hirn. They soon discover that Alex is the Rhino and seeks revenge on Flash.
30	4	"Kraven the Hunter"	Roy Burdine	Man of Action & Danielle Wolff	February 3, 2013	N/A
Ava is being haunted by memories of her past and struggles to maintain control over her White Tiger amulet, becoming more aggressive and feral during training sessions. Spider-Man tries to find a way to help her, but the whole team is put in danger when Kraven the Hunter, the obsessive great white hunter who killed Ava's father Hector Ayala, appears in New York to claim the amulet's power for himself. However, Spider-Man and White Tiger manages to defeat Kraven and foil his plans.
31	5	"Hawkeye"	Phil Pignotti	Man of Action & Scott Mosier	February 10, 2013	N/A
Beetle attacks the construction site of S.H.I.E.L.D.'s new Helicarrier. Nick Fury orders Spider-Man and Hawkeye (a member of the Avengers) to apprehend him. In their pursuit, an explosion damages one of Spider-Man's web shooters causing highly adhesive web fluid to leak onto Hawkeye's arm and leaving them stuck together. Spider-Man and Hawkeye must learn to put aside their differences and work together to defeat the Beetle.
32	6	"The Sinister Six"	Tim Maltby	Man of Action & Scott Mosier	February 17, 2013	N/A
Doctor Octopus assembles Electro, Kraven the Hunter, Rhino, and Beetle where he lures Spider-Man to his underwater laboratory underneath the Hudson River by using Dr. Connors as bait. Things get worse for Spider-Man when Doctor Octopus forcefully transforms Dr. Connors into Lizard to complete his Sinister Six. Spider-Man tries to evade the six villains and escape from the base so he can call his team for back-up.
33	7	"Spidah-Man!"	Roy Burdine	Story by: Joe Quesada; Teleplay by: Man of Action & Jimmy Palmiotti	March 17, 2013	N/A
Spider-Man has been busy while Aunt May was visiting a relative and Phil Coulson is taking the rest of his team to a water park. Just when Spider-Man's life in Manhattan has reached a new all-time low after J. Jonah Jameson puts out a bounty of 10 million Dollars for his unmasking, he is invited by the Mayor of Boston to become the town's residential superhero and tourism mascot. Not long after that, Spider-Man has to contend with the Steel Spider and a group of armored supervillains called the Boston Terroriers.
34	8	"Carnage"	Phil Pignotti	Man of Action & Paul Giacoppo	March 31, 2013	N/A
Peter contemplates telling Harry about his dual-life as Spider-Man and warning him that the Green Goblin could be targeting him. The Green Goblin abducts Peter and forces him to bond with an improved version of the Venom symbiote which he refers to as "Carnage". When Carnage attacks Harry's apartment, Harry takes control of the symbiote, becomes Venom again, and sets out to bring down the Green Goblin once and for all.
35	9	"House Arrest"	Tim Maltby	Man of Action & Eugene Son	April 7, 2013	N/A
Following their fight with Grizzly, Spider-Man's team prepares to house a surprise party at Peter and Aunt May's home. However, an attempt by Nova to shut down the secret S.H.I.E.L.D. security installations for some privacy makes the system go crazy while Spider-Man must also come to terms with his teammates' status as fellow houseboarders.
36	10	"The Man-Wolf"	Roy Burdine	Man of Action & Danielle Wolff	April 14, 2013	N/A
S.H.I.E.L.D. launch its new ship, the Tri-Carrier, which is capable of being divided into three separate ships for different situations. In its first mission, the Astro-Carrier segment travels to the moon to find J. Jonah Jameson's son John. The team soon learns that John was exposed to a lunar crystal and transformed into a werewolf known as the Man-Wolf. Spider-Man destroys the crystal, reverting John to normal, but he remains wolf-like and is taken to S.H.I.E.L.D. for treatment.
37	11	"Swarm"	Phil Pignotti and Tim Maltby	Man of Action, Scott Mosier, Kevin Burke & Chris "Doc" Wyatt	June 11, 2013	N/A
Spider-Man invents the Spider-Tracer, a high-tech tracking device he plans to plant on fleeing villains. He upgrades the Tracer with technology from Stark Industries without Tony Stark's permission, accidentally giving it the ability to produce multiple copies of itself. Disgruntled Stark Industries scientist Michael Tan uses a machine of his invention to separate his own atoms and his consciousness takes control of the Spider-Tracers, creating a living swarm driven by hatred towards Tony Stark.
38	12	"Itsy Bitsy Spider-Man"	Phil Pignotti and Tim Maltby	Man of Action, Scott Mosier, Kevin Burke & Chris "Doc" Wyatt	June 12, 2013	N/A
While looking for Thor missing in action, Spider-Man's team is shrunk into super-deformed versions of their own selves by one of Loki's tricks. Nick Fury has Spider-Man's team placed in the Helicarrier's D.A.Y.C.A.R.E. area. With Thor also having been shrunk, Spider-Man's team must find a way to help Thor fight Loki and the Destroyer Armor and return to normal size.
39	13	"Journey of the Iron Fist"	Roy Burdine	Man of Action & Jacob Semahn	June 13, 2013	N/A
After being attacked by a mysterious assassin, Danny is called back to K'un-L'un, an ancient Himalayan city in which he trained in martial arts, and Spider-Man accompanies him. He has to take part in a contest to determine the future king of K'un-Lun, but as poison from the assassin's blade temporarily blinds him, Spider-Man has to take his place in the contest and compete against a highly skilled yet arrogant warrior known as the Scorpion.
40	14	"The Incredible Spider-Hulk"	Phil Pignotti	Brian Michael Bendis	June 14, 2013	N/A
Mesmero escapes during a S.H.I.E.L.D. experiment to tame the Hulk's rage, exchanging Spider-Man's and Hulk's minds for another bout of vicious fun. This dilemma is severely aggravated when the Thing, who thinks the "Hulk" is on a rampage, also joins the fray.
41	15	"Stan By Me"	Tim Maltby	Man of Action & Joe Fallon	June 17, 2013	N/A
On a dark night, the Lizard attacks Midtown High School with Spider-Man, Mary Jane, Harry, and Stan the Janitor inside. Without the support of S.H.I.E.L.D., Spider-Man and Stan (who begins to demonstrate occult qualities) must unite to defeat the Lizard. When by accident he made the tracks of Connors disappear, turning the Lizard completely.
42	16	"Ultimate Deadpool"	Roy Burdine	Man of Action & Ed Valentine	June 18, 2013	N/A
Taskmaster steals a digital file containing the secret identities of every superhero who works with S.H.I.E.L.D., including those of Spider-Man and his teammates. Frustrated by a recent string of misfortune and his demanding S.H.I.E.L.D. training schedule, Spider-Man accompanies Deadpool (an absent-minded mercenary who once trained with S.H.I.E.L.D.) on his mission to retrieve the file. Spider-Man soon starts to realize Deadpool is not a true hero and is unwilling to adhere to morals.
43	17	"Venom Bomb"	Phil Pignotti	Man of Action & Scott Mosier	June 19, 2013	N/A
The Green Goblin is apprehended by Spider-Man's team and imprisoned on board the Tri-Carrier. He lets the Venom symbiote loose on the ship and it separates into multiple symbiotes which take control of the crew, creating an army of Venoms. When the Green Goblin escapes from his cell and bonds with the original symbiote, Spider-Man has to form an uneasy alliance with Doctor Octopus to devise a serum that will turn the Goblin back into Norman Osborn.
44	18	"Guardians of the Galaxy"	Tim Maltby	Brian Michael Bendis	June 20, 2013	N/A
Spider-Man and Nova assist the Guardians of the Galaxy in a mission to save the galaxy from Korvac and the Chitauri. Note: The episode is dedicated to Michael Clarke Duncan, who voiced Groot and died in 2012, prior to its release.
45	19	"The Parent Trap"	Roy Burdine	Man of Action & Kaita Mpambara	June 21, 2013	N/A
Spider-Man helps Power Man discover what really happened to his parents Walter and Amanda. They end up discovering that they were captured by Scorpio and the Zodiac so that they can mass-produce the super soldier serum that gave Power Man his powers for his own sinister use.
46	20	"Game Over"	Phil Pignotti	Man of Action & Jacob Semahn	June 24, 2013 (YTV); September 12, 2013 (Disney XD)	0.57
When Arcade plans to launch nuclear missiles to cause World War III, Spider-Man teams up with Captain America and Wolverine where they end up in Arcade's Madland located in Madripoor.
47	21	"Blade"	Roy Burdine & Phil Pignotti	Man of Action, Kevin Burke, & Chris "Doc" Wyatt	August 5, 2013 (YTV); October 3, 2013 (Note: This episode aired on Disney Channel.)	2.31
On Halloween night, Spider-Man's team are tasked with delivering a half of Tekamentep's Ankh (an ancient Egyptian artifact) to the vampire hunter Blade. They are attacked by an army of vampires sent by Dracula, who wants to use the Ankh's power to gain immunity to vampire weaknesses such as sunlight. Once the Ankh is safe, Fury sends the team and Blade to retrieve the second half from storage in a museum before Dracula can get to it.
48	22	"The Howling Commandos"	Roy Burdine & Phil Pignotti	Man of Action, Kevin Burke, & Chris "Doc" Wyatt	August 6, 2013 (YTV); October 17, 2013	2.31
Dracula has obtained both halves of Tekamentep's Ankh and has most of Spider-Man's team under mind control. To stop him activating the Ankh before sunrise, Spider-Man and Blade join forces with Nick Fury's Howling Commandos (a S.H.I.E.L.D. task force consisting of various heroic monsters like Frankenstein's Monster, Werewolf by Night, N'Kantu, the Living Mummy and Man-Thing) and travel to Dracula's castle in Transylvania to retrieve the Ankh.
49	23	"Second Chance Hero"	Tim Maltby	Man of Action, Kevin Burke, & Chris "Doc" Wyatt	June 28, 2013 (YTV); November 14, 2013	0.50
Norman Osborn (now known as the Iron Patriot) and Spider-Man join forces to take down the Frightful Four and Doctor Octopus' Spider-Soldiers, while also trying to reason with Harry Osborn, who still has a grudge against Spider-Man.
50	24	"Sandman Returns"	Roy Burdine	Man of Action & Danielle Wolff	June 27, 2013 (YTV); November 7, 2013	0.53
Sandman returns to New York City claiming that he has turned over a new leaf and wants to become a hero. While everyone else dismisses this new revelation, Spider-Man sees this as an opportunity to reform his former enemy into doing good, even though his newfound friend still fights his antagonistic ways.
51	25	"Return of the Sinister Six"	Phil Pignotti	Man of Action & Scott Mosier	June 25, 2013 (YTV); November 3, 2013	0.35
Doctor Octopus and Lizard break into Ryker's Island (a prison for supervillains) and free Rhino, Electro, Kraven the Hunter, and Scorpion while equipping each of them with battle armor made from stolen Oscorp technology. Spider-Man's team and the Iron Patriot fight the Sinister Six. While Spider-Man is determined to inject the Lizard with a formula that will make him human again, Doctor Octopus plans to turn Norman back into the Green Goblin.
52	26	"Ultimate"	Tim Maltby	Man of Action & Jacob Semahn	June 26, 2013 (YTV); November 10, 2013	0.64
Following the fight with the Sinister Six, Norman Osborn has been transformed into Green Goblin again and has captured Spider-Man's team (who have been previously defeated by the Sinister Six). Green Goblin has transformed his friends into Goblin versions of themselves and plans to use the old Helicarrier to gas New York City. But using Curt Connors' serum, Spider-Man transforms his team back and defeats Green Goblin. Because of his performance, he is offered a place in the Avengers.

=== Season 3: Web-Warriors (2014–15) ===
The third season, subtitled Web-Warriors, introduced a variation of the Spider-Verse arc.

No. overall	No. in season	Title	Directed by	Written by	Original release date	US viewers (millions)
53 54	1 2	"The Avenging Spider-Man"	Roy Burdine Tim Maltby	Paul Dini	June 13, 2014 (YTV); June 19, 2014	N/A
Part 1: Loki joins forces with Doctor Octopus to destroy the Avengers (consisting of Captain America, Thor, Hulk, Iron Man, Hawkeye, Black Widow, Falcon and Spider-Man). Loki does this by swapping bodies with Spider-Man to frame him and infusing Asgardian monsters with Venom. Part 2: After a case of mistaken identity, Spider-Man must convince his old team of S.H.I.E.L.D. that he is the real Spider-Man before being destroyed by his new team, the Avengers, who think he is Loki. But when everything is resolved and then at the end of the battle, Spider-Man must decide which team he belongs in.
55	3	"Agent Venom"	Kalvin Lee	Eugene Son	June 19, 2014	N/a
Following Spider-Man's fight with a Venom-possessed Scorpion, Flash Thompson comes into contact and bonds with the Venom symbiote after masquerading as the "Scarlet Spider". Meanwhile, Beetle returns and attempts to retrieve the symbiote from Flash's body, now is called Agent Venom, while Spider-Man battles Taskmaster who also wishes to do the same, in the end Flash decides to join Spider-Man in getting training from S.H.I.E.L.D to help him better control the venom symbiote.
56	4	"Cloak and Dagger"	Roy Burdine	Danielle Wolff	July 8, 2014	N/A
Spider-Man wishes to recruit Cloak and Dagger for his New Warriors initiative only to end up trying to stop Dormammu from defeating Doctor Strange by mind-controlling Cloak and his friends and invading the earth. After defeating Dormammu, Spider-Man tries to recruit Cloak and Dagger into his initiative, but they both decline due to their secret loyal alignment to Taskmaster.
57	5	"The Next Iron Spider"	Tim Maltby	Kevin Burke & Chris "Doc" Wyatt	August 7, 2013 (YTV); May 22, 2014	N/A
While Peter shows off the Iron Spider Armor to his classmates at the science fair of his school for charity, his intellectual 13-year-old rival Amadeus Cho is also eyeing the suit and, after a series of events, attains and perfectly operates the Iron Spider Armor making Spider-Man even more envious of Amadeus (considering he never could control the armor that well to begin with). Things get worse when Amadeus targets Spider-Man for being a "menace" as well as thinking that he is not a true hero while Taskmaster seeks to achieve the armor for his own villainous means. After defeating Taskmaster once again, Spider-Man lets Amadeus keep the armor after witnessing how adept he is with it (and for assisting him in the fight against Taskmaster as well as becoming more passive towards how he views him) and invites him to become a part of his New Warriors initiative, in which he agrees.
58	6	"The Vulture"	Kalvin Lee	Henry Gilroy & Marty Isenberg	June 19, 2014	N/A
Spider-Man attempts to recruit another person for his New Warriors initiative who goes by the name of "Vulture". Vulture was once a test subject of Doctor Octopus. Spidey goes after Harry Osborn for information about Vulture's past. After stopping him from murdering Harry and convincing him that his friend is innocent for what happened to him, Spidey tries to help Vulture by assisting him in regaining his memory by releasing Doctor Octopus from his cell for answers. But Doctor Octopus turns on them when they get to his former hideout for the truth about Vulture's past though Spider-Man and Vulture eventually take him down. Spider-Man appeals to Vulture about his New Warriors initiative, but he declines wanting to find his own purpose in life only to meet with Taskmaster with whom he strikes an alliance.
59	7	"The Savage Spider-Man"	Roy Burdine	Jim McCann	July 3, 2014	N/A
Spider-Man accompanies Wolverine to the Savage Land to recruit Ka-Zar and his pet Smilodon Zabu. During this time, they discover a plot by Taskmaster and Kraven the Hunter to abduct Zabu as part of Kraven the Hunter's ritual to gain immortality.
60	8	"New Warriors"	Tim Maltby	Eugene Son	July 15, 2014	N/A
Now that the other young heroes have been assembled, Spider-Man must lead them into defending the Tri-Carrier from the Thunderbolts (consisting of Taskmaster, Vulture, and Cloak and Dagger) when they free Green Goblin, Doctor Octopus, Beetle, and Scorpion from prison.
61 64	9 12	"The Spider-Verse"	Kalvin Lee Roy Burdine Tim Maltby Kalvin Lee	Danielle Wolff Paul Dini Kevin Burke & Chris "Doc" Wyatt Eugene Son	August 31, 2014 September 16, 2014 September 19, 2014 September 20, 2014	N/A
Part 1: Spider-Man learns that the Green Goblin is planning to travel across the Multiverse using the Siege Perilous to collect the DNA of other Spider-Men. Spider-Man follows his enemy to the futuristic world of Marvel 2099 and helps boost the confidence of Spider-Man 2099. Then he travels to a gender-swapped universe and teams up with its Spider-Girl to defeat their world's versions of the Green Goblin. Part 2: While chasing Green Goblin across the Multiverse, Spider-Man arrives in the Marvel Noir universe where he helps Spider-Man Noir renew his friendship with Mary Jane. Then Spider-Man heads to a cartoonish world inhabited by anthropomorphic animals where he helps Peter Porker find the will to be Spider-Ham again. Part 3: As Spider-Man continues chasing Green Goblin across the Multiverse, he lands in a medieval-based world where he helps Spyder-Knight take down the Alchemist (the medieval version of Doctor Octopus) and his Kraken creation to save York. Then, his last stop before heading back home is an alternate version of the Ultimate Universe where he helps Miles Morales overcome the guilt of being unable to save his world's Peter Parker from death and fight the Ultimate Green Goblin. Part 4: After Spider-Man finally ends up back in his own universe, he finds Green Goblin has injected himself with the Spider-Men DNA from all the universes to become the Spider-Goblin. With Electro's help from the Siege Perilous, he summons all the Spider-Men dubbed Web-Warriors to battle the Spider-Goblin and save New York.
65	13	"The Return of the Guardians of the Galaxy"	Roy Burdine	Brian Michael Bendis	September 24, 2014	N/A
The Guardians of the Galaxy land on Earth to repair their ship at the same time ex-Nova Corps member Titus leads the Chitauri in targeting Nova's helmet. Spider-Man and Nova must work with the Guardians of the Galaxy to defeat Titus and the Chitauri.
66	14	"S.H.I.E.L.D. Academy"	Tim Maltby	Marty Isenberg	August 8, 2015 (YTV); April 9, 2015	0.41
The S.H.I.E.L.D. Academy has been opened up at the Triskelion by Nick Fury as Spider-Man's group gets their education from Robert Frank and guest instructors like Captain America and Hawkeye. Halfway into their education, Spider-Man and Iron Spider unknowingly reactivate an old World War II villain named Arnim Zola.
67	15	"The Rampaging Rhino"	Kalvin Lee	Marty Isenberg	April 27, 2015	0.41
When Rhino learns that his archenemy Flash has become a hero, he starts a bitter rampage through New York. Spider-Man and Agent Venom are the last line of defense with help from Hulk. However, Hulk and Rhino face in battle and only Spider-Man and Agent Venom should stop now so to not cause destruction.
68	16	"Ant-Man"	Roy Burdine	Tom Pugsley	May 11, 2015	N/A
Nick Fury has been infected by nanite versions of Doctor Octopus' Octo-Bots. While the others face off against Doctor Octopus, Spider-Man and Power Man work with Ant-Man to enter Nick Fury's body and get the Octo-Bots out of him, with help to Iron Spider create a special submarine.
69	17	"Burrito Run"	Tim Maltby	Mairghread Scott	May 18, 2015	0.43
Craving Mexican food following an entire day training with Hawkeye, Spider-Man, Power Man, and Squirrel Girl sneak out of the Triskelion after hours to get burritos. Along the way, they must contend with Mesmero's plot to use the cellular network to brainwash everyone like he did with Batroc the Leaper, Boomerang, Grizzly, and Shocker.
70	18	"Inhumanity"	Kalvin Lee	Geoffrey Thorne	April 25, 2015	0.37
Following Spider-Man's fight with Molten Man, the Inhumans declare war on Manhattan as Nick Fury blames the exchange student Triton. Spider-Man and Triton discover that Maximus has brainwashed the rest of the Inhuman Royal Family (consisting of Black Bolt, Medusa, Gorgon, Lockjaw and Karnak) and plans to crash Attilan into Manhattan.
71	19	"Attack of the Synthezoids"	Roy Burdine	Andrew R. Robinson	August 11, 2015 (TV Tokyo); September 19, 2015	0.31
Arnim Zola resurfaces and starts replacing Spider-Man's fellow students with synthezoid versions of themselves.
72	20	"The Revenge of Arnim Zola"	Tim Maltby	Brandon Auman	August 18, 2015 (TV Tokyo); September 26, 2015	0.36
With most of his fellow students replaced with synthezoids, Spider-Man must work with Agent Venom and Rhino to rescue their classmates and defeat Arnim Zola.
73	21	"Halloween Night at the Museum"	Kalvin Lee	Danielle Wolff	October 10, 2014	2.28
In an animated crossover with Jessie, Jessie Prescott, Emma Ross, Luke Ross, Ravi Ross, Zuri Ross, and their lizard Mrs. Kipling visit a museum on Halloween. Jessie finds a medieval sword coveted by Morgan le Fay while unknowingly freeing her from her imprisonment. Jessie and Spider-Man work to save Halloween and the world from the evil plans of le Fay's. Special guest stars: Debby Ryan as Jessie Prescott, Peyton List as Emma Ross, Cameron Boyce as Luke Ross, Karan Brar as Ravi Ross, Skai Jackson as Zuri Ross
74	22	"Nightmare on Christmas"	Roy Burdine	Eugene Son	December 3, 2014	N/A
After a fight with Shocker and falling from a building unconscious, Spider-Man sees what the world would be like without him when Nightmare takes him on a journey through his past where he re-enacts his fight with the Enforcers, his present where he fights Shocker again, and a future where Peter Parker gave up being Spider-Man enough for Green Goblin's Goblin King form to hunt every superhero. After experiencing each one, Spider-Man must fight Nightmare to get out of this nightmare and learn the meaning of being a hero who needs it most.
75 78	23 26	"Contest of Champions"	Tim Maltby Kalvin Lee Roy Burdine Tim Maltby	Thomas F. Zahler Matt Wayne Marty Isenberg Eugene Son	September 8, 2015 (TV Tokyo); October 3, 2015 September 15, 2015 (TV Tokyo); October 10, 2015 September 22, 2015 (TV Tokyo); October 17, 2015 September 29, 2015 (TV Tokyo); October 24, 2015	N/A
Part 1: Upon finding the people of New York disappearing and a force field around the city, Spider-Man is attacked by Abomination, Beetle, and Executioner until he is saved by a familiar drone. Spider-Man discovers that he has been chosen to be the chief game piece of the Collector against Grandmaster who seeks to submit the Earth and once again humiliate his brother. With the human race at stake, Spider-Man agrees to fight for Collector. The first game in Central Park involves Spider-Man working with Iron Man and Hulk against Kraven the Hunter, Molten Man, and Wendigo King in a game of "Last Man Standing." Part 2: In the second game, Spider-Man is partnered with Captain America, Red Hulk, and Iron Fist in a game of capture the flag against Sandman, Blastaar, and Ymir. For the third game, Spider-Man is partnered with Power Man, Black Widow, and Skaar against Doctor Octopus, Absorbing Man, and Zzzax in a game of last team standing. Part 3: For the fourth game, Spider-Man teams up with Iron Spider, Agent Venom, and Thor against Terrax, Attuma, and Annihilus in a fight within the subway. Sneaking away from the battle, Spider-Man obtains some Life Model Decoys and uses them to distract Grandmaster so he, Iron Spider, and Agent Venom can board Grandmaster's ship to save the civilian hostages. While Collector summons A-Bomb, Hawkeye, and She-Hulk to the battle, Spider-Man, Iron Spider, and Agent Venom gain the unlikely assistance of an imprisoned Leader and MODOK to give them powers to be invincible and Aunt May is revealed to be aware of Peter's secret identity as Spider-Man. Agent Venom and Iron Spider are also made aware of this fact. Part 4: Grandmaster has won the Contest of Champions and claims Manhattan for the bad guys. As Spider-Man frees each superhero while Collector stands his ground against Doctor Octopus, Skurge, and Absorbing Man, he challenges Grandmaster to a winner take all battle.

=== Season 4: vs. the Sinister 6 (2016–17) ===
On June 1, 2015, it was announced that the series has been renewed for a fourth season, retitled Ultimate Spider-Man vs the Sinister 6. The season premiered with a one-hour episode titled "Hydra Attacks" on February 21, 2016.

No. overall	No. in season	Title	Directed by	Written by	Original release date	US viewers (millions)
79 80	1 2	"Hydra Attacks"	Young Ki Yoon Jae Woo Kim	Kevin Burke & Chris "Doc" Wyatt	February 21, 2016	0.36 0.41
Part 1: After Spider-Man, Iron Spider, and Agent Venom defeat Doctor Octopus, they take him to be imprisoned at the Tri-Carrier. Doctor Octopus uses one of his miniature Octo-Bots to hack into Swarm's nanites, rebuilding the Tri-Carrier as Hydra Island. This was all part of Doctor Octopus' partnership with the recently-freed Arnim Zola, which includes creating Goblin Formula-enhanced Hydra agents. Doctor Octopus also receives an upgrade to his armor, gaining a more sinister appearance. Spider-Man is saved by an unknown spider from falling into the sea. Part 2: Upon being saved by the mysterious Scarlet Spider, Spider-Man rallies Iron Spider and Agent Venom to fight Hydra, now allied with Doctor Octopus and Kraven the Hunter. Doctor Octopus attempts to turn Norman Osborn back into the Green Goblin, but fails as Norman had immunized himself with a formula to counteract further transformations. Given the antidote, the Spider-Men start reverting the Hydra goblins back to normal. As they cannot remove Zola's consciousness from Hydra Island, Iron Spider programs the engines to take the vessel into space, where Zola will not bother them again. Meanwhile, Doctor Octopus escapes with Kraven to continue rebuilding the Sinister Six.
81	3	"Miles From Home"	Roy Burdine	Kevin Burke & Chris "Doc" Wyatt	February 27, 2016	0.47
On orders from Hydra, Doctor Octopus teams up with Baron Mordo to use the Siege Perilous to bring the Ultimate Green Goblin from Miles Morales' world to join the Sinister Six. However, the Goblin steals the Siege Perilous and begins destroying reality. Miles is brought by Doctor Strange to help fight Green Goblin, which results in the destruction of the Siege Perilous; as a result, both Goblin and Miles are trapped in this dimension. Doctor Octopus manages to convince Green Goblin to ally with him and the Sinister Six, while Miles is welcomed to the Web-Warriors by Peter.
82	4	"Iron Vulture"	Young Ki Yoon	Jacob Semahn	March 5, 2016	0.53
Adjusting to Spider-Man's world, Miles Morales works on developing a new codename since Peter Parker is still using the Spider-Man name. The two of them stumble upon a plot by Doctor Octopus and an armored-up Vulture to raid Oscorp in order to access the computers so that Vulture can learn more about his past. Spider-Man and Miles help Norman Osborn in the Iron Patriot armor fight Doctor Octopus and Vulture. To help out his dad, Harry dons one of his armors and becomes "Patrioteer."
83	5	"Lizards"	Jae Woo Kim	Paul Giacoppo	March 12, 2016	0.57
Curt Connors has been turned into Lizard again. This time, he has a bite that turns anyone who is bitten into Lizards. The Triskelion goes under lockdown when Spider-Man's team and the S.H.I.E.L.D. Academy personnel get infected and attack Spider-Man. With help from an item in Nick Fury's office and with the help of Iron Spider, Leo Fitz, and Jemma Simmons, Spider-Man must work on an antidote to restore everyone to normal. Meanwhile, Agent Venom and Rhino guard Doctor Octopus' cell during the outbreak just in case he plans any escapes from his cell. Once everyone is cured, Spider-Man witnesses Doctor Octopus and Rhino making off with Agent Venom. Note: Iain De Caestecker and Elizabeth Henstridge reprise their respective roles as Leo Fitz and Jemma Simmons from Agents of S.H.I.E.L.D..
84	6	"Double Agent Venom"	Roy Burdine	Mairghread Scott	March 19, 2016	0.52
After Doctor Octopus and Rhino escape the Triskelion with Agent Venom in their clutches, Spider-Man and Scarlet Spider track them to Hydra Island as Doctor Octopus and Arnim Zola work to separate the Venom symbiote from Flash Thompson. To get to Flash, Spider-Man and Scarlet Spider have to fight their way past Kraven the Hunter and the Hydra agents. Doctor Octopus separates the symbiote from Flash, giving it to Kraven, who becomes a lion-like Venom. However, Flash is able to coerce the symbiote back to him as they understand each other.
85	7	"Beached"	Young Ki Yoon	Geoffrey Thorne	March 26, 2016	0.45
Spider-Man, Iron Spider, Agent Venom, Kid Arachnid, and Scarlet Spider have been looking for signs on where Doctor Octopus is hiding out. Upon Spider-Man and Iron Spider being ambushed by Vulture, they follow him to a nearby island where they are attacked by clones of Sandman. As Spider-Man fights the Sandman clones, Iron Spider stumbles upon a secret laboratory where Doctor Octopus has captured Sandman and cloned him so that he can find the "Ultimate Sandman" that will join the Sinister Six. After Sandman is rescued and Doctor Octopus escapes, Spider-Man allows Sandman to spread out around the Triskelion.
86	8	"Anti-Venom"	Jae Woo Kim	Matt Wayne	April 2, 2016	0.48
Spider-Man and Agent Venom have been busting villains like Beetle, Grizzly, Shocker, and Shriek and suspect them to be candidates for Doctor Octopus' Sinister Six. Arnim Zola recruits Michael Morbius to work on a new symbiote. When Spider-Man, Agent Venom, and Harry Osborn in the Patrioteer armor track them down, they are caught off-guard when they release the Anti-Venom symbiote, which possesses Harry and lacks traditional symbiote weaknesses. The resulting battle leaves Agent Venom injured and Harry in a coma.
87	9	"Force of Nature"	Roy Burdine	Gavin Hignight	April 9, 2016	0.59
During a drought, Spider-Man, Iron Spider, Kid Arachnid, and Scarlet Spider answer a distress signal that takes them to an abandoned mall in Queens. They find an empty air-tight room containing Hydro-Man who has a past with Nick Fury. While transporting him to the Triskelion, Iron Spider find that Hydro-Man is not a good guy where the fight with him causes an emergency landing near Aunt May's house. While Spider-Man, Iron Spider, and Kid Arachnid fight Hydro-Man, Scarlet Spider works to protect Aunt May who ends up naming him Ben. Once Hydro-Man is defeated where the resulting battle watered Aunt May's lawn, Spider-Man gets word that the Quinjet carrying Hydro-Man back to his cell was intercepted, causing Spider-Man to speculate that Doctor Octopus has gotten Hydro-Man on his side.
88 89	10 11	"The New Sinister Six"	Young Ki Yoon Jae Woo Kim	Jacob Semahn Kevin Burke & Chris "Doc" Wyatt	June 7, 2016 (TV Tokyo); June 10, 2016 June 14, 2016 (TV Tokyo); June 17, 2016	0.54 0.53
Part 1: After defeating Shriek, Spider-Man joins Flash Thompson, Amadeus Cho, Miles Morales, and Ben Reilly for Aunt May's birthday party. Things get worse when Doctor Octopus completes his Sinister Six upon assembling Kraven the Hunter, Rhino, Hydro-Man, Electro, and Ultimate Green Goblin where they attack the Triskelion. Even when most of the Sinister Six is defeated by the S.H.I.E.L.D. Academy students, Spider-Man is caught off guard when it turns out Rhino was not the mole and that there is a seventh member of Doctor Octopus' group that Spider-Man least suspects: Scarlet Spider. Part 2: Now that Doctor Octopus knows that Spider-Man is Peter Parker, he sends Scarlet Spider to claim a key that Spider-Man hid at Aunt May's house. As Doctor Octopus turns Hydra Island into Octopus Island with his nano-technology while entraping Arnim Zola, Spider-Man races to get to Scarlet Spider before he can harm Aunt May. To deal with Hydro-Man, Spider-Man has awaken Sandman to fight him. When Scarlet Spider is persuaded by Aunt May to help Spider-Man, he seemingly sacrifices himself to crash Octopus Island into the ocean.
90	12	"Agent Web"	Roy Burdine	Geoffrey Thorne	June 21, 2016 (TV Tokyo); June 24, 2016	0.53
As the S.H.I.E.L.D. Academy students and Sandman are enjoying a game of volleyball, Spider-Man sees Nova crashing into the Triskelion. Before falling unconscious, Nova gives Spider-Man a box that is needed to help rescue Nick Fury. In the company of Triton, Spider-Man goes to the abandoned Inhuman city of Atarog. Upon encountering Madame Web, Spider-Man and Triton discover that Crossbones has imprisoned Fury. With help from Madame Web's skills, Spider-Man and Triton are able to rescue Nick Fury and escape from Crossbones. As Nick Fury and Nova leave with Madame Web to find a safe location for her, the Inhuman Royal Family (consisting of Black Bolt, Medusa, Lockjaw, Karnak and Crystal) arrives to give Spider-Man and Triton a "ride" back to the Triskelion.
91 93	13 15	"The Symbiote Saga"	Roy Burdine Young Ki Yoon Jae Woo Kim	Joshua Fine Jacob Semahn Kevin Burke & Chris "Doc" Wyatt	July 3, 2016 July 10, 2016 July 17, 2016	0.43
Part 1: Michael Morbius steals a sample of the Venom symbiote off of Agent Venom as Crossbones orders him and a restrained Doctor Octopus to experiment with it. As Spider-Man and Agent Venom work to reclaim the Venom sample, the experiment enables the revival of the Carnage symbiote. Doctor Octopus uses a serum with vampire bat DNA in it to transforms Morbius into a vampire as Doctor Octopus is infected by Carnage. Spider-Man neutralizes to return his original form, but Carnage now still stands without needing a host. After exploding, Carnage starts to infect all of Manhattan. Part 2: Spider-Man works with Captain America to fight a Carnage-possessed Hulk with help of Iron Fist, Agent Venom, Cloak and Dagger. Meanwhile, Mary Jane works to keep a comatose Harry Osborn safe, Harry's stasis container is breached as Anti-Venom is awakened. Even when Spider-Man and Captain America free Shriek and people from the Carnage symbiote, Anti-Venom then goes around destroying the Carnage symbiotes that have possessed the civilians and even sacrifices itself to destroy the larger Carnage symbiote that's on the building and Harry becomes aware of Spider-Man and Agent Venom's identities as Peter Parker and Flash Thompson, respectively. Part 3: Following the Anti-Venom symbiote's sacrifice, the Carnage symbiote has reformed into giant size and enveloped Midtown High. As Spider-Man, Agent Venom, and Harry Osborn in the Patrioteer armor fight their way past the Mini-Carnages after getting Stan out of the building, they find that Mary Jane Watson has been transformed into the Carnage Queen as Morbius and Crossbones plan to use the missiles confiscated by S.H.I.E.L.D. to send the Carnage Drones to every city in the world.
94 97	16 19	"Return to the Spider-Verse"	Roy Burdine Young Ki Yoon Jae Woo Kim Roy Burdine	Andrew Robinson Kevin Burke & Chris "Doc" Wyatt Henry Gilroy Kevin Burke & Chris "Doc" Wyatt	August 2, 2016 (TV Tokyo); August 27, 2016 August 9, 2016 (TV Tokyo); September 3, 2016 August 16, 2016 (TV Tokyo); September 10, 2016 August 23, 2016 (TV Tokyo); September 17, 2016	0.35
Part 1: Spider-Ham, Spyder-Knight, and Miles Morales' mother Rio suddenly appear at Peter Parker's house. After being brought to K'un-L'un by Iron Fist, Spider-Man and Kid Arachnid meet with Nick Fury, Doctor Strange, and Madame Web, who states that the shattering of the Siege Perilous scattered its fragments to many dimensions and if they are not collected in time, the various universes will collide and be destroyed. Using the shard of the Siege Perilous, Spider-Man and Kid Arachnid are sent on a trip to the different dimensions to collect the shards. Their first stop is a Victorian era-themed world that is infested with vampires. Spider-Man and Kid Arachnid must help the vampire-hunting superhero Blood Spider get the first shard from the Lizard King (a Victorian version of the Lizard) and his hunter Wolf. The Lizard King plans to use the Siege Perilous shard to block the sun so the vampires can rule the Earth. Although Spider-Man and Kid Arachnid are able to save the day and revert all the vampires back to normal, they find out that Wolf is a spider-based villain himself called Wolf Spider and is from a different parallel world. Wolf Spider is collecting the shards to rule the multiverse and he knows Spider-Man's identity of Peter Parker. Part 2: Now that Spider-Man and Kid Arachnid have to contend with Wolf Spider to get to the Siege Perilous fragments, they work to find them before Wolf Spider does. Their next stop is a cartoon-like pirate dimension where the spider-themed pirate Web Beard is persuaded by Spider-Man and Kid Arachnid into reuniting his animal crew (consisting of pirate versions of Howard the Duck, Rocket Raccoon, and Cosmo the Spacedog) so that they can face the Kraken on a pirate ship version of Groot. Then Spider-Man and Kid Arachnid arrive in a Wild West dimension where they meet the spider-themed cowboy Webslinger who lost his Uncle Ben when Doc Ock Holliday took over the town. Now they help Webslinger build up the courage to fight Holliday and his deputy Phantom Rider. Part 3: Returning to the Noir reality, Spider-Man and Kid Arachnid tangle with Mr. Fixit (a Noir version of the Hulk) and his minions Thunderbolt Ross and A-Bombardier, who are in a gang war with the Noir version of Hammerhead. When Spider-Man Noir shows up, he does not want Spider-Man and Kid Arachnid to break up the gang war because since they last saw him, he lost his Mary Jane in an accident caused by Hammerhead's gang for which he blames Mr. Fixit. Spider-Man finds the Siege Perilous fragment in the new machine gun that was provided by Hammerhead's minion Martin Li. Upon touching the Siege Perilous, Li becomes the Noir version of Mister Negative and overthrows Noir Hammerhead. After Negative fends off Wolf Spider, Spider-Man and Kid Arachnid must persuade Spider-Man Noir and Noir Mr. Fixit to work together to help defeat Negative. Note: "Return to the Spider-Verse" Pt. 3 was one of Jon Polito's final roles before his death. Part 4: Spider-Man and Kid Arachnid return to Kid Arachnid's reality where he meets a spider-powered version of Gwen Stacy, who has been covering for Kid Arachnid with the help of this world's Aunt May while evading the robots working for police captain George Stacy. When Wolf Spider gets involved by holding Rio Morales hostage, Spider-Man, Kid Arachnid, and Spider-Woman work to stop Wolf Spider. They discover that he is an evil Peter Parker working to drain the energies of every spider character. Following Wolf Spider's defeat, George Stacy learns his daughter's secret upon talking to Rio. In the aftermath of the Siege Perilous' reassembly, Kid Arachnid and Rio emigrate to Spider-Man's reality.
98	20	"Strange Little Halloween"	Young Ki Yoon	Henry Gilroy	June 28, 2016 (TV Tokyo); October 1, 2016	0.30
On Halloween night, Spider-Man tries to go trick-or-treating when a strange magic engulfs Manhattan and has the trick-or-treaters becoming what they are dressed as. Spider-Man visits Doctor Strange, who claims that the responsible spell is on a quantum level. Spider-Man and Doctor Strange end up needing the help of Ant-Man to go to the Quantum Realm to find the source of the spell. Once there, Spider-Man, Doctor Strange, and Ant-Man find a reassembly Baron Mordo who attacks them with a construct that assumes the form of Dormammu, Ultron, and Doctor Octopus' nanite-enhanced form, which is only the beginning of its plot.
99 101	21 23	"The Spider Slayers"	Young Ki Yoon Jae Woo Kim Roy Burdine	Paul Giacoppo Joshua Hale Fialkov Marty Isenberg	August 30, 2016 (TV Tokyo); October 8, 2016 September 6, 2016 (TV Tokyo); October 15, 2016 September 13, 2016 (TV Tokyo); October 22, 2016	0.34
Part 1: While out with Mary Jane Watson in Central Park, Peter Parker finds a Spider-Man clone that tries to feed off them. They trace the clone to one of Doctor Octopus' labs. There, they find info on "Project Kaine" which was a combination of Spider-Man's DNA and the Synthezoids. Mary Jane uses the Carnage symbiote inside her, becoming Spider-Woman. Upon Scarlet Spider resurfacing and helping to take down the deformed Kaine, Spider-Man and Spider-Woman find that he is wanting to know his history while planning to get revenge on Doctor Octopus and wanting to learn about his past. Part 2: Because Arnim Zola stole Doctor Octopus' research, Scarlet Spider and Spider-Man have Doctor Octopus take him to the sunken Hydra Island, where Scarlet Spider wants information on his past. Spider-Man, Doctor Octopus, and Scarlet Spider fight the Delta-Nine Synthezoids, a Spider-Slayer team of Spider-Man/Synthezoid hybrids consisting of Bone Spider, Goliath Spider, and Ghost Spider. Later, Arnim Zola reawakens. Meanwhile, Mary Jane rounds up Agent Venom, Iron Spider, and Kid Arachnid to meet up with Spider-Man to show her transformation as Spider-Woman. Scarlet Spider is revealed to be a Spider-Synthezoid with too much Spider-Man DNA. At the same time, Doctor Octopus uses another nanotechnology upgrade that not only changes to another appearance, but healed his body. Part 3: Following the fight against Arnim Zola; Spider-Man, Spider-Woman, Agent Venom, Iron Spider, and Kid Arachnid bring Scarlet Spider and the Delta-Nine Synthezoids back to the Triskelion where they have to get Nova, Power Man, Iron Fist, and Squirrel Girl to stand down due to what happened when they know Scarlet Spider worked for Doctor Octopus, revealed Spider-Man's identity, to endanger S.H.I.E.L.D. Academy and Aunt May, being all against him and be locked up for life. When a security breach places the Triskelion in lockdown and starts draining the energies of its inhabitants enough to leave them with coma-like symptoms, they find that a reassembled Kaine is responsible as he targets the spider-based characters. When Kaine gets control of the Delta-Nine Synthezoids, Spider-Man and the other spider-based heroes defeat Kaine after he combines with the Synthezoids.
102	24	"The Moon Knight Before Christmas"	Jae Woo Kim	Elliott Casey	July 5, 2016 (TV Tokyo); December 17, 2016	0.38
On a winter night, Spider-Man is guarding Doctor Strange's Sanctum Sanctorum when he hears Moon Knight chasing a girl from outside. For her safety, Spider-Man allows her to enter the Sanctorum only to discover that she is Francis Beck, the daughter of his presumed deceased enemy Mysterio. Blaming Spider-Man for his death, Francis uses Mysterio's enchanted helmet to attack Spider-Man. The helmet unleashes a mystical threat which Spider-Man is able to contain with the assistance of Moon Knight.
103 104	25 26	"Graduation Day"	Young Ki Yoon Jae Woo Kim	Kevin Burke & Chris "Doc" Wyatt	September 20, 2016 (TV Tokyo, Part 1); September 27, 2016 (TV Tokyo, Part 2); January 7, 2017	0.36 0.40
Part 1: As Peter Parker prepares to graduate from S.H.I.E.L.D. Academy, he is visited by Doctor Octopus who threatens to harm Aunt May if he puts on the Spider-Man costume again. Spider-Man refuses to agree and puts Aunt May in protective S.H.I.E.L.D. custody, to capture Doctor Octopus with the help of his team of Web-Warriors and New Warriors. After rounding up Kraven the Hunter, the Rhino, the Scorpion and the Vulture as well as turning Crossbones into a Lizard, Doctor Octopus allows himself to be incarcerated in the Triskelion's security brig by Spider-Man´s team. The graduation ceremony attended by the Avengers, Doctor Strange, Sandman, Nick Fury, Power Man's parents, Patrioteer, and Ant-Man. As he ends up breaking out while Spider-Man brings Aunt May to the graduation, Doctor Octopus and his new Sinister Six break free as he ensnares Aunt May. Spider-Man reluctantly injects himself with a serum to cure him of his powers in order to keep Aunt May safe. Doctor Octopus then takes control of the Triskelion where he places a contracting forcefield around the graduation ceremony. The contracting forcefield is starting to close in on the graduation attendees. Part 2: Desperate to stop the Superior Sinister Six and getting a pep talk from Aunt May, Spider-Man gets his original web shooters back from Aunt May and heads to Oscorp. With the help of Norman Osborn, Spider-Man is able to regain his powers with the radioactive spider in Doctor Octopus' hidden lab and confront the Superior Sinister Six when they arrive at Oscorp. As Doctor Octopus terrorizes the city, Spider-Man uses the same serum on Vulture, Crossbones, and Rhino to depower them while also defeating Kraven the Hunter and Scorpion. Doctor Octopus then uses an octopus formula that turns himself into a giant octopus-like creature. Spider-Man returns Doctor Octopus to normal using a special serum and works with him to get rid of the forcefield. Afterwards, Doctor Octopus is taken away by Iron Man. Following the graduation ceremony, Agent Venom and Scarlet Spider become S.H.I.E.L.D. Academy teachers, Alex O'Hirn, Adrian Toomes, and Frances Beck enroll as students along with Mary Jane and Harry Osborn, and after he stops Trapster, Nick Fury tells Spider-Man that he finally has become the Ultimate Spider-Man. Peter Parker reminisces on his more inexperienced days as Spider-Man and how far he has come as he celebrates Uncle Ben's birthday, and goes out to stop a robbery in East Village, Manhattan.
