= Your Eyes =

Your Eyes may refer to:

== Albums ==
- Your Eyes (album), by Kult, 1991

== Songs ==
- "Your Eyes" (Arashi song), 2012
- "Your Eyes" (Jai Waetford song), 2013
- "Your Eyes" (Kate Ryan song), 2008
- "Your Eyes" (Stray Kids song), 2022
- "Your Eyes", by Cook da Books from the La Boum 2 soundtrack, 1982
- "Your Eyes", by the Damned from Music for Pleasure, 1977
- "Your Eyes", by Diplo from Diplo, 2022
- "Your Eyes", by Hardline from II, 2002
- "Your Eyes", by Simply Red from Love and the Russian Winter, 1999
- "Your Eyes", by Tatsuro Yamashita from Big Wave, 1984
- "Your Eyes", by the Sundays from Static & Silence, 1997
- "Your Eyes", by Underground Lovers from Leaves Me Blind, 1992
- "Your Eyes", from the musical Rent, 1996
- "Your Eyes", written by Edwin Schneider

== See also ==
- For Your Eyes Only (disambiguation)
- In Your Eyes (disambiguation)
