= Love & Emotion =

Studio album by Stevie B
- Released: 1990
- Genre: Freestyle, dance
- Length: 42:54 (original); 50:53 (bonus track)
- Label: LMR/RCA
- Producer: Stevie B Warren Allen Brooks; Glenn Gutierrez

Stevie B chronology
In My Eyes (1988)	Love & Emotion (1990)	The Best of Stevie B (1991)

Singles from Love & Emotion
- 1. "Love & Emotion" Released: 1990; 2. "Because I Love You (The Postman Song)" Released: 1990; 3. "I'll Be by Your Side" Released: 1991; 4. "Forever More" Released: 1991

Alternative covers
- German Edition

Love & Emotion is the third album by the dance music artist Stevie B. It was released in 1990 on LMR/RCA Records. It produced the smash hit "Because I Love You (The Postman Song)", which became his only No. 1 hit on the pop charts.

== Critical reception ==
Professional ratings
Review scores
Source	Rating
AllMusic	3/5 stars
Chicago Tribune	2/4 stars
The Encyclopedia of Popular Music	2/5 stars
The Rolling Stone Album Guide	3.5/5 stars

The Rolling Stone Album Guide wrote that "the emphasis shifts from mood to melody, and that makes a world of difference."

== Track listing ==
No.	Title	Lyrics	Length
1.	"Love & Emotion"	Warren Allen Brooks	3:43
2.	"Because I Love You (The Postman Song)"	Warren Allen Brooks	5:02
3.	"Forever More"	Warren Allen Brooks	4:15
4.	"Broken Hearted"	Warren Allen Brooks	4:45
5.	"Facts of Love"	Stevie B/Dadgel Atabay	5:24
6.	"Who's Lovin' You Tonight?"	Warren Allen Brooks	4:56
7.	"We're Jammin' Now"	Stevie B	5:45
8.	"Memories of Loving You"	Stevie B	4:02
9.	"I'll Be By Your Side"	Stevie B	4:59

Japanese Edition

No.	Title	Lyrics	Length
10.	"Love & Emotion [Mean Mix]"	Warren Allen Brooks	7:53

== Certifications ==
Country	Certification	Date	Sales certified
U.S.	Gold	January 8, 1991	500,000

== Personnel ==
- Stevie B. – lead vocals, backing vocals, drums (7), percussion (7)
- Warren Allen Brooks – keyboards (1–4, 6), drums (1, 3, 4, 6), percussion (1, 3, 4, 6), cymbals
- Dadgel Atabay – keyboards (5, 7–9), drums (5, 7), percussion (5, 7)
- Glenn Gutierrez – programming, sampling, sound effects, cymbals, Roland SH-101 bass (7), drums (8, 9), percussion (8, 9)
- Claudette De Barros – French vocals (3)

Production

- Herb Moelis – executive producer
- Stevie B. – producer, mixing (1–3, 5–9)
- Warren Allen Brooks – co-producer (1–4, 6)
- Glenn Gutierrez – co-producer (5, 8, 9)
- Jimmy Starr – recording, mixing (4)
- Herb Powers Jr. – mastering at Hit Factory Mastering (New York City, New York)
- Gero Trouth – logo design
- LWW – cover design

== Charts ==
Chart (1990)	Peak position
Australian Albums (ARIA Charts)	87
US Billboard 200	54
US Top R&B Albums	81
Japan Oricon	16
Sweden Sverigetopplistan	50
