= Nightcat =

American comic book character and singer

- The cover to Nightcat #1, art by Joe Jusko.

Publication information
- Publisher: Marvel Comics
- First appearance: Nightcat #1 (April 1991)

In-story information
- Alter ego: Jacqueline Saharra Tavares
- Species: Human
- Place of origin: Earth
- Notable aliases: Jackie Tavares
Nightcat
Publication information
- Format: One-shot
- Genre: Superhero
- Publication date: April 1991
- No. of issues: 1
Creative team
- Written by: Jim Salicrup; Barry Dutter; Stan Lee
- Penciller: Denys Cowan
- Inker: Jimmy Palmiotti
- Letterer: Janice Chiang
- Colorist: Gregory Wright
- Editor: Bob Budiansky

Nightcat is a fictional multimedia character created by comic book company Marvel Comics in partnership with record label LeFrak-Moelis Records (LMR). The character was a fictionalised version of LMR artist Jacqueline "Jackie" Tavares, who functioned as the model for the comic character.

== Creation ==
Marvel Comics had previously explored the possibility of creating a cross-promotional comic character-pop singer hybrid before, working with Casablanca Records on Dazzler. However, the musical component of the character had never been realised, and Dazzler had remained a comic-only property. In 1991 LeFrak-Moelis was a subsidiary of RCA Records, and had achieved chart success with Stevie B and Jaya, and were approached by talent manager Don Kessler to sign his latest discovery, Jacqueline Tavares. Born in the Dominican Republic before moving to America at a young age, Tavares had studied acting growing up in Queens before modelling with an agency called Judith Models. The exposure there led to her being signed by agent Charles Stein of Black Cat Entertainment, and she had been attempting to break into acting when she met Kessler. Through a chance encounter with Marvel publisher Stan Lee, Kessler had developed the idea for the Nightcat project.

Jacqueline Tavares in costume as Nightcat in a portrait published in Nightcat #1.

The project was consolidated into a holding company called Night Cat Entertainment, with Lee on the advisory board and Tavares receiving a 10% share. With Stein putting up a reported $1m and LMR providing $500,000, organising the comic side of the operation fell to Bob Budiansky, Marvel's Head of Special Projects. In turn Budiansky assigned writing duties to Jim Salicrup, a veteran Marvel staffer who had experience with licensed titles such as The Transformers and The A-Team. Salicrup brought onboard protégé Barry Dutter to help write the project, and the pair devised most of the character and storyline over a business lunch with Budiansky; Dutter recalled the trio "decided to make it as much like Die Hard as possible.". At the time Lee was rarely working on comics, instead living on the West Coast to promote Marvel media projects; while he was officially credited as writing the script for the character's debut appearance and acted the role of writer/co-creator in media appearances, Dutter recalled his actual involvement in the comic as being minimal.

In line with Marvel's attempts to add recognisable names to the project Jim Lee was tasked with designing the character - something mentioned prominently in an article promoting the series in promotional title Marvel Age, which also saw the character 'duet' alongside Fred Hembeck in a humor strip. Similar reasoning saw Joe Jusko contribute a painted cover, which was used on both the comic and the album.

Tavares made an impromptu visit to Marvel headquarters soon afterwards (posing for pictures with Dutter) and was hugely impressed with Lee's sketches; knowing little of the comic industry, she was reportedly perplexed and disappointed to find Lee wouldn't be drawing the comic itself due to his commitments on the best-selling Uncanny X-Men. Instead the art for the special itself was provided by Denys Cowan and Jimmy Palmiotti. Both Dutter and Budiansky would recall Tavares as a very pleasant person, but felt she was heavily controlled by Kessler. A costume based on Lee's design was created for Tavares to wear on promotional appearances. Lee and the in-character Tavares made several promotional appearances, including on television shows such as ABC's Into the Night With Rick Dees, Dance Party USA and The Party Machine with Nia Peeples.

== Publishing history ==
A 52-page 'prestige format' one-shot featuring the character was dated April 1991, intended to be followed by more adventures in response to anticipated heavy demand; Dutter wrote a story featuring the character in the Marvel Universe, teaming up with Spider-Man to battle Mysterio. However, both the Nightcat comic and simultaneously released album met with poor sales, and the Spider-Man appearance was rejected. Nightcat would make only one more appearance, in a small in-universe record review in the 1991 edition of yearbook Marvel: The Year in Review.

== Fictional character biography ==
Jackie Tavares is a 19-year old growing up in Queens with her parents, dreaming of being a singer. Her father is an undercover police officer, and the stressful situation causes her mother to slip into fatal alcoholism. Her father enrolls her in college, and forces her to swear to abandon the idea of becoming an entertainer. In order to pursue her desires to be a singer, she devises the persona of superheroine Nightcat for her on-stage performances. As Nightcat she wins a talent contest and a recording deal with LMR Records, but blunders into a drug deal at the studio, earning the enmity of major dealer Amanda Gideon - who her father is investigating. Gideon has Nightcat used as a guinea pig for a new designer drug. Instead of killing Jackie, the drug grants her cat-like powers. However, her father is killed during her escape and Jackie vows to use her powers to avenge him - also creating a custom car called the Cat-illac. She storms Gideon's headquarters and battles the ringleader on top of the skyscraper. Gideon is left dangling from Nightcat's hair, and when she tries to pull the hero over Jackie uses her claws to cut the lock, sending the villain to her death. After a successful concert she is met by a journalist, announcing that "the cat has just begin to prowl.".

== Album ==
Studio album by Nightcat
- Released: 1991
- Studio: Jive Records
- Genre: Dance-pop
- Length: 33:59
- Label: LMR; RCA Records
- Producer: Jeff Franzel; Ken Cedar; Warren Allen Brooks

While Tavarez did sing some of the vocals for the album much of the vocals were performed by session singer Nikki Greggoroff, who had previously performed with Peter Allen and Joe Jackson. In 2017 she would recall that the sessions were "definitely a lot of fun". Bob Budiansky recalled being unimpressed with the music, though he acknowledged the genre wasn't to his taste. The album was released on cassette and CD.> The track "#1 House Rule" was also released as a single, but like the album it failed to chart.

Excerpts from the songs "#1 House Rules", "Don't Change" and "I've Finally Found Someone" were featuring in the comic.

=== Track listing ===
Night Cat track listing
No.	Title	Length
1.	"#1 House Rule"	3:44
2.	"Let Me Be Your Only Girl"	3:33
3.	"If You Love Me"	3:33
4.	"I've Finally Found Someone"	4:42
5.	"Don't Change"	3:42
6.	"Say You'll Be Mine"	3:07
7.	"In The Night Time"	3:10
8.	"Your Love Is All I Need"	3:25
9.	"Hang On To Your Loving"	3:15
Total length:		33:59

== Reception ==
Louise Lawrence (under her pen name Elizabeth Holden) reviewed the title for Amazing Heroes, and while she expressed reservations about the character's promotion she described the comic as having "considerable charm", praising Cowan's art and Stan Lee's cameo appearance. Elsewhere in the magazine, Adam-Troy Castro was less charitable, calling the character a "cynical gimmick" and criticising the similarities to Dazzler while noting that Nightcat resembled a "biker slut Wolverine". He also suggested it was highly likely Tavares was lip syncing "Milli Vanilli-style". In a later issue, Stefan Dinter found the album similarly inoffensive, considering it derivative of chart material of the time by the likes of Madonna and Paula Abdul. He also noted that the material had received very little airplay, and was hard to find in stores.

Retrospective reception of the concept has been less kind. Sam Scott of Looper considered Nightcat one of Marvel's "biggest forgotten failures", criticising both the character's costume and Lee's connection with the record-buying public. Comic Book Resources would place Nightcat as #1 on a list of 15 Marvel stories "Stan Lee wishes you would forget" and behind only Stripperella on a similar listicle of the most "WTF" things Lee had done.

Tom Brevoort was Bob Budiansky's assistant at the time; he later referred to the comic as "dumb" and noted the plot's similarities to the critically panned 2004 film adaptation of DC Comics' Catwoman.
