= Because I Love You (The Postman Song) =

1990 song by Stevie B

- US retail cassette single

Single by Stevie B

from the album Love & Emotion
- B-side: "Love Me for Life"
- Released: September 1, 1990
- Genre: Pop
- Length: 5:05 (album version); 3:46 (radio edit)
- Label: LMR; RCA
- Songwriter: Warren Allen Brooks
- Producer: Stevie B

Stevie B singles chronology
"Love & Emotion" (1990)	"Because I Love You (The Postman Song)" (1990)	"I'll Be by Your Side" (1991)

"Because I Love You (The Postman Song)" (or simply titled "Because I Love You") is a song written by Warren Allen Brooks and performed by American singer, songwriter, and record producer Stevie B. It was released in September 1990 by LMR and RCA Records from his third album, Love & Emotion (1990). The song peaked at number one on the US Billboard Hot 100 chart in December 1990 and remained there for four consecutive weeks. It also reached the top 10 in several countries worldwide, including Belgium and the Netherlands, where it peaked at number two. It received a gold certification in Australia and the United States. In August 2018, Billboard ranked the song the 71st-biggest hit in the history of the Hot 100.

== Track listings ==
- CD single
1. "Because I Love You (The Postman Song)" (radio edit) – 3:46
2. "Love Me for Life" (radio edit) – 3:06
- CD maxi
1. "Because I Love You (The Postman Song)" (radio edit) – 3:46
2. "Love Me for Life" (radio edit) – 3:06
3. "Because I Love You (The Postman Song)" – 5:00
4. "Love Me for Life" – 5:16
- 7-inch single
1. "Because I Love You (The Postman Song)" (radio edit) – 3:46
2. "Love Me for Life" (radio edit) – 3:06
- 12-inch maxi
1. "Because I Love You (The Postman Song)" – 5:00
2. "Love Me for Life" – 5:16

== Charts ==
=== Weekly charts ===
Weekly chart performance for "Because I Love You (The Postman Song)"
Chart (1990–1991)	Peak position
Australia (ARIA)	8
Belgium (Ultratop 50 Flanders)	2
Canada Top Singles (RPM)	7
Canada Adult Contemporary (RPM)	1
Europe (Eurochart Hot 100)	5
Europe (European Hit Radio)	7
Finland (Suomen virallinen lista)	18
France (SNEP)	8
Germany (GfK)	9
Ireland (IRMA)	7
Japan (Oricon)	31
Netherlands (Dutch Top 40)	3
Netherlands (Single Top 100)	2
New Zealand (Recorded Music NZ)	9
Norway (VG-lista)	4
Portugal (AFP)	6
Sweden (Sverigetopplistan)	4
Switzerland (Schweizer Hitparade)	22
UK Singles (Official Charts)	6
UK Airplay (Music Week)	3
US Billboard Hot 100	1
US Adult Contemporary (Billboard)	1
US Cash Box Top 100	1

=== Year-end charts ===
Year-end chart performance for "Because I Love You (The Postman Song)"
Chart (1991)	Position
Australia (ARIA)	49
Belgium (Ultratop)	15
Canada Top Singles (RPM)	70
Canada Adult Contemporary (RPM)	31
Europe (European Hot 100 Singles)	45
Europe (European Hit Radio)	41
Germany (Media Control)	30
Netherlands (Dutch Top 40)	39
Netherlands (Single Top 100)	38
Sweden (Topplistan)	21
UK Singles (OCC)	68
US Billboard Hot 100	12
US Adult Contemporary (Billboard)	21

=== Decade-end charts ===
Decade-end chart performance for "Because I Love You (The Postman Song)"
Chart (1990–1999)	Position
US Billboard Hot 100	72

=== All-time charts ===
All-time chart performance for "Because I Love You (The Postman Song)"
Chart (1990–2018)	Position
US Billboard Hot 100	71

== Certifications ==
Certifications for "Because I Love You (The Postman Song)"
Region	Certification	Certified units/sales
Australia (ARIA)	Gold	35,000^{^}
Japan (RIAJ)	Platinum	100,000^{^}
United States (RIAA)	Gold	500,000^{^}
^{^} Shipments figures based on certification alone.

== Release history ==
Release dates and formats for "Because I Love You (The Postman Song)"
Region	Date	Format(s)	Label(s)	Ref.
United States	September 1, 1990	—N/a	LMR; RCA	
Japan	January 25, 1991	Mini-CD	InsideOut	
Australia	January 28, 1991	7-inch vinyl; 12-inch vinyl; cassette	BCM; Liberation	
Australia	February 25, 1991	CD	BCM; Liberation	

== Other versions ==
In 1992, saxophonist Richard Elliot covered the song from his album Soul Embrace.

In 2007, German trance group Groove Coverage covered the song and released it as the group's first ever single, especially from its Greatest Hits album. Like most of Groove Coverage's songs it is sung by Mell, with Verena providing vocals during the song's bridge. The version peaked at number 58 on the official Austrian top 40 and number 72 on the official German top 100 singles charts.

== See also ==
- List of Hot Adult Contemporary number ones of 1991
