= Spring Love (Come Back to Me) =

Single by Stevie B

from the album Party Your Body
- Released: July 9, 1988
- Genre: Freestyle
- Length: 4:56
- Label: LMR Records
- Songwriter: Stevie B
- Producers: Stevie B, Tolga Katas

Stevie B singles chronology
"Dreamin' of Love" (1988)	"Spring Love" (1988)	"I Wanna Be the One" (1988)

"Spring Love", also known as "Spring Love (Come Back to Me)", is the third single from freestyle singer Stevie B's debut album Party Your Body, released in 1988. The song achieved a higher chart placement compared to Stevie B's previous single, almost reaching the Top 40 of the Billboard Hot 100 (peaking at No. 43) and paving the way for his top 40 breakthrough the following year with the similar-sounding "I Wanna Be the One". "Spring Love" also became Stevie B's first top ten hit on the Dance charts, peaking at number 5, and it remains one of his most popular songs.

In 2007, Stevie B re-recorded the song with rapper Pitbull, which was included on the album The Terminator.

== Track listings ==
7" single - Spain

No.	Title	Length
1.	"Spring Love"
2.	"I Need You"

7" single - United States

No.	Title	Length
1.	"Spring Love (Come Back to Me)" (Short Version)	3:48
2.	"Spring Love (Come Back to Me)" (Long Version)	4:56

CD maxi-single - West Germany

Spring Love (Come Back to Me)
No.	Title	Length
1.	"Spring Love (Come Back to Me)" (Radio Mix)	4:56
2.	Untitled (Club Mix)	5:56
3.	"Spring Love (Come Back to Me)" (Dub)	6:18
4.	Untitled (Short Version)	3:48
5.	Untitled (Per Capella & Bonus Beats)	3:22

== Charts ==
Chart (1988)	Peak position
Canada 20 Dance Singles (RPM)	3
US Billboard Hot 100	43
US Hot Dance Music/Club Play	5
US Hot Dance Music/Maxi-Singles Sales	2

== Covers ==
- In 1995, the singer Abdullah released his version on the album Depende de Nós.
- In 1998, the singer Captain G.Q. released his version on the album Planet Freestyle ∙ Volume 3.
- In 2003, the singer Huey Dunbar launched his version (in Spanish and English) on the album Music for My Peoples.
- In 2008, the singer Latino released his version, which contains the participation of Stevie B in the album Junto e Misturado.
- In 2014, the singer Nobel Pryze released his version produced by Mastakriz LaGuira (Alternative Merengue).

== Impact on popular culture ==
- In 2003, Brazilian funk singer MC Fornalha released the single "Paga Spring Love", inspired by the song by Stevie B.
- In 2024, Fat Joe released the single "Paradise" feat. Anitta (singer) & DJ Khaled, who samples the song by Stevie B.
