= In Your Eyes =

In Your Eyes may refer to:

== Film ==
- In Your Eyes, a 2004 film featuring Michael DeLorenzo
- In Your Eyes (2010 film), a Philippine romantic drama
- In Your Eyes (2014 film), a film written by Joss Whedon and directed by Brin Hill

== Music ==
=== Albums ===
- In Your Eyes (D. Train album) or the title song, 1988
- In Your Eyes (George Benson album) or the title song (see below), 1983
- ...In Your Eyes, by Mary MacGregor, or the title song, 1978
- In Your Eyes (EP), by Gary Hughes, or the title song, 1998
- In Your Eyes, by Amberlife, 2004
- In Your Eyes, by Nutshell, 1976
- ...In Your Eyes, by Andy Fraser, 1975

=== Songs ===
- "In Your Eyes" (George Benson song), 1983
- "In Your Eyes" (Inna song), 2013
- "In Your Eyes" (Kylie Minogue song), 2002
- "In Your Eyes" (Niamh Kavanagh song), winner at Eurovision 1993
- "In Your Eyes" (Peter Gabriel song), 1986
- "In Your Eyes" (Robin Schulz song), 2020
- "In Your Eyes" (The Weeknd song), 2020
- "In Your Eyes", by Anastacia from Pieces of a Dream, 2005
- "In Your Eyes", by BadBadNotGood from IV, 2016
- "In Your Eyes", by Bucks Fizz, a B-side of the single "New Beginning", 1986
- "In Your Eyes", by Circle Jerks from Golden Shower of Hits, 1983
- "In Your Eyes", by Dionne Warwick from Dionne, 1979
- "In Your Eyes", by Jessie Ware from What's Your Pleasure?, 2020
- "In Your Eyes", by Joan Armatrading from What's Inside, 1995
- "In Your Eyes", by John Frusciante from Letur-Lefr, 2012
- "In Your Eyes", by John Norum from Face the Truth, 1992
- "In Your Eyes", by Rational Youth from Rational Youth, 1983
- "In Your Eyes", by Shaya, 2011
- "In Your Eyes", by Snoh Aalegra from Temporary Highs in the Violet Skies, 2021
- "In Your Eyes", by Status Quo from In the Army Now, 1986
- "In Your Eyes", by Terry McDermott, 2013
- "In Your Eyes", by Tribal Seeds, 2011
- "In Your Eyes", by War from Deliver the Word, 1983

== See also ==
- "It's in Your Eyes", a 1996 song by Phil Collins
- "It's in Your Eyes", a 2001 song by Sloan from Pretty Together
- In My Eyes (disambiguation)
- Into Your Eyes
- Your Eyes (disambiguation)
