= Dreamin' of Love =

Single by Stevie B

from the album Party Your Body
- Released: April 23, 1988
- Genre: Freestyle
- Length: 4:10 (album version)
- Label: LMR
- Songwriter: Stevie B
- Producer: Stevie B

Stevie B singles chronology
"Party Your Body" (1987)	"Dreamin' of Love" (1988)	"Spring Love (Come Back to Me)" (1988)

"Dreamin' of Love" is the second single from freestyle singer Stevie B's debut album Party Your Body. It was his first single to chart in Billboard Hot 100. "Dreamin' of Love" contain samples of the song "Do You Have a Car" by Kid Seville.

== Track listing ==
US 12" single

No.	Title	Length
1.	"Dreamin' of Love" (Vocal)	5:03
2.	"Dreamin' of Love" (Dub)	4:34

== Charts ==
Chart (1988)	Peak Position
U.S. Billboard Hot 100	80
U.S. Billboard Hot Dance Music/Club Play	21
U.S. Billboard Hot Dance Music/Maxi-Singles Sales	8
