= Party Your Body =

Studio album by Stevie B
- Released: 1988
- Recorded: 1987
- Genre: Freestyle
- Length: 39:46
- Label: LMR / BCM
- Producer: Stevie B, Tolga Katas, Herb Moelis

Stevie B chronology
| Party Your Body (1988) | In My Eyes (1989) |

Singles from Party Your Body
- 1. "Party Your Body" Released: 1987; 2. "Dreamin' of Love" Released: 1988; 3. "Spring Love" Released: 1988

Professional ratings
Review scores
| Source | Rating |
|---|---|
| AllMusic | 2/5 stars |
| The Rolling Stone Album Guide | 3/5 stars |

Party Your Body is the debut album by Miami, Florida-based freestyle/dance musician Stevie B. Released in 1988, the album featured the title track, which was a big hit in the clubs, as well as the even more successful follow-up singles "Dreamin' of Love" and "Spring Love," the latter of which went to No. 5 on the dance chart and nearly cracked the top 40 on the U.S. pop chart.

== Track listings ==
LMR Records

1. "Party Your Body" – 4:32
2. "I Need You" – 5:05
3. "Stop the Love" – 4:56
4. "Day n' Night" – 5:03
5. "Dreamin' of Love" – 4:08
6. "No More Tears" – 6:01
7. "Spring Love" – 5:03
8. "Baby I'm a Fool for Love" – 4:50

BCM Records

1. "Spring Love" – 5:03
2. "I Need You" – 5:05
3. "Stop the Love" – 4:56
4. "Day n' Night" – 5:03
5. "Baby I'm a Fool for Love" – 4:50
6. "Party Your Body" – 4:32
7. "Dreamin' of Love" – 4:08
8. "No More Tears" – 6:01

== Certifications ==
| Country | Music recording sales certification | Date | Certified sales |
|---|---|---|---|
| US RIAA | Gold | October 10, 1990 | 500,000 |

== Charts ==
| Chart (1988) | Peak position |
|---|---|
| US Billboard 200 | 78 |
| US Billboard Top R&B Albums | 63 |
