= For Your Eyes Only =

For Your Eyes Only may refer to:

- For Your Eyes Only (short story collection), by Ian Fleming, 1960
  - "For Your Eyes Only" (short story), the title short story from the collection
- For Your Eyes Only (film), a 1981 James Bond film
  - For Your Eyes Only (soundtrack), soundtrack album for the film
  - "For Your Eyes Only" (song), used in the film, sung by Sheena Easton
  - "For Your Eyes Only", alternative song for the film by Blondie, on The Hunter (Blondie album)
- For Your Eyes Only (magazine), a 1980s gaming magazine
- "For Your Eyes Only" (ALF), a 1986 television episode
- 4 Your Eyez Only, 2016 album by rapper J. Cole
- J. Cole: 4 Your Eyez Only, 2017 documentary by rapper J. Cole

== See also ==
- Eyes only, security classification
- "For Your Eye Only", an episode of the animated series Ultimate Spider-Man
- "Fur Your Eyes Only", a song by Shaggy and Alaine
