= Girl I Am Searching for You =

Single by Stevie B

from the album In My Eyes
- Released: 1989
- Genre: Dance-pop, Freestyle
- Length: 4:46 (album version)
- Label: LMR
- Songwriter(s): Stevie B
- Producer(s): Stevie B

Stevie B singles chronology
"In My Eyes" (1989)	"Girl I Am Searching for You" (1989)	"Love Me for Life" (1990)

"Girl I Am Searching for You" is the third single from freestyle singer Stevie B's second album In My Eyes.

== Track listing ==
US CD Maxi single

No.	Title	Length
1.	"Girl I Am Searching for You" (Album Version)	4:45
2.	"Girl I Am Searching for You" (Short Version)	4:16
3.	"Girl I Am Searching for You" (Extended Mix)	5:52
4.	"Searching for Your House: "Part A (Subterranean Mix)"; "Part B (Non-Stop Mix)"	12:31
5.	"Girl I Am Searching for You" (Moon Mix)	4:51
6.	"Searching for a Dub/Come with Me" (With a Spoon Dub)	9:59
7.	"Searching for the Meaning of Spooge"	3:09

== Charts ==
Chart (1989)	Peak position
Canada RPM Top 100	4
US Billboard Hot 100	56
US Billboard Hot Dance Music/Maxi-Singles Sales	17
