= In My Eyes (Stevie B song) =

Single by Stevie B

from the album In My Eyes
- Released: 1989
- Genre: Dance-pop, freestyle
- Length: 5:18 (album version)
- Label: LMR
- Songwriter: Stevie B
- Producer: Stevie B

Stevie B singles chronology
"I Wanna Be the One" (1989)	"In My Eyes" (1989)	"Girl I Am Searching for You" (1989)

Alternative covers
- CD Maxi single

"In My Eyes" is the title track and second single from freestyle singer Stevie B's second album In My Eyes. The song became a hit single, entering the Top 40 on the Billboard Hot 100 at # 37.

== Track listing ==
US 12" single

No.	Title	Length
1.	"In My Eyes" (Radio Mix)	5:09
2.	"In My Eyes" (In My House)	6:02
3.	"In My Eyes" (Bonus Spooge)	3:34
4.	"In My Eyes" (Dancing Eyes)	5:12
5.	"In My Eyes" (Destiny vs. Curiosity Dub)	9:48

Germany Maxi Single 2001

No.	Title	Length
1.	"In My Eyes" (Radio Cut)	3:35
2.	"In My Eyes" (Original)	5:15
3.	"Because I Love You"	4:20

== Charts ==
Chart (1989–1990)	Peak Position
Canada - Canada RPM Top 100 Singles	58
Canada - Canada RPM Dance/Urban	4
U.S. Billboard Hot 100	37
U.S. Billboard Hot Dance Music/Club Play	21
U.S. Billboard Hot Dance Music/Maxi-Singles Sales	11

== Annual positions ==
Stop year end (1989)	Best position
Canada - Canada RPM Dance Top 25 Singles of '89	25
