= It's So Good =

Studio album by Stevie B
- Released: April 29, 2000
- Genre: Dance, freestyle
- Label: Bolari Records
- Producer: Robert Bigelow

Stevie B chronology
Freestyle Then And Now! (1999)	It's So Good (2000)	This Time... (2006)

It's So Good is the tenth studio album by freestyle musician Stevie B, released on April 29, 2000, by Bolari Records. Two singles, "It's So Good" and "You Are the One" (a cover of the song originally released by Count to Twenty), were released, but neither charted.

It's So Good reached No. 99 in a one-week stay on the charts in Germany.

== Track listing ==
No.	Title	Length
1.	"Since You've Been Gone Away"	4:16
2.	"Young Girl" (Freestyle Mix)	5:13
3.	"Rio Party Nights"	4:33
4.	"Baila (Dance with Me)"	4:15
5.	"I Lost My Love Today"	4:31
6.	"Mira Mira"	3:25
7.	"Can You Hear Me Now"	4:32
8.	"You Are the One"	4:09
9.	"My Mother's Eyes"	3:55
10.	"Give Me Just a Little More Time"	4:37
11.	"It's So Good"	4:38
12.	"Young Girl" (Urban Mix)	5:10

== Charts ==
Chart (2000)	Peak position
Germany (Media Control Charts)	99
