= I Wanna Be the One =

Single by Stevie B

from the album In My Eyes
- Released: 1988
- Genre: Dance-pop, Freestyle
- Length: 5:02 (album version)
- Label: LMR
- Songwriter(s): Stevie B
- Producer(s): Stevie B

Stevie B singles chronology
"Spring Love (Come Back to Me)" (1988)	"I Wanna Be the One" (1988)	"In My Eyes" (1989)

"I Wanna Be the One" is a song by American freestyle artist, Stevie B, released as the lead single from his album, In My Eyes, from 1989. The tune became Stevie B.'s first American top-40 hit, peaking at number 32 in early 1989.

== Track listings ==
7" single

No.	Title	Length
1.	"I Wanna Be the One" (Radio Mix)	4:54
2.	"I Wanna Be the One" (Extended Mix)	6:58

12" single

No.	Title	Length
1.	"I Wanna Be the One" (Radio Mix)	4:54
2.	"I Wanna Be the One" (Extended Mix)	6:58
3.	"I Wanna Be the One" (Blissapella)	5:20
4.	"I Wanna Be the One" (Percapella)	5:51

== Charts ==
Chart (1989)	Peak position
Canada RPM Dance / Urban	3
US Billboard Hot 100	32
US Hot Dance Music/Club Play	39
US Hot Dance Music/Maxi-Singles Sales	12
