= Love & Emotion (song) =

"Love & Emotion" is the first single from the album Love & Emotion, released by freestyle music singer Stevie B in 1990. It is the first song from Stevie B to enter the top 15 of the Billboard Hot 100 and the first to enter the singles chart in Germany, where it reached No. 31. A music video was shot for the song.

== Tracks ==
7" single

No.	Title	Length
1.	"Love & Emotion" (LP Version)	3:41
2.	"Love & Emotion" (Mean)	3:28

12" / CD single

No.	Title	Length
1.	"Love & Emotion" (LP Version)	3:41
2.	"Love & Emotion" (Mean Mix)	7:54
3.	"Love & Emotion" (Rhythm Method Mix)	6:07
4.	"Love & Emotion" (Nasty B-Boy Mix)	5:40

12" promo single

No.	Title	Length
1.	"Love & Emotion" (Mean Mix)	7:54
2.	"Love & Emotion" (Mean R & B 7 Edit)	3:12
3.	"Love & Emotion" (LP Version)	3:41
4.	"Love & Emotion" (Rhythm Method Mix)	6:07
5.	"Love & Emotion" (Nasty B-Boy Mix)	5:40
6.	"Love & Emotion" (Hot Radio Edit)	3:21

12" promo single

No.	Title	Length
1.	"Love & Emotion" (Mean R & B 12" Edit)	6:08
2.	"Love & Emotion" (Mean R & B 7" Edit)	3:12

== Charts ==
Chart (1990)	Peak position
Canada RPM Top 100 Singles	55
Canada RPM Dance / Urban	2
German Singles Top 100	31
US Billboard Hot 100	15
US Hot Dance Music/Club Play	43
US Hot Dance Music/Maxi-Singles Sales	21

=== Year-end charts ===
Chart (1990)	Rank
Canada RPM Top 50 Dance Tracks of 1990	45
