= For Your Eye Only =

- Ultimate Spider-Man episode
- Episode no.: Season 1 Episode 15
- Directed by: Jeff Allen; Alex Soto
- Written by: Brian Michael Bendis
- Story by: Jim Steranko
- Editing by: Jonathan Polk
- Production code: Man of Action
- Original air date: July 22, 2012

Episode chronology
| ← Previous "Awesome" | Next → "Beetle Mania" |

"For Your Eye Only" is the fifteenth episode of the first season of the animated series Ultimate Spider-Man, the episode is both a parody of classic James Bond films and a loose adaptation of Jim Steranko's 60s storyline "Who is Scorpio?" from the Nick Fury, Agent of S.H.I.E.L.D. comic.

== Production ==
The episode was written by Brian Michael Bendis. The art-design was handled by Micah Gunnell, Tom Morgan, Shaun O'Neil, Andy Thom, and Eric Wight who are mainly storyboardists. The episode's sound was controlled by Jesse Aruda (Note: Credited as Jesse Arruda) (sound designer), David W. Barr (original dialogue mixer), Mike Draghi (re recording mixer and supervising sound editor), Ryan Johnston (assistant engineer), Glenn Oyabe (sound designing) and Joseph Tsai (sound effects editor). The visual effects were by George Rizkallah (post production supervisor and visual effects supervisor) and Brad Strickman (visual effects artist). Animation was done by Justin Copeland (main storyboard artist), Walter Gatus (main character designer) and Brad Strickman (main title animator).

The episode stars Chi McBride as Nick Fury, Drake Bell as Spider-Man and introduces Phil Morris as Max Fury, who was cast by Collette Sunderman who also handled voice directing for the episode. In the comics, Nick Fury's brother is named Jake Fury, while Max is a Life Model Decoy android copy of Nick Fury.

== Plot ==
After being lectured by Nick Fury Jr., Spider-Man stops believing in his advice. When Fury comes back and finds him referencing James Bond movies while using S.H.I.E.L.D. technology, both Spider-Man and Fury get angry at each other and storm off. When Spider-Man comes back the next day, he notices that the S.H.I.E.L.D headquarters is being attacked by Zodiac. Spider-Man confronts Zodiac's leader, Scorpio, who tells him Fury is dead. Spider-Man escapes from the Zodiac soldiers and gets into the trash compactor, before making his way to the medical bay and rescuing Fury. He and Fury make their way through the Helicarrier and defeat Zodiac soldiers using special technology. Spider-Man and Fury find Scorpio next, and fight him, with Fury activating a function which sends the Helicarrier into the ocean. Fury then fights Scorpio and rips off his mask, revealing him to be Fury's brother, Max. Max escapes and declares war, then escapes. The Helicarrier resurfaces and Spider-Man agrees he should listen to Fury's advice.

== Reception ==
The reviewer of NewtCave expressed that he thought Phil Morris delivered a solid performance despite what was in his opinion rather stereotypical villain dialogue.
