= In My Eyes (Stevie B album) =

Studio album by Stevie B
- Released: February 3, 1989
- Genre: Freestyle, Dance
- Length: 45:34
- Label: LMR / RCA
- Producer: Stevie B

Stevie B chronology
Party Your Body (1988)	In My Eyes (1989)	Love & Emotion (1990)

Singles from In My Eyes
- 1. "I Wanna Be the One" Released: 1988; 2. "In My Eyes" Released: 1989; 3. "Girl I Am Searching for You" Released: 1989; 4. "Love Me for Life" Released: 1990

Professional ratings
Review scores
Source	Rating
Allmusic	2/5 stars

In My Eyes is the second album released by soul/freestyle/dance musician Stevie B. This album featured Stevie's first top 40 pop hit, with the lead-off track "I Wanna Be the One" reaching #32. The next single, the title track "In My Eyes" followed its predecessor into the top 40, while the third single, "Girl I Am Searching for You" also became a moderate hit. However, the fourth single released, "Love Me for Life" became the most successful track from the album, peaking at #29 on the pop charts.

== Track listing (LMR Records & BCM Records) ==
- All songs written by Stevie B., except where noted.
1. "I Wanna Be the One" – 5:02
2. "Girl I Am Searching for You" – 4:44
3. "I Came to Rock Your Body" – 5:02
4. "Love Me for Life" – 5:19 (Stevie B, Dadgel Atabay)
5. "In My Eyes" – 5:17
6. "Lifetime Love Affair" – 4:14 (B., Glenn Gutierrez)
7. "Come with Me" – 4:44
8. "Children of Tomorrow" – 4:44

Bonus tracks

No.	Title	Length
9.	"I Wanna Be the One" (Bonus Mix)	6:57
10.	"In My Eyes" (Bonus "In My House" Mix)	6:02
11.	"Girl I Am Searching for You" (Bonus Mix)	5:49

== Certifications ==
Country	Music recording sales certification	Date	Sales certified
US RIAA	Gold	16 August 1989	500,000

== Charts ==
Chart (1989)	Peak position
Canada RPM Top 100 Albums	28
US Billboard 200	75
US Top R&B Albums (Billboard)	75

=== Year-end position ===
Chart (1989)	Position
Canada RPM Top Albums	100

== Personnel ==
- Stevie B.: Keyboards, Drum & Computer Programming, All Vocals
- Glenn Gutierrez: Computer Programming

== Production ==
- Executive Producer: Herb Moelis
- Arranged by Stevie B., Dadgel Atabay & Glenn Gutierrez
- All songs recorded and mixed by Stevie B. & Jimmy Starr, except "Girl I Am Searching for You", "I Came To Rock your Body" and "Children of Tomorrow", which were recorded and mixed by Stevie B. & Tolga Katas
- Mastered by Herb Powers
- All songs published by MyaT Music/Saja Music Publishing.
