= I'll Be by Your Side =

"I'll Be by Your Side" is the third single from the album Love & Emotion, released by Freestyle music singer Stevie B in 1991. Although it didn't achieve the same success as the previous single, "Because I Love You (The Postman Song)", the song peaked at No. 12 on the Billboard Hot 100 and reached the Top 40 in Canada, peaking at No. 38.

== Track listings ==
Germany CD single

No.	Title	Length
1.	"I'll Be by Your Side" (Radio Edit)	4:16
2.	"I'll Be by Your Side"	5:03
3.	"Party Your Body" (Radio Edit)	3:41
4.	"Party Your Body" (LP Version)	5:24

UK 12" single

No.	Title	Length
1.	"I'll Be by Your Side"	5:00
2.	"I'll Be by Your Side" (Radio Edit)	4:10
3.	"Party Your Body"	5:24

France 7" single

No.	Title	Length
1.	"I'll Be by Your Side" (Radio Edit)	4:11
2.	"Headline2 Party Your Body" (Radio Edit)	3:38

== Charts ==
Chart (1991)	Peak position
Australia (ARIA Charts)	73
Canada RPM Top 100 Singles	38
US Billboard Hot 100	12
