= Stevie B =

American musician and record producer

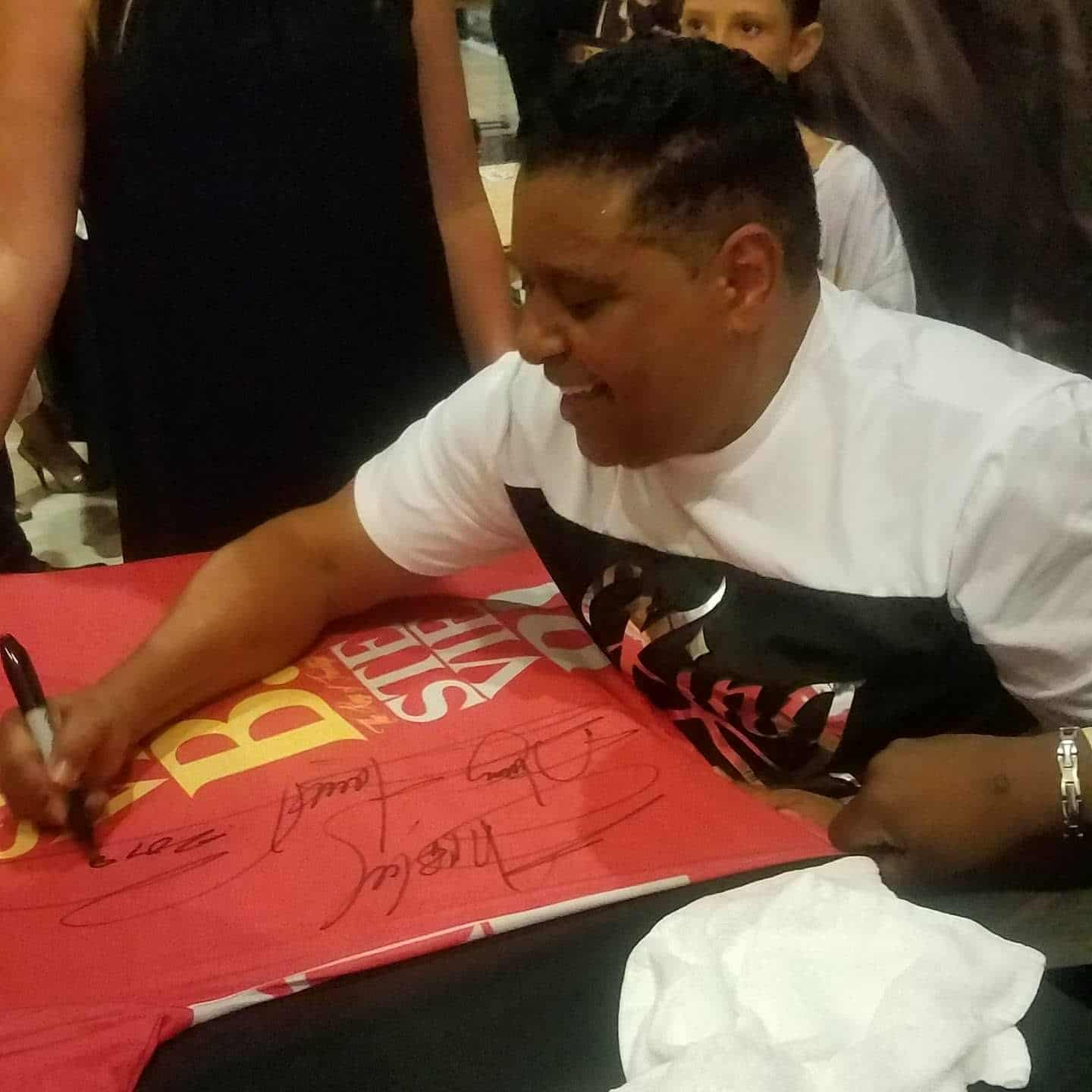

Background information
- Born: Steven Bernard Hill; April 19, 1958 (age 68); Fort Lauderdale, Florida, U.S.
- Origin: Miami, Florida, U.S.
- Genres: Dance; Latin freestyle; R&B; pop; electronic
- Occupations: Singer; songwriter; record producer
- Instruments: Vocals; electronic keyboards; drum machine
- Years active: 1987–present
- Labels: LMR; RCA Records; Saja/Atlantic Records; Empire Musicwerks; VI Music; Universal Records

Steven Bernard Hill (born April 19, 1958), known professionally as Stevie B, is an American singer, songwriter, and record producer who was influential in the freestyle and hi-NRG dance music scene of the late 1980s, mostly in Miami. He had a 1990 number-one hit ballad, "Because I Love You (The Postman Song)".

== Early life and career ==
Steven Bernard Hill was born on April 19, 1958, in Fort Lauderdale, Florida. He worked a variety of jobs – from car washing to fast food – before gaining recognition for his 1987 national club smash, "Party Your Body". It was also the title track of his 1988 debut LP, which eventually went gold. In 1989, he had his first top 40 hits with "I Wanna Be the One", "In My Eyes" and "Love Me For Life". With his 1990 album, Love & Emotion, he reached the height of his success, with the accompanying single, "Because I Love You" enjoying four weeks at number one on the U.S. Billboard Hot 100 in December 1990. He had two other top 15 hits from Love and Emotion with "I'll Be by Your Side" and the title track from the album.

In 1995, a quasi-greatest hits album was released by Universal Records in the Philippines, simply titled "Dream About You." It contained singles from his previous albums including "Funky Melody", "Running Back", "Waiting for Your Love", among others. It also included as bonus the live version of "Because I Love You" which was recorded in his Tokyo concert, along with a ballad version of "If You Still Love Me." Two more tracks were added as bonus: "You're the One I Think About" and "Quiereme Por Vida." This album likewise featured 2 additional versions of "Dream About You," one with only synthesizers as accompaniment with no drums and percussion, and the other called 'Drop Mix' which prominently featured heavy bass guitar and bass drums.

In 1998, The Best of Stevie B was re-released, highlighting the light dance-pop sound that marked the start of his career.

In August 2009, he released The Terminator which features the lead single "Running for Miles" and a remixed rendition of one of his biggest hits, "Spring Love", with a guest performance by Pitbull and the music video featuring Polish model Anita Sikorska.

On April 10, 2019, Hill took to Facebook to make a critical commentary about the lack of freestyle music and the current state of the genre in general.

== Personal life ==
On September 30, 2011, after his concert at MassMutual Center in Springfield, Massachusetts, police arrested Hill because he owed $420,000 in unpaid child support.

Hill's niece is actress and comedian Dulcé Sloan.

== Discography ==
=== Studio albums ===
List of albums, with selected chart positions and certifications
Title	Album details	Peak chart positions					Certifications
Title	Album details	US	AUS	CAN	GER	SWE	Certifications
Party Your Body	Released: 1988; Label: LMR, BCM; Formats: CD, LP, cassette	78	—	—	—	—	RIAA: Gold
In My Eyes	Released: 1989; Label: LMR, RCA; Formats: CD, LP, cassette	75	—	28	—	—	RIAA: Gold
Love & Emotion	Released: 1990; Label: LMR, RCA; Formats: CD, LP, cassette	54	87	—	—	50	RIAA: Gold
Healing	Released: 25 August 1992; Label: Epic; Formats: CD, LP, cassette	—	—	—	—	—	
Running Back	Released: 1993; Label: Spotlight; Formats: CD	—	—	—	—	—	
Funky Melody	Released: 1 November 1994; Label: Spotlight; Formats: CD	—	—	29	—	—	
Waiting for Your Love	Released: 1996; Label: Creative Music Entertainment; Formats: CD	—	—	—	—	—	
Summer Nights	Released: 1998; Label: ZYX Music; Formats: CD	—	—	—	—	—	
Right Here, Right Now!	Released: 1998; Label: Dance 2000; Formats: CD	—	—	—	—	—	
Freestyle Then and Now!	Released: 1999; Label: Dance 2000 / ZYX Music; Formats: CD	—	—	—	83	—	
It's So Good	Released: 29 April 2000; Label: A45 Music; Formats: CD	—	—	—	99	—	
This Time...	Released: 2006; Label: SPG Music; Formats: CD	—	—	—	—	—	
The Terminator	Released: 2009; Label: Universal Records; Formats: CD, digital download	—	—	—	—	—	
The King of Hearts	Released: 2014; Label: Stevie B Entertainment; Formats: CD, digital download	—	—	—	—	—	
Never Gonna Let You Go	Released: 6 January 2017; Label: Hill's Entertainment; Formats: CD, digital download	—	—	—	—	—	
Best of Life	Released: 16 January 2020; Label: Hill's Entertainment; Formats: digital download, stream	—	—	—	—	—	
"—" denotes items that did not chart or were not released.

=== Compilation albums ===
- 1991: Best of Stevie B
- 1992: Best of Stevie B (different track list)
- 1993: The Best of Stevie B (Brazil edition)
- 1996: The Best of Stevie B Vol. 2 (Brazil edition)
- 1996: Finally
- 1997: Hit Collection
- 1998: Best of Stevie B (reissued)
- 2001: The Greatest Hits
- 2004: The Greatest Hits Volume 2
- 2005: The World of Stevie B
- 2008: Greatest Freestyle Ballads
- 2009: B-Sides and Outtakes

=== Singles ===
Year	Single	Peak chart positions										Certifications	Album
Year	Single	US	US Dance	US R&B	US AC	AUS	CAN	GER	SWE	SWI	UK	Certifications	Album
1987	"Party Your Body"	—	40	69	—	—	—	—	—	—	—		Party Your Body
1988	"Dreamin' of Love"	80	21	—	—	—	—	—	—	—	—		Party Your Body
1988	"Spring Love (Come Back to Me)"	43	5	—	—	—	—	—	—	—	—		Party Your Body
1988	"I Wanna Be the One"	32	39	—	—	—	—	—	—	—	—		In My Eyes
1989	"In My Eyes"	37	21	—	—	—	58	—	—	—	—		In My Eyes
1989	"Girl I Am Searching for You"	56	—	—	—	—	4	—	—	—	—		In My Eyes
1990	"The Stevie B. Megamix"	—	—	—	—	—	—	17	—	—	—		In My Eyes
1990	"Love Me for Life"	29	—	—	—	—	—	—	—	—	—		In My Eyes
1990	"Love & Emotion"	15	43	—	—	—	55	31	—	—	—		Love & Emotion
1990	"Because I Love You (The Postman Song)"	1	—	—	1	8	7	9	4	22	6	RIAA: Gold; ARIA: Gold	Love & Emotion
1991	"I'll Be by Your Side"	12	—	—	16	73	38	—	—	—	—		Love & Emotion
1991	"Forever More"	96	—	—	—	—	—	—	—	—	—		Love & Emotion
1992	"Pump That Body"	—	15	—	—	—	— (Note: "Pump That Body" did not enter the Canadian Singles Chart, but peaked at number 6 on the Canadian Dance Chart.)	—	—	—	—		Healing
1992	"Prayer"	—	—	—	—	—	—	—	—	—	—		Healing
1994	"Funky Melody"	—	—	—	—	—	—	—	—	—	—		Funky Melody
1995	"Dream About You"	29	—	16	—	—	—	—	—	—	—		Funky Melody
1995	"If You Still Love Me"	—	—	—	—	—	—	—	—	—	—		Funky Melody
1995	"Waiting for Your Love"	—	—	—	—	—	—	—	—	—	—		Waiting for Your Love
1997	"Summer Nights"	—	—	—	—	—	—	—	—	—	—		Right Here, Right Now!
1998	"Megamix Vol. 2"	—	—	—	—	—	—	—	—	—	—		Right Here, Right Now!
1998	"If You Leave Me Now" (with Alexia Phillips)	—	—	—	—	—	—	—	—	—	—		Right Here, Right Now!
1999	"It's So Good"	—	—	—	—	—	—	—	—	—	—		It's So Good
1999	"Mega Freestyle"	—	—	—	—	—	—	—	—	—	—		It's So Good
1999	"Mega Mixx 2000"	—	—	—	—	—	—	—	—	—	—		It's So Good
2000	"You Are the One"	—	—	—	—	—	—	—	—	—	—		The Greatest Hits
2000	"Megafreestylemix" / "Young Girl"	—	—	—	—	—	—	—	—	—	—		The Greatest Hits
2000	"MegaMix 2001"	—	—	—	—	—	—	—	—	—	—		The Greatest Hits
2008	"Running for Miles"	—	—	—	—	—	—	—	—	—	—		The Terminator
2008	"Get This Party Started"	—	—	—	—	—	—	—	—	—	—		The Terminator
2009	"It Ain't Over"	—	—	—	—	—	—	—	—	—	—		The Terminator
2013	"Spring Love 2013" (featuring Pitbull)	—	—	—	—	—	—	87	—	—	—		Non-album single
2016	"Changing Faces"	—	—	—	—	—	—	—	—	—	—		Never Gonna Let You Go
2016	"Freestyle"	—	—	—	—	—	—	—	—	—	—		Never Gonna Let You Go
2023	"Take It All Back" (featuring Pitbull)	—	—	—	—	—	—	—	—	—	—		Non-album single
"—" denotes a recording that did not chart or was not released in that territory.

== Music videos ==
Year	Video
1988	"Dreamin' of Love"
1988	"Spring Love (Come Back to Me)"
1988	"I Wanna Be the One"
1989	"In My Eyes"
1990	"Love Me for Life"
1990	"Love & Emotion"
1990	"Because I Love You (The Postman Song)"
1992	"Pump That Body"
1995	"Dream About You"
2000	"You Are the One"
2008	"Running for Miles"

== See also ==
- List of artists who reached number one in the United States
