= Ultimate Spider-Man (TV series) =

American superhero animated series (2012–2017)

- Also known as: Ultimate Spider-Man: Web-Warriors (season 3); Ultimate Spider-Man vs. the Sinister 6 (season 4)
- Genre: Superhero; Action-adventure; Comedy-drama
- Based on: Spider-Man by: Stan Lee; Steve Ditko
- Developed by: Marvel Animation
- Voices of: Drake Bell; Dee Bradley Baker; Ogie Banks; Eric Bauza; Greg Cipes; Clark Gregg; Tom Kenny; Matt Lanter; Misty Lee; Caitlyn Taylor Love; Chi McBride; Logan Miller; Scott Porter; J. K. Simmons; Tara Strong; Milo Ventimiglia; Steven Weber
- Composer: Kevin Manthei
- Country of origin: United States
- Original language: English
- No. of seasons: 4
- No. of episodes: 104 (list of episodes)

Production
- Executive producers: Alan Fine; Dan Buckley; Joe Quesada; Jeph Loeb; Cort Lane (seasons 3–4); Stephen Wacker (seasons 3–4)
- Producer: Leanne Moreau (season 4)
- Running time: 22 minutes
- Production companies: Film Roman; Marvel Animation

Original release
- Network: Disney XD
- Release: April 1, 2012 – January 7, 2017

Related
- The Spectacular Spider-Man; Marvel's Spider-Man; Avengers Assemble; Hulk and the Agents of S.M.A.S.H. Guardians of the Galaxy

Ultimate Spider-Man (titled Ultimate Spider-Man: Web Warriors for the third season and Ultimate Spider-Man vs. the Sinister 6 for its final season) is an American superhero animated television series broadcast on the cable network Disney XD, based on the Spider-Man comics published by Marvel Comics. The series featured writers such as Brian Michael Bendis (who also created the comic book series of the same name), Paul Dini, and Man of Action (a group consisting of Steven T. Seagle, Joe Kelly, Joe Casey, and Duncan Rouleau).

It was first announced in summer 2011, and debuted alongside the second season of The Avengers: Earth's Mightiest Heroes as part of the Marvel Universe programming block on April 1, 2012. In a break from other series, Spider-Man breaks the fourth wall and speaks directly to the audience. It also includes fantasy sequences from Peter's mind.

The series concluded its run on January 7, 2017, with the two-part episode "Graduation Day" with four seasons each consisting of 26 episodes. Reruns continued to air on Disney XD until August 30, 2017.

== Synopsis ==
=== Season 1 (2012) ===
During the first season, Spider-Man is recruited to work for S.H.I.E.L.D. alongside Nova, White Tiger, Iron Fist, and Luke Cage, with whom he attends Midtown High School. Corrupt industrialist Norman Osborn targets Spider-Man in hopes of collecting his DNA to create a spider-soldier army. To this end, he uses Doctor Octopus as his pawn, having him send numerous supervillains after Spider-Man and use a sample of Spider-Man's blood to create the Venom symbiote, which bonds with Norman's son Harry Osborn. In the two-part season finale, Doctor Octopus takes revenge on Norman for his treatment of him and transforms him into the Green Goblin. In the ensuing battle, the S.H.I.E.L.D. Helicarrier is destroyed.

=== Season 2 (2013) ===
In the second season, the S.H.I.E.L.D. team moves into Peter's house, as they no longer have a home following the Helicarrier's destruction. In the season premiere, after learning that Spider-Man gained his powers from one of Oscorp's genetically altered spiders, Doctor Octopus creates serums with animal DNA in hopes of re-creating the process. S.H.I.E.L.D. scientist Curt Connors, who lost his right arm due to injuries from the Helicarrier's destruction, uses one of the serums to regrow his arm and becomes the Lizard. Later, Doctor Octopus controls the Lizard so that he can join him, Electro, Rhino, Kraven the Hunter, and Beetle as a member of the Sinister Six. While the S.H.I.E.L.D. Team defeat five of the six villains, Connors escapes and Spider-Man swears to find and cure him. Later the Sinister Six reappears with Beetle replaced by Scorpion. During the season, Spider-Man learns more about his teammates' origins: White Tiger became White Tiger after her father Hector was killed by Kraven, Nova is an orphan who was raised by the Guardians of the Galaxy, Danny Rand became Iron Fist after training in K'un-L'un and left it to further his training, and Luke Cage received his powers from a version of the Super-Soldier Formula developed by his parents. Norman Osborn is cured and becomes Iron Patriot, but Doctor Octopus later transforms him back into the Green Goblin.

=== Season 3: Web-Warriors (2014–2015) ===
In the third season, Spider-Man joins the Avengers, but eventually leaves to rejoin S.H.I.E.L.D. In the aftermath, Venom bonds with Flash Thompson to become Agent Venom and Nick Fury tasks Spider-Man to recruit other young heroes to form the New Warriors, consisting of Ka-Zar, Zabu, Amadeus Cho / Iron Spider, and Cloak and Dagger. The New Warriors battle the Thunderbolts, during which Green Goblin escapes with the Siege Perilous and travels the multiverse to collect DNA from Spider-Man's counterparts. Chasing after him, Spider-Man meets up with Spider-Man 2099, Spider-Girl, Spider-Man Noir, Spider-Ham, Spyder-Knight, and Miles Morales, and works with them to take down Spider-Goblin and Electro. After both are defeated and the alternate Spider-Men return to their homes, the Green Goblin reverts into Norman Osborn and sustains amnesia, making him forget his time as the Green Goblin. Afterwards, Spider-Man and his team begin their education at the S.H.I.E.L.D. Academy while dealing with Arnim Zola. Not long afterwards, Aunt May, Agent Venom, and Iron Spider learn Spider-Man's identity.

=== Season 4: vs. the Sinister 6 (2016–2017) ===
In the fourth season, Doctor Octopus allies with Zola and Hydra and forms a new iteration of the Sinister Six consisting of Kraven the Hunter, Ultimate Green Goblin, Rhino, Hydro-Man, and Electro. In response, Spider-Man forms a team consisting of Agent Venom, Iron Spider, Miles Morales, and Scarlet Spider (Ben Reilly). It is later revealed that Ben is a clone of Spider-Man created by Doctor Octopus, but Spider-Man convinces him to reform.

Later, Crossbones and Morbius experiment with Venom, turning New York's citizens into Carnage-like monsters. Carnage possesses Mary Jane Watson, but Spider-Man and Harry Osborn free her. Unbeknownst to Spider-Man, a fragment of the Carnage symbiote remains inside Mary Jane's body.

Madame Web learns that the destruction of the Siege Perilous shattered the barrier between universes. Spider-Man and Miles Morales travel to alternate realities to collect the fragments of the Siege Perilous and battle Wolf Spider, who seeks to reassemble the Siege Perilous to conquer the multiverse. After reassembling the Siege Perilous, Miles moves to the main universe and lets his version of Gwen Stacy replace him.

Spider-Man and Mary Jane later discover a second clone of Spider-Man named Kaine, who tries to feed off them. During this time, Mary Jane learns to control Carnage and becomes Spider-Woman. It is discovered that Doctor Octopus and Arnim Zola created Scarlet Spider as part of Weapon S, a project to create synthezoid Spider-Slayers. Kaine fuses with the synthezoids to become the Ultimate Spider-Slayer, but is defeated by Agent Venom.

In the series finale, the Sinister Six capture Spider-Man and use an antidote to remove his powers. After working with Norman Osborn, Peter regains his powers and defeats the Sinister Six. Spider-Man convinces Doctor Octopus to surrender, after which he and the S.H.I.E.L.D. trainees graduate.

== Episodes ==
Season	Title	Episodes	Originally released	
Season	Title	Episodes	First released	Last released
1	–	26	April 1, 2012	October 28, 2012
2	–	26	January 21, 2013	November 21, 2013
3	Web-Warriors	26	March 13, 2014	October 24, 2015
4	vs. the Sinister 6	26	February 21, 2016	January 7, 2017

=== Appearances in other series ===
The Ultimate Spider-Man incarnation of Spider-Man makes guest appearances in Avengers Assemble, Hulk and the Agents of S.M.A.S.H., and the Phineas and Ferb episode "Phineas and Ferb: Mission Marvel".

== Voice cast ==
- Drake Bell – Peter Parker/Spider-Man, Swarm (in "Sandman Returns"), Kaine, Spider-Slayer Synthezoids
- Dee Bradley Baker – Curt Connors/Lizard, Sandman, Carnage, Venom (season 3), Wendigo, Zzzax
- Ogie Banks – Luke Cage/Power Man, Miles Morales/Kid Arachnid
- Eric Bauza – Amadeus Cho/Iron Spider, Swarm (in "Swarm"), Arcade, Scorpion
- Greg Cipes – Danny Rand/Iron Fist
- Clark Gregg – Phil Coulson
- Tom Kenny – Doctor Octopus, Wizard, Curt Connors (season 1), Vulture, Whirlwind, Aries Soldier, Octobot, Merlin
- Matt Lanter – Harry Osborn, Flash Thompson/Agent Venom, Klaw, Venom (main hosts)
- Misty Lee – Aunt May Parker, Squirrel Girl, Salem's Witch
- Caitlyn Taylor Love – Ava Ayala/White Tiger
- Chi McBride – Nick Fury, Taurus Soldier, Thunderball
- Logan Miller – Sam Alexander/Nova, young Flash Thompson
- Scott Porter – Ben Reilly/Scarlet Spider, Scarlet Spider Synthezoids
- J. K. Simmons – J. Jonah Jameson
- Tara Strong – Mary Jane Watson, Thundra, Sandy
- Milo Ventimiglia - Spider-Man Noir
- Steven Weber – Norman Osborn, Trapster, Venom (seasons 1–2), Ultimate Green Goblin

== Production ==
The series is adapted from the Ultimate Spider-Man comic book, which was created by writer Brian Michael Bendis. Bendis and Paul Dini served as writers and producers on the show. Man of Action (a group consisting of Steven T. Seagle, Joe Kelly, Joe Casey and Duncan Rouleau), the creators of the animated series Ben 10 and Generator Rex, serve as supervising producers on the show. Twenty-six episodes were ordered for the first season. According to Paul Dini, the series features a "redefined" Peter Parker, and a combination of frequent guest stars loosely based on Bendis' comics, and original material, such as the origins of some heroes and villains. Actor J. K. Simmons reprises his role as J. Jonah Jameson from Sam Raimi's live-action Spider-Man film trilogy for the series. Notable voice actors include Adrian Pasdar as Iron Man (returning to the role after previously having voiced him in Madhouse's and Marvel's Iron Man anime), and Kevin Michael Richardson, who voices Robbie Robertson and Bulldozer.

The series depicts Spider-Man becoming the newest member of S.H.I.E.L.D. under the leadership of Nick Fury, on a team with four other teenage superheroes. Villains such as Living Laser, Venom, and Doctor Doom were seen in a trailer shown at the 2011 San Diego Comic-Con.

Ultimate Spider-Man premiered on April 1, 2012, on Disney XD in the United States, while the pilot episode was released on Xbox Live and PlayStation Store on April 2, 2012. In the UK and Ireland, the show premiered on Disney UK and Ireland on May 31, 2013. It premiered in Canada on June 22, 2012, on Teletoon.

Disney XD and Marvel officially announced Season 3 on July 20, 2013, at San Diego Comic-Con. Season 3, retitled Ultimate Spider-Man: Web-Warriors, includes Spider-Man joining the Avengers (consisting of the line-up from Avengers Assemble) and introducing characters such as Cloak and Dagger, Amadeus Cho, Ka-Zar, and Agent Venom.

A fourth season, Ultimate Spider-Man vs. the Sinister 6, began broadcasting on February 21, 2016.

=== Promotions and tie-ins ===
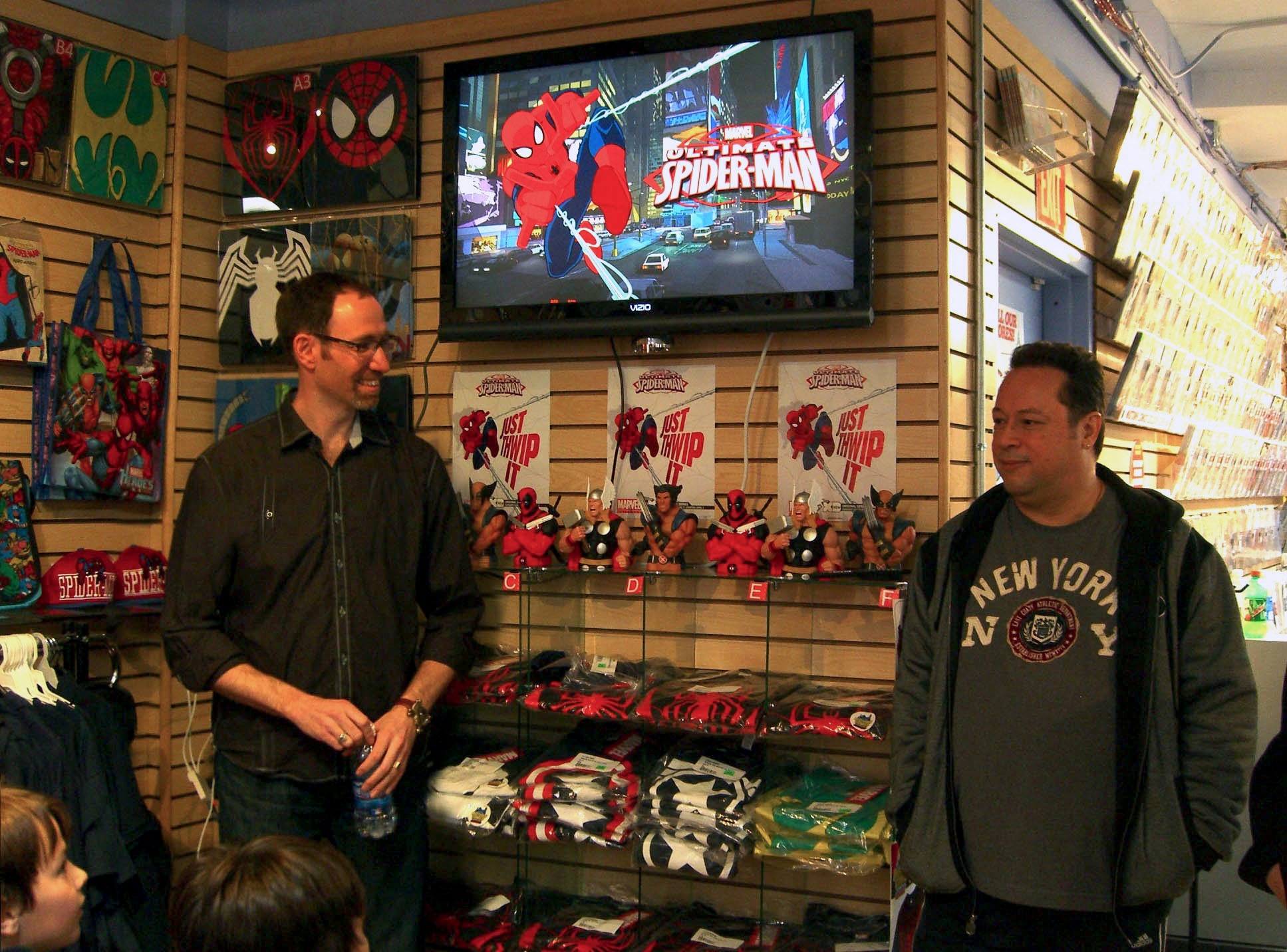
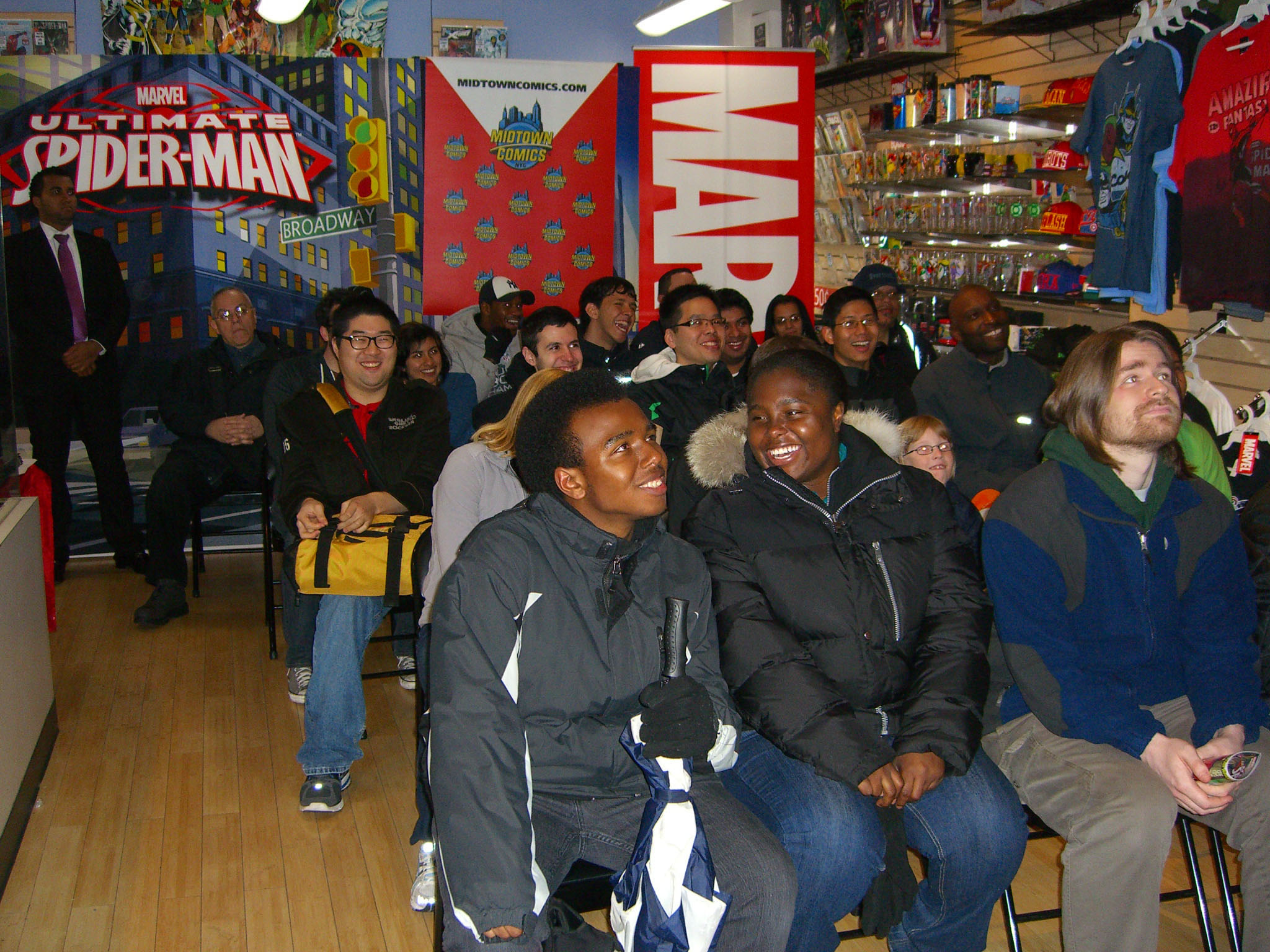
Writer/producer Joe Kelly (left) and Marvel Chief Creative Officer Joe Quesada (right) prepare a March 31, 2012 sneak preview of Part 1 of the series pilot for fans at Midtown Comics in Manhattan, the day before the series' broadcast TV debut. At right, an audience watches the episode.

Launch parties for the series were held in New York City and Los Angeles on March 31, 2012, the day before the series' broadcast television debut. On hand at the New York City party at Midtown Comics Downtown in Manhattan were Marvel creative officer Joe Quesada, writer/producer Joe Kelly and Chris Eliopoulos, who wrote the first issue of the tie-in comic book, while the Los Angeles party at Meltdown Comics in Hollywood was attended by Marvel Head of Television Jeph Loeb, Duncan Rouleau, Steven T. Seagle, voice actors Clark Gregg and Misty Lee, and creative consultant Paul Dini, who wrote the series pilot.

A comic book series that ties in with the show called Ultimate Spider-Man Adventures debuted on April 25, 2012. Ultimate Spider-Man Adventures is an ongoing series and is being released alongside The Avengers: Earth's Mightiest Heroes Adventures. The comics was written by Dan Slott and Ty Templeton, while Nuno Plati provided artwork. In 2015, Marvel began releasing a series of free digital comics simply called Ultimate Spider-Man, which can be read on the "Marvel Kids" website.

Additionally, the U.K branch of Panini Comics released eleven issues in their Ultimate Spider-Man Magazine! that tied into the third season, Ultimate Spider-Man: Web-Warriors.

In the 2014 comic book crossover storyline, "Spider-Verse", the version of Spider-Man from the cartoon teams up with the comics version of Spider-Man of Earth-616 in recruiting a Spider-Man Army to fight the Inheritors.

=== Crew ===
- Brian Michael Bendis – Writer, producer
- Dana Booton – Supervising producer
- Dan Buckley – Executive producer
- Joe Casey – Writer, supervising producer
- Paul Dini – Writer, producer, creative consultant
- Alan Fine – Executive producer
- Henry Gilroy – Supervising producer
- Joe Kelly – Writer, supervising producer
- Cort Lane – Executive producer, supervising producer
- Stan Lee – Executive producer
- Jeph Loeb – Executive producer
- Leanne Moreau – Line producer
- Joe Quesada – Executive producer
- Eric Radomski – Executive producer
- Duncan Rouleau – Writer, supervising producer
- Steven T. Seagle – Writer, supervising producer
- Eugene Son – Story editor
- Alex Soto – Supervising director
- Collette Sunderman – Casting and voice director
- Harrison Wilcox – Associate producer

== Reception ==
=== Critical reception ===
The series received mixed reviews. Brian Lowry of Variety criticized the series, suggesting that the source material was "strained through the juvenile, rapid-fire-joke filter of Family Guy", and called the show a "high-profile misfire" that didn't "bode well for Marvel's efforts to straddle the line of catering to kids without dumbing down venerable properties that plenty of adults know and love."

David Sims of The A.V. Club gave the pilot a "C" ranking, writing that the first episode "feels rather lame and perfunctory, with wackiness dialed up to 11 in an effort to distract from how fundamentally bland it is." Sim subsequently gave a "C+" to the episode "Doomed" and a "B+" to the episode "Back in Black". Oliver Sava, also of The A.V. Club, gave the episode "Venom" a "B", stating that the title of the show should be changed to Synergy Spider-Man, because it goes beyond movie and Ultimate continuity to create an entry point for young viewers into the main line of Marvel titles. Sava subsequently gave the episode "Field Trip" an "A−".

Emily Ashby of Common Sense Media gave the show a 4 out of 5 stars, noting the abundance of action and humor afforded by the series' premise, and opining that the lessons that Parker learns about growth and responsibility under the guidance of his mentor and friends would at least make lasting impressions on young viewers.

=== Awards and nominations ===
Year	Award	Category	Nominee	Result
2013	Behind the Voice Actors Awards	Best Male Vocal Performance in a Television Series in a Supporting Role – Action/Drama	Tom Kenny (Doctor Octopus)	Nominated
2013	Behind the Voice Actors Awards	Best Female Vocal Performance in a Television Series in a Supporting Role – Action/Drama	Tara Strong (Mary Jane Watson)	Nominated
2014	Behind the Voice Actors Awards	Best Female Lead Vocal Performance in a Television Series – Action/Drama	Caitlyn Taylor Love (White Tiger)	Nominated
2015	Behind the Voice Actors Awards	Best Male Vocal Performance in a Television Series in a Supporting Role – Action/Drama	Tom Kenny (Vulture)	Nominated
2015	Behind the Voice Actors Awards	Best Female Vocal Performance in a Television Series in a Supporting Role – Action/Drama	Ashley Eckstein (Dagger)	Nominated
2015	Behind the Voice Actors Awards	Best Male Vocal Performance in a Television Series in a Guest Role – Action/Drama	JB Blanc (Titus)	Nominated
2015	Motion Picture Sound Editors, USA	Best Sound Editing – Sound Effects, Foley, Dialogue and ADR Animation in Television	Mike Draghi (supervising sound editor), Greg Rubin (sound designer), Marcos Abrom (sound designer), Maciek Malish (supervising foley editor), John Brengman (supervising dialogue editor, supervising adr editor), Maciek Krakówka (foley artist), Tomasz Dukszta (foley artist), Jesse Aruda (sound effects editor) (for the episode "The Spider-Verse: Part 1")	Nominated
2016	Behind the Voice Actors Awards	Best Female Vocal Performance in a Television Series in a Supporting Role – Action/Drama	Olivia Holt (Spider-Girl)	Nominated
2016	Motion Picture Sound Editors, USA	Best Sound Editing – Sound Effects, Foley, Dialogue and ADR Animation in Television	Mike Draghi (supervising sound editor), John Brengman (supervising dialogue editor), Maciek Malish (supervising foley editor), Jesse Aruda (sound designer), Marcos Abrom (sound designer), Maciek Krakówka (foley artist), Michael Emter (sound effects editor), Dan Negovan (music editor) (for the episode "Contest of Champions: Part 4")	Nominated

== Adaptations ==
- Marvel Universe Ultimate Spider-Man: Adaptation of first 2 seasons.
- Marvel Universe Ultimate Spider-Man: Web-Warriors: Adaptation of 3rd season.
- Ultimate Spider-Man: Web-Warriors: Spider-Verse: Adaptation of 3rd season.
- Marvel Universe Ultimate Spider-Man Vs. the Sinister 6: Adaptation of 4th season.
- Marvel Universe Ultimate Spider-Man: Web-Warriors: Spider-Verse: Adaptation of 3rd season (Infinite Comics version of Ultimate Spider-Man: Web-Warriors: Spider-Verse).
- Ultimate Spider-Man Infinite Comic: Adaptation of first 2 seasons.
- Ultimate Spider-Man Magazine: It is a series of magazines with reprinted stories from Marvel Universe Ultimate Spider-Man, puzzles, games, and a pull-out poster. 6 numbered issues were published by Redan Publishing, Inc. in 2015.

=== English version by Marvel ===
- Marvel Universe Ultimate Spider-Man: Web-Warriors: Spider-Verse (ISBN 978-0-7851-9442-2, 2016-03-29/2016-04-13): Includes Marvel Universe Ultimate Spider-Man: Spider-Verse #13-16.
