= Infinity Countdown =

Marvel Comics storyline

- Publisher: Marvel Comics
- Publication date: February 2018
- Main character(s): Adam Warlock; Black Widow's clone Captain Marvel; Daredevil; Guardians of the Galaxy; Loki; Super-Skrull; Turk Barrett; Ultron; Wolverine

Creative team
- Writer: Gerry Duggan
- Penciller: Aaron Kuder

"Infinity Countdown" is a 2018 comic book storyline published by Marvel Comics. The storyline leads into the "Infinity Wars" storyline.

== Premise ==
The story depicts Ultron going after the Infinity Gems, which were recreated when the multiverse was restored.

== Plot ==
=== Prologue ===
Back during the "Time Runs Out" storyline, the Infinity Gems were destroyed during the Incursion that affected the Multiverse. When the Multiverse is restored by Mister Fantastic, it enabled the Infinity Gems to be restored. The Space Gem is found by Wolverine, the Mind Gem by Turk Barrett, the Power Gem by the Guardians of the Galaxy, the Reality Gem by Captain Marvel, and the Time Gem by Super-Skrull.

=== Main plot ===
Gardener and his army of Flora Colossi are attacking Telferina. The Guardians of the Galaxy intercept the army of Flora Colossi while Groot cures Gardener of a poison that Loki had infected him with. After being healed, Gardener gives Groot the ability to speak in full sentences. Meanwhile, Warbringer led the Chitauri fleet to the planet Xitaung in order to claim the Power Gem. In Madripoor, Black Widow traces a dead drop signal left by Wolverine, finding that Wolverine secretly left the Space Gem in her care.

The Guardians of the Galaxy managed to defeat Scar and join the Nova Corps in their fight against the Fraternity of Raptors and the Chitauri on Xituang. Meanwhile, Adam Warlock starts looking for the Soul Gem, which brings him to the planet Saiph. Upon arriving, he finds that the planet has been conquered by Ultron, with Silver Surfer having been infected.

Star-Lord shrinks the Power Gem to the size of his hand. However, Xituang begins to collapse without the Power Gem acting as an anchor. The Guardians of the Galaxy and the Nova Corps use the Power Gem to destroy the Chitauri fleet as they escape Xituang. Meanwhile, Adam Warlock heals Silver Surfer of the Ultron virus. Silver Surfer informs Galactus of what is happening and asks for his help to stop Ultron's plot. However, Ultron has already launched rockets filled with the Ultron virus to infect the entire galaxy.

Galactus initially refuses to consume Saiph due to the consequences of destroying it until he agrees with Silver Surfer. This results in Saiph and the rockets that were transporting the Ultron virus being destroyed. Ultron is wounded in the escape and Adam Warlock claims the Soul Gem. After the Guardians of the Galaxy and the Nova Corps regroup on Knowhere, Drax the Destroyer makes off with the Power Gem while Nova plans to rescue his brother from the Fraternity of Raptors. Star-Lord is summoned by Collector and Grandmaster who have a version of the Reality Gem from another reality. An alternate version of Phyla-Vell appears to retrieve it. Star-Lord gives the Reality Gem to her without a fight since it will not work outside her reality.

As the Guardians of the Galaxy escape to Oblitus, they are intercepted by Adam Warlock and Kang the Conqueror. Gamora attempts to take the Soul Gem from Warlock. When Drax the Destroyer grabs the Soul Gem, he discovers that the Soul World inside is corrupted. Drax knocks out Gamora and makes off with Warlock and Kang. Doctor Strange tracks down the Mind Gem and finds it in Turk Barrett's possession as Barrett manages to evade him. When Black Widow arrives seeking out Strange, intending to dispose of the Space Gem, Strange refuses to take it, knowing what would happen the Gems are in the same proximity. Strange speaks to the holders of the Infinity Gems and requests that they reform the Infinity Watch.

== Issues involved ==
=== Main plot ===
- Infinity Countdown #1-5

=== Tie-ins ===
- Infinity Countdown: Adam Warlock #1
- Infinity Countdown: Black Widow #1
- Infinity Countdown: Captain Marvel #1
- Infinity Countdown: Champions #1-2
- Infinity Countdown: Daredevil #1
- Infinity Countdown: Darkhawk #1-4
- Infinity Countdown: Prime #1

=== Involved but not listed under the "Infinity Countdown" banner ===
- Doctor Strange #1-3

== Sequel ==
A sequel series titled Infinity Wars was released in 2018.

== Collected editions ==
Title	Material collected	Date published	ISBN
Infinity Countdown	Infinity Countdown Prime #1, Infinity Countdown #1-5, Infinity Countdown: Adam Warlock #1	September 2018	978-1302913557
Infinity Countdown Companion	Infinity Countdown: Black Widow, Infinity Countdown: Captain Marvel, Infinity Countdown: Daredevil, Infinity Countdown: Darkhawk #1-4, Infinity Countdown: Champions #1-2	September 2018	978-1302913090
Infinity Countdown: Darkhawk	Infinity Countdown: Darkhawk #1-4, Darkhawk #51	October 2018	978-1302914936
Infinity Wars by Gerry Duggan: The Complete Collection	Infinity Countdown Prime #1, Infinity Countdown #1-5, Infinity Countdown: Adam Warlock #1, Infinity Wars Prime #1, Infinity Wars #1-6, Infinity Wars: Fallen Guardian #1, Infinity Wars: Infinity #1, material from Thanos Legacy #1, Free Comic Book Day 2018 Amazing Spider-Man/Guardians of the Galaxy	October 2019	978-1302914967
