= Infinity Wars =

2018 Marvel Comics storyline, a follow-up to the Infinity Countdown storyline

- Publisher: Marvel Comics
- Publication date: July 2018
- Main character(s): Devondra; Infinity Watch; Loki; Requiem; Sleepwalker

Creative team
- Writer: Gerry Duggan
- Artist(s): Mike Deodato; Frank Martin
- Penciller: Mike Deodato
- Inker: Mike Deodato
- Letterer: Cory Petit
- Colorist: Frank Martin
- Editor(s): Jordan D. White; Annalise Bissa

"Infinity Wars" is a 2018 comic book storyline published by Marvel Comics as a follow-up to "Infinity Countdown."

== Premise ==
The premise involves the heroes and villains of the Marvel Universe deal with the outcome of the search for the new Infinity Gems (now renamed Infinity Stones).

In Infinity Wars #3 ("Infinity Warps"), Requiem (Gamora) successfully gathers the Infinity Stones to use them in a more creative fashion than her father Thanos, reducing the universe's lifeforms in half by combining any two given characters into one new individual. However, the result is unintended: only the reality around the heroes of Earth is warped and transported inside Soulworld where Devondra, a cosmic entity dwelling at the heart of the Soul Stone, waits to feed.

== Plot ==
Adam Warlock senses the corruption of Soul World and enlists Doctor Strange to help. Strange, who has the Time Stone, tries to get Warlock to give up the Soul Stone. Before leaving, Warlock warns Strange that Kang the Conqueror is not the only one looking for the Infinity Stones. On Chitauri Prime, Thanos prepares to rally the Chitauri to find the Infinity Stones, but a shadowy figure appears behind Thanos and kills him.

Gamora approaches Star-Lord, Rocket Raccoon, and Groot at a bar at Knowhere, where Star-Lord tries to get Gamora to return to the Guardians of the Galaxy. Doctor Strange gathers the other wielders of the Infinity Stones in Central Park, where they discover that Thanos is dead. The assailant who killed Thanos arrives demanding the Infinity Stones, identifying herself as Requiem. Rocket shoots off Requiem's mask, revealing her to be Gamora.

To feed Devondra, Gamora traps the Soul World's inhabitants in a pocket dimension called Warp World. This pocket dimension merges many established pairs of characters into one individual. Gamora travels with Flowa to the God's Quarry and begins to dig into the Quarry of Creation. It is revealed that Gamora has trapped Loki in the Soul Stone, where he tries to enlist a hybrid of Wolverine and Emma Frost called Diamond Patch to find Adam Warlock and prevent the end of the world and Warp World.

As Loki's group traverses through the wastelands, they find a younger Gamora playing with stones. Emma Frost and Ms. Marvel talk to Gamora and learn that she is in a safe place and does not want her to leave. Gamora is persuaded to give up the Infinity Stones, which are divided among the heroes: Frost gets the Power Stone, Hulk gets the Space Stone, Ant-Man gets the Time Stone, Kang the Conqueror gets the Reality Stone, Loki gets the Soul Stone, and Ms. Marvel gets the Mind Stone. As she fights Kang's army, Gamora claims that she will remake the universe once Devondra is done devouring the old one so that there will be no suffering. Influenced by Loki's own agenda, Ant-Man steals the Reality and Space Stones, while Loki grabs some rocks on the ground and starts replacing the reclaimed Infinity Stones.

In the other universe, Loki is shown his future by the Celestials. Disenchanted by what he sees, Loki gives the Stones back to his former teammates and leaves with Flowa for Omnipotence City. Back in Soul World, Soldier Supreme defeats Gamora and demands information on how to defeat Devondra. Gamora states that there is no defeating Devondra and that the universe will be in entropy without the Infinity Stones. Adam Warlock plans to copy the souls in Warp World in order to bring them and Devondra into the real world as Hulk punches Devondra into the hole leading to the real world. The Infinity Stones bore through the dimensions until Devondra's universe collapses. Star-Lord notices that Gamora is gone as Warlock sent her to a location so that she can redeem herself. Warp World is preserved, allowing Arthur Douglas and Warp World's residents to be preserved. In a desert somewhere, Gamora finds a cocoon and tears it open to find a younger version of Magus inside as she has a brief vision of Thanos. In a desert somewhere, Warlock stares at the stars and draws a symbol in the sand claiming that a part of him is missing, echoing the beginning of Gamora's journey to become Requiem in the first place.

== Issues ==
=== Main plot ===
- Infinity Wars #1-6

=== Tie-ins ===
- Asgardians of the Galaxy #1-5
- Doctor Strange Vol. 5 #3
- Infinity Wars Prime #1
- Infinity Wars: Fallen Guardian #1
- Infinity Wars: Infinity #1
- Infinity Wars: Sleepwalker #1-4

=== Involved but not listed as tie-ins ===
- Thanos Legacy #1
- Avengers (2018) #10
- Venom (2018) #8

=== Infinity Warps ===
- Infinity Warps: Arachknight #1-2
- Infinity Warps: Ghost Panther #1-2
- Infinity Warps: Infinity Warps #1-2
- Infinity Warps: Iron Hammer #1-2
- Infinity Warps: Soldier Supreme #1-2
- Infinity Warps: Weapon Hex #1-2

=== Aftermath ===
- Wolverine: Infinity Watch #1-5

=== Secret Warps ===
- Secret Warps: Soldier Supreme Annual #1
- Secret Warps: Weapon Hex Annual #1
- Secret Warps: Ghost Panther Annual #1
- Secret Warps: Arachknight Annual #1
- Secret Warps: Iron Hammer Annual #1

== Collected editions ==
Title	Material collected	Publication date	ISBN
Infinity Wars	Infinity Wars Prime #1,Infinity Wars #1–6, and material from Free Comic Book Day Amazing Spider-Man/Guardians of the Galaxy 2018	February 2019	978-1302913564
Infinity Warps: Two-In-One	Infinity Wars: Soldier Supreme #1-2, Infinity Wars: Iron Hammer #1-2, Infinity Wars: Arachknight #1-2, Infinity Wars: Weapon Hex #1-2, Infinity Wars: Ghost Panther #1-2 and Infinity Wars: Infinity Warps #1-2	February 2019	978-1302914707
Infinity Wars: Sleepwalker	Infinity Wars: Sleepwalker #1-4, Sleepwalker #1	March 2019	978-1302915841
Infinity Wars by Gerry Duggan: The Complete Collection	Infinity Countdown Prime #1, Infinity Countdown #1-5, Infinity Countdown: Adam Warlock #1, Infinity Wars Prime #1, Infinity Wars 1-6, Infinity Wars: Fallen Guardian #1, Infinity Wars: Infinity #1, and material from Free Comic Book Day Amazing Spider-Man/Guardians of the Galaxy 2018, Thanos Legacy #1	October 2019	978-1302914967
Secret Warps	Secret Warps: Soldier Supreme Annual #1, Secret Warps: Weapon Hex Annual #1, Secret Warps: Ghost Panther Annual #1, Secret Warps: Arachknight Annual #1, Secret Warps: Iron Hammer Annual #1	October 2019	978-1302917760
Wolverine: Infinity Watch	Wolverine: Infinity Watch #1-5	September 2019	978-1302915810
