= Sleepwalker (character) =

Fictional character appearing in American comic books published by Marvel Comics

- Sleepwalker as depicted in Marvel Team-Up (vol. 3) #9 (August 2005). Art by Scott Kolins.

Publication information
- Publisher: Marvel Comics
- First appearance: Sleepwalker #1 (June 1991)
- Created by: Bob Budiansky and Bret Blevins

In-story information
- Team affiliations: S.H.I.E.L.D. Secret Defenders; Sleepwalkers; Mindscape; Operation: Lightning Storm
- Notable aliases: Sleepy
- Abilities: Superhuman strength, durability and visual acuity Enhanced speed, agility, stamina and reflexes Flotation-like flight Substance altering eyebeams Immunity to sleep Resistance to mental attacks Use of Imaginator device Infinity circuit enhancement

Sleepwalker is a fictional character appearing in American comic books published by Marvel Comics. Created by Bob Budiansky and Bret Blevins, he first appeared in Sleepwalker #1 (June 1991). The character is named after his race and is the star of a self-titled comic book which ran for 33 issues, from June 1991 to February 1994, with one Holiday Special. All but two of the issues were written by Budiansky, with Tom Brevoort and Mike Kanterovich writing the Holiday Special and one fill-in issue. Dan Slott also contributed a humorous side story in issue #25.

== Creation ==
Bob Budiansky spoke on the creation of the character saying,

The idea what would become Sleepwalker first sparked within me during one of the weekly editorial meetings I attended when I was a Marvel editor and which were chaired by former Marvel Editor-in-Chief Jim Shooter... Among the things talked about was how, in the real world, Superman would be treated by the nations of earth if he actually existed. He said that rather than being welcomed by most nations of the earth as a hero because of his good deeds and good looks, nations would instead unite to figure out how to defend themselves against and, if necessary, defeat this near-omnipotent alien being... And so the thought occurred to me that simply because Superman happens to look like the stereotypical all-American male of that era, people have no hesitation to accept him as the hero he is despite the fact that it's common knowledge he's an alien. But what if he is still heroic and looks like a true alien - a creature that doesn't look like us, and, in fact, appears repellant to us? How would humans react to him if that's how Superman looks? So Sleepwalker began as the anti-Superman, instead of an alien who just happens to look like the perfect human. I made him an alien who is a green-skinned bug-eyed monster, at least to our eyes. And he's heroic. At first, I wanted to name my character Alien. But the more I thought about it, the more I realized that Alien was a poor choice because it had already been used for the 1979 movie of the same name, which is probably the reason others mistakenly think I came up with the [Sleepwalker] idea in the 1970s". In regard to his idea of the concept of Sleepwalker, Budiansky stated "I came up with the name Sleepwalker and tied his origin and abilities to dreams, which was an interest of mine. Instead of coming from an alien planet, like Superman, Sleepwalker would come from an alien dimension. I began writing the backstory for Sleepwalker and sketching out his look probably around 1989.

== Publication history ==
A second Sleepwalker character was planned to receive a self-titled series by Robert Kirkman in 2004, but instead debuted in the 2004 Epic Anthology, which was cancelled after one issue. The original Sleepwalker's next appearance was in Marvel Team-Up vol. 3 #15, nearly a decade after his original cancellation.

At the end of 2018, a four-issue Sleepwalker miniseries was released as a tie-in to the Infinity Wars event. The series is written by Chad Bowers and Chris Sims, with artwork by Todd Nauck.

In 2017, Rich Johnston of Bleeding Cool addressed persistent rumors that Marvel editor-in-chief Tom DeFalco had described Sleepwalker as "Sandman done right". After researching the phrase, the most Johnston was able to find was "mention of a press release that described [Sleepwalker] as 'Sandman done the Marvel way;'" however, this was "only a reference, never an actual quoted piece". Johnston posited that the rumor's source may have been a parody of earlier Marvel editor-in-chief Jim Shooter.

== Fictional character biography ==
The Mindscape is a dimension that borders on the minds of all intelligent beings and living things, inhabited by many strange creatures. Some of them are very dangerous, seeking to invade the sleeping minds of humans. The Sleepwalkers act as guardians to defend these minds and the Mindscape, apprehending the creatures. One such Sleepwalker was trapped in the mind of New York college student Rick Sheridan after being tricked by his archenemy Cobweb. When Rick sleeps, Sleepwalker can materialize in reality or remain in Rick's mind and converse with him via his dreams. After he is informed that Sleepwalker is not malicious, Rick comes to an understanding with him, allowing Sleepwalker to battle crime at night.

Sleepwalker is one of the few entities who remember the events of The Infinity Gauntlet storyline, during which he battled the villainous Chain Gang and rescued people from natural disasters. However, Nebula turns back time, neutralizing what he had gone through. He considers his vague memories to be just a dream.

Sleepwalker plays an important role in the Infinity War, helping to defeat the Magus by channeling mental powers from Professor X, Jean Grey, Psylocke, and Moondragon through Rick Sheridan's mind. He also contributes to the battle against the evil clones of the superheroes Beast, Firestar, and Daredevil. Part of the fight against the evil doubles involved Sleepwalker impersonating his own evil clone.

In the "Infinity Crusade" storyline, Sleepwalker is brainwashed by the Goddess and taken to her version of Counter-Earth. During the battle between the Goddess's forces and the rest of Earth's heroes, Sleepwalker subdues Darkhawk and the Human Torch by dragging them into the water with his shape-changing powers.

Sleepwalker is revealed to supposedly be the lead scout for the Mindspawn, an invading force from the Mindscape. However, in actuality, Cobweb had put in motion a complicated plot to invade Earth and disrupt Rick's relationship with Sleepwalker. This involves disguising his minions as members of Sleepwalker's race and framing his archenemy as their leader. The plot is only partially successful; Sleepwalker and the Avengers thwart the initial attack, although Sleepwalker's reputation is ruined in the process.

During the confrontation, Sleepwalker destroys Rick's mind as a means of protecting him from Cobweb's minions. Unfortunately, the authorities retrieve the "mindrake" weapon Sleepwalker had used to store Rick's mind, preventing him from recovering it, while gathering up one of Cobweb's demons that was left behind after the Avengers drove them away. The demon and the mindrake are taken to a federal prison and research facility, where serial killer Jeremy Roscoe is being held as part of a psychiatric experiment. Roscoe escapes from prison and fuses with the demon, transforming into a creature called Psyko. Psyko begins spreading mass insanity across New York until Sleepwalker manages to defeat him and retrieve the mindrake Psyko had taken with him.

Later, Sleepwalker thwarts Cobweb's second attack and banishes his archenemy once and for all, before seemingly dying to save Rick Sheridan's life. Sleepwalker later turns up alive, still trapped in Rick's mind.

Sleepwalker is seen as having become a registered superhuman under the Initiative. He then appears alongside Machine Man and Agent Sum as a member of Ms. Marvel's Operation: Lightning Storm.

During the Fantastic Four's confrontation with the Quiet Man, they recruit Sleepwalker to neutralize the threat posed by the heroes from Counter-Earth. They reason that Sleepwalker is particularly suited to advise them on it, since Counter-Earth was Franklin Richards' dream.

Sleepwalker has made few appearances in modern comics. He received a self-titled miniseries that was a tie-in to the Infinity Wars event, and has had supporting roles in Moon Girl And Devil Dinosaur and Hellcat. In Infinity Wars, Rick Sheridan is one of countless individuals who are caught in Gamora's plan to appease the entity Devondra, causing him to be fused with an unspecified individual. After journeying into the Soul Gem to retrieve Rick, Sleepwalker learns that Rick has been fused with Nick Fury. Fury attempts to hunt Sleepwalker down, but Sleepwalker uses his warp gaze to separate Rick and Fury.

== Powers and abilities ==
Sleepwalker possesses superhuman strength, durability, and the ability to levitate. His only offensive power is his "warp gaze", which allows him to alter the shape of physical objects within his line of sight and twist them to his purposes. He can also modify the physical characteristics of the objects he affects, making them harder or softer, for example. Owing to an oath sworn by all members of his race due to the great physical and mental pain it could cause, Sleepwalker usually avoids using his warp beams on living entities.

As an alien resident of the Mindscape, Sleepwalker has exceptional visual abilities, being able to see over a much farther distance than an average human, as well as being able to see and follow energy trails, and see wavelength colors invisible to human eyes. His training as a warrior of the Mindscape makes him skilled tracker and an expert in the combat use of his powers, and also gives him a certain amount of knowledge about various supernatural entities and the workings of the mind. Sleepwalker's presence strengthens the powers of psychic powers and mind-related magic, enhancing the mental abilities of Professor X, Moondragon, Jean Grey and Psylocke. Similarly, Sleepwalker's mere presence increased the power of Doctor Strange's mental spells and enabled him to imprison a mental demon released from a woman's mind by Nightmare. Continuing his supernatural 'expertise', Sleepwalker's nature also allows him to be aware of souls, allowing him to confirm that the natives of Counter-Earth did not have souls as they were nothing more than psychic manifestations created by Franklin Richards; he was also able to confirm that Jim Hammond had a soul despite his artificial origin.

Sleepwalker has several weaknesses. The first is his bond to Rick Sheridan—whenever Rick awakens, Sleepwalker automatically disappears from the physical plane and returns to Rick's mind. In the Infinity Wars storyline, Rick is shown to have mastered a form of meditation that allows him to summon Sleepwalker while he is awake.

Sleepwalker's strength is related to his connection with the ground and the Earth—he is strongest while directly in contact with the ground and weakens the higher he floats off the ground. Similarly, Sleepwalker is weakened if he does not return to the mental plane or Rick's mind to renew his energy.

Sleepwalker used the Imaginator, an amulet-like device that can teleport himself and others, before it was stolen by Cobweb. After recovering the Imaginator, Sleepwalker was forced to use it to exile him far from Earth.

In Infinity Wars, Sleepwalker discovers that he can harness the power of the Infinity Gems without having to use them directly, as the Mindscape is connected to the Mind Gem.

== Enemies ==
Sleepwalker possessed a colorful gallery of mostly original villains, with a new one introduced each issue during the title's beginnings. They include:

- Jeff Hagees / 8-Ball: A criminal who based his costume and equipment on the game of pool.
- Nelson Gruber / Bookworm: An angry social misfit who, after an encounter with Sleepwalker, gained the ability to channel energy from the Mindscape into creations of whatever he read. He used his abilities to get revenge on his tormentors.
- Chain Gang: Four convicted felons linked together in a chain gang who escaped during the upheavals caused by the Infinity Gauntlet, gaining superhuman powers that lasted only as long as they stayed chained together. It consists of Master Link (Willis Hayworth), Missing Link (Ray Morgan), Uplink (Hector Fuentes), and Weak Link (Ernest Mills).
- Mr. FX: A mysterious special effects designer who was known for his stunningly lifelike displays, which he achieved by kidnapping people and imprisoning them within specially designed costumes.
- Nightmare: Sleepwalker faced off against this living embodiment of bad dreams, usually a Doctor Strange villain. Nightmare promised the reward of sending Sleepwalker back to his home realm, but Sleepwalker fought back when Nightmare threatened Rick Sheridan.
- Selena Slate / Spectra: The assistant of a scientist who was studying the properties of a strange diamond, and planned to steal it and split the proceeds with her junkie boyfriend. After being imbued with the diamond's powers, she gained the ability to manipulate multicolored lights with various effects.
- Mr. Jyn: A demonic genie who tricked humans into letting him manifest on Earth by pretending to serve them, even as he manipulated them into letting him cause mayhem until he would be released.
- Edward "Eddie" Cicala: A young boy traumatized by his father murdering his mother, who became catatonic before his mind made contact with a malign energy force from the Mindscape, which allowed him to possess others.
- Cobweb: Sleepwalker's nemesis, a demon of the Mindscape who can cause madness in others. Cobweb trapped Sleepwalker in Rick Sheridan's mind as part of a plot to invade Earth without being thwarted by his enemy.
- Felicity Hopkins / Lullaby: A teenage mutant who can place others in zombie-like trances through song.
- Carl Wilkinson / Crimewave: A crime boss who plotted to embarrass the Kingpin and replace him as the top crime lord on the East Coast, by capturing Spider-Man.
- Thought Police: A special team of government agents assembled to capture Sleepwalker, led by the obsessed Agent Tolliver Smith.
- Jeremy Roscoe / Psyko: A human serial killer who became fused with a monster from the Mindscape and transformed into a hideous creature with warping powers similar to Sleepwalker's and the additional power to cause insanity.

== Other versions ==
=== Marvel Team-Up: League of Losers ===
An alternate universe version of Sleepwalker appears in Marvel Team-Up (vol. 3) as a member of the "League of Losers" alongside Darkhawk, Dagger, Araña, X-23, Gravity, and Terror.

=== Marvel Zombies: Dead Days ===
An alternate universe version of Sleepwalker from Earth-2149 makes a cameo appearance in Marvel Zombies: Dead Days.

=== Ultimate Sleepwalker ===
An alternate universe version of the Sleepwalkers from Earth-1610 appear in Ultimate X-Men #89.

== In other media ==
- Sleepwalker appears in Marvel Mystic Mayhem.
- Sleepwalker appears in The Avengers: Earth's Mightiest Heroes #11.

== Collected editions ==
Title	Material collected	Published date	ISBN
Infinity Wars: Sleepwalker	Infinity Wars: Sleepwalker #1-4, Sleepwalker #1	March 2019	978-1302915841
