= Soul World =

Fictional dimension appearing in Marvel Comics

Soul World is a fictional place appearing in American comic books published by Marvel Comics, and created by writer/illustrator Jim Starlin. Soul World was first alluded to in Strange Tales #179 (1975), and first appeared in Warlock Vol 2 #6 (1983). Soul World is described as a pocket dimension contained within the Soul Gem, and is depicted as an idyllic alien landscape inhabited by the souls of characters most commonly associated with Starlin's recurrent fictional protagonist, Adam Warlock. Soul World serves as a purgatory for souls "captured" by Warlock.

== Fictional depiction ==
Soul World is featured most often in the Marvel Comics cosmic-based tales Jim Starlin helped revitalize in the 1970s with the re-purposing of Adam Warlock, formerly known as Him. Warlock wields the Soul Gem, which contains a pocket universe that he can imprison others in. It is overseen by Devondra, an ancient spider-like creature who can consume souls and has the potential to remake reality using the Soul Gem's power.

In Infinity Wars, Gamora uses the Infinity Gems to fuse every individual in the universe with one another and satiate Devondra to prevent it from destroying the universe. After the Hulk kills Devondra, Warlock undoes Gamora's actions and preserves the fused individuals in a pocket universe dubbed Warp World.

== Narrative function ==
Starlin initially used Soul World in his stories to serve as a place of exile and purgatory for a supporting cast of characters most commonly affiliated with Adam Warlock. As the wielder of the Soul Gem, Warlock is the de facto god of Soul World. Starlin used Soul World as a place of self-exile for Warlock in that character's death and resurrection storyline. In The Infinity Gauntlet, Warlock uses Soul World as a place of exile for villains. Other characters, such as Judge Kray-Tor and Captain Autolycus, inhabit Soul World in a type of purgatory for souls that Warlock deems righteous.

== In other media ==
- The Soul World appears in The Avengers: Earth's Mightiest Heroes episode "Michael Korvac".
- The Soul World appears in Guardians of the Galaxy.
- A metaphysical realm that resembles, but is unrelated to, the Soul World appears in Avengers: Infinity War.
