= Infinity Watch =

Fictional comic book organizations

The Infinity Watch

Publication information
- Publisher: Marvel Comics
- First appearance: Warlock and the Infinity Watch #1 (1992)
- Created by: Jim Starlin (writer); Angel Medina (artist)

In-story information
- Base(s): Monster Island
- Member(s): Various

The Infinity Watch is the name of three fictional organizations appearing in American comic books published by Marvel Comics. The first version of Infinity Watch was gathered in Warlock and the Infinity Watch #1, and starred in that series until it ended with issue #42. The six members were the self-appointed guardians of the Infinity Gems, which were each given to a single member in order to safeguard against anyone else assembling them into the Infinity Gauntlet.

== Fictional group history ==
=== Adam Warlock's first version ===
When Adam Warlock obtains possession of the all-powerful Infinity Gauntlet (that contained the six Infinity Gems) from Thanos, he is ordered by the Living Tribunal to separate the Gems so that they may never be used in conjunction again. Warlock forms the Infinity Watch, entrusting each member with an Infinity Gem to protect and keeping the identity of the sixth member a secret even from his fellow Infinity Watch members. Under the Gauntlet's influence, Warlock is not in his right mind, and even he wondered if he had made the right choices later on.

Initially, Warlock did not intend for the Watch to become a team; he believes the gems would be safer if they were all kept separately. However, Warlock's old enemy, the Man-Beast, abducts four Infinity Watch members and manipulates their gems in an attempt to destroy Warlock. After the Man-Beast is defeated, the Infinity Watch choose to stay together as a heroic team, except for Thanos. Thanos, having undergone a period of humility after the Infinity Gauntlet affair, leaves the team while keeping his Gem.

Warlock negotiates a deal with the Mole Man to use a castle on Monster Island as the Watch's base. With help from the Avengers and Warlock, the United Nations recognize the Mole Man's sovereignty of Monster Island after a conflict with the Watch. The Infinity Watch goes on to deal with many other foes, most of them interested in the power the Gems could confer on their owner. Other opponents had personal interests in the Infinity Watch members.

An amnesic man appears on Monster Island and was taken in by the Watch despite Gamora's warnings. Gamora, holding the Time Gem, has visions of this man killing Warlock. The Watch names the man Maxam after a symbol found on his belt and he joins the Watch, despite a violent outburst against Warlock.

Gamora leaves the team after an argument with Warlock. Maxam became the new Guardian of the Time Gem. This causes his memories to return; he is under the belief that Warlock is a danger to his homeworld. Under Moondragon's telepathic influence, Maxam believes that he had broken Warlock's neck and returns to his own world. Meanwhile, the being Rune steals all the Infinity Gems and took them to the Ultraverse. With Gamora, Maxam, and the gems gone, the Watch disbands.

=== Doctor Strange's version ===
At the end of the "Infinity Countdown" storyline, Doctor Strange uses a magic spell to speak to the holders of the Infinity Gems and requested a parley to reform the Infinity Watch. He states to Adam Warlock, Black Widow, Captain Marvel, Star-Lord, and Turk Barrett that they need to safeguard them from such calamities.

=== Adam Warlock's second version ===
To prevent the Infinity Stones from being stolen, Adam Warlock gave them sentience so they can choose their own wielders. The Soul Stone created the Mergiverse, a pocket multiverse that preserves the merged reality created by Gamora. The Time Stone chose Hector Bautista / Overtime, the Reality Stone chose Ripley Ryan / Star, the Space Stone chose Quantum, the Power Stone chose Apex, the Soul Stone chose Multitude, the Mind Stone chose a human named Worldmind before he was killed by Thanos and came into the possession of Colleen Wing; and the Death Stone chose Phil Coulson.

== Team roster ==
Character	Name	Infinity Gem / Stone	Joined in
Adam Warlock		Soul Gem	Warlock and the Infinity Watch #2 (March 1992)
Drax the Destroyer	Arthur Sampson Douglas	Power Gem	Warlock and the Infinity Watch #2 (March 1992)
Gamora		Time Gem	Warlock and the Infinity Watch #2 (March 1992)
Moondragon	Heather Douglas	Mind Gem	Warlock and the Infinity Watch #2 (March 1992)
Pip the Troll	Pip Gofern	Space Gem	Warlock and the Infinity Watch #2 (March 1992)
Maxam		Time Gem	Warlock and the Infinity Watch #12 (January 1993)
Thanos		Reality Gem	Warlock Chronicles #2 (August 1993)
Black Widow	Natasha Romanoff (born Natalia Alianovna Romanova)	Space Stone	Infinity Countdown #5 (July 2018)
Captain Marvel	Carol Susan Jane Danvers	Reality Stone	Infinity Countdown #5 (July 2018)
Doctor Strange	Stephen Vincent Strange	Time Stone	Infinity Countdown #5 (July 2018)
Star-Lord	Peter Jason Quill	Power Stone (revealed to be fake)	Infinity Countdown #5 (July 2018)
Turk Barrett		Mind Stone	Infinity Countdown #5 (July 2018)
Ant-Man	Scott Edward Harris Lang	Time Stone	Infinity Wars #4 (October 2018)
Emma Frost		Power Stone	Infinity Wars #4 (October 2018)
Hulk	Robert Bruce Banner	Space Stone	Infinity Wars #4 (October 2018)
Kang the Conqueror	Nathaniel Richards	Reality Stone	Infinity Wars #4 (October 2018)
Loki Laufeyson		Soul Stone	Infinity Wars #4 (October 2018)
Ms. Marvel	Kamala Khan	Mind Stone	Infinity Wars #4 (October 2018)
Apex	Otherone	Power Stone	Avengers Annual, vol. 6 #1 (September 2024)
Colleen Wing		Mind Stone	Avengers Annual, vol. 6 #1 (September 2024)
Multitude	Ward	Soul Stone	Avengers Annual, vol. 6 #1 (September 2024)
Overtime	Hector Bautista	Time Stone	Avengers Annual, vol. 6 #1 (September 2024)
Phil Coulson		Death Stone	Avengers Annual, vol. 6 #1 (September 2024)
Quantum		Space Stone	Avengers Annual, vol. 6 #1 (September 2024)
Star	Ripley Ryan	Reality Stone	Avengers Annual, vol. 6 #1 (September 2024)

== Other versions ==
A team called the Infinity Watch exists in the year 3193, first appearing in Uncanny Avengers #16. Led by Immortus, it includes Captain Marvel, Silver Surfer, Martinex, Yondu, Starhawk, Adam Warlock, and the Vision with the power of The Phoenix.

== Collected editions ==
Title	Material collected	Published date	ISBN
Infinity Watch Vol. 1	Warlock and the Infinity Watch #1-22	April 2016	978-0785195276
Infinity Watch Vol. 2	Warlock and the Infinity Watch #26-42 and Warlock Chronicles #6	June 2016	978-1302900625
Wolverine: Infinity Watch	Wolverine: Infinity Watch #1-5	September 2019	978-1302915810
