= Bob Budiansky =

American comic book editor, writer, penciller

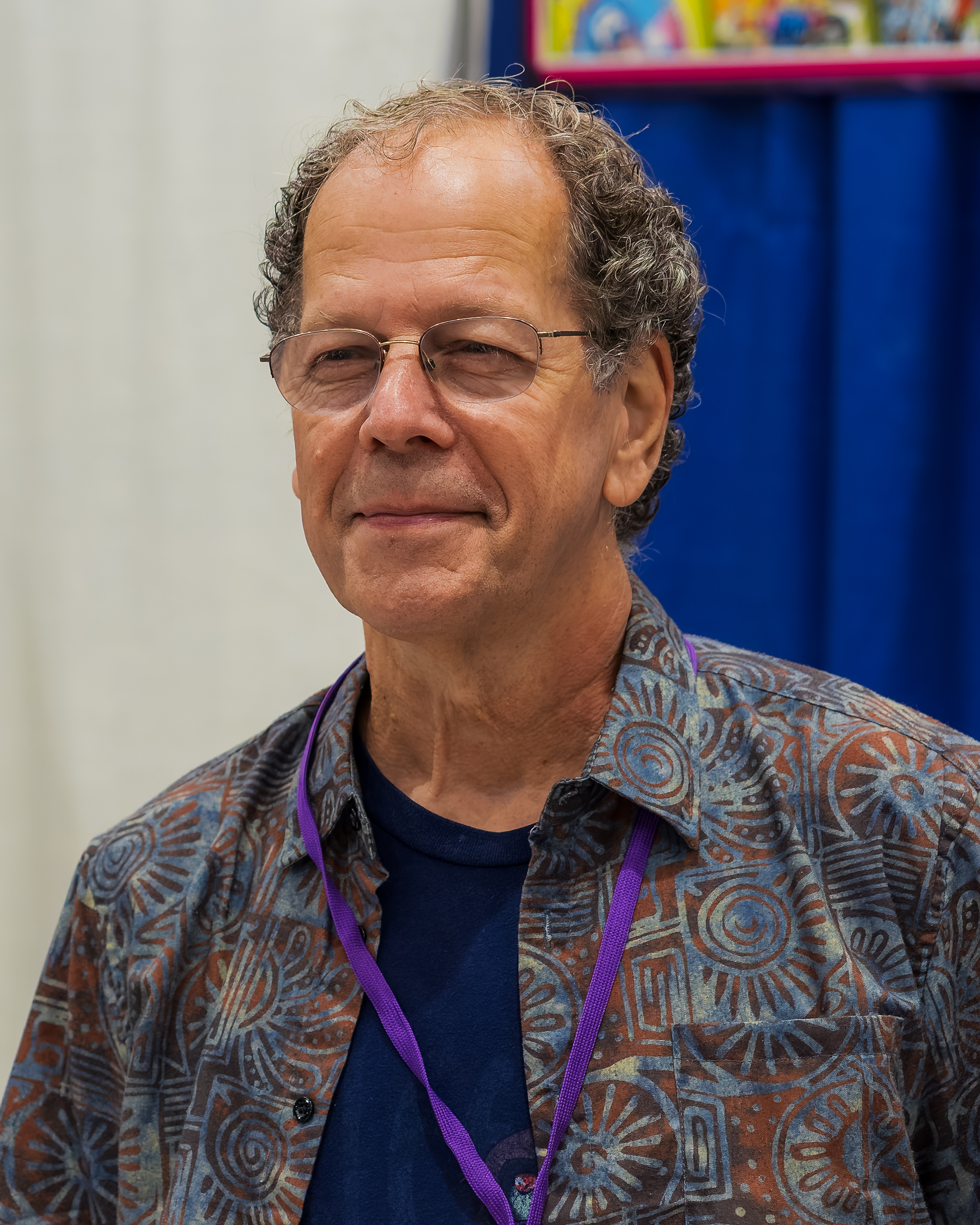
- Budiansky in 2026
- Born: March 15, 1954 (age 72) New York City, U.S.
- Areas: Writer, Penciller, Editor
- Notable works: The Transformers; Ghost Rider; Sleepwalker
- Spouse: Angela Goldman (m. 1991)
- Children: 2

Bob Budiansky (/bʌdiˈænski/; born March 15, 1954) is an American comic book writer, editor, and penciller, best known for his work on Marvel's Transformers comic. He also created the Marvel character Sleepwalker and wrote all 33 issues of that comic. Bob credits Denny O'Neil with naming Optimus Prime in 1983 (IMDB, April 2026).

== Early life ==
Budiansky was born in the Bronx, New York, where he attended public school, then went on to the State University of New York at Buffalo. He was "reintroduced" to comics while in college during the early 1970s. His first published work was Superrunt — a comic strip collaboration with Charles "Sparky" Alzamora, published in the University at Buffalo newspaper The Spectrum while he was a student there.

== Career ==
Budiansky worked at Marvel Comics for approximately 20 years. He is responsible for much of the writing of the original Marvel Transformers comic, and conceived the names of most of the original Transformers, including Decepticon leader Megatron, Autobot medic Ratchet, Starscream, Sideswipe, and the Decepticon Ravage. He also wrote the vast majority of the descriptive "tech spec" biographies printed on the Transformers toy packages that Hasbro produced in the 1980s, giving each figure unique personality traits.

After a long hiatus from the Transformers mythos, Budiansky scripted a new adaptation of the original 1986 The Transformers: The Movie for IDW Publishing in 2006 in honor of the film's 20th anniversary.

Budiansky is also a penciller. He drew the final years of the Johnny Blaze/Zarathos version of Ghost Rider, as well as drawing the majority of Ghost Rider covers from 1978 to 1983 and co-plotting the series with its final writer, J. M. DeMatteis. Following the cancellation of Ghost Rider, Budiansky and DeMatteis continued this method of collaboration in the limited series Prince Namor, the Sub-Mariner. Budiansky recalled, "Marc would typically map out the story arc, discuss it with me, I'd give him feedback, maybe come up with a few extra plot twists and turns, and suggest some scenes that might juice up the story visually. ... Marc had this four-issue story arc more nailed down than some of the Ghost Rider stories we worked on together, so I think I contributed less to the Sub-Mariner plots." Budiansky's covers for Prince Namor are an early example of interlocking covers; when the covers are placed together in two rows, the backgrounds flow into each other.

Starting in 1985 he taught comic book illustration at the Parsons School of Design.

From 1983 till 1996, Budiansky was on staff at Marvel as an editor. During this period, Budiansky oversaw such titles as Fantastic Four, Daredevil and Spider-Man.

=== Honors ===
At BotCon 2010, Hasbro named Budiansky as one of the first four human inductees in the Transformers Hall of Fame for his contributions to the creation of the franchise.

== Personal life ==
Budiansky married Angela Goldman in August 1991.

== Partial bibliography ==
=== As artist ===
- Ghost Rider #68–81 (also co-plotter)
- Prince Namor, the Sub-Mariner #1–4 (also co-plotter and cover colorist)

=== As writer ===
- The Avengers #204, 205, 207 & 208
- Captain Britain #38 & 39 (UK)
- Ghost Rider #77–81
- Marvel Adventures #13
- Marvel Super Special #25
- Sleepwalker #1–33 (1991–1994)
- Spider-Man Comics Weekly #231 (UK)
- The Transformers #22–28; 33–40; 51–56; 66–73; 174 & 175 (UK)
- Transformers Universe #1–4
- The Transformers #1–15; 17–32; 35–42; 44–55
- The Transformers: The Movie #1–4
- The Transformers: Generations #1–3; 4–10 & 12
- The Transformers: Headmasters #1–4
- Uncanny Origins #7 & 13
- What If? #34
- X-Men And Captain Universe #1

=== As inker ===
- Captain Britain #36 (UK)
- Essential Marvel Two-In-One trade paperback volume 3
- Marvel Two-In-One Annual #4
- What If? #34

=== As colorist ===
- The Punisher #36 & 42
- Sleepwalker #1–3

=== As letterer ===
- Spider-Man Adventures #10

== Notes ==
Preceded by Tom DeFalco	Marvel Comics Group Editors-in-Chief; Mark Gruenwald, Marvel Universe titles; Bob Harras, mutant titles; Bob Budiansky, Spider-Man titles; Bobbie Chase, Marvel Edge titles; Carl Potts, licensed-property titles 1994–1995	Succeeded by Bob Harras
Preceded by David Michelinie	Avengers writer 1981 (with Danny Fingeroth)	Succeeded by Jim Shooter
Preceded by Don Perlin	Ghost Rider penciler 1981–1983	Succeeded by N/A
