= Adam Warlock =

Marvel Comics fictional character

- Adam Warlock as depicted in Guardians of the Galaxy vol. 2 #17 (October 2009). Art by Mike Perkins.

Publication information
- Publisher: Marvel Comics
- First appearance: As Him: Fantastic Four #66–67 (September–October 1967); As Adam Warlock: Marvel Premiere #1 (April 1972)
- Created by: Him: Stan Lee (writer); Jack Kirby (artist); Adam Warlock: Roy Thomas (writer); Gil Kane (artist)

In-story information
- Alter ego: Adam Warlock (current); Him (original)
- Species: Cosmic Entity
- Place of origin: Shard Island, Earth
- Team affiliations: Guardians of the Galaxy; Infinity Watch; Universal Church of Truth
- Partnerships: Gamora; Pip the Troll
- Notable aliases: Adam Magus; Master of All Souls; Avatar of Life
- Abilities: Superhuman physiology derived from his artificially created body grants; Superhuman strength, speed, agility, reflexes, stamina, and durability; Cosmic senses; Immortality; Energy manipulation; Regeneration via regenerative cocoon; Quantum magic; Soul manipulation; Spell casting; Energy construct generation; Skilled martial artist; Expert in philosophy, extraterrestrial history, and occultism

Adam Warlock is a character appearing in American comic books published by Marvel Comics. The character first appeared in Fantastic Four #66–67 (cover-dates September 1967 and October 1967) created by Stan Lee and Jack Kirby, originally named Him. The character would later be significantly developed by Roy Thomas and Jim Starlin. Debuting in the Silver Age of Comic Books, the character has starred in the titles Marvel Premiere and Strange Tales as well as five eponymous volumes and several related limited series.

Adam Warlock is artificially created on Earth by the Enclave to be a perfect being and the next evolution of humanity. Originally known only as "Him", he learned of his creators' intentions and rebelled against them to seek a new destiny. Eventually coming across the High Evolutionary, the rechristened Adam Warlock ultimately becomes a hero of the universe, chiefly protecting it from threats such as Thanos, the Universal Church of Truth, and his evil counterpart, the Magus. He is also frequently the bearer of the Soul Stone, one of the fabled Infinity Gems (now called Infinity Stones). The character also serves as the leader of the Infinity Watch and a member of the Guardians of the Galaxy, specializing as the latter's cosmic sorcerer and occult expert.

Adam Warlock has been adapted in various forms of media, including animated television series and video games, and was portrayed by Will Poulter in his live-action debut in the Marvel Cinematic Universe film Guardians of the Galaxy Vol. 3 (2023).

== Publication history ==
=== 1960s to 1970s ===
The character's origin was shown in Fantastic Four #66 (September 1967) in a story written by Stan Lee and pencilled and co-plotted by Jack Kirby. The character also appeared in Fantastic Four #67 (October 1967) and Thor #163–166 (April–July 1969). Because his role in the Fantastic Four story was minor, sources disagree on which issue is the character's true first appearance. (Note: Wizard magazine lists Fantastic Four #66 as the origin and Fantastic Four #67 as the first appearance. Overstreet Comic Book Price Guide and Comics Guaranty list Fantastic Four #67 as a cameo appearance and Thor #165 as the first full appearance.) Writer and then editor-in-chief Roy Thomas and penciler Gil Kane significantly revamped Him as Adam Warlock in Marvel Premiere #1 (April 1972).

In 2009, Thomas explained he had been a fan of the soundtrack to the musical Jesus Christ Superstar and sought to bring the story to comic books in a superhero context: "Yes, I had some trepidation about the Christ parallels, but I hoped there would be little outcry if I handled it tastefully, since I was not really making any serious statement on religion... at least not overtly."

Choosing to use a preexisting character while keeping the series locale separate from mainstream Marvel Earth, Thomas created Counter-Earth, a new planet generated from a chunk of Earth and set in orbit on the opposite side of the sun. Thomas and Kane collaborated on the costume, with the red tunic and golden lightning bolt as their homage to Fawcett Comics' 1940s–1950s character Captain Marvel.

The story continued in the series The Power of Warlock, which ran eight issues (August 1972 – October 1973), with some plotlines concluded in The Incredible Hulk vol. 2, #176–178 (June–August 1974).

In a 2009 retrospective survey of the character, writer Karen Walker said the series

... continued the story of Adam's attempts to drive the Man-Beast [a fallen-angel figure] out of Counter-Earth, but drifted toward standard superhero stories with pseudo-Biblical references injected into them. Warlock spends much of his time trying to convince the High Evolutionary not to destroy the planet, and the rest of his time battling the Man-Beast and his minions. Although the concept of a superhero savior was still present, it often came across as forced, and certainly contradictory to the idea of a pacifistic savior. It is questionable whether the concept could really work in a medium driven by physical conflict.

Marvel Premiere #1 (April 1972). Debut of Him as Adam Warlock. Cover art by Gil Kane and Dan Adkins.

Writer-artist Jim Starlin revived Warlock in Strange Tales #178–181 (February–August 1975). Warlock's adventures became more cosmic in scope as Starlin took the character through an extended storyline referred to as "The Magus Saga".

The reimagined title continued the numbering of The Power of Warlock and began with Warlock #9 (October 1975) and ran seven issues. The bimonthly series was initially written and drawn by Starlin, but was eventually co-penciled and inked by Steve Leialoha. Some plot threads were concluded in Marvel Team-Up #55 (March 1977), Avengers Annual #7 (November 1977) and Marvel Two-in-One Annual #2 (December 1977).

Starlin, in a 2009 interview, recalled,

I had quit [the cosmic superhero series] Captain Marvel over a dispute at that point, but I settled the dispute with Marvel and I was going to come back [to that title]. But [a different team was in place]. So Roy [Thomas] asked me [what character] I wanted to do. So I went home that night and pulled out a bunch of comics. I came across, in the Fantastic Four, Him, and came back the next day and said that's who I wanted to do, and that night I started working on it... I had basically taken Captain Marvel, a warrior, and turned him into sort of a messiah-type character. So when I got to Warlock, I said to myself, 'I got a messiah right here to start off with; where do I go from there?' And I decided a paranoid schizophrenic was the route to take.

Artist Alan Weiss recalled in a 2006 interview there was a "lost" Adam Warlock story, which if completed would have been reminiscent of the Jonathan Swift novel Gulliver's Travels. Portions of it were printed in the second volume of Marvel Masterworks: Warlock. The remainder of the artwork was lost in a New York City taxicab in 1976.

Warlock's adventures were reprinted, with new Starlin covers, in the six-issue "Special Edition" limited series Warlock vol. 2 (December 1982 – May 1983). This reprint series was itself reprinted, with yet another set of new Starlin covers, as Warlock vol. 3 (May–October 1992).

Although regarded as deceased at the time, Warlock made a brief appearance in Marvel Two-in-One #63 (May 1980).

=== Modern iterations ===
Eleven years later, Starlin revived the character and two members of his supporting cast in the miniseries The Infinity Gauntlet #1–6 (July–December 1991). This plot development was a continuation of a larger storyline that began with the resurrection of Thanos in Silver Surfer vol. 3 #34 (February 1990).

Following the events of The Infinity Gauntlet, Warlock and several compatriots starred in the series Warlock and the Infinity Watch. Initially written by Starlin and drawn by Angel Medina, it ran 42 issues (February 1992 – August 1995). Its plots tied directly into the limited series Infinity War (June–November 1992) and Infinity Crusade (June–December 1993).

Warlock starred in several limited series, including Silver Surfer/Warlock: Resurrection #1–4 (March–June 1993); The Warlock Chronicles #1–8 (July 1993 – February 1994); and Warlock vol. 4, #1–4 (November 1998 – February 1999), by writer-penciler Tom Lyle. The character was featured in the intercompany crossovers between Marvel Comics and the Malibu Comics "Ultraverse" in the one-shot Rune / Silver Surfer (April 1995 in indicia, June 1995 on cover); Rune vol. 2, #1–7 (September 1995 – April 1996), and the two-issue Ultraverse Unlimited (June and September 1996).

Following the unrelated 1999–2000 series Warlock vol. 5, featuring the alien cybernetic character Warlock of the New Mutants team, Adam Warlock co-starred with Thanos in the limited series The Infinity Abyss #1–6 (August–October 2002); Marvel Universe: The End #1–6 (May–August 2003; first four issues biweekly); and Thanos #1–6 (December 2003 – April 2004). A version of the character starred in the four-issue limited series Warlock vol. 6 (November 2004 – February 2005), by writer Greg Pak and artist Charlie Adlard. After appearances in Annihilation Conquest: Quasar #1–4 (September–December 2007) and Annihilation: Conquest #1–6 (November 2007 – April 2008), he was a key character in Guardians of the Galaxy vol. 2, #1–25 (July 2008 – April 2010), The Thanos Imperative #1 (June 2010) and the Ignition one-shot (May 2010).

The character appeared in Thanos Annual #1 (July 2014), and in the original graphic novels Thanos: The Infinity Revelation (August 2014) and Thanos: The Infinity Relativity (June 2015), written by Jim Starlin; Warlock appeared in the graphic novel Thanos: The Infinity Finale as well as in the connected mini-series The Infinity Entity (both published in 2016), also written by Starlin.

=== Timeline ===
Timeline of comics starring Warlock or wrapping up storylines from his ended series.

== Fictional character biography ==
=== First incarnation: Him, Counter Earth, and first death ===
Scientists on Earth calling themselves the Enclave created an artificial, perfect human who initially calls himself "Him". After rebelling against his creators, and having a conflict with Thor, Him decides to leave Earth and travels into space. He encounters the High Evolutionary who gives him the name "Warlock". The High Evolutionary requests Warlock's help in saving the artificially created planet Counter-Earth from the evil Man-Beast and gives Warlock the green Soul Gem (also referred to as the "Soul Jewel"), which allows Warlock to capture souls of other beings. When he arrives on Counter-Earth, Warlock is given the name "Adam" by four teenagers who befriend him. After the Man-Beast's defeat, Warlock leaves Counter-Earth to find a new purpose.

In his travels through space, Warlock encounters the Universal Church of Truth, an intergalactic religious organization led by the corrupt Magus. Warlock allies with Pip the Troll, the assassin Gamora, and Thanos of Titan to oppose the Magus. Eventually, Warlock discovers that the Magus is a future version of himself who traveled back in time after being driven insane by the Soul Gem's use. Warlock chooses to alter his timeline by visiting himself a few months into the future and steals his own soul to prevent the Magus from ever existing. Warlock then continues his journeys, knowing he has seen his own death but not knowing exactly when it will happen.

When the Stranger attempts to steal Warlock's Soul Gem, Warlock learns about five other related gems. Thanos gains possession of these gems with the intention of destroying Earth's sun. When Thanos causes mortal harm to Pip and Gamora, Warlock takes their souls to end their suffering. Warlock then enlists the aid of the Avengers, Captain Marvel and Moondragon to stop Thanos. During the battle, Warlock's younger self appears and takes the older Warlock's soul. Inside the gem, Adam is reunited with Pip, Gamora and others in a utopia known as Soul World. Warlock's soul is temporarily freed from the Soul Gem, allowing him to turn Thanos to stone and save Earth.

=== Second incarnation: Infinity Watch and second death ===
Thanos (after being resurrected) once again collects the Infinity Gems into the Infinity Gauntlet, capturing the Silver Surfer and Drax the Destroyer in the Soul Gem for opposing him. In Soul Gem's world, the Silver Surfer meets Adam Warlock and convinces him that his help is needed again to defeat Thanos. Warlock agrees and Pip and Gamora decide to accompany him. Warlock transmits himself and his two friends into new bodies and leads a group of Earth's superheroes, defeating Thanos. Warlock obtains the Infinity Gauntlet, being a near-supreme being of the universe. The cosmic Living Tribunal decides that Warlock cannot be trusted to keep the Infinity Gauntlet and instructs him to divide the gems among other beings of Warlock's choosing. Warlock keeps the Soul Gem for himself and gives one gem each to Pip, Gamora, Drax the Destroyer, Moondragon, and the reformed Thanos. Warlock dubs the group the Infinity Watch.

During Warlock's temporary possession of the Infinity Gauntlet, he purged good and evil from his being, leaving him entirely a creature of logic. His good and evil aspects take on lives as two new physical beings — the evil half is a new incarnation of the Magus, while the good half is a woman calling herself the Goddess. When they threaten the universe, Warlock defeats them with the aid of the Watch and other superheroes, absorbing them into the Soul Gem.

The Infinity Watch disbands when the Infinity Gems are stolen by Rune, a vampire from a parallel universe. Warlock pursues Rune, recovering the gems and returning to his native universe.

Warlock plays a role in protecting the universe several more times, including threats from clones of Thanos, the Heart of the Universe, and the interdimensional being Hunger.

=== Third Incarnation: Annihilation Conquest, Guardians of Galaxy, Infinity Revelation, etc. ===
==== "Annihilation: Conquest" ====
In the 2007-2008 "Annihilation: Conquest" storyline, Moondragon and Phyla-Vell seek Warlock's help to free the alien Kree from the invading Phalanx. They find Adam in suspension on a remote world, having retreated there to recover after the Annihilation Wave. Awakened prematurely, Adam's powers fluctuate wildly and he refuses to assist, until he is abducted by Ultron, who chooses Adam as a new host for his intelligence. With assistance from his namesake, Warlock of the Technarx, Adam is able to remove Ultron from his body. Once the Phalanx are defeated, Warlock joins the newly formed Guardians of the Galaxy. Adam performs a vital role on the team, using his newly stabilized powers to seal rifts in reality caused by the recent cosmic wars. However, Adam quits the team on discovering Star-Lord had Mantis use her telepathic powers to influence his decision to join. When the event known as the "War of Kings" begins, Adam reluctantly rejoins the Guardians in an attempt to prevent further cosmic devastation. At the war's conclusion, a giant cosmic rift named "the Fault" is created. Adam manages to successfully seal it, only for Phyla-Vell to attempt to assassinate him afterward, revealing Adam has turned into the Magus. With assistance from Kang the Conqueror, Star-Lord attempts to prevent Adam turning into Magus, only for Adam to reveal that the method required to stabilize the Fault means he has already been the Magus for several months.

Once again leading the Universal Church of Truth, the Magus allies himself with Lord Mar-Vell, but is killed when he fails a mission. The Universal Church of Truth resurrects the Magus as a child, but he is quickly captured and imprisoned by the Annihilators. His cocoon remains under the Annihilators' watch.

==== The Infinity Revelation ====
While on a new quest, Thanos encounters Warlock's soul in Death's domain. It follows Thanos back to the living world, where it regains human form. Warlock accompanies Thanos on a journey as their universe merges with another one. Due to the convergence, Warlock is retroactively replaced by his counterpart from the other universe.

Extremely disgruntled by the experience, the new Warlock left Thanos to ponder his situation, and he eventually ended up on "New Krall" acting as a gladiator in a fighting pit. Thanos receives a message through time/space from his omnipotent former self to seek this new Adam Warlock who is now unnaturally more powerful than before. Agreeing, Thanos first seeks Pip the Troll to teleport to New Krall and then contacts Gamora to also go to Adam, as they both are his closest friends and can keep him from doing any damage to the universe. During this time Annihilus begins a re-invasion of the Positive Zone searching for an immense power source that turns out to be Adam himself and launches a devastating siege on New Krall. The Shi'ar, led by Gladiator (also looking for the power source), appear and Annihilus, now with the power of the Hulk and a new fear projection ability, defeats them. Pip swiftly teleports Adam, Gamora, the Guardians of the Galaxy, and himself back to the Guardians' ship to safety and are joined by Thanos, where they discover the universe that Adam created was not destroyed, but became a part of him and has given him the power of Eternity and Infinity.

Thanos enhances Pip's abilities to teleport the ship to Annihilus' empire to stop Annihilus once and for all, but are overwhelmed by Annihilus, who teleports Thanos into limbo and takes Adam prisoner (by placing a neural disruptor on him), forcing the Guardians to retreat. Pip stays behind, stating Adam is his only friend and he will not abandon him. The comatose Adam is placed into Annihilus' ship's power source to use him as battery. Pip, after hiding on Annihilus' ship for three months, finds the comatose Adam and launches a rescue mission, killing his guards and striking Adam repeatedly to waken him. Finally awakening, Adam unconsciously destroys the universe and is left floating in a void. Panicking, Adam calls out for Thanos and wills him back into existence. Thanos then proposes to Adam a plan to beseech the One Above All to recreate the universe. The One Above All agrees, on the condition Adam act as the universe's new Living Tribunal. Adam and Thanos restore the universes and immediately kill Annihilus and his fleet, ending his threat once and for all. Finally, on Thanos' request, the "new" Living Tribunal resurrects the original Adam Warlock from the point he was killed moments before the convergence took place.

The true Adam, alive again, decides to take Thanos' advice to go back to "the existence that is his". He immediately goes to Pip the Troll, who runs to his friend with open arms, and they return to their old life of adventure.

==== Infinity Conflict ====
In Thanos: The Infinity Conflict, when Adam senses that something is not right, he and Pip go to confront Thanos who then kills Adam in the blink of an eye. After reviving in Chandilar, Adam and Pip go to an abandoned ancient planet containing old temples. Here Adam is again killed by a rocket launched by Thanos. After another resurrection he and Pip go to Titan and encounter Eros. However, he is yet again killed by Thanos via another missile. He is then revived in the presence of the Living Tribunal who informs Adam that Thanos has gotten his universe's Astral Regulator and used it to absorb the various cosmic beings to become reality. The Living Tribunal tasks Adam to follow the necessary steps to stop Thanos. While travelling to the Astral Plane, Adam encountered his past versions who warns Adam about the result of what he is about to do. He confronts Eros and Pip who were about to kill the infant Thanos and warns them that if Thanos died then Magus would be able to take over reality. They then return to the present where he kills Eros who then returns to life after being rejected by Mistress Death now existing outside the norm, just like Adam and Thanos, which is essential to defeat Thanos.

In Thanos: The Infinity Ending, after the future omnipotent Thanos absorbed the Living Tribunal and the Above-All-Others, Adam, Starfox and Pip realizing that they were too late escape, except for Adam who confronts Thanos before being banished by the omnipresent being within himself. Adam went to Kang the Conqueror's ship where he sought to use his time-traveling technology to find a way to defeat Thanos, and realized that Thanos' inexperience is the key to his defeat. After waking Kang from the stasis he was put by Thanos, Adam decides to enter Thanos' psyche. However, before he could proceed he is confronted by his past selves who did not want Adam to sacrifice himself. Being unwilling to let Thanos kill himself and take all existences with him, Adam battles his past selves, eventually using the Soul Stone of one of the Adams to kill them. After that he enters Thanos' psyche where he saw different memories through portals, and eventually came across Hunger and manipulates the being into attacking the past future omnipotent Thanos. Still travelling through different portals, he finally came across the present Thanos who had been trapped within his future omnipotent self and Eros with Pip who try to free Thanos, but were discovered. After that Adam tells Thanos that the only way to defeat his future omnipotent self and get free was trust. Then as the future omnipotent Thanos was about to end everything, Adam had Kang prevent Eros from proceeding with his plan, allowing Eros to evade capture. This causes present Thanos to take control of his powers and reset everything prior to the machinations of his future self who ceases to exist. Finding himself outside everything Adam was rescued by Kang and informed the Conqueror about what had transpired. Before returning to normal, Adam asked Kang to go on one final time travel to retrieve the green soul stone.

==== Infinity Countdown ====
Warlock and Kang ambush the Guardians of the Galaxy during their trip to the planet Oblitus. Gamora attempted to take the Soul Gem from Warlock. When Drax the Destroyer held onto the Soul Gem, he discovered that the Soulworld inside is corrupted. Drax knocked out Gamora and made off with Warlock and Kang. As the rest of the Guardians of the Galaxy do not want to help Gamora pursue Warlock and Kang, she went off on her own. Warlock is among the Infinity Gem holders contacted by Doctor Strange, who states that they must reform the Infinity Watch to safeguard the Infinity Gems from such calamities like Thanos.

==== Infinity Wars ====
During the Infinity Wars storyline, Adam Warlock senses the corruption of the Soulworld and enlists Doctor Strange to help deal with the corruption in Soulworld. While dealing with a Souleater, it is revealed that Doctor Strange has the Time Gem. Doctor Strange tries to get Adam to give up the Soul Infinity Gem. Before leaving, Adam warns Doctor Strange that Kang the Conqueror is not the only person looking for the Infinity Gems. Adam Warlock saves a cyclist during a time freeze when he, Drax the Destroyer, and Iron Lad show up. Doctor Strange gathers Star-Lord, Adam, Black Widow's clone, Captain Marvel, and Turk Barrett (who has Bullseye, Sandman, Spot, Tombstone, and Typhoid Mary in his company) in Central Park where Doctor Strange discovers that Thanos is dead. As Gamora in her Requiem alias uses the Reality Gem to partially fuse Captain America and Doctor Strange to get the Mind Gem and the Time Gem, Gamora beheads Adam. As Loki, Emma Frost, Hulk, Ant-Man, Ms. Marvel, and Kang the Conqueror gather together, they find Adam and suggest they exit the Soulworld only for Adam to declare that they need to defeat Devondra first. This causes them to round up Arachknight (a combination of Spider-Man and Moon Knight), Ghost Panther (a combination of Ghost Rider and Black Panther), Green Widow (a combination of Black Widow and She-Hulk), Iron Hammer (a combination of Iron Man and Thor), Man-Thing-Thang-Thoom (a combination of Man-Thing and Fin Fang Foom), Moon Squirrel (a combination of Moon Girl and Squirrel Girl) and Tippysaurus (a combination of Tippy-Toe and Devil Dinosaur), Soldier Supreme (a combination of Captain America and Doctor Strange), Weapon Hex (a combination of Scarlet Witch and X-23), and Fantastic Two members Mister Invisible (a combination of Mister Fantastic and Invisible Woman) and Hot Rocks (a combination of Human Torch and Thing) as well as a saxophone-playing version of Drax the Destroyer.

Loki's group and the warped heroes are fighting Devondra as Adam Warlock and Soldier Supreme arrive, with the latter stating that he does not want to be unmade. Adam states that if they can defeat Devondra, Warp World will still exist, though Loki's group will have to use the Infinity Gems to confront Gamora outside. Soldier Supreme notices that Devondra keeps regenerating as Adam finds that Gamora and the alternate Phylla-Vel and Moondragon are now in the Soul Gem. After some talking with Soldier Supreme, Adam plans to copy the souls in Warp World to bring them and Devondra into the real world as Hulk punches Devondra into the hole leading to the real world. Adam returns the Guardians of the Galaxy to their normal state while separating Drax's Destroyer half from his Arthur Douglas half. Once the copies are made with the help of the Infinity Gems, Emma Frost begins to wipe the memories of the incident to avoid unrest as Drax meets the alternate version of his daughter. After Devondra is defeated, Adam grabs the Time Gem, freezes time, and states that the Infinity Gems must decide the outcome. After time resumes, Star-Lord notices that Gamora is gone as Adam sent her to a location so that she can redeem herself. Later on, Adam is staring at the stars in the desert and draws a symbol in the sand claiming that a part of him is missing.

== Powers and abilities ==
Adam Warlock is an artificially created cosmic being whose existence represents a potential pinnacle of human evolution and cosmic origins influenced by greater powers. Within the Marvel Multiverse, he is recognized as belonging to the higher echelons of powerful beings. As a significant cosmic being, the character possesses recuperative powers that manifest through the creation of a cocoon. This cocoon serves to preserve the character, regenerate injuries, and facilitate his resurrection. Furthermore, he possesses immortality, although he can be physically killed, his soul and spirit cannot be permanently extinguished or claimed by Death. Warlock is recognized as an astral outsider, rendering his actions, presence, and future impervious to perception by others through magical or cosmic methods.

In all his incarnations, Warlock consistently possesses artificial genetic structure that results in bone and muscle tissue denser than that of a typical human, granting him superhuman strength, stamina, durability, agility, and reflexes. Additionally, his multi-compartmental brain provides him with ultra senses, which grant him heightened levels of both cosmic and mystical awareness. Warlock's body can also tap into cosmic energies to enhance his physical abilities.

=== Energy manipulation ===
One of the prominent abilities possessed by Adam Warlock is the manipulation of various forms of energy. As the character evolves, his energy manipulation powers grow stronger with each resurrection, granting him access to new energies to manipulate over time. In one of his more recent versions, the character's manipulation abilities underwent a substantial increase, granting him the capacity to directly absorb energies from others and manipulate the energies within their bodies, effectively neutralizing their abilities. These formidable powers played a crucial role in his triumph over both Quasar and Silver Surfer on one occasion.

- Metaphysical quantum energy: In the character's incarnation that followed the Annihilation: Conquest storyline, he is recognized for his manipulation of a unique form of energy, commonly referred to as Quantum Magic and Cosmic Sorcery in other media. Referred to as a "Quantum Mage," this magical practice allows him to manifest magical effects by utilizing the available energies and power in his surroundings, as well as employing "conjured psi-llables." This grants him spell-casting abilities, energy manipulation abilities, time manipulation powers, and various other capabilities. These abilities were bestowed upon him to address the task of repairing reality in response to the future predicament caused by the expansion of the Fault into the Cancerverse, an event that occurred during his appearance in the Guardians of the Galaxy (2008) series.
- Cosmic energy: In most incarnations, Warlock can manipulate cosmic energies, utilizing them for a range of purposes including healing, projecting energy blasts, and decreasing gravity to facilitate flight. These abilities are later facilitated by the character's employment of "quantum magic".
- Magical energies: In line with his name, Warlock acquired proficiency in magic, bestowing upon him spiritual powers. He possesses spiritual abilities that are distinct from the Soul Gem, enabling him to revive himself and other beings by transforming deceased bodies. Additionally, the character demonstrates the capability to conduct exorcisms, perceive the aura and soul of individuals, and display a high level of resistance against soul-manipulating powers employed by others. These magical abilities were later replaced by the character's employment of "quantum magic", which allowed for the same powers at a wider breadth.

=== Equipment ===
- Soul Gem: The Soul Gem possesses a consciousness of its own and demonstrates a vampiric hunger for the life energies of organic beings. It contains an idyllic pocket universe that hosts all the souls the Gem has ever taken. Using the Gem, Adam Warlock has demonstrated the power to devolve the followers of Man-Beast into the animals from which they evolved, as well as revert the Brute into Counter-Earth Reed Richards.

== Reception ==
Throughout the character's publication history, Warlock has garnered a dedicated following and achieved cult favorite status. This recognition can be attributed to his notable presence and the revamp of his character by Jim Starlin in the 1970s, as well as his significant involvement in the Infinity Gauntlet storyline.

== Other versions ==
=== The Magus ===
The Magus, from Strange Tales #181 (August 1975). Art by Jim Starlin.

There have been three incarnations of the Magus (/ˈmeɪɡəs/), all of whom are the dark aspect of Adam Warlock.

The original Magus is an older, evil Adam Warlock who has traveled to the past and rules a religious empire called the Universal Church of Truth. To ensure his own creation, he guides his younger self through a series of actions that will result in him becoming the Magus. With the aid of Thanos, Warlock alters his future by killing his future self before he can evolve into the Magus, destroying the Magus's timeline and erasing him from existence.

When Warlock acquires the Infinity Gauntlet, he expels good and evil from his soul, unintentionally giving them corporeal forms. The evil half names himself the Magus and attempts to gain the Infinity Gauntlet for himself. He fails when the Infinity Watch trick him into claiming the Gauntlet when the Reality Gem has been replaced by a powerless replica, creating a subtle flaw in the Gauntlet's powers that allows his enemies to overpower him, leaving the Magus to be sealed away in the Soul Gem by Warlock. Since he is only part of a soul, he cannot interact with the other inhabitants of Soul World and exists only as a phantom. The Magus escapes the Soul Gem in an immaterial form, absorbing the life energies of others to regain tangibility. He is defeated by Genis-Vell and reverts to an ethereal entity. The Magus retaliates by wounding Genis' friend Moondragon and claiming she is destined to become his slave.

Warlock becomes a third version of Magus when he repairs damage to the spacetime continuum, using the alternate future where he became the Magus as a dimensional anchor to stabilize a potentially galaxy-destroying rift called "the Fault". Though Star-Lord attempts to prevent Magus from existing, he reveals he has been in control for months. Magus effortlessly overpowers and seemingly kills several of the Guardians before Star-Lord can use a Cosmic Cube to kill him. However, the Magus in fact fakes his death, and those of the Guardians he had killed, abducting them to one of the worlds owned by the Universal Church of Truth to be tortured and indoctrinated into his service, until they manage to free themselves. The Magus works for the evil Lord Mar-Vell and is killed when he fails a mission. The Universal Church of Truth resurrects him as a child on Earth, who is then imprisoned by the Annihilators inside a Kree Sentry.

The Magus later seeks to gather the Infinity Stones with the intention of destroying the universe, but is killed during his search by Ultron. During the "Infinity Wars" storyline, Gamora finds a younger version of Magus inside, who tells her he was sent by a "friend".

=== The Goddess ===
The Goddess is the embodiment of Adam Warlock's goodness, created when he uses the Infinity Gauntlet to remove the quality from himself. She appears as a central figure in the 1993 limited series Infinity Crusade. She assembles a collection of Cosmic Cubes and forges them into a Cosmic Egg. Using its power, she recreates Counter-Earth, dubbing it Paradise Omega. Embarking on a crusade to eliminate sin, the Goddess uses telepathy to control spiritual beings across the universe, recruiting them to her cause. When Warlock and Earth's other heroes learn of her plan to destroy all sin by destroying anything capable of sin, they rally against her. She is defeated when her followers learn her true goal, and is absorbed into the soul gem.

=== Earth X ===
In the Earth X limited series, Mar-Vell is reincarnated as the child of the synthetic Adam Warlock/Him and Kismet/Her.

== In other media ==
=== Television ===
- Adam Warlock appears in the Silver Surfer episode "The Forever War", voiced by Oliver Becker. This version is a genetically engineered being who was created to fight the Kree, but was trapped in a time prison due to his paranoia. After being freed by the Silver Surfer, Warlock eventually chooses to return to his prison after learning of a civil war occurring on his planet as well as the Supreme Intelligence's desire to use him to empower the Kree.
- Adam Warlock appears in The Super Hero Squad Show, voiced by Dave Boat. This version was imprisoned in the Soul Gem sometime prior to the series. After Warlock and Thanos escape the Soul Gem, they establish a chicken farm together.
- Adam Warlock appears in The Avengers: Earth's Mightiest Heroes episode "Michael Korvac", voiced by Kirk Thornton. This version is a member of the Guardians of the Galaxy.
- Adam Warlock and the Magus appear in Guardians of the Galaxy (2015), voiced primarily by Eric Bauza and by Tara Strong as a child. This version is worshiped by the Universal Believers, who intend to use him to usher in a new golden age. Additionally, it is reputed that the Nova Centurions would be loyal to Warlock if he was good and destroy him if he turned evil. After Warlock emerges from his sarcophagus, the Guardians of the Galaxy and Cosmo the Spacedog convince him to do good and he leaves Earth to find his destiny.

=== Film ===
- Adam Warlock makes a non-speaking cameo appearance in Planet Hulk.
- After being teased in the Marvel Cinematic Universe films Thor: The Dark World, Guardians of the Galaxy (2014), and Guardians of the Galaxy Vol. 2, Adam Warlock appears in Guardians of the Galaxy Vol. 3, portrayed by Will Poulter. This version is a perfect Sovereign created by his mother Ayesha and the High Evolutionary to capture Rocket. After the pair release him from his birthing pod before his maturation is complete, Warlock fights the Guardians of the Galaxy, but is defeated by them, and forced to retreat. Following Ayesha's death, Warlock attempts to destroy the High Evolutionary's ship, but succumbs to his injuries and fails, though Groot rescues him. Inspired by Groot's observation that everyone deserves a second chance, Warlock later saves Star-Lord and joins a new iteration of the Guardians under Rocket's leadership.

=== Video games ===
- Adam Warlock and the Magus appear in Marvel Super Heroes: War of the Gems.
- The Magus appears in Marvel: Avengers Alliance 2.
- Adam Warlock and the Magus appear as a playable and non-playable character respectively in Marvel Avengers Alliance.
- Adam Warlock appears as a non-playable character in Marvel Heroes.
- Adam Warlock appears as a playable character in Marvel: Future Fight.
- Adam Warlock and the Magus appear in Marvel's Guardians of the Galaxy, voiced by Brent Skagford.
- Adam Warlock appears as a playable character in Marvel Rivals.

== Collected editions ==
- Marvel Masterworks Warlock (hardcover):
  - Volume 1 (collects Marvel Premiere #1–2, Warlock #1–8 and The Incredible Hulk #176–178), 273 pages, January 2007, ISBN 0-7851-2411-X
  - Volume 2 (collects Strange Tales #178–181, Warlock #9–15, Marvel Team-Up #55, The Avengers Annual #7, Marvel Two-in-One Annual #2), 320 pages, June 2009, ISBN 0-7851-3511-1
- Essential Warlock Volume 1 (collects Marvel Premiere #1–2, Warlock #1–15, The Incredible Hulk #176–178, Strange Tales #178–181, Marvel Team-Up #55, The Avengers Annual #7, and Marvel Two-in-One Annual #2 in black and white), 567 pages, 2012, ISBN 0-7851-6331-X
- Warlock by Jim Starlin: The Complete Collection (collects Strange Tales #178–181, Warlock #9–15, The Avengers Annual #7, Marvel Two-In-One Annual #2), 328 pages, February 2014, ISBN 978-0785188476
- Warlock Omnibus (collects Fantastic Four #66-67, Thor #165-166, Marvel Premiere #1–2, Warlock #1–15, The Incredible Hulk #176–178, The Incredible Hulk Annual #6, Strange Tales #178–181, Marvel Team-Up #55, The Avengers Annual #7, Marvel Two-in-One #61-63 and Marvel Two-in-One Annual #2), 904 pages, 2023
- The Infinity Gauntlet (collects Infinity Gauntlet limited series), 256 pages, September 2011, ISBN 978-0785156598
- Infinity Gauntlet Aftermath (Silver Surfer vol. 3 #60–66, Doctor Strange: Sorcerer Supreme #36, Warlock & the Infinity Watch #1–6, material from Silver Surfer Annual #5), 352 pages, September 2013, ISBN 978-0785184867
- The Infinity War (collects Infinity War limited series; Warlock and the Infinity Watch #7–10; Marvel Comics Presents #108–111), 400 pages, April 2006, ISBN 0-7851-2105-6
- Infinity War Aftermath (collects Warlock & The Infinity Watch #11–17, Silver Surfer/Warlock: Resurrection #1–4, Quasar #41–43; Material From Marvel Comics Presents #112, Marvel Holiday Special #2, Marvel Swimsuit Special #2), 368 pages, November 2015, ISBN 978-0785198147
- Infinity Crusade:
  - Volume 1 (collects Infinity Crusade #1–3, Warlock Chronicles #1–3, Warlock and the Infinity Watch #18–19), 248 pages, December 2008, ISBN 0-7851-3127-2
  - Volume 2 (collects Infinity Crusade #4–6, Warlock Chronicles #4–5, Warlock and the Infinity Watch #20–22), 248 pages, February 2009, ISBN 0-7851-3128-0
- Thor: Blood and Thunder (collects Thor #468–471, Silver Surfer #86–88, Warlock Chronicles #6–8, Warlock and the Infinity Watch #23–25), 336 pages, July 2011, ISBN 978-0-7851-5094-7
- Infinity Watch:
  - Volume 1 (collects Warlock and the Infinity Watch #1–22), 512 pages, April 2016, ISBN 978-0785195276
  - Volume 2 (collects Warlock Chronicles 6, Warlock and the Infinity Watch #26–42), 432 pages, June 2016, ISBN 978-1302900625
- The Infinity Entity (collects: The Infinity Entity #1–4, Marvel Premiere #1), 116 pages, June 2016, ISBN 978-0785194217
