= Infinity Gems =

Fictional cosmic items with the power to grant a user an ability/abilities

- Thanos with the six main Infinity Gems, from The Thanos Quest #1 (September 1990). Art by Ron Lim, John Beatty and Tom Vincent.

Publication information
- Publisher: Marvel Comics
- First appearance: Soul Gem: Marvel Premiere #1 (April 1972); Mind Gem: Captain Marvel #41 (Nov. 1975); Power & Time Gems: Marvel Team-Up #55 (Mar. 1977); All six Gems: Avengers Annual #7 (1977). In the Infinity Gauntlet: The Silver Surfer Vol. 3 #44 (Dec. 1990); Ego Gem: Eliminator #3 (July 1995); Death Stone: The Infinity Gauntlet Vol. 2 #5 (Nov. 2015)

In story information
- Type: Jewels
- Element of stories featuring: Adam Warlock; Thanos

The Infinity Gems (originally referred to as Soul Gems and later as Infinity Stones) are six fictional gems appearing in American comic books published by Marvel Comics, named after and embodying various aspects of existence. The gems can grant whoever wields them various powers in accordance to the aspect of existence they represent, and have the potential of turning the wielder into a god-like being when the main six (Mind, Power, Reality, Soul, Space, and Time) are held together. Thus, they are among the most powerful and sought-after items in the Marvel Universe; playing important roles in several storylines, in which they were wielded by characters such as Thanos and Adam Warlock. Some of these stories depict additional Infinity Gems or similar objects. Although the Infinity Gems altogether give their user omnipotence, the Gems only function in the universe they belong to and not in alternate realities.

The Infinity Gems have appeared in several media adaptations outside of comics, including the Marvel Cinematic Universe film franchise, where they are called the Infinity Stones and have their colors altered. These changes were later adapted into the comics. In the Marvel Cinematic Universe, the Cosmic Cube is depicted as the Tesseract, a container for the Space Stone; the two artifacts are unrelated in the comics.

== Publication history ==
The first appearance of an Infinity Gem occurred in 1972 in Marvel Premiere #1. It was originally called a "Soul Gem". In 1976, a second "Soul Gem" appeared in a Captain Marvel story, which established that there were six Soul Gems, each with different powers. One year later, two more "Soul Gems" were introduced in a Warlock crossover involving Spider-Man. The main six Gems appeared when Thanos attempted to use them to extinguish every star in the universe. In a 1988 storyline in Silver Surfer vol. 3, the Elders of the Universe tried to use six of the "Soul Gems" to steal the energy of the world-eating entity Galactus.

In the 1990 limited series The Thanos Quest, Thanos refers to the entire main set as "Infinity Gems" for the first time. In this storyline, he steals most of the Gems for the second time and reveals the Gems to be the remains of an omnipotent being. In the miniseries The Infinity Gauntlet, Thanos uses the Gems to become nearly omnipotent and kills half the universe's population as a gift to his love, the cosmic embodiment of Death. Though Thanos easily repels an attack by Earth's heroes and other cosmic entities, the Gauntlet is eventually stolen from him by Nebula, who undoes the last 24 hours, including his mass killings. Adam Warlock recovers the Gauntlet and, by order of the Living Tribunal, divides the Gems among a group he calls the Infinity Watch, consisting of himself, Gamora, Pip the Troll, Drax the Destroyer, Moondragon, and Thanos. The group's adventures in defending the Gems appear in the series Warlock and the Infinity Watch (1992–1995).

As a result of the Incursions, the multiverse is destroyed. However, Doctor Doom combines fragments of several alternate realities into Battleworld. Doctor Strange gathers the Infinity Gems realities into a new Infinity Gauntlet, which he leaves hidden until the surviving heroes of Earth-616 return. The Gauntlet is claimed by Black Panther, who uses it to keep Doom occupied until Mister Fantastic can disrupt his power source.

After the multiverse is recreated, the Infinity Gems become known as the Infinity Stones and have altered powers. The Stones are shown to have a pocket universe existing within each of them. Loki discovers that the Stones originated from the primordial universe where the Celestials reside, guarding a deposit of countless Infinity Stones which they infuse with cosmic energy and disperse across the multiverse. Adam Warlock later uses the Soul Stone to grant the other Stones sentience and let them choose their own wielders.

=== Cosmic Cube ===
The Cosmic Cube is the name of several containment devices that can empower whoever wields them. Although the first version, introduced in Tales of Suspense #79 (July 1966) and created by Stan Lee and Jack Kirby, originated on Earth as a weapon built by Advanced Idea Mechanics, most are of alien origins. The incarnations of the Cube are suffused with reality-warping energy originating from the realm of the Beyonders. After a sufficient but undefined period of time, the Cube gains sentience while retaining its reality-warping powers.

In the storyline Avengers: Standoff!, Maria Hill and S.H.I.E.L.D. use pieces of a Cosmic Cube to create Kobik, a near-omnipotent child. With Kobik's help, S.H.I.E.L.D. brainwashes supervillains into becoming mild-mannered civilians, who are imprisoned in a gated community called Pleasant Hill. When the villains rebel, Kobik decides to rejuvenate Steve Rogers, then reduced to an old man due to the breakdown of his Super-Soldier serum. Due to the Red Skull's influence over the Cube from which Kobik was made, she unknowingly replaces Rogers with a covert Hydra loyalist version of him. This results in the real Rogers' consciousness becoming trapped within the Cube until he finds Kobik and encourages her to set things right.

== Description ==
Each Gem is shaped like a small oval and is named after, and represents, a different characteristic of existence. Possessing any single Gem grants control over the aspect of existence the Gem represents. If a user is able to tap into the full potential of a Gem, the user gains complete control over a Gem's aspect of existence. In continuity following the Marvel Legacy initiative, the Infinity Gems are known as the Infinity Stones and have had their colors altered to match the Infinity Stones from the Marvel Cinematic Universe. Thanos created an additional gem, the Death Stone, after imprisoning Death within it.

The seven Infinity Stones include:

Name	Color		Abilities	Pocket universe (2018–present)
Name	Original (1972–2016)	Marvel Legacy (2017–present)	Abilities	Pocket universe (2018–present)
Mind	Blue	Yellow	Allows the user to enhance their mental and psionic abilities and access the thoughts and dreams of other beings. At full potential, backed by the Power Gem, the Mind Gem can access all minds in existence simultaneously.	The Mindscape: Allows the user to bring anything they imagine or dream of to life. Overseen by the Sleepwalkers.
Power	Red	Purple	Allows the user to access and manipulate all forms of energy and powers; enabling them to enhance their physical strength and durability, augment existing abilities, and boost the effects of the other five Gems. At full potential, the Power Gem grants nigh-omnipotence.	The Arena: Resembles a colosseum where heroes fight each other in a contest of might. Ruled by Dynamus, the embodiment of the Power Cosmic.
Reality	Yellow	Red	Allows the user to fulfill their wishes, even if the wish is in direct contradiction with scientific laws, and do things that would normally be impossible. At full potential, when backed by the other five Gems, the Reality Gem can alter reality on a universal scale.	World Pool: Used to access alternate realities which are portrayed as an endless comic book collection. Overseen by Archivus, the chronicler of the Multiverse.
Soul	Green	Orange	Allows the user to steal, control, manipulate, and alter living and dead souls; as well as animate the motionless. The Soul Gem also acts as a gateway to an idyllic pocket universe. At full potential, when backed by the Power Gem, the Soul Gem grants control over all life in the universe.	Soul World: The final resting place for all lost spirits. Overseen by the Soul-Eater Devondra.
Space	Purple	Blue	Allows the user to exist in any location; move any object anywhere throughout reality; warp or rearrange space; teleport themselves and others; increase their speed, and alter the distance between objects contrary to the laws of physics. At full potential, when backed by the Power Gem, the Space Gem grants nigh-omnipresence.	The Vast: An endless expanse of empty existence. Its ruler is unknown.
Time	Orange	Green	Allows the user to see into the past and the future; stop, slow down, speed up or reverse the flow of time; travel through time; change the past and the future; age and de-age beings, and trap people or entire universes in unending loops of time. At full potential, when backed by the Power Gem, the Time Gem grants nigh-omniscience and total control over the past, present, and future.	Ellipsis: Manipulates the flow of time for anyone within it. Its ruler is unknown.
Death	-	Black	An artificial stone that Thanos created after imprisoning Death. It can emit dark energy that is fatal over time.	

Additional Gems have appeared in crossover media and alternate universes outside the Marvel Universe.

Name	Color	Powers and capabilities
Ego	White	The Ego Gem contains the consciousness of the cosmic entity Nemesis and recreates her when united with the other six Gems. The Ego Gem is found in the Ultraverse when Loki attempts to steal the other six Gems.
Death	Yellow	In The Infinity Gauntlet (2015), Anwen Bakian creates the Death Stone using the Reality Stone and uses it to kill Thanos; it is later recreated by Thanos, before binding itself to Phil Coulson.
Continuity	Black	The Continuity Stone appears in Deadpool, and enables total control over Marvel's continuity.

== Other versions ==
=== Council of Reeds ===
The Reed Richards of Earth-616, in an attempt to "solve everything", meets with a council of his alternate universe counterparts. Three of the alternate Reeds use versions of the Infinity Gauntlet, which is revealed to only work in its universe of origin.

=== Contest of Champions ===
In the Contest of Champions miniseries, an alternate version of Tony Stark uses the Reality Gem to win the superhero civil war and affect the outcome of a presidential election. When Stark tries to use the Gem on Battleworld, he is killed by the Maestro.

=== Heroes Reborn (2021) ===
In an alternate reality depicted in the Heroes Reborn miniseries, the Infinity Gems are in the possession of Thanos, who has them placed in his Infinity Rings.

=== New Avengers ===
In the "Incursion" storyline, the Avengers travel to a parallel Earth where a pastiche of the Justice League have replaced the Avengers, who died in a previous cataclysm. The Gems are square planes of "forever glass" which are assembled into the "Wishing Cube", a composite of the concepts of the Infinity Gems and the Cosmic Cube.

=== Ultimate Marvel ===
The Infinity Gems and the Infinity Gauntlet appear in the Ultimate Marvel imprint. The Mind Gem is used by Modi (Thor's son) to control both Director Flumm and Cassie Lang, but they are stopped by the Ultimates. The Power Gem is revealed to be in the possession of former S.H.I.E.L.D. agent Sayuri Kyota, while a second Infinity Gauntlet is recovered by Thor and Susan Storm. Kang the Conqueror allies with the Hulk, Reed Richards, and Quicksilver as part of a plan to steal the two Gauntlets, which results in the destruction of the Triskelion. Quicksilver recovers two additional Gems, allowing the villains to teleport away. Richards is later able to recover another of the Gems, which is found lodged in Tony Stark's brain. He informs Stark that the Infinity Gems are needed to save the world from a coming cataclysm that will destroy the entire universe. After brainwashing Johnny Storm and forcing him to travel to the Earth's core, the Dark Ultimates recover the final gem, but are defeated by the Ultimates. The gems shatter, rendering the Gauntlets useless.

=== What If? ===
In a reality where Doctor Doom retained the power of the Beyonder, Doom acquired the Infinity Gems from the Elders of the Universe and used them to defeat the Celestials in a 407-year-long war before finally forsaking his power.

In an alternate reality where the original Fantastic Four died, a new Fantastic Four – consisting of Spider-Man, Hulk, Wolverine, and Ghost Rider – is formed. With Iron Man replacing Ghost Rider, they are the only heroes available to fight Thanos when he initially assembles the Infinity Gauntlet. Thanos still easily defeats the team until Wolverine cuts off Thanos's left arm, taking the Gauntlet with it. With Thanos powerless, Spider-Man uses the gauntlet to undo the events of Thanos's godhood.

== In other media ==
=== Television ===
- The Infinity Gauntlet, Infinity Gems, and an original weapon called the "Infinity Sword" appear in The Super Hero Squad Show. After Iron Man and Doctor Doom destroy the Infinity Sword while attempting to claim it, the first season of the series sees the eponymous squad collecting the sword's fragments, or "Infinity Fractals", before Doctor Doom's Lethal Legion can. While Doom rebuilds the Infinity Sword, the Silver Surfer tells him that it is useless without the Infinity Gauntlet before taking the sword out to space. The second season sees Thanos attempting to collect the Infinity Gems for his Infinity Gauntlet until the Silver Surfer, corrupted into the Dark Surfer by the sword, steals the completed gauntlet from him. After the Super Hero Squad defeat the Dark Surfer, the gems and sword are destroyed, recreating the Infinity Fractals.
- The Cosmic Cube appears in The Avengers: Earth's Mightiest Heroes. In the episode "Everything is Wonderful", Advanced Idea Mechanics creates it for Hydra, though the former group's leader MODOK secretly intends to swindle the latter. Upon discovering the cube's potential for their plans however, A.I.M. returns Hydra's money and claims the project was a failure so they can use the cube for themselves. However, Hydra leader Baron Strucker sees through MODOK's deception and a battle ensues between the two groups for possession of the cube in the subsequent episode "Hail Hydra". As a result, the Avengers intervene, defeat both groups, and claim the cube. Amidst the battle, Captain America obtains the cube and unconsciously uses its power to revive Bucky Barnes.
- The Infinity Gauntlet, five of the Infinity Stones, and the Cosmic Cube (referred to as the Tesseract) appear in Avengers Assemble. This version of the Infinity Gauntlet has slots for five of the stones as the Soul Stone was in Adam Warlock's possession and Thanos feared him.
- The Soul Stone appears in Guardians of the Galaxy.
- The Power Stone appears in the Marvel Future Avengers episode "Mission Black Market Auction". This version was originally kept within Asgard before it was stolen and taken to a black market on Earth.

=== Film ===
The Infinity Stones appear in Lego Marvel Super Heroes - Guardians of the Galaxy: The Thanos Threat. Additionally, a seventh Infinity Stone, the red Build Stone, which grants the power to build virtually anything, appears as well.

=== Marvel Cinematic Universe ===
The Infinity Gems, renamed Infinity Stones, play important roles in the first three phases of the Marvel Cinematic Universe (MCU), referred to collectively as the "Infinity Saga". The Infinity Stones also make minor appearances in the Phase Four television series Loki, WandaVision, and What If...?.

=== Video games ===
- The Infinity Gems appear in Marvel Super Heroes.
- The Infinity Gems appear in Marvel Super Heroes in War of the Gems.
- The Power, Soul, Reality, and Space Gems appear in Marvel vs. Capcom 2: New Age of Heroes.
- The Infinity Gems and Infinity Sword appear in Marvel Super Hero Squad: The Infinity Gauntlet. Additionally, Loki creates a fake seventh Infinity Gem, the pink "Rhythm Gem", for his and the Enchantress' use.
- The MCU incarnation of the Tesseract appears in Lego Marvel Super Heroes. Originally kept in Odin's vault on Asgard, it is stolen by Loki, who is defeated by Captain America, Thor, Wolverine, and the Human Torch. While the others are arguing over what they should do with the Tesseract, Wolverine grabs it and brings it to the X-Mansion in the hopes that Professor X can use it to locate Magneto. However, it is stolen by Magneto during the Brotherhood of Mutants' attack on the mansion and given to Doctor Doom, who uses it to power a ray gun to defeat Galactus before the latter destroys the Earth so that Doom can conquer it. Following Doom's defeat, Loki reveals that the ray gun is actually a mind control device, which he uses on Galactus in an attempt to destroy both Earth and Asgard. However, he is foiled by an alliance of heroes and villains who send Loki and Galactus through a wormhole. In the process, Thor destroys Loki's mind control device and the Tesseract is claimed by S.H.I.E.L.D. for safeguarding.
- The Infinity Stones and Infinity Gauntlet make a cameo appearance in Lego Marvel's Avengers.
- The Infinity Stones and Infinity Gauntlet appear in Fortnite Battle Royale.
- The Infinity Stones appear in Marvel vs. Capcom: Infinite. Players can equip one of the Infinity Stones at the start of a battle, which can be used to perform an "Infinity Surge" technique at any time or a limited "Infinity Storm" ability that gives the character a temporary power-up; the effects vary by the chosen stone.
- The Infinity Stones and a suit of "Infinity Armor", of which the Infinity Gauntlet is a part of, appear in Marvel Ultimate Alliance 3: The Black Order. These versions of the Stones and the Armor came into existence at the Heart of Infinity near the center of the universe. Additionally, using them together will make the user unstable and cause them to progressively kill themselves and all life in the universe.
- The Cosmic Cube appears in Marvel's Avengers. This version is a containment device, codenamed "Project Omega", built by Monica Rappaccini of A.I.M. to prevent a future Kree invasion of Earth.

=== Miscellaneous ===
- A flawed Cosmic Cube appears in Steven A. Roman's Chaos Engine novel series, with the object passing between Doctor Doom, Magneto, and the Red Skull. As each of them use it to create his own unique version of a perfect world, a team of X-Men who were operating outside of their reality when the initial change occurred work to stop them. They eventually realize that the cube "superimposes" another alternate reality over the X-Men's world of origin, temporarily merging them with their counterparts while draining the wish-maker's life energy. The crisis concludes when one of the Red Skull's lieutenants, who joined the Skull's group unaware of the scale of his evil, sacrifices himself to use the Cube to restore everything to normal.
- The Cosmic Cube appears in Marvel Universe Live!. This version is said to have the ability to corrupt any who attempt to use it. As such, Thor attempts to destroy it with Mjolnir. However, Loki uses a fragment of the cube to duplicate it for his own use, forcing the Avengers to retrieve the other fragments from Hydra, A.I.M., and the Sinister Six to stop him.
- From January to August 2012, WizKids presented the Infinity Gauntlet program at stores that host HeroClix tournaments. An Infinity Gauntlet prop was released, followed by a different Gem each month, each of which can be added to the Gauntlet to increase its power. Additionally, the Gems can be displayed on a stand that comes with the Gauntlet or on each Elder that Thanos encountered in the story Thanos Quest.
- Replica Infinity Gauntlets were given out as trophies at Ultimate Fighting Game Tournament 8, a Road to Evo tournament held in 2012.
