= Gamora =

Marvel Comics fictional character

- Textless variant cover of Guardians of the Galaxy vol. 6 #1 (January 2020). Art by Shannon Maer.

Publication information
- Publisher: Marvel Comics
- First appearance: Strange Tales #180 (June 1975)
- Created by: Jim Starlin

In-story information
- Full name: Gamora Zen Whoberi Ben Titan
- Species: Zen-Whoberian mutate
- Team affiliations: Guardians of the Galaxy; Infinity Watch; Phalanx; Graces; United Front; Nova Corps
- Partnerships: Peter Quill (Star-Lord)
- Notable aliases: Requiem; Most Dangerous Woman in the Universe; The Deadliest Woman In The Universe; Bambi Long
- Abilities: Superhuman strength, speed, agility, durability, and reflexes; Regenerative healing factor; Master martial artist and hand-to-hand combatant; Highly skilled markswoman and swordsman; Expert assassin

Gamora (Note: /ˈɡæmərə/ or /ɡəˈmɔːrə/) is a character appearing in American comic books published by Marvel Comics. Created by writer/artist Jim Starlin, the character first appeared in Strange Tales #180 (June 1975). Gamora is the adopted daughter of Thanos and the last of her species. Her powers include superhuman strength and agility and an accelerated healing factor. She also is an elite combatant, being able to beat most of the opponents in the galaxy. She is a member of the superhero group known as the Infinity Watch. The character played a role in the 2007 crossover storyline "Annihilation: Conquest", becoming a member of the titular team in its spin-off comic, Guardians of the Galaxy, before becoming the supervillain Requiem in the 2018 crossover storylines "Infinity Countdown" and "Infinity Wars".

Gamora has been featured in a variety of associated Marvel merchandise. Zoe Saldaña played the character in the Marvel Cinematic Universe films Guardians of the Galaxy (2014), Guardians of the Galaxy Vol. 2 (2017), and Avengers: Infinity War (2018), additionally portraying a version of the character from an alternate timeline in Avengers: Endgame (2019) and Guardians of the Galaxy Vol. 3 (2023). Ariana Greenblatt portrayed a young Gamora in Avengers: Infinity War.

== Creation ==
Jim Starlin commented on the character's creation stating, "She's the straight man for the Pips and the Draxes and the what have you, which doesn't make her the most interesting character, but makes her essential to get the rest of the story moving. So I always treated her as such. I had one story in particular, one Infinity Watch story, where she tries to show everyone how much of an adult she is by dealing with these U.N. soldiers who eventually piss her off, and she wrecks everything, disproving her point entirely. But most of the time she's the solid one, the one that brings everyone back to the reality they should be at. I've always used her as a supporting character. She was created as a supporting character. I have a limit on how much work I can do, so I never shot off on thinking about solo adventures with her. Even when she wasn't in a group, she was always a supporting character for Adam Warlock. I'm sure I could find those hooks that would make a solo story, I've just never done it. She probably works either way, but I've only ever used her one way."

== Publication history ==
The character debuted in Strange Tales #180 (1975), and was created by Jim Starlin. She returned in issue #181, Warlock #9, 10, 11 and 15 (1975-1976), and in the 1977 annuals for The Avengers and Marvel Two-in-One. In 1990, she returned in Silver Surfer vol. 3 #46-47. She had a minor role in The Infinity Gauntlet #1-6 (1991) and co-starred in Warlock and the Infinity Watch #1-42 (1992-1995). She was also featured in the Infinity War (1992) and Infinity Crusade (1993) crossovers. After appearing in Infinity Abyss #1-6 (2002), Annihilation: Ronan #1-4 (2006), Annihilation #1-6 (2006), Annihilation: Conquest #6 (2008) and Nova vol. 4 #4-12 (2007-2008), Gamora costarred in Guardians of the Galaxy vol. 2 #1-25 (2008-2010). She played a minor role in The Thanos Imperative #1-6 (2010).

The character, along with the other Guardians, appears in Avengers Assemble issues #4-8 (2012). She stars in Guardians of the Galaxy vol. 3, a part of the Marvel NOW! relaunch, and in Guardians of the Galaxy vol. 4. Parts of her origin story were told in a 2017 series titled Gamora that lasted five issues and were collected into the graphic novel Gamora: Memento Mori (2017). While being set on Earth-616, it retcons some elements of the established continuity to match the film version.

== Fictional character biography ==
Gamora is the last of her species, the Zen-Whoberis, who were exterminated by the Badoon (in her original timeline, her species was exterminated by the Universal Church of Truth). Thanos found her as a child and decided to use her as a weapon. Gamora was raised and trained by Thanos to assassinate the Magus, the evil, future version of Adam Warlock. Thanos showed her little kindness during her childhood, but Gamora was very loyal to the man who promised her the opportunity to avenge the death of her family. Gamora became very proficient in martial arts, earning the nickname "The deadliest woman in the whole galaxy". When she was a teenager, Thanos took her on a trip to Tartoonla #7. Gamora disobeyed Thanos's orders, and due to this, came into conflict with a group of thugs. She was greatly outnumbered, and despite her skills, she was defeated and then raped by the assailants. Thanos found her half dead, and in turn, murdered all of her assailants and restored her to health, cybernetically enhancing her to superhuman levels.

As an adult, Gamora was sent as an assassin against the Universal Church of Truth, quickly becoming feared by its agents, the Black Knights. She exacted revenge for the genocide of her race by killing every member of the church involved before the event occurred. Gamora met and teamed up with Adam Warlock, who wanted to stop his future, evil self. She even managed to get close to the Magus but failed her assassination in the last second. Together with Warlock, Pip the Troll and Thanos, Gamora fought to escape the Black Knights of the Universal Church of Truth and Magus's Death Squad. She was then assigned by Thanos to protect Warlock, but she became suspicious of Thanos's plans, and was then attacked by Drax the Destroyer.

Eventually the Magus was defeated, but Thanos revealed himself as a greater threat. Gamora aided Mar-Vell, Drax, and the Avengers against Thanos. Gamora and Pip tried to prevent Thanos from destroying half of all the life in the universe. Gamora attempted to slay Thanos, but he mortally wounded her, and destroyed Pip's mind. Adam Warlock found them, and Gamora warned Adam of Thanos's plans, and Adam absorbed their souls into his Soul Gem. When Warlock died as well, his spirit reunited with his friends in the world within the Soul Gem.

=== Infinity Watch ===
Gamora (upper right) on the cover of Warlock and the Infinity Watch #8 (September 1992), with Thanos and Moondragon. Art by Tom Raney and Terry Austin.

Inside the Soul Gem was Soul World, a place where Gamora, Pip and eventually Adam Warlock himself lived at peace. Other beings who had been absorbed by the Soul Gem, such as Kray-Tor and Autolycus, also lived in peace with former enemies.

Gamora met the Silver Surfer when he traveled to Soul World, and also battled Drax the Destroyer.

When Thanos managed to obtain all the Infinity Gems, forming the Infinity Gauntlet, Adam Warlock decided that he must be stopped. Warlock led Gamora and Pip the Troll out of Soul World into the real world. Their souls took over the bodies of three humans, who had recently died in a car crash. Gamora thus returned to the corporeal world by taking possession of the body of Bambi Long, whose body then began transforming into a duplicate of Gamora's original body. However, Gamora was soon erased from existence by Thanos when he erased half the population in the universe. When Nebula claimed the Gauntlet from Thanos, Gamora returned to existence.

Warlock now had the Infinity Gauntlet, giving him near omnipotence. Gamora and Pip persuaded Doctor Strange to help them find and stop Warlock, who was going mad with power. The Living Tribunal intervened and Warlock divided the Infinity Gems among several guardians, known as the Infinity Watch. Gamora received the Time Gem, but was incapable of consciously using it, though it did give her sporadic precognitive dreams and visions. Gamora had become romantically interested in Adam, but Adam did not respond to her. In an argument over the Infinity Watch member Maxam, Gamora left the Infinity Watch and the Time Gem behind. She returned to work as a mercenary until Adam Warlock approached her again. They continued to travel together and eventually Adam reciprocated her love. Adam and Gamora remained in a pocket dimension to raise the cosmic being known as Atleza.

=== Annihilation ===
Gamora later reappears in the pages of Ronan, having left the company of Adam Warlock and settled on the world Godthab Omega as leader of a group of female warriors called The Graces, where her mind has been altered by Glorian. She is intent on re-establishing her reputation as the deadliest woman in the universe and now wields the Godslayer sword. At one point, she is seen reclining on a 'throne' made of corpses. She joins the United Front, using her skills to launch quick counterattacks against the Annihilation Wave. She engages in a sexual relationship with the United Front's leader, Nova.

During the Phalanx's invasion of the Kree home-world following the Annihilation War, Gamora is assimilated as a "select" of the hive mind. They dispatch her to apprehend Nova after he flees the planet. She is later freed by Nova and the Technarch Tyro, but left in severe distress, longing again for the sense of companionship brought by the Phalanx, and continuing to adopt her Phalanx mannerisms.

She joins the new Guardians of the Galaxy.

Gamora was taken prisoner by Magus when he faked the death of himself and several other Guardians. She was rescued by Star-Lord and played a minor role in the war with the "Cancerverse".

=== Infinity Wars ===
After experiencing reoccurring dreams concerning encounters with an older version of herself, Gamora realizes that a portion of her soul is trapped inside the Soul World. After obtaining the Infinity Gems, Gamora takes the name "Requiem" and kills Thanos before using the Gems to fuse every being in the universe in pairs to appease Devondra, a spider-like entity who lives in Soul World. Ultimately, Gamora is defeated and sent to another planet alongside a resurrected Magus, while the merged universe is preserved as a pocket dimension inside the Soul Gem.

== Powers and abilities ==
Gamora received treatments from Thanos that enhanced her speed, strength, agility, and durability to rival Adam Warlock. Thanos also helped her become a formidable hand-to-hand combatant, trained in the martial-arts techniques from various planets, in the uses of the known weaponry of the Milky Way galaxy, and stealth techniques. She is also a highly skilled gymnast and assassin, and formerly possessed a telepathic link to Thanos. She uses a wide variety of weaponry, most notably a dagger whose unknown properties made it capable of killing even beings of such immense power as Thanos and the Magus.

In the pages of Infinity Watch, it is revealed that Gamora had been cybernetically enhanced to have superhuman strength, speed, and a rapid-healing ability. Gamora's strength and speed were further enhanced by Adam Warlock when they returned from Soulworld.

Gamora possesses a regenerative healing factor, allowing her to recover more quickly.

Gamora is one of the most skilled martial artists in the Marvel Universe. She is capable of defeating opponents who possess superhuman strength and durability that far surpass her own, and she has defeated a military platoon containing dozens of combat-trained men in only a few minutes. She has learned to paralyze or kill opponents using vital-point strikes directed at certain nerve clusters. Although skilled in the use of most conventional weapons, she prefers to use knives and swords.

While Gamora was with the Infinity Watch, she possessed the Infinity Gem called the "Time Gem". The gem was mentally linked to her, giving her the potential power to control time. She said that she did not know how to employ its powers and preferred not to use it. While she possessed the Time Gem, Gamora was prone to precognitive dreams and visions, though she had no conscious control over them. Later, despite no longer possessing the gem, she was claimed to retain some measure of this capability at the time of the Phalanx conquest.

== Reception ==
=== Accolades ===
- In 2018, Comic Book Resources (CBR) ranked Gamora 18th in their "25 Most Powerful Guardians Of The Galaxy" list and 19th in their "20 Guardians Of The Galaxy Members Ranked From Weakest To Strongest" list.
- In 2019, Daily Mirror ranked Gamora 13th in their "Best female superheroes of all time" list.
- In 2019, CBR ranked Gamora 1st in their "10 Daughters Of Marvel Supervillains That Are More Dangerous Than Their Parents" list.
- In 2020, Scary Mommy ranked Gamora 3rd in their "Looking For A Role Model? These 195+ Marvel Female Characters Are Truly Heroic" list.
- In 2020, CBR ranked Gamora 2nd in their "15 Strongest Swordfighters In Marvel Comics" list
- In 2021, CBR ranked Gamora 18th in their "20 Strongest Female Superheroes" list.
- In 2022, The A.V. Club ranked Gamora 31st in their "100 best Marvel characters" list.
- In 2022, CBR ranked Gamora 5th in their "10 Best Cosmic Heroes in Marvel Comics" list.

== In other media ==
=== Television ===
Gamora as she appears in the animated series Guardians of the Galaxy.

- Gamora appears in Silver Surfer, voiced initially by Mary Long and later by Alison Sealy-Smith.
- Gamora appears in Ultimate Spider-Man, voiced by Nika Futterman. This version is a member of the Guardians of the Galaxy.
- Gamora appears in Avengers Assemble, voiced again by Nika Futterman in "Guardians and Spaceknights" and by Laura Bailey in "Widow's Run". This version is a member of the Guardians of the Galaxy.
- Gamora appears in Hulk and the Agents of S.M.A.S.H., voiced again by Nika Futterman. This version is a member of the Guardians of the Galaxy.
- Gamora appears in Marvel Disk Wars: The Avengers, voiced by Junko Kitanishi.
- Gamora appears in Guardians of the Galaxy, voiced by Vanessa Marshall. Similar to the MCU incarnation, this version is a member of the titular team whose race was previously slaughtered by Thanos. Gamora was taken in by Thanos before eventually rebelling to prevent him from obtaining the Cosmic Seed.
- Gamora appears in Lego Marvel Super Heroes - Guardians of the Galaxy: The Thanos Threat, voiced again by Vanessa Marshall. This version is a member of the titular team.

=== Marvel Cinematic Universe ===
Zoe Saldaña as Gamora in Avengers: Infinity War (2018).

Zoe Saldaña portrays Gamora in media set in the Marvel Cinematic Universe. She first appears in the live-action film Guardians of the Galaxy (2014), before making subsequent appearances in the live-action films Guardians of the Galaxy Vol. 2 (2017) and Avengers: Infinity War (2018). Furthermore, Saldaña also portrays an alternate timeline version of Gamora in the live-action film Avengers: Endgame (2019) and reprised the role in the 2023 film Guardians of the Galaxy Vol. 3. Additionally, Ariana Greenblatt portrays a young Gamora in Infinity War while Cynthia McWilliams voices an alternate timeline variant in the Disney+ animated series What If...?.

=== Video games ===
- Gamora appears as a playable character in Marvel Avengers Alliance.
- Two incarnations of Gamora appear as playable characters in Marvel Puzzle Quest.
- Gamora appears in Lego Marvel Super Heroes, voiced by Danielle Nicolet.
- Gamora appears as a playable character in Disney Infinity 2.0, voiced again by Nika Futterman.
- Gamora appears as a playable character in Marvel Contest of Champions.
- Gamora appears as a playable character in Marvel: Future Fight.
- Gamora appears as a playable character in Disney Infinity 3.0, voiced again by Nika Futterman.
- Gamora appears in Guardians of the Galaxy: The Telltale Series, voiced by Emily O'Brien.
- Gamora appears as a playable character in Marvel vs. Capcom: Infinite, voiced again by Vanessa Marshall.
- Gamora appears as a playable character in Marvel Strike Force.
- Gamora appears as a playable character in Marvel Powers United VR, voiced again by Vanessa Marshall.
- Gamora appears as a playable character in Marvel Ultimate Alliance 3: The Black Order, voiced again by Vanessa Marshall.
- Gamora appears in Marvel's Guardians of the Galaxy, voiced by Kimberly-Sue Murray.
- Gamora appears in Marvel Snap.

=== Merchandise ===
- Gamora received a figure in "The Classic Marvel Figurine Collection" in 2012.

== Collected editions ==
Title	Material Collected	Publication Date	ISBN
Gamora: Guardian of the Galaxy	Strange Tales (vol. 1) #180-181; Warlock (vol. 1) #9-11, #15; Avengers Annual (vol. 1) #7 and Marvel Two-In-One Annual #2	September 21, 2016	978-1302902179
Gamora: Memento Mori	Gamora #1-5	July 5, 2017	978-0785197829
