= Thanos =

Marvel Comics supervillain

- Thanos, as appeared on a variant cover of Death of the Silver Surfer #3 (August 2025); Art by Dike Ruan

Publication information
- Publisher: Marvel Comics
- First appearance: The Invincible Iron Man #55 (February 1973)
- Created by: Jim Starlin; Mike Friedrich

In-story information
- Species: Eternal–Deviant hybrid
- Place of origin: Titan
- Team affiliations: Infinity Watch; Black Order
- Notable aliases: The Mad Titan
- Abilities: Superhuman strength, speed, stamina, durability, and agility; Access to nearly all powerful mystical artifacts and weapons; Superhuman physiology of Eternals; Skilled hand-to-hand combatant; Plasma energy projection; Genius-level intellect; Nigh-invulnerability; Master tactician

Thanos (/ˈθænɒs/) is a character appearing in American comic books published by Marvel Comics. Created by writer-artist Jim Starlin, the character first appeared in The Invincible Iron Man #55 (cover date February 1973). An Eternal–Deviant warlord from the moon Titan, Thanos is regarded as one of the most powerful beings in the Marvel Universe. Due to his genocidal tendencies, he has clashed with many heroes including the Avengers, the X-Men, the Fantastic Four, and the Guardians of the Galaxy.

In creating Thanos, Starlin drew inspiration from Jack Kirby's New Gods series for DC Comics, particularly the character of Darkseid. Thanos is usually portrayed as a villain, although many stories depict him as believing his actions to be justified. Perhaps the character's best-known storyline is The Infinity Gauntlet (1991), the culmination of several story arcs that see him gather the six Infinity Gems and use them to kill half of the universe's population, including many of its heroes, to woo Mistress Death, the living embodiment of death in the Marvel Universe. Although these events were later undone, the storyline has remained one of the most popular published by Marvel.

Debuting in the Bronze Age of comic books, the character has appeared in more than five decades of Marvel publications, as well as many media adaptations, including animated television series and video games.

In the Marvel Cinematic Universe, the character was first played by Damion Poitier in the film The Avengers (2012) and then by Josh Brolin in Guardians of the Galaxy (2014), Avengers: Age of Ultron (2015), Avengers: Infinity War (2018), Avengers: Endgame (2019), and the first season of the animated series What If...? (2021).

== Creation ==
Writer-artist Jim Starlin conceived of Thanos of Titan during college psychology classes and was inspired by Sigmund Freud's concept of human death drive, or Thanatos. As Starlin described:

I went to college between doing U.S. military service and getting work in comics, and there was a psych class and I came up with Thanos… and Drax the Destroyer, but I'm not sure how he fit into it, just anger management probably. So I came up to Marvel, and editor Roy Thomas asked if I wanted to do an issue of Iron Man. I felt that this may be my only chance ever to do a character, not having the confidence that my career was going to last anything longer than a few weeks. So they got jammed into it. Thanos was a much thinner character and Roy suggested beefing him up, so he's beefed up quite a bit from his original sketches ... and later on I liked beefing him up so much that he continued to grow in size.

Starlin has admitted the character's look was influenced by Jack Kirby's Darkseid:

Kirby had done the New Gods, which I thought was terrific. He was over at DC at the time. I came up with some things that were inspired by that. You'd think that Thanos was inspired by Darkseid, but that was not the case when I showed up. In my first Thanos drawings, if he looked like anybody, it was Metron. I had all these different gods and things I wanted to do, which became Thanos and the Titans. Roy took one look at the guy in the Metron-like chair and said: "Beef him up! If you're going to steal one of the New Gods, at least rip off Darkseid, the really good one!"

== Publication history ==
Thanos debuted in The Invincible Iron Man #55 (February 1973), featuring a story by Jim Starlin that was co-scripted by Mike Friedrich. The storyline from that issue continued through Captain Marvel #25–33 (bi-monthly: March 1973 – Jan. 1974), Marvel Feature #12 (Nov. 1973), Daredevil #107 (Jan. 1974), and Avengers #125 (July 1974). He returned in an extended storyline that spanned Strange Tales #178–181 (Feb.–Aug. 1975), Warlock #9-11 (Oct. 1975 – Jan. 1976), Marvel Team Up #55 (March 1977), and the 1977 Annuals for Avengers and Marvel Two-in-One (Thanos does not actually appear until the end of Warlock #9). He was also featured in a short backup story in Logan's Run #6 (June 1977) and had a small role in the graphic novel The Death of Captain Marvel (April 1982).

The character was revived in Silver Surfer vol. 3, #34 (Feb. 1990) and guest-starred until issue #59 (November 1991), while simultaneously appearing in The Thanos Quest #1–2 (Sept. – Oct. 1990) and The Infinity Gauntlet #1–6 (July – Dec. 1991). After an appearance in Spider-Man #17 (Dec. 1991), Thanos had a recurring role in Warlock and the Infinity Watch #1–42 (Feb. 1992 – Aug. 1995). This was followed by crossover appearances in Infinity War #1–6 (June – Nov. 1992), Infinity Crusade #1–6 (June – Nov. 1993), Silver Surfer vol. 3, #86–88 (Nov. 1993 – Jan. 1994), Warlock Chronicles #6–8, Thor #468–471 (Nov. 1993 – Feb. 1994), Namor The Sub-Mariner #44 (Nov. 1993), Secret Defenders #11–14 (Jan. – April 1994), Cosmic Powers #1–6 (March – July 1994), and Cosmic Powers Unlimited #1 (May 1995).

Thanos appeared in a connected storyline in Ka-Zar vol. 2, #4–11 (Aug. 1997 – March 1998), Ka-Zar Annual (1997), and the X-Man and Hulk Annual (1998), before featuring in Thor vol. 2, #21–25 (March – July 2000) and the 2000 Annual. The character was next used in Captain Marvel vol. 4, #17–19 (June–Aug. 2001), Avengers: Celestial Quest #1–8 (Nov. 2001 – June 2002), Infinity Abyss #1–6 (Aug. – Oct. 2002) and Marvel: The End #1–6 (May – Aug 2003).

In 2004 Thanos received an eponymous title that ran for 12 issues. In 2006, the character played an important role in Annihilation: Silver Surfer #1–4 (June – Sept. 2006) and Annihilation #1–6 (Oct. 2006 – March 2007). The character was re-introduced in Guardians of the Galaxy vol. 2, #24–25 (April – May 2010) and played a major role in The Thanos Imperative: Ignition (June 2010) and The Thanos Imperative #1–6 (July – Dec. 2010).

The character returned in Avengers Assemble #1 (March 2012). A mini-series titled Thanos: Son of Titan by Joe Keatinge was planned for publication in August 2012, but was cancelled.

The character's origin was expanded in the five-issue Thanos Rising miniseries by Jason Aaron and Simone Bianchi which was published monthly beginning in April 2013. Later that same year, Thanos played a central role in the Infinity miniseries written by Jonathan Hickman and drawn by Jim Cheung, Jerome Opeña, and Dustin Weaver.

In May 2014, Jim Starlin and Ron Lim worked together on the one-shot Thanos Annual, which is a prelude to a new trilogy of original graphic novels. The first, Thanos: The Infinity Revelation, was released the following August. Beginning in February 2015, Starlin also penned a four-issue miniseries titled Thanos vs. Hulk, which was set prior to the graphic novels. The second installment in the trilogy, Thanos: The Infinity Relativity, was released in June 2015. The third graphic novel, Thanos: The Infinity Finale, as well as the connected mini-series The Infinity Entity were published in 2016.

At the same time Starlin was writing these graphic novels and tie-ins, the character also appeared in New Avengers #23–24 (Oct – Nov 2014), Guardians of the Galaxy vol. 3, #18–20 (Oct – Dec 2014), Legendary Star-Lord #4 (Dec 2014), a six-issue miniseries titled Thanos: A God Up There Listening (Dec 2014), Avengers vol. 5, #40–41 (Mar – Apr 2015), and Deadpool vol. 3, #45 ("#250") (Jun 2015). Thanos also played a major role in the five-issue miniseries The Infinity Gauntlet vol. 2, (July 2015 – Jan 2016), a tie-in of the cross-over Secret Wars (2015).

In 2017, as part of Marvel NOW!, Thanos received his own solo title written by Jeff Lemire and drawn by Mike Deodato. After 11 issues, Donny Cates and Geoff Shaw took over as the creative team. This storyline crossed over with Cates' Cosmic Ghost Rider storyline.

In 2021, Thanos was later reintroduced as a primary antagonist in the comic series Eternals vol. 5, #1–12, by the writer Kieron Gillen and artist Esad Ribić, and plays a prominent role in exploring the Eternals mythos.

== Fictional character biography ==
Thanos was born on Saturn's moon Titan as the son of Eternals A'lars and Sui-San, the grandson of Kronos, the nephew of Zuras, and the grandnephew of Oceanus and Uranos. His brother is Eros of Titan. Thanos carries the Deviant gene, and as such, shares the physical appearance of the Eternals' cousin race. Shocked by his appearance and the belief that he would destroy all life in the universe, Sui-San went insane and attempted to kill him, but she was stopped by A'lars. During his school years, Thanos was a pacifist and would only play with his brother Eros and pets. By adolescence, Thanos had become fascinated with nihilism and entropy, worshipping and eventually falling in love with the physical embodiment of Mistress Death.

As an adult, Thanos augmented his physical strength and powers through his superior scientific knowledge using a combination of mysticism and cybernetic enhancements. He also attempted to create a new life for himself by siring many children as well as becoming a pirate. He finds no fulfillment in either until he is visited again by Death, for whom he murders his offspring and his pirate captain.

Wishing to impress Death, Thanos gathers an army of villainous aliens and begins a nuclear bombardment of Titan that kills millions of his race. Seeking universal power in the form of the Cosmic Cube, Thanos travels to Earth. Prior to landing, his vessel destroys a nearby car as a family witnesses his arrival. Unbeknownst to Thanos, two of the family members in the vehicle survive: the spirit of the father, Arthur, is preserved by the Titanian cosmic entity Kronos and is given a new form as Drax the Destroyer while the daughter, Heather, is found by Thanos's father, Mentor, and is raised to become the heroine Moondragon. Thanos eventually locates the Cube, and also attracts the attention of Death. Willing the Cube to make him omnipotent, Thanos then discards the Cube. He imprisons Kronos and taunts Kree hero Captain Marvel (Mar-Vell), who is eventually able to defeat Thanos by destroying the Cube.

Thanos later comes to the aid of Adam Warlock in a war against the Magus and his religious empire. During the process, he ends up adopting Gamora to use her as his assassin and kill Warlock before becoming Magus. During this alliance, Thanos secretly siphons the Soul Gem's energy and combines the Infinity Gems to build a star-destroying weapon for Death. Warlock summons the Avengers and Captain Marvel to stop Thanos, although the plan is foiled when Thanos kills Warlock. The Titan regroups and captures the heroes, who are freed by Spider-Man and the Thing. Thanos is finally stopped by Warlock, whose spirit emerges from the Soul Gem and turns the Titan to stone. Thanos's spirit eventually reappears to accompany a dying Captain Marvel's soul into the realm of Death.

During the "Infinity Saga" storyline, Thanos is eventually resurrected and collects the Infinity Gems once again. He uses the gems to create the Infinity Gauntlet, making himself omnipotent, and erases half the living things in the universe to prove his love to Death. This act and several other acts are soon undone by Nebula and Adam Warlock. Warlock reveals that Thanos has always allowed himself to be defeated because the Titan secretly knows he is not worthy of ultimate power. Thanos joins Warlock as part of the Infinity Watch and helps him to defeat first his evil and then good personas, and cure Thor of "warrior Madness".

Thanos uses the heroes Thor and Genis-Vell (Captain Marvel's son) against the death god Walker, who attempts to woo Death and then destroy the entity after being rejected. Thanos then devises a plan to become the All-Father of a new pantheon of gods created by himself. Thanos, however, finds himself opposed by the Avengers' former member Mantis and her son Quoi, who apparently is destined to be the Celestial Messiah. Thanos abandons this plan after having to unite with Death to destroy the "Rot", a cosmic aberration in deep space caused by Thanos's incessant love for Death. Thanos also once conducted extensive research on genetics, studying many of the universe's heroes and villains before cloning them, and gene-spliced his own DNA into the subjects. Although he later abandons the project, five clones survive, being versions of Professor X, Iron Man, Gladiator, Doctor Strange, and Galactus respectively. A sixth and unnamed version of Thanos also appears, and it is revealed the incarnations of Thanos encountered in the past by Thor and Ka-Zar were actually clones. The true Thanos – with the aid of Adam Warlock, Gamora, Pip the Troll, Spider-Man, Captain Marvel, and Strange – destroys the remaining clones.

When the ancient Egyptian pharaoh Akhenaten uses a source of cosmic power, the Heart of the Universe, to seize power in present-day Earth (killing most of Earth's heroes in the process), Thanos uses a time-travel stratagem to defeat him. Thanos then uses the Heart of the Universe to reverse Akhenaten's actions and was also compelled to correct a flaw in the universe, for which Death kisses him, and speaks to him for the first time. Changed by the experience, Thanos advises confidant Adam Warlock he will no longer seek universal conquest.

Thanos decides to atone for the destruction of Rigel-3, and agrees to aid a colony of Rigellians in evacuating their planet before Galactus can consume it. During the course of this mission Thanos learns Galactus is collecting the Infinity Gems in an effort to end his unyielding hunger. Thanos later learns Galactus is being manipulated into releasing a multiversal threat called Hunger, which feeds on entire universes. Despite opposition from Thanos, Galactus unwittingly frees the entity, and when its intentions are revealed, the pair team up and attempt to destroy it.

En route to the Kyln, an intergalactic prison, Thanos meets Death for the first time since re-building existence with the Heart of the Universe. Death claims to be worth wooing, but says Thanos must offer something other than death. At the Kyln, Thanos encounters Peter Quill, who has retired himself from the role of Star-Lord, and Gladiator of the Shi'ar empire, who are both prisoners, as well as the Beyonder, who has been rendered amnesiac by its choice to assume a humanoid female form. Thanos battles the Beyonder, causing its mind to shut down and leaving its power trapped within a comatose physical form. Thanos then instructs the Kyln officers to keep the Beyonder on life support indefinitely to prevent the entity from being reborn. The destruction frees Thanos and his fellow inmates, and he finds himself accompanied by the chaos-mite Skreet in his plans to leave the remains of the prison. He discovers, however, that the destruction wrought by the battle with the Beyonder has freed the last prisoner brought in by Peter Quill before he gave up the title of Star-Lord: the Fallen One, revealed to be the true first Herald of Galactus, who had been held in a container deep in the Kyln. Thanos defeats the former Herald and places him under complete mental control.

During the Annihilation War, Thanos allies with the genocidal villain Annihilus. When the Annihilation Wave destroys the Kyln, Thanos sends the Fallen to check on the status of the Beyonder, whose mortal form has been destroyed. Before the Fallen can report back to Thanos it encounters Tenebrous and Aegis: two of Galactus's ancient foes. Thanos convinces Tenebrous and Aegis to join the Annihilation Wave to get revenge on Galactus, and they subsequently defeat the World Devourer and the Silver Surfer. Annihilus desires the secret of the Power Cosmic and asks Thanos to study Galactus. Once Thanos learns Annihilus's true goal is to use the Power Cosmic to destroy all life and remain the sole survivor, he decides to free Galactus. Drax the Destroyer kills Thanos before he can do so.

During "The Thanos Imperative" storyline, Thanos is chosen by Oblivion to be the new Avatar of Death. Resurrected before his mind can be fully formed, Thanos goes on a mindless rampage before being captured by the Guardians of the Galaxy. Thanos pretends to aid the Guardians against the invading Cancerverse, and after discovering its origin kills an alternate version of Mar-Vell, the self-proclaimed Avatar of Life. This causes the collapse of the Cancerverse, and Nova sacrifices himself in an attempt to contain Thanos inside the imploding reality. Thanos escapes and returns to Earth seeking an artificial cosmic cube. He forms an incarnation of the criminal group Zodiac to retrieve it, but he is defeated by the Avengers and the Guardians of the Galaxy and remanded to the custody of the Elders of the Universe.

During the "Infinity" storyline, Thanos soon invades Earth again after being informed that most of the Avengers have temporarily left the planet. He launches an assault on Attilan, which he offers to spare in exchange for the deaths of all Inhumans between the ages of 16 and 22. Black Bolt later informs the Illuminati that the true purpose of the invasion is to find and kill Thane, an Eternal/Inhuman hybrid who Thanos had secretly fathered years earlier.

Investigating a temporal anomaly on Titan during "The Infinity Conflict", Thanos finds Pip the Troll and an older Eros who has come from the future. Eros tells him about an enemy made out darkness that will destroy Thanos in the future. Eros and Thanos craft a plan, but when they go to implement it Thanos is confronted by his future self who tells him to alter the plan to ensure his safety. The future Thanos then takes control of the past Thanos' body. Under the control of his future self, Thanos began searching through ancient temples and sites to find something that would allow him to eventually become like his future. Through his journey he was also forced to kill Adam Warlock who might interfere with his future's plan. After being unable to locate Eros, his future self tells Thanos that Eros was extremely important to his cosmic masterwork. Then after locating a moving comet Thanos goes to the comet which contained a treasure more powerful than the Infinity Gems. Despite the speed of comet being enough to immediately vaporize any being Thanos was able to get it since he "existed outside the norm". With this artifact Thanos was able to absorb every cosmic being that exists in his universe, eventually facing Eternity and Infinity. Despite their best effort Thanos defeats them and absorbs the two beings. He then merges with his future self finally taking the battle to the Living Tribunal and the One Above All.

Facing the One Above All and the Living Tribunal, Thanos' future self absorbs both of them, becoming the entirety of the multiverse. As the multiverse began dying, while his future self searched for Eros, present Thanos was locked away within his future's psyche not allowed to interfere. In a desperate ditch effort to prevent all of this Eros, alongside Pip, travel to different points of Thanos' past and tell him he is not alone and that he is loved. However, it is all in vain as Thanos simply did not care, but these temporal paradoxes did allow present Thanos to use that little access of his future's power to talk to Eros through his past selves. He directs Eros and Pip to his future's psyche and had Eros free him, but unfortunately this allows future Thanos to finally find Eros and had him absorbed inside his universe. Then Adam Warlock came and refuses to free Thanos because he would end up as Eros and tells Thanos that trust would be the only thing that would stop future Thanos. As his future self saw that existence was just a never-endless cycle which trapped all beings decided to commit suicide and "free" everyone from this "torture". Thankfully, Kang prevented Eros from going to talk to Thanos' past selves which allowed him to avoid capture. This caused future Thanos to get distracted which allowed present Thanos to take control and reset everything prior to his future machinations, while erasing his future in the process.

When Thanos prepares to raid a Project Pegasus facility to steal a Cosmic Cube during the "Civil War II" storyline, he is ambushed and defeated by a team of Avengers who were tipped off by a vision from Ulysses Cain. During their battle, he mortally wounds War Machine and critically injures She-Hulk. Thanos goes on a killing spree, but Black Panther, Blue Marvel and Monica Rambeau are able to stop him by devising a device that blocks the electrical synapses in his brain.

Thanos recovers during the "Thanos Returns" story and escapes captivity, and reclaims his Black Order forces from Corvus Glaive. After retaking command of his Black Quadrant outpost, Thanos discovers that he is dying. Thanos tries to force his father, Mentor, to find a cure for his malady, but kills him when he is unable to. Soon after Thanos would be battered and detained by the Shi'ar Imperial Guard after he invaded the very planet station of his father's facility sitting in their territory. After escaping from prison, Thanos is found by Thane's betrayed cohorts Tryco Slatterus, Nebula, and Eros. Thanos ventures into the God Quarry to regain his powers, culminating in him embracing villainy and attacking Eros.

Some time after his battle with Thane, Thanos travels to the Chitauri homeworld. Defeated by the Rider, Thanos is taken millions of years into the future to meet his elderly, universe-destroying self. King Thanos reveals he needs his younger self's assistance to defeat the Fallen One, the last being left in the Universe, so that he may finally reunite with Death. The Fallen One soon arrives, revealed to be a darkened Silver Surfer. After the Surfer is killed, Death arrives, and Thanos realizes the true reason that King Thanos brought him into the future: so that King Thanos can finally die, reasoning that if he must die, it can only be at the hands of himself. At first, Thanos is more than happy to oblige his future counterpart's request, but quickly stops, disappointed at how pathetic and submissive his older self has become. Resolving to never become as pathetic and complacent as King Thanos has become, Thanos returns to the present day. Thanos's actions erase the future timeline from existence.

In a prelude to the "A.X.E.: Judgment Day" storyline, Thanos is revived by Druig and Phastos as their plan to remove Zuras from his leadership after learning the Machine's purpose for their resurrection. Druig places a device inside his body to prevent his treachery. After receiving a vote from the Uni-Mind, Thanos becomes the Prime Eternal and kills Zuras for revenge and Druig to hide his weakness.

In a prelude to the "Queen in Black" storyline, Thanos is called upon by Hela to target an escaped Knull. After Knull gained light powers from the Lightforce dimension, he is confronted by Thanos who had his body upgraded. Despite his upgrades, Thanos is impaled and killed by Knull.

== Powers and abilities ==
Thanos is a mutant member of the race of superhumans known as the Titanian Eternals. The character possesses abilities common to the Eternals, but amplified to a higher degree through a combination of his mutant–Eternal heritage, bionic amplification, mysticism, and power bestowed by the abstract entity, Death. Demonstrating enormous superhuman strength, speed, stamina, immortality and invulnerability among other qualities, Thanos can absorb and project vast quantities of cosmic energy, and is capable of telekinesis and telepathy. He can manipulate matter and live indefinitely without food, air or water, cannot die of old age, is immune to all terrestrial diseases, and has high resistance to psychic assaults. Thanos is also an accomplished hand-to-hand combatant, having been trained in the art of war on Titan.

Thanos has proven himself capable of briefly holding his own in battle against Odin, and of blasting Galactus off his feet.

Thanos is a supergenius in virtually all known fields of advanced science and has created technology far exceeding that which is found on contemporary Earth. Thanos is also a master strategist and uses several space vessels, at least three under the name "Sanctuary", as a base of operations.

=== Equipment ===
He often employs a transportation chair capable of space flight, force field projection, teleportation, time travel, and movement through alternate universes.

== Cultural impact and legacy ==
=== Critical response ===
George Marston of Newsarama ranked Thanos 1st in their "Best Marvel supervillains" list, while ranked him 6th in their "Best Marvel characters of all time" list. The A.V. Club ranked Thanos 6th in their "28 Best Marvel Villains" list. IGN ranked Thanos 6th in their "Top 25 Marvel Villains" list, and 47th in their "Top 100 Comic Book Villains" list. Rachel Ulatowski of The Mary Sue ranked Thanos 7th in their "Strongest Marvel Villains" list. Jason Serafino of Complex ranked Thanos 21st in their "25 Greatest Comic Book Villains of All Time" list.

Screen Rant included Thanos in their "20 Most Powerful Marvel Villains" list, and ranked him 8th in their "10 Most Powerful Members Of The Eternals" list, and 10th in their "25 Greatest Comic Book Supervillains Of All Time" list. Comic Book Resources ranked Thanos 1st in their "13 Most Important Marvel Villains" list, 2nd in their "10 Strongest Characters From Eternals Comics" list, and 2nd in their "15 Most Powerful Eternals" list.

=== Impact ===
In July 2018, the Reddit forum /r/ThanosDidNothingWrong, dedicated to sharing theories and memes about the character, went viral when it was announced that half of the forum's subscribers would be banned, mirroring Thanos' plan to eradicate half of all life in the universe. The number of subscribers rose from 100,000 users in June, to over 700,000 on July 9, leading to over 350,000 users being banned, the largest such banning in Reddit's history. JV Chamar of Forbes stated that "Thanos did nothing wrong" has become a popular internet meme, and that the film Endgame provides some evidence in favor of this view, in particular when Captain America says, "I saw a pod of whales when I was coming over the bridge ... There's fewer ships, cleaner water." The author notes that given the contemporary extinction crisis driven by human actions, "you could indeed argue that Thanos did nothing wrong — and in the long run, the villain might have actually saved the world."

== Other versions ==
Many alternate universe versions of Thanos have appeared throughout the character's publication history.

=== Amalgam Comics ===
Thanoseid, a composite character based on Thanos and DC Comics character Darkseid, appears in the Amalgam Comics universe.

=== Earth X ===
In Earth X, Thanos's mother was a Skrull, but he was deceived into believing that Death was his mother. After learning the truth, Thanos destroys Death using the Ultimate Nullifier.

=== Heroes Reborn (2021) ===
In the 2021 "Heroes Reborn" reality, there is a variant of Thanos who wields the Infinity Rings. He is defeated by Doctor Spectrum.

=== Kid Thanos ===
A young version of Thanos known as Kid Thanos is a member of the multiversal Masters of Evil.

=== Ultimate Marvel ===
In the Ultimate Marvel universe, Thanos is the ruler of Acheron and father of Ronan the Accuser.

== In other media ==
=== Television ===
- Thanos appears in Silver Surfer, voiced by Gary Krawford. Due to Fox's broadcast standards, this version is depicted as a worshiper of Lady Chaos.
- Thanos appears in The Super Hero Squad Show, voiced initially by Steve Blum and subsequently by Jim Cummings.
- Thanos appears in Avengers Assemble, voiced by Isaac C. Singleton Jr.
- Thanos appears in Guardians of the Galaxy, voiced again by Isaac C. Singleton Jr.
- Thanos appears in Lego Marvel Super Heroes – Guardians of the Galaxy: The Thanos Threat, voiced again by Isaac C. Singleton Jr.
- Thanos appears in Lego Marvel Super Heroes – Black Panther: Trouble in Wakanda, voiced again by Isaac C. Singleton Jr.
- Thanos appears in Marvel Battleworld: Mystery of the Thanostones, voiced by Deven Mack.
- Thanos appears in Marvel Battleworld: Treachery at Twilight, voiced again by Deven Mack.
- Thanos appears in Lego Marvel Avengers: Loki in Training, voiced again by Deven Mack.
- Thanos appears in Lego Marvel Avengers: Time Twisted, voiced again by Deven Mack.
- Thanos appears in The Simpsons, voiced by Maurice LaMarche.
- Thanos appears in Lego Marvel Avengers: Strange Tails, voiced by James C. Mathis III.

=== Marvel Cinematic Universe ===
Thanos appears in the first three phases of the Marvel Cinematic Universe's films, known collectively as the "Infinity Saga", primarily portrayed by Josh Brolin via motion capture. Alternate timeline versions of Thanos appear in the Disney+ animated series What If...?, with Brolin reprising the voice role.

=== Video games ===
- Thanos appears as a playable character in Marvel Super Heroes and Marvel vs. Capcom 2, voiced by Andrew Jackson.
- Thanos appears as the final boss in Marvel Super Heroes in War of the Gems.
- Thanos appears in Marvel Super Hero Squad: The Infinity Gauntlet, voiced by Jim Cummings.
- Thanos appears in Pinball FX2, voiced by Isaac C. Singleton Jr.
- Thanos appears in Marvel Pinball, voiced by Isaac C. Singleton Jr.
- Thanos appears in Marvel Super Hero Squad Online, voiced by Steve Blum.
- Thanos appears in Marvel Avengers Alliance.
- Thanos appears in Marvel vs. Capcom: Origins.
- Thanos appears in Zen Pinball 2.
- Thanos appears as a DLC character in Lego Marvel Super Heroes.
- Thanos appears in Marvel Heroes, voiced by Marc Worden.
- Three incarnations of Thanos appear as playable characters in Marvel Puzzle Quest. The first two, based on the comics ("Modern" and "The Mad Titan"), were added to the game in December 2016, while the third, inspired by the MCU incarnation ("Endgame"), was added in April 2019.
- Thanos appears in Disney Tsum Tsum.
- Thanos appears as a playable character in Marvel: Contest of Champions.
- The MCU incarnation of Thanos appears as a boss in the Spider-Man Unlimited Infinity War tie-in update, voiced by Kyle Hebert.
- Thanos appears in Marvel: Avengers Alliance 2.
- Thanos appears as a playable character in Marvel Future Fight.
- Thanos appears as a playable character of Lego Marvel's Avengers, voiced again by Isaac C. Singleton Jr.
- Thanos appears in Guardians of the Galaxy: The Telltale Series, voiced by Jake Hart. This version seeks an ancient artifact called the Eternity Forge, but is killed in battle by the Guardians of the Galaxy.
- The MCU incarnation of Thanos appears in Lego Marvel Super Heroes 2.
- Thanos appears as a playable character in Marvel vs. Capcom: Infinite, voiced again by Isaac C. Singleton Jr. He is captured by Ultron Sigma until he is rescued by an alliance of heroes from the Marvel and Capcom universes and aids them in devising a plan to combat Ultron Sigma.
- Thanos appears in Pinball FX3.
- Thanos appears in Angry Avengers: Knock Down.
- The MCU incarnation of Thanos appeared in Fortnite Battle Royale as part of Marvel-sponsored Avengers: Infinity War and Avengers: Endgame tie-in events, voiced by archive audio of Josh Brolin.
- Thanos appears in Marvel Battle Lines.
- Thanos appears in Marvel End Time Arena.
- Thanos appears in Marvel Powers United VR, voiced again by Isaac C. Singleton Jr.
- Thanos appears as a playable character in Marvel Strike Force.
- Thanos appears in Marvel Super War.
- Thanos appears in Marvel Ultimate Alliance 3: The Black Order, voiced again by Isaac C. Singleton Jr.
- Thanos appears in Marvel 5DX Legacy.
- Two versions of Thanos from different alternate realities appear in Marvel Future Revolution, voiced again by Isaac C. Singleton Jr.
- Thanos appears in Marvel's Guardians of the Galaxy, voiced by Akio Otsuka.
- Thanos appears in Marvel Snap.
- Thanos appears as a playable character in Marvel Cosmic Invasion, voiced again by Isaac S. Singleton Jr.

=== Novels ===
- Thanos appears in the 2017 novel, Thanos: Death Sentence by Stuart Moore. The book follows Thanos' last chance to win Death's love after his defeat at the end of The Infinity Gauntlet.
- Thanos appears in the 2018 novel Thanos: Titan Consumed, by Barry Lyga.

== Collected editions ==
A number of the stories featuring Thanos have been republished into trade paperbacks and other collected editions:

- The Life of Captain Marvel (collects Iron Man #55, Captain Marvel #25–34, Marvel Feature #12), 1991, ISBN 0-87135-635-X
- Essential Avengers: Volume 6 (includes Captain Marvel #33; The Avengers #125, 135), 576 pages, February 2008, ISBN 0-7851-3058-6
- The Greatest Battles of the Avengers (includes Avengers Annual #7), 156 pages, December 1993, ISBN 0-87135-981-2
- Avengers vs. Thanos (collects Iron-Man #55, Captain Marvel #25–33, Marvel Feature #12, Daredevil #105–107, Avengers #125, Warlock #9-11, 15, Avengers Annual #7, Marvel Two-In-One Annual #2, and material from Logan's Run #6), 472 pages, March 2013, ISBN 0-7851-6850-8
- Essential Marvel Two-in-One: Volume 2 (includes Marvel Two-in-One Annual #2), 568 pages, July 2007, ISBN 0-7851-2698-8
- Marvel Masterworks Captain Marvel: Volume 3 (collects Captain Marvel #22–33, Iron Man #55), 288 pages, hardcover, April 2008, ISBN 0-7851-3015-2
- Marvel Masterworks Captain Marvel: Volume 6 (collects Captain Marvel #58–62, Marvel Spotlight #1–4, 8, Marvel Super-Heroes #3, Marvel Graphic Novel #1; Logan's Run #63), 296 pages, hardcover, May 2016, ISBN 978-0785199946
- Marvel Masterworks Warlock: Volume 2 (collects Strange Tales #178–181; Warlock #9–15; Avengers Annual #7; Marvel Two-in-One Annual #2), hardcover, 320 pages, hardcover, June 2009, ISBN 0-7851-3511-1
- The Death of Captain Marvel (collects Captain Marvel #34, Marvel Spotlight #1–2, Marvel Graphic Novel #1), 128 pages, hardcover, June 2010, ISBN 0-7851-4627-X
- Silver Surfer: Rebirth of Thanos (collects Silver Surfer #34-38 and Yule Memory from Marvel Holiday Special 1992 by Jim Starlin, Ron Lim, Terry Austin), 128 pages, April 1993, ISBN 0-87135-968-5
- The Thanos Quest:
  - Volume 1 (The Thanos Quest) miniseries #1-3, 1990–1991 (caution, later printings of this edition have poor quality) ISBN 0-87135-681-3
  - Volume 2 (The Thanos Quest) miniseries #4-6, 1990–1991 (caution, later printings of this edition have poor quality) ISBN 0-87135-682-1
- Silver Surfer: Rebirth of Thanos (collects Silver Surfer #34–38; The Thanos Quest miniseries; "The Final Flower!" from Logan's Run #6), 224 pages, April 2006, ISBN 0-7851-2046-7 (hardcover, August 2010, ISBN 0-7851-4478-1)
- The Infinity Gauntlet (collects The Infinity Gauntlet limited series), 256 pages, March 2000, ISBN 0-87135-944-8 (December 2004, ISBN 0-7851-0892-0; July 2006, ISBN 0-7851-2349-0; hardcover, August 2010, ISBN 0-7851-4549-4)
- Infinity War (collects Infinity War limited series; Warlock and the Infinity Watch #7–10; Marvel Comics Presents #108–111), 400 pages, April 2006, ISBN 0-7851-2105-6
- Infinity Crusade:
  - Volume 1 (collects Infinity Crusade #1–3, Warlock Chronicles #1–3, Warlock and the Infinity Watch #18–19), 248 pages, December 2008, ISBN 0-7851-3127-2
  - Volume 2 (collects Infinity Crusade #4–6, Warlock Chronicles #4–5, Warlock and the Infinity Watch #20–22), 248 pages, February 2009, ISBN 0-7851-3128-0
- Thor: Blood and Thunder (collects Thor #468–471, Silver Surfer #86–88, Warlock Chronicles #6–8, Warlock and the Infinity Watch #23–25), 336 pages, July 2011, ISBN 978-0-7851-5094-7
- DC versus Marvel Comics (collects DC vs. Marvel mini-series, Doctor Strangefate #1), 163 pages, September 1996, ISBN 1-56389-294-4
- Ka-Zar by Mark Waid and Andy Kubert:
  - Volume 1 (collects Ka-Zar #1–7, Tales of the Marvel Universe #1), 208 pages, January 2011, ISBN 978-0-7851-4353-6
  - Volume 2 (collects Ka-Zar #8–14, Annual '97), 216 pages, March 2011, ISBN 978-0-7851-5992-6
- Deadpool Classic: Volume 5 (collects Deadpool #26–33, Baby's First Deadpool, Deadpool Team-Up #1), 272 pages, June 2011, ISBN 978-0-7851-5519-5
- The Mighty Thor by Dan Jurgens and John Romita Jr.: Volume 4 (collects Thor vol. 2, #18–25, Annual 2000), 256 pages, November 2010, ISBN 978-0-7851-4927-9
- Infinity Abyss (collects Infinity Abyss limited series), 176 pages, 2003, ISBN 0-7851-0985-4
- Thanos: The End (collects Marvel: The End limited series), 160 pages, May 2004, ISBN 0-7851-1116-6
- Thanos: Redemption (collects Thanos #1–12), 304 pages, November 2013, ISBN 0-7851-8506-2
  - Epiphany (collects Thanos Vol. 1 #1–6), 144 pages, June 2004, ISBN 0-7851-1355-X
  - Samaritan (collects Thanos Vol. 1 #7–12), 144 pages, October 2004, ISBN 0-7851-1540-4
- Annihilation:
  - Volume 1 (collects Drax the Destroyer miniseries, Annihilation: Prologue one-shot, Annihilation: Nova miniseries), 256 pages, October 2007, ISBN 0-7851-2901-4 (hardcover, March 2007, ISBN 0-7851-2511-6)
  - Volume 2 (collects Annihilation: Ronan miniseries, Annihilation: Silver Surfer miniseries, Annihilation: Super-Skrull miniseries), 320 pages, November 2007, ISBN 0-7851-2902-2 (hardcover, May 2007, ISBN 0-7851-2512-4)
  - Volume 3 (collects Annihilation: The Nova Corps Files one-shot/handbook, Annihilation limited series, Annihilation: Heralds of Galactus miniseries), 304 pages, December 2007, ISBN 0-7851-2903-0 (hardcover, July 2007, ISBN 0-7851-2513-2)
- The Thanos Imperative (collects The Thanos Imperative #1–6, The Thanos Imperative: Ignition, The Thanos Imperative: Devastation, Thanos Sourcebook), 248 pages, hardcover, February 2011, ISBN 0-7851-5183-4
- Infinity (collects Infinity #1–6, New Avengers vol. 3, #7–12, Avengers vol 5, #14–23, Infinity: Against the Tide Infinite Comic #1–2), 632 pages, hardcover, February 2014, ISBN 978-0785184225
- Thanos Rising (collects Thanos Rising #1–5), 136 pages, hardcover, July 2014, ISBN 978-0785190479
- Thanos: A God Up There Listening (collects Thanos: A God Up There Listening #1–4 and Thanos Annual #1), 120 pages, hardcover, December 2014, ISBN 978-0785191582
- Thanos vs. Hulk (collects Thanos vs. Hulk #1–4, Warlock (1972) #12), 112 pages, June 2015, ISBN 978-0785197126
- Thanos: Cosmic Powers (collects Secret Defenders #12–14, Cosmic Powers #1–6), 344 pages, November 2015, ISBN 978-0785198178
- Deadpool vs. Thanos (collects Deadpool vs. Thanos #1–4), 112 pages, December 2015, ISBN 978-0785198451
- The Infinity Gauntlet: Warzones! (collects The Infinity Gauntlet #1–5), 112 pages, December 2015, ISBN 978-0785198741
- Siege: Battleworld (collects Siege #1–4, Uncanny X-Men (2011) #9–10), 144 pages, February 2016, ISBN 978-0785195498
- Secret Wars (collects Secret Wars #1–9 and material from Secret Wars #0 FCBD), 312 pages, March 2016, ISBN 978-0785198840
- The Infinity Entity (collects: The Infinity Entity #1–4, Thanos Annual #1), 116 pages, July 2016, ISBN 978-0785194217'
- Thanos The Infinity Revelation, Jim Starlin, 2014, ISBN 978-0785184706
- Thanos The Infinity Relativity, Jim Starlin, 2015, ISBN 978-0785193036
- Thanos The Infinity Finale, Jim Starlin, Ron Lim, 2016, ISBN 978-0785193050
- Thanos Returns (collects Thanos Vol 2 #1-5), 136 pages, by Jeff Lemire, 2017 ISBN 978-1302905576
- Thanos Vol. 2: The God Quarry (collects Thanos Vol 2 #7-11), Jeff Lemire 2018, ISBN 978-1302905583
- Thanos Wins (collects Thanos Vol 2 #13-18, Thanos Annual #1), Donny Cates 2018, ISBN 978-1302905590
