= Pocket universe =

Concept in inflationary theory proposed by Alan Guth

A pocket universe or bubble universe, also called a pocket dimension, is a concept in inflationary theory proposed by Alan Guth.

== Description ==
In cosmology, the concept of eternal inflation describes a multiverse composed of numerous distinct regions, often referred to as pocket universes or inflationary zones, one of which contains the observable universe.

According to astrophysicist Jean-Luc Lehners of the Princeton Center for Theoretical Science, eternal inflation may give rise to multiple such regions. In a 2012 publication, Lehners examined how pocket universes can emerge from the dynamics of eternal inflation and proposed that their subsequent evolution may follow different cosmological scenarios, including slow-roll inflation, cyclic cosmology, or emergent models such as Galilean genesis. He further discussed how the question of which type of universe is most probable depends on the choice of measure used to regulate the infinities associated with eternal inflation.

Lehners argues that several leading measure proposals, including the global light-cone cutoff and the causal diamond measure, predict a higher probability of inhabiting a pocket universe that begins with a relatively small Hubble expansion rate. Such predictions are consistent with models involving emergent or cyclic cosmological evolution. Cyclic pocket universes may be particularly favored in this framework, as repeated cosmological cycles could produce habitable conditions multiple times within a single region.

== In media ==
In the SCP Foundation series of collaborative writing, SCP-106, otherwise known as "The Old Man," dwells in his pocket dimension into which everything inside of it is controlled by him & lures its victims.

The Phantom Zone in many Superman media is depicted as a prison reality wherein Kryptonian prisoners are confined, as Kryptonian law prohibits capital punishment.

In the video game Reverse: 1999, the main character Vertin carries a suitcase which has a pocket dimension inside of it.

In the animated series Centaurworld, the gerenuk centaur Glendale has a pocket universe inside her stomach, which the other centaurs refer to as her "portal tummy."

In the 2025 film Superman, the villain Lex Luthor created a pocket universe using a megacollider.

== In religion ==
In Hindu cosmology, the "bubble universe" refers to the concept of a vast multiverse where numerous universes, or brahmans, exist simultaneously, resembling bubbles floating in space or emerging from the divine breath of Vishnu.
