= List of fictional deities =

This is a list of deities from fictional works. They are organized by media type, then by the title of their fictional work, series, franchise, or author. This list does not include deities worshiped by humans in the real world even if they appear in fictional works. However, such deities may be included if they are considered to have been modified enough to distinguish them from their extant counterparts.

== Literature ==
=== The Chronicles of Narnia ===
- Aslan – Deity in the form of a lion in Narnia
- Tash – A demon god of Calormen

=== The Cosmere ===
- Adonalsium – Creator or creation force of the Cosmere, shattered into 16 shards.

=== Cthulhu Mythos ===
- Azathoth – The Blind Idiot God
- Cthulhu – Fictional cosmic entity
- Nyarlathotep – Fictional Lovecraftian god
- Shub-Niggurath – Fictional deity in the Cthulhu Mythos

=== Dune ===
- Paul Atreides

=== J. R. R. Tolkien's legendarium ===
- Eru Ilúvatar – Creator deity of Tolkien's world
- Valar – Divine or angelic race in Tolkien's writings
- Maiar – Divine race from J. R. R. Tolkien's legendarium
- Melkor, also known as Morgoth Bauglir – An evil fallen deity
- Sauron – Primary antagonist in Tolkien's "The Lord of the Rings"

== Comics ==
=== DC Universe ===
- Ares – The Greek god of war and member of the Olympians.
- New Gods – Fictional species appearing in the New Gods comic book series
  - Darkseid – Apokoliptian god of evil
- Lords of Chaos and Order – Opposed groups of divine energy beings locked in eternal struggle
- The Presence – Comic book character
- Rao - Kryptonian sun god

==== Vertigo Comics ====
- Endless (comics) – Sandman comic characters
- Lucifer (DC Comics) – Comic book character
- Elaine Belloc – DC Comics character

=== Death Note ===
- Ryuk
- Rem (Death Note)
- Sidoh
- Other Shinigami

=== Dragon Ball ===
- Beerus
- Zamasu

=== Haruhi Suzumiya ===
- Haruhi Suzumiya

=== Marvel Universe ===
- Amatsu-Mikaboshi
- Asgardians
  - Balder the Brave
  - Enchantress
  - Executioner
  - Fandral
  - Frigga
  - Heimdall
  - Hela
  - Kelda
  - Loki
  - Lorelai
  - Magni
  - Odin – King of the Asgardians and ruler of Asgard.
  - Sif
  - Thor
  - Valkyrie
- Celestials
  - Arishem the Judge
  - Tiamut
- Cyttorak
- Death
- Eternals
  - Ajak
  - Druig
  - Forgotten One
  - Ikaris
  - Kingo Sunen
  - Kronos
  - Makkari
  - Mentor
  - Overmind
  - Phastos
  - Sersi
  - Sprite
  - Starfox
  - Thanos – A supervillain, the most powerful of the Titanian Eternals
  - Thena
  - Zuras
- Eternity
- Galactus
- In-Betweener – An incarnation of balance
- Knull
- Living Tribunal – Serves directly under the supreme being
- Lord Chaos
- The Stranger
- Olympians
  - Ares
  - Athena
  - Hera
  - Hermes
  - Hercules
  - Neptune
  - Pluto
  - Venus
  - Zeus – King of the Olympians.

=== Oh My Goddess! ===
- Skuld
- Urd
- Belldandy

== Film and television ==
=== Buffyverse ===
- First Evil – Buffy the Vampire Slayer villain
- Glorificus
- Illyria

=== Ghostbusters ===
- Gozer

=== Pirates of the Caribbean ===
- Tia Dalma

=== Transformers ===
- Unicron

== Games ==
=== Dragon Quest ===
- Malroth

=== Dungeons & Dragons ===
- Bahamut
- Corellon Larethian
- Moradin
- Mystra
- Takhisis
- Tharizdun
- Tiamat
- Vecna

=== Genshin Impact ===
- Furina
- Mavuika
- Nahida
- Raiden Shogun
- Venti
- Zhongli

=== God of War ===
- Kratos

=== Hades ===
- Megaera
- Melinoë
- Thanatos
- Zagreus

=== Legacy of Kain ===
- Kain – Title character of the Legacy of Kain series

=== Mortal Kombat ===
- Raiden
- Liu Kang in Mortal Kombat 1
- Shinnok

=== Ōkami ===
- Amaterasu

=== Pokémon ===
- Arceus

== See also ==
- Fictional religion
- Lists of deities
- List of demigods § Popular fiction
- List of fictional religions
