= A.X.E.: Judgment Day =

Comic book storyline

Publication information
- Publisher: Marvel Comics
- Format: Limited series
- Publication date: July – November 2022
- No. of issues: 6
- Main character: See below

Creative team
- Written by: Kieron Gillen
- Penciller: Valerio Schiti
- Colorist: Marte Garcia

Collected editions
- A.X.E.: Judgment Day: ISBN 978-1302947002
- A.X.E.: Judgment Day Companion: ISBN 978-1302947927
- Judgment Day Omnibus: ISBN 978-1302952907

A.X.E.: Judgment Day, also known as Avengers/X-Men/Eternals: Judgment Day or simply Judgement Day, is an American comic book crossover event during the Krakoan Age written by Kieron Gillen with art by Valerio Schiti, published in 2022 by Marvel Comics. The event involves the discovery of the mutant resurrection protocols and the subsequent conflict between the Avengers, the X-Men and the Eternals.

== Publication history ==
In December 2021, Marvel Comics posted a teaser "Judgment Day is Coming" involving the Avengers, the X-Men, and the Eternals.

The storyline was built upon previous plot developments from the last few years: the Avengers' assembling a powerful lineup at their base in the body of a fallen Celestial called the Progenitor in Avengers (vol. 8), the discovery of X-Men's immortality through the mutant resurrection protocols in Immortal X-Men, and the Eternals' newfound knowledge about their purpose in Eternals (vol. 5).

A.X.E.: Judgment Day was announced as six-issue limited series at "Judgment Day" panel in San Diego Comic-Con by Marvel Comics' Editor-in-Chief C.B. Cebulski and Executive editor/VP Nick Lowe on March July 22, 2022.

The series was preceded by Eve of Judgment and the Free Comic Book Day 2022: Avengers/X-Men issues and succeeded by A.X.E.: Judgment Day Omega.

== Main characters ==
The characters who were credited as main character in at least one issue from A.X.E.: Judgment Day #1 to #5.
- Ajak
- Arjun
- Black Panther
- Black King
- Cable
- Captain America
- Captain Marvel
- Cyclops
- Daniela
- Daredevil
- Destiny
- Doctor Doom
- Druig
- Egg
- Exodus
- Gilgamesh
- Hope Summers
- Ikaris
- Iron Man
- Jack of Knives
- Jada
- Katrina
- Kenta
- Komali
- Luke Cage
- Magik
- Magneto
- Makkari
- Marvel Girl
- Mister Sinister
- Ms. Marvel
- Mystique
- Namor
- Nightcrawler
- Nighthawk
- Phastos
- Phebe Reginax
- Phoenix
- Professor X
- The Progenitor
- Red Bishop
- Red Queen
- Rheaka Centaurus
- Sersi
- Spider-Man
- Starbrand
- Starfox
- Storm
- Syne the Memotaur
- Tetytrona
- Themex
- Thieka the Harpsicus
- Thor
- Tom
- Uranos
- White Queen
- Wolverine
- Zuras

== Plot ==
=== Prelude ===
After receiving votes from the Uni-Mind, Thanos successfully takes over the title of Prime Eternal and kills his uncle Zuras in revenge; he then murders Druig to prevent any memory of his weakness.

While researching his parentage and Deviant heritage, Thanos visits his grand-uncle Uranos, who is imprisoned in the Exclusion, and questions him about the Machine, an artificial intelligence that is bound to and oversees Earth. Uranos tells Thanos and Druig about the Eternals' three moral principles: protecting Celestials, protecting the Machine, and correcting excess deviation. Millennia ago, Uranos argued with Kronos and Oceanus about the three principles and decided that eradicating all Deviants and humans and imprisoning Celestials would provide benefit for all Eternals, tactics his brothers opposed. His genocide of Deviants caused a civil war, resulting in 600,000 years of imprisonment, along with Druig's betrayal. After Druig departs, Uranos secretly gives Thanos the imprint key, an armory that allows him to access Uranos' fail-safe to destroy the Machine.

Ajak confronts the Celestial Progenitor and questions the reasoning behind the Deviants' creation. Ajak is despondent when she learns that the Celestials created the Deviants in response to the Progenitors' death releasing noxious Necrofluids that pollute Earth's environment. To prevent all of Earth's lifeforms from extinction byway of the Deviants' self-destruct mutation, the Celestials created the Eternals as their backup to prevent Deviant extinction, allowing the Deviants to adapt to the Necrofluid's toxicity; this resulted in stable lifeforms. Thanos realizes that his Eternal and Deviant genes are folly to him, as the Machine does not recognize him as an Eternal; he then plans to activate the fail-safe, garnering the attention of all Eternals. As Thanos overpowers the Eternals, Druig inadvertently activates Phastos' fail-safe, killing Thanos. Druig becomes the new Prime Eternal and asks the Machine for locations of excess deviation. It highlights Lemuria and Krakoa.

Cyclops confesses to Ben Urich his knowledge of the mutant resurrection protocols, believing that this may prevent Orchis' plan to incite tensions and public backlash. Emma Frost reveals the truth to Cyclops about Moira MacTaggert's motives and betrayal. After successfully infiltrating the Hellfire Gala, MacTaggert meets with Druig and Jack of Knives and tells them to kill the Five.

On Olympia, Domo creates an anti-matter bomb to attack Krakoa. The anti-matter bomb activates, heading to an undersea location, only for Domo to deactivate it. When Druig wonders what has occurred, Domo states that Krakoa is sentient and is thus a part of the Machine. Domo tells Druig that he will think of another method, only to have Druig turn down his suggestion. Wanting another way to commit genocide and knowing of an expert on the subject, Druig goes to the Exclusion to offer Uranos a proposition.

=== Plot ===
Knowledge of the mutant resurrection protocols is made public, resulting in mass protests. On Krakoa, Nightcrawler and Mystique speak with Destiny to confirm her prediction of an impending war. Jack of Knives leads an attack on Krakoa, with Egg being taken down. However, the Eternal fleets suddenly retreat. Druig broadcasts himself to the people of Earth, declaring that the Eternals will help them deal with the "mutant threat" while advising them not to fear the towering death machines that have emerged off the western seaboard of the United States. In retaliation, Captain America assembles the Avengers. Iron Man responds to an intruder alert, only to find Ajak, Makkari, and a bound Mister Sinister; Ajak wants Iron Man's help to forge a god, with the purpose being to end the war.

As Druig's declaration of war is echoed across the world, the everyday lives of civilians Tom, Katrina, Arjun, Daniela, Jada, and Kenta are shown. Captain Marvel leads Echo, Star Brand, Thor, Storm, and others into battling Thieaka and Syne, death machines that emerged off the western seaboard of the United States. Jean Grey gets a status report from Cyclops that the vaults are secured and the X-Men have breached the Eternal armories to cut the Hex's power supply. Despite the heroes' success in banishing the Hex, the Progenitor regains consciousness and declares Judgment Day after showing its disappointment with the people of Earth for their unrelenting cruelty and bickering. The Progenitor addresses the people of Earth, warning that they will be judged within the next 24 hours, both individually and collectively; if they possess more righteousness than wickedness, they will live. Otherwise, there will be no tomorrow.

Iron Man discusses a plan with the Avengers, Ajax's group of Eternals, and Mister Sinister to disable the Progenitor by removing its internal node. Destiny calls a meeting with the Quiet Council of Krakoa, informing them that Sinister has discovered a weakness on the Progenitor that must be hit. Destiny, Sebastian Shaw, Exodus, Mystique, and Hope Summers are in favor of an attack, while Emma Frost abstains. When Jean Grey attacks the Progenitor's node, everyone ends up in the mind of the Progenitor. It passes negative judgment for Frost, Mystique, and Destiny, gives Kro a positive judgment, and considers the others longer. Phastos agrees that the group must take further action to receive a positive judgment from the Progenitor.

Luke Cage and Professor X receive negative judgement, while Ms. Marvel, Doctor Doom, and Miles Morales receive positive judgement. Starfox is approached by Sebastian Shaw, who asks if he speaks for the Eternals. As Druig states that they can bring even the Hex into the Uni-Mind to unleash its war form, Uranos states he is still waiting to be released; Druig declines. He orders the Eternals to unleash the Uni-Mind. Uranos manipulates Druig into having the Machine release him, allowing Uranos to attack Olympia. Uranos defeats Ikaris and Gilgamesh, sealing them inside the Machine. Magneto and Storm confront Uranos, buying Iron Man enough time to hack into the portals; this enables one of the armories to weaken Uranos. The Progenitor then judges Ikaris and Sersi; he awards positive judgment to Ikaris and negative judgment to Sersi. Starfox then persuades the Progenitor that the world is still trying to fight its problems while planning for peace in the future, similar to the mutants making Mars habitable. The Progenitor makes the final judgment as it unleashes a beam that starts to kill the rioters who Captain America was facing.

After being teleported to the Progenitor, Captain America speaks with the Progenitor on how the Avengers have always fought for justice. The Progenitor reduces Captain America and Nightcrawler to bones. When Nightcrawler is reborn on Krakoa, Jean Grey states that the Worlds' anger is directed. Professor X speaks with Bishop, Cyclops, Iron Man, Jean Grey, Sersi, and Starfox on the next approach. Meanwhile, the Progenitor causes destruction around the world. Iron Man and the survivors work on coming up with a new plan as the Progenitor is integrating with the Machine.

Nightcrawler informs Starfox that Phastos' resetting of the Machine has given them some time as his A.I. colleagues are working to keep the Machine from self-destructing. Inside the Progenitor, Iron Man, Jean Grey, Mister Sinister, Wolverine, Ajak, Sersi, and Makkari fight their way past the Celestial Antibodies as they reach the core. The Progenitor then attacks them, stating that they have failed its tests. As Sersi attempts to persuade the Progenitor, it vanquishes her, believing that the truth will not save humanity due to the resentful backlash toward her; but Iron Man states that humanity can change, similar to the Eternals. Showing empathy for the Progenitor, Jean recalls what she went through when the Dark Phoenix decimated the D'Bari's homeworld, while Iron Man has worked to make amends for his decisions and has learned the virtue of heroism. After being told that it is not a god, the Progenitor confesses that he had given up on saving humanity and asks Ajak if it was. Ajak shamefully gives it a thumbs down for disapproval and it asks her to be better. This causes the Progenitor to shut down and the entire Earth is restored. Ajak is transformed into a new Eternal, having merged with a Celestial body and renaming herself Ajak Celestia; she plans to make herself worthy to the Eternals and act as their new god. Starfox makes Zuras the Prime Eternal again and has him apologize on TV to the X-Men for the war the Eternals waged on the mutants. Druig is incarcerated along with Uranos, while the Phoenix Foundation is established as a body independent from Krakoa, with the goal of experimenting in reviving non-mutants. The Progenitor's narration asserts that humanity has failed its test and assures that Ajak Celestia can become a worthy god and continue her judgment on the world.

=== Aftermath ===
In the Temple of Ajak Celestia, Makkari documents Ajak's victory over the Progenitor and Ajak's transformation into Ajak Celestia. After finishing the book, Makkari is told by Ajak Celestia to make the book about heresy. At the Temple of Ajak Celestia, Starfox tells Phastos that he and Zuras are going to apologize in person while planning to have his parents freed. Phastos, Kingo Sunen, Ikaris, Sprite, and Thena meet with Ajak Celestia, who mentions that Sersi was a martyr and hopes that there can be a miracle for the Eternals. Ajak Celestia states that she must be a better god and the Eternals have to be better Eternals. She then passes the new Theses on the Principals involving protecting Celestials, protecting the machine, correcting excess deviation, and giving anyone 24 hours to justify themselves. Meanwhile, Uranos is imprisoned alongside Druig, who he gladly beats up to pass time. Ikaris moves to New York, stating that he will do everything he can to make up for his actions. A final narration claims that the Eternals will continue to protect humanity and that the Machine is fully operational with no malfunctions remaining.

== Issues involved ==
=== Prelude issues ===
Title	Issues	Writer	Artist	Colorist	Debut date	Conclusion date
Eternals (vol. 5)	10–12	Kieron Gillen	Esad Ribić	Matt Wilson	March 9, 2022	May 18, 2022
Eternals: The Heretic	1	Kieron Gillen	Ryan Bodenheim; Edgar Salazar	Chris O'Halloran	March 12, 2022	
Free Comic Book Day 2022: Avengers/X-Men	1	Kieron Gillen	Dustin Weaver	Marte Gracia	May 7, 2022	
A.X.E.: Eve of Judgment	1	Kieron Gillen	Pasqual Ferry	Dean White	July 13, 2022	

=== Main series ===
Title	Issues	Writer	Artist	Colorist	Debut date	Conclusion date
A.X.E.: Judgment Day	1–6	Kieron Gillen	Valerio Schiti	Marte Gracia	July 20, 2022	October 26, 2022
A.X.E.: Judgment Day Omega	1	Kieron Gillen	Guiu Vilanova	Andres Mossa	November 9, 2022	

=== Tie-in issues ===
Title	Issue	Writer	Artist	Colorist	Debut date	Conclusion Date
Amazing Spider-Man (vol. 6)	10	Zeb Wells	John Romita Jr.	Marcio Menyz	September 28, 2022	
Avengers (vol. 8)	60	Mark Russell	Greg Land	David Curiel	September 21, 2022	
A.X.E.: Avengers	1	Kieron Gillen	Federico Vincentini	Marte Gracia	September 28, 2022	
A.X.E.: Death to the Mutants	1–3	Kieron Gillen	Guiu Vilanova	Dijjo Lima	August 17, 2022	October 12, 2022
A.X.E.: Eternals	1	Kieron Gillen	Pasqual Ferry	Matt Hollingsworth	October 12, 2022	
A.X.E.: Iron Fist	1	Alyssa Wong	Michael YG	Brad Anderson	October 12, 2022	
A.X.E.: Starfox	1	Kieron Gillen	Francesco Mobili	Valerio Alloro	October 5, 2022	
A.X.E.: X-Men	1	Kieron Gillen	Daniele Di Nicuolo	Frank Martin	October 5, 2022	
Captain Marvel (vol. 10)	42	Kelly Thompson	Andrea Di Vito	Nolan Woodard	October 12, 2022	
Fantastic Four (vol. 6)	47–48	David Pepose	Juann Cabal	Jesus Aburtov	September 21, 2022	October 12, 2022
Immortal X-Men	5–7	Kieron Gillen	Michele Bandini	David Curiel	August 3, 2022	October 12, 2022
Legion of X	6	Si Spurrier	Rafael Pimentel	Federico Blee	October 12, 2022	
Marauders (vol. 2)	6	Steve Orlando	Andrea Broccardo	Matt Milla	September 7, 2022	
Wolverine (vol. 7)	24–25	Benjamin Percy	Federico Vicentini	Frank Martin	September 7, 2022	October 12, 2022
X-Force (vol. 6)	30–33	Benjamin Percy	Robert Gill	Guru-eFX	August 17, 2022	October 19, 2022
X-Men (vol. 6)	13–14	Gerry Duggan	Carlos Villa	Marte Gracia	August 17, 2022	August 31, 2022
X-Men Red (vol. 2)	5–7	Al Ewing	Stefano Caselli	Federico Blee	August 3, 2022	October 5, 2022

== Collected editions ==
Title	Material collected	Publication Date	ISBN
A.X.E.: Judgment Day	A.X.E.: Judgment Day #1–6, A.X.E.: Avengers #1, A.X.E.: Eternals #1, A.X.E.: X-Men #1 and material from Free Comic Book Day 2022: Avengers/X-Men #1	December 20, 2022	978-1302947002
A.X.E.: Judgment Day Companion	A.X.E.: Eve of Judgment #1, A.X.E.: Judgment Day Omega #1, A.X.E.: Death to the Mutants #1–3, A.X.E.: Starfox #1, A.X.E.: Iron Fist #1 and Fantastic Four (2018) #47–48	December 20, 2022	978-1302947927
Judgment Day Omnibus	A.X.E.: Eve of Judgment, A.X.E.: Judgment Day #1-6, Immortal X-Men #5-7, X-Men Red (2022) #5-7, A.X.E.: Death to the Mutants #1-3, X-Force (2020) #30-33, X-Men (2021) #13-14, Wolverine (2020) #24 and #25 (A story), Marauders (2022) #6, Fantastic Four (2018) #47-48, Avengers (2018) #60, A.X.E.: Avengers, Amazing Spider-Man (2022) #10, A.X.E.: X-Men, A.X.E.: Iron Fist, A.X.E.: Starfox, Captain Marvel (2019) #42, A.X.E.: Eternals and A.X.E.: Judgment Day Omega	January 30, 2024	978-1302952907

== Reception ==
According to Comic Book Roundup, the event received an average rating of 8.4 out of 10 based on 74 reviews.
