= Ajak =

Fictional character appearing in American comic books published by Marvel Comics

Publication information
- Publisher: Marvel Comics
- First appearance: The Eternals #2 (August 1976)
- Created by: Jack Kirby

In-story information
- Species: Eternal
- Team affiliations: Eternals; God Squad
- Notable aliases: The Legendary Inca Hero; Tecumotzin Lord of Flight
- Abilities: Superhuman speed, strength, and durability; Cosmic energy manipulation; Accelerated healing factor; Near-immortality; Energy blasts; Teleportation; Flight

Ajak is a fictional character appearing in American comic books published by Marvel Comics. Created by Jack Kirby, Ajak first appeared in The Eternals #2 (August 1976). The character is usually depicted as a member of the Eternals, a human offshoot race in the Marvel Universe, and as a member of the God Squad.

The Marvel Cinematic Universe film Eternals featured Ajak portrayed by Salma Hayek.

== Publication history ==
Ajak first appeared in The Eternals #2 (August 1976), and was created by Jack Kirby.

== Fictional character biography ==
Ajak is a member of the Polar Eternals, a band of the near-immortal Eternals based in the Ural Mountains of Russia. Ajak's earliest known interactions with humanity occurred in Babylon around 2500 BC, when he was among the Eternals who clashed with the Deviants and their leader Kro. Around 1200 BC, Ajak and his brother Arex were active in Greece, where they were known respectively as Ajax the Greater and Ajax the Lesser. Around 1000 AD, Ajak lived in Peru, where he assumed the identity of Tecumotzin and Quetzalcōātl. Ajak acted as a mediator with the Celestials when they visited Earth. After the Celestials departed, Ajak placed himself into suspended animation along with his assistants.

Ajak and his men are awakened by fellow Eternal Ikaris in time to greet the Fourth Host of the Celestials. Ajak once again serves as communicator and befriends human archaeologist Daniel Damian. The Celestials ultimately judge in Earth's favor and leave. Ajak and the Eternals leave Earth; during their absence, Damian's daughter Margo is killed by the Deviants. Blaming the Eternals and Deviants for Margo's death, Damian uses Celestial technology to transform Ajak into a monster and sends him to kill Donald and Deborah Ritter, the children of Kro and Thena. After he is returned to normal, Ajak is distraught by his actions and disintegrates himself, killing Damian in the process.

=== "Secret Invasion" ===
Ajak was resurrected in the third volume of the Eternals series. In the 2008 "Secret Invasion" storyline, Ajak joins Hercules' "God Squad" to battle the Skrull gods, not only to defend Earth but also to gain a greater understanding of the Skrulls. Ajak is subsequently killed in the confrontation with the Skrull God Kly'bn.

=== Revenge against Makkari ===
Later, a revived Ajak—now in a female form—and the other Eternals continue the mission of awakening Eternals who no longer remember who they are and are living human lives, thanks to Sprite. During this time, Ajak breeds resentment towards Makkari for being the Dreaming Celestial's chosen communicator, warning the other Eternals that the Dreaming Celestial is broken. While Ikaris' and Druig's opposing forces race to awaken and convert as many "sleeping" Eternals as they can to their respective sides, Ajak locates Gilgamesh in Peru, manipulating them into believing Ikaris' Eternals are Deviants. Gilgamesh kills Makkari, sparking a conflict between Ikaris and Druig.

=== Death ===
Later, when the Celestials' Final Host arrived on Earth, Ajak, along with all the Eternals, killed themselves after realizing the true purpose for which they were created. Ajak and the other Eternals are later resurrected simultaneously.

== Powers and abilities ==
Ajak possesses the standard Eternal abilities of cosmic energy manipulation and complete control of one's own cellular makeup. The physical control granted gives Eternals an indefinitely prolonged lifespan and cellular regeneration along with superhuman strength and durability, in addition to cosmic powers granting them flight, teleportation and the ability to fire energy bolts. Ajak also possesses the ability to directly communicate with the Celestials when they are nearby.

== Reception ==
=== Accolades ===
- In 2021, CBR.com ranked Ajak 3rd in their "15 Most Powerful Eternals" list.

== In other media ==
- Ajak appears in Marvel Knights: Eternals, voiced by Kirby Morrow.
- Ajak appears in Eternals (2021), portrayed by Salma Hayek.
