= Zuras =

Marvel Comics fictional character

Publication information
- Publisher: Marvel Comics
- First appearance: As Jupiter: Red Raven Comics #1 (August 1940); As Zuras: The Eternals #5 (November 1976)
- Created by: Martin A. Bursten; Jack Kirby

In-story information
- Alter ego: Zuras
- Team affiliations: Eternals
- Notable aliases: Zeus, Quetzalcoatl
- Abilities: Superhuman strength, superhuman speed, stamina, agility, reflexes, durability, force shields, regenerative healing factor, cosmic energy manipulation allows energy blasts, flight, illusion generation, telepathy, and teleportation.

Zuras is a fictional character appearing in American comic books published by Marvel Comics. The character is depicted as a member of the Eternals who is the uncle of Thanos and Starfox.

Created by Martin A. Bursten and Jack Kirby, the character first appeared as Jupiter in Red Raven Comics #1 (August 1940), but was later reintroduced as Zuras in The Eternals #5 (November 1976).

== Publication history ==
Zuras first appeared in The Eternals #5 (November 1976), and was created by Jack Kirby.

Marvel Comics continuity was later retconned so that the character presented as the mythological god Jupiter, introduced in Red Raven Comics #1 ("Mercury in the 20th Century" by artist Kirby and writer Martin A. Bursten; August 1940), was, in fact, Zuras.

== Fictional character biography ==
Zuras was born in Titanos, the first city of the Eternals, and is the son of the Eternals Kronos and Daina, and brother of A'Lars (Mentor). With his wife Cybele, he has a daughter Thena and is also the uncle of Thanos and Starfox and the nephew of Uranos.

Zuras was a warrior and vied with his brother A'lars (whom he exiled into space) for leadership of the Eternals of Titanos following Kronos' death. Zuras was the first Eternal to form a Uni-Mind by creating the first ritual of the Uni-Mind, and was therefore chosen to become the leader of the Eternals of Earth. He was mistaken for the Greek god Zeus many times in the past, and ultimately forged a pact with Zeus to keep their people at peace. When Kro spread chaos in the 1940s, Zuras sent Makkari to oppose him. He also forced the Forgotten One into exile, stripped him of his name, and forbade the Eternals from communicating with him.

Zuras authorized Thena to resume her battles against the Deviants, and ordered her and Makkari to battle against Zakka in New York. He also aided Mr. Bradford, a government agent, in studying the Celestials. Zuras used his psychic abilities to learn about the Celestial spacecraft and discovered that the Fourth Celestial Host was on its way. He initiated the first Uni-Mind fusion of Eternals in modern times to attempt to communicate with Arishem.

Zuras initiated a second Uni-Mind fusion to engage the Celestial mothership, but this was interrupted by Odin and Zeus to prevent the Eternals from interfering in a pact the gods had made with the Celestials. Zuras then allied himself with Odin and initiated the third Uni-Mind to combat the Fourth Host of Celestials in Peru. While fused with the Eternals in the Uni-Mind formation, Zuras attacked the Fourth Celestial host. The Uni-Mind was blown apart by a cosmic blast from the Celestials Gammenon and Jemiah, causing it to disintegrate into its component Eternals, and the backlash rendered Zuras brain dead. Zuras's body is later destroyed by the Deviants.

=== Reborn ===
Sprite stated that he used the pieces of machinery of Olympia to partially "reactivate" Zuras—and then deceived Zuras into visiting the tomb of the Dreaming Celestial, forming a Uni-Mind there. This provides Sprite with the power to rewrite some aspects of reality, stripping the other Eternals of their powers and memories.

In the "rewritten" world, Zuras was made into an alcoholic homeless man, with mental problems. He is later restored by Ajak. Zuras tracks down Sprite and kills him by snapping his neck.

Zuras and the other Eternals committed suicide upon discovering their ultimate destiny when the Celestial's Final Host descended on Earth. Zuras and the other Eternals are later resurrected simultaneously.

== Powers and abilities ==
Zuras has achieved above-average development of the normal attributes of the race of Eternals through great discipline. He possesses superhuman strength, speed, stamina, and durability, and can fly at supersonic speeds. Zuras possesses the ability to manipulate cosmic energy to augment his life force granting him great longevity and regenerative abilities, the projection of concussive force, heat, and electrical energy up to a maximum range of 300 feet. He could also use cosmic energy to create force shields around himself, to levitate himself and others, and to psionically manipulate molecules to transform an object's shape. During his lifetime, Zuras was the only Eternal known capable of initiating the creation of the Uni-Mind (the collective life-form resulting from the physical and mental merging of a significant number of Eternals) by himself. Zuras is also capable of telepathy, illusion-casting, and limited teleportation.

Zuras possesses extensive knowledge of ancient and arcane wisdom.

== Reception ==
- In 2021, CBR.com ranked Zuras 11th in their "15 Most Powerful Eternals" list.
- In 2021, Screen Rant ranked Zuras 7th in their "10 Most Powerful Members Of The Eternals" list
- In 2021, CBR.com ranked Zuras 3rd in their "10 Strongest Characters From Eternals Comics" list.
