= Sersi =

Marvel Comics fictional character

- Sersi as depicted in Eternals (vol. 3) #2. (September 2006). Art by Rick Berry.

Publication information
- Publisher: Marvel Comics
- First appearance: As Circe (pre-Marvel): Venus #9 (May 1950); As Circe: Strange Tales #109 (June 1963); As Sersi: The Eternals #3 (September 1976)
- Created by: Stan Lee; Robert Bernstein; Jack Kirby; Werner Roth

In-story information
- Alter ego: Sersi
- Species: Eternal
- Team affiliations: Eternals; Avengers; Heroes for Hire; New Breed; God Squad
- Notable aliases: Circe, Sylvia Sersy, Mesmer, Sorceress
- Abilities: Superhuman strength, speed, agility, reflexes, stamina and durability; Molecular and atomic manipulation; Manifest cosmic energy as any form of electromagnetism (heat, light, electricity, etc); Telepathy; Invulnerability; Telekinesis; Immortality; Flight; Teleportation

Sersi (/ˈsɜːrsi/) is a fictional character appearing in American comic books published by Marvel Comics. The character is depicted as a member of the Eternals, a race of superhumans. She was also a member of the Avengers and God Squad. Sersi first appeared in the 1976–1978 comic book series The Eternals.

Gemma Chan portrays Sersi in the Marvel Cinematic Universe (MCU) film Eternals (2021).

== Publication history ==
Sersi first appeared in Jack Kirby's The Eternals #3 (September 1976) as Sersy. Although The Eternals was published by Marvel Comics, it was not treated as part of the Marvel Universe, but rather as a stand-alone series.

In the 1980s, she made guest appearances in the series The Avengers and Captain America.

Later, Marvel Comics continuity was retconned so that Sersi was the Greek mythological enchantress Circe, as introduced in Strange Tales #109 by Stan Lee, Robert Bernstein, and Kirby (June 1963). A different version of Circe had also previously appeared in the Atlas Comics (Marvel's predecessor company) publication Venus #9 ("Beauty for Everyone! A Dream is Born!" by artist Werner Roth, May 1950).

In 1990, Sersi joined the Avengers team, after her fellow Eternal Gilgamesh left the team following an injury. Sersi left the team in 1994.

After Malibu Comics was acquired by Marvel, Sersi and the Black Knight were incorporated into the short-lived Ultraverse imprint along with other Marvel characters.

During the 2006 relaunch of the Eternals, the character was redesigned by Neil Gaiman.

Sersi and the other Eternals returned in Jason Aaron's Avengers. They were then all killed in a story arc involving the Dark Celestials in issue #4.

== Fictional character biography ==
=== Origins and early history ===
Sersi is a fourth-generation member of the Eternals, an evolutionary offshoot of the human race. She is the daughter of the Eternals Helios and Perse and was probably born in Olympia, Greece, sometime after the Great Cataclysm that destroyed the continents of Atlantis and Lemuria during an extended ice age known as the Hyborean Age. At a young age, Sersi differed from her fellow Eternals in her desire to live among humans. Sersi first met Captain America, who had travelled back in time, during her time in ancient Mesopotamia.

A few thousand years later, Sersi was based in ancient Greece, where she met the poet Homer, who would later write one of the earliest works in Western literature, The Odyssey. Sersi served as inspiration for Homer's character Circe. Under the name of Circe, Sersi imprisoned the imps in Pandora's box.

Unlike the majority of her fellow Eternals, who stay in hidden cities, Sersi revels in her humanity. Except for the Forgotten One, she has lived amongst humans more than any other Eternal. This includes various places of historical importance like Nero's Rome and Camelot, the court of King Arthur, where she helped Merlin the magician defeat an impostor who had usurped his position. Sersi also fought alongside Thor in the Viking Siege of Paris, although he was not aware of this. She has been a dancer, actress, stage magician, hedonist and adventurer.

=== The Marvel Age ===
In The Eternals #3-5, published in 1976, Sersi battled Deviants in New York City, after which anthropologist Dr. Samuel Holden introduced her to the world at large at New York's City College, along with other Eternals. Sersi became fascinated with the soft-spoken Doctor and began a relationship with him. Sersi turned out to be a staunch ally to the Eternals in their struggles with the Deviants.

The Avenger Captain America needed someone with illusion-casting or shape-changing abilities for help with a case he was working on. He found Sersi's address on the Avengers' database and decided to ask her for help. Sersi was happy to aid Captain America, but required a favor from him in return — a dinner invitation. Captain America later invites Sersi to join the Avengers due to her previous assistance, which she accepted.

=== Black Knight's love and Proctor's evil ===
During this time, Sersi began a relationship with fellow Avenger Dane Whitman, the Black Knight. The Avengers began a fight against a villain called Proctor, who was reuniting Avengers from different realities, forming a team called The Gatherers.

A romantic triangle forms between Sersi, the Black Knight, and Crystal. These tensions came to a climax when the Avengers travel to the planet Polemachus. When the villainous priest Anskar murders a young girl named Astra, Sersi kills him in retribution. The other Eternals worry about Sersi's instability and believe that she is developing Mahd W'yry, a breakdown of the mind due to the Eternals' extended lives. If Sersi was found to have Mahd W'yry, the Eternals planned to cleanse her by molecular disintegration, which would kill her. Sprite, who had learned of Sersi's relations with the Black Knight, proposes that the Knight be made her Gann Josin (a concept the Eternals use to describe an intimate joining of two minds as soulmates in their own personal Uni-Mind). Ikaris enacts the Gann Josin and links Sersi and Black Knight. Black Knight is not happy with the result, for he had decided that he loved Crystal and not Sersi.

Sersi is approached by Proctor, who reveals that he was behind her instability and had been killing her alternate universe selves. Black Knight uncovers that Proctor is an alternate universe version of himself as Proctor begins using the life energies of Sersi and the Watcher Ute to collapse the various realities into one another. Sersi manages to kill Proctor, but decides to leave for another universe, fearing that Proctor's manipulation is not reversible. Black Knight joins Sersi in her exile, feeling responsible for her suffering.

=== Lost in the Ultraverse ===
Sersi and Black Knight are transported to the Ultraverse, with Sersi ending up in equatorial Africa and Black Knight in Miami. In the Ultraverse, Sersi is possessed by the spirit of one of the Infinity Gems, the Ego gem. Under the Ego Gem's control, Sersi learns that the Grandmaster had journeyed to the Ultraverse in an attempt to obtain the Mind Gem. The Grandmaster and Loki begin fighting for control of the Mind Gem, pitting the Avengers and Ultraforce against each other. The battles ended in a stalemate, and Loki claims victory. The Grandmaster, under the Ego Gem's will, revealed Sersi to Loki. She was able to separate him from the Gems before he could act. At this time, the Ego Gem released Sersi from its power. Reuniting with the six other Gems, they were rendered entirely sentient, becoming a cosmic being called Nemesis.

Nemesis wanted to create a new world, and joined elements from both the Avengers' and Ultraforce's worlds to create an amalgam universe. There were too many conflicting elements though, and when Topaz of the Ultraverse made physical contact with Loki, elements from two wildly different continua, the structure snapped. In her panic, Nemesis teleported to the Ultra's Earth, and intended to continue creating there, even if it meant the destruction of the already present world. The six other Gems resisted her, as Nemesis lacked the controlling influence that was needed to unite them. The Avengers and Ultraforce joined forces to stop her. Creating a diversion, they attacked her together, allowing the Black Knight to get close enough to separate the Gems once more. In the resulting explosion, the Avengers were returned to the Marvel Universe Earth, while Ultraforce and the Black Knight returned to the Ultraverse. Sersi wandered in limbo until the Black Knight returned to her.

=== Ancient enemies – modern rebirth ===
In time, Sersi and the Black Knight return to Earth-616, but not before traveling back in time to the era of the Crusades, where they fought the villain Exodus. The two were separated once more on their return to their correct timeline. The Black Knight found himself in New York, but as the Avengers were dead in the wake of Onslaught's attack, he joined the Heroes for Hire. Sersi found herself in Lemuria. Upon learning of yet another plot by Ghaur, she escaped to get aid. On finding the Avengers dead, she also turned to the Heroes for Hire. Foiling Ghaur's plot, Sersi and the Black Knight decided that they both needed some time apart after all they had been through.

Sersi returned to Olympia, where she remained (apart from aiding the Avengers in their battle against Morgan le Fey) until she joined the New Breed, a group of Eternals posing as a human super team aiming to control the Deviants.

=== The Eternals (2006) ===
Sersi moved to New York, where she planned parties for a living. She could not remember her origin as an Eternal, nor her powers. She was hired by Druig, deputy Prime Minister of Vorozheika, to publicize a small former Soviet republic by organizing a party at the Vorozheikan embassy. After the party was saved from a group of gunmen by Mark Curry and Iron Man, Iron Man questioned Sersi about registering, as she was a former Avenger. Sersi was perplexed by this, and Iron Man was confounded when he finds that there are no longer any records of Sersi in the Avengers database. She tests her powers out and accidentally turns a cat into a dragon.

If the Eternal known as Sprite is to be believed, the Eternals' memories of their history and lives are actually a complex illusion created by him (a possible retcon of the Eternals' origin brought to the fore in this new Comic miniseries). Sersi is actually much closer to half a million years old rather than five thousand years old and has had the Eternal Makkari as an on-again, off-again lover for hundreds of thousands of years. By the end of the series, she decides that she wants to resume her normal life, wishing to be neither an Eternal nor an Avenger.

=== Death ===
When the Final Host arrives on Earth, Sersi and all the other Eternals kill themselves after realizing their purpose. Her body is seen when Iron Man and Doctor Strange travel to the mountains of Greece to get answers from the Eternals. Sersi and the other Eternals are later resurrected simultaneously.

== Powers and abilities ==
As a member of the Eternals, Sersi has their standard abilities, though she has focused her power into transmutational abilities and passed it off as illusion or magic over the centuries. Sersi's psionic ability to rearrange the molecular structure of objects is far greater than that of any other Eternal. The limits on Sersi's molecular rearrangement powers are as yet unrevealed, but she once stated that even the Eternals' leader, Zuras, feared her, and Sprite claimed that she was the most powerful of all the Eternals. Sersi is the only living Fifth Level adept at matter transmutation (on a 1-5 scale). She has the ability to alter molecular and atomic structures of all matter including living organisms. However, she has expressed difficulty in rearranging sub-atomic matter.

== Reception ==
=== Accolades ===
- In 2015, Entertainment Weekly ranked Sersi 8th in their "Let's rank every Avenger ever" list.
- In 2018, Comic Book Resources (CBR) ranked Sersi 8th in their "25 Most Powerful Avengers Ever" list.
- In 2019, CBR ranked Sersi 8th in their "15 Most Powerful Eternals" list.
- In 2021, Screen Rant ranked Sersi 5th in their "10 Most Powerful Members Of The Eternals" list.
- In 2021, CBR ranked Sersi 4th in their "10 Strongest Characters From Eternals Comics" list.

== Other versions ==
Sersi has many other versions in the multiverse, but many of them were apparently killed by Proctor.

=== Mutant X ===
In Mutant X, Sersi and many other Eternals and Inhumans confront the murderous duo of Dracula and the Beyonder in Washington, D.C. They all perish.

== In other media ==
=== Film ===
Sersi appears in Eternals, portrayed by Gemma Chan. This version is an empathetic Eternal with an affinity for humankind who is capable of transmuting inorganic matter. She has been in love with Ikaris for centuries, before eventually becoming a museum curator on Earth and beginning a relationship with Dane Whitman. After Ajak's betrayal by Ikaris, she becomes the new Eternal leader. Chan is set to return as Sersi in future MCU films.

=== Video games ===
- Sersi made her video game debut as an unlockable playable character in Marvel Future Fight in March 2021. A Sersi costume, based on the MCU version of the character, was later added during the tie-in event to the release of Eternals in November of the same year.
- Sersi appears as an unlockable playable character in Marvel Contest of Champions.
- Sersi appears as an unlockable playable character in Marvel Super War.
- Sersi appears as an unlockable playable character in Marvel Strike Force.
- Sersi appears as an unlockable playable character in Marvel Puzzle Quest.
- Sersi appears as a companion character in Marvel Future Revolution.
- Sersi appears in Marvel Snap.

=== Miscellaneous ===
Sersi appears in Marvel Knights: Eternals motion comic, voiced by Kelly Sheridan.
