= Kingo =

Kingo is a surname and given name. Notable people with the name include:

- Kert Kingo (born 1968), Estonian politician
- Kingo Chunagon (1577–1602), 16th century Japanese military figure
- Thomas Kingo (1634–1703), Danish bishop, poet and hymn-writer

== Fictional ==
- Kingo Sunen, a fictional superhero
