= Kingo Sunen =

Marvel Comics fictional character

Publication information
- Publisher: Marvel Comics
- First appearance: The Eternals #11 (May 1977)
- Created by: Jack Kirby

In-story information
- Alter ego: Kingo Sunen
- Species: Eternal
- Team affiliations: Eternals
- Abilities: Immortality, master swordsman, other powers not demonstrated

Kingo Sunen is a character appearing in American comic books published by Marvel Comics. He first appeared in The Eternals #11 (May 1977) and was created by Jack Kirby. He is depicted as a member of the Eternals, a fictional race in the Marvel Comics universe.

The character appears in the Marvel Cinematic Universe in the 2021 film Eternals and the 2024 What If...? episode "What If... Agatha Went to Hollywood?", played by Kumail Nanjiani.

== Publication history ==
Kingo was created by Jack Kirby. He first appeared in The Eternals #11 (May 1977). Just like all the other Eternals, Kirby created him as a mixture of science fiction mixed with classic mythology. Similarly to what he did when he created the New Gods for DC Comics in 1971.

== Fictional character biography ==
Like all other Eternals, Sunen was created by the Celestials around a million years ago on earth in early humanity. Like others of his species he was created as a result of the many genetic experiments the Celestials did on Earth-616. Another of these experiments is the devious Deviants who are also the primary antagonists of Eternals.

Kingo spent centuries in Japan learning the ways of the samurai, and is a skilled swordsman. In the present day and age, he has parlayed his skills into becoming an action film star in Japan.

He later reappeared, after Sprite's mindwiping of the Eternals, once again, as a major Japanese film icon, now an actor, director, and producer, who is making a film in San Francisco starring the Blob, finding himself drawn to the Dreaming Celestial.

== Powers and abilities ==
Kingo Sunen presumably has all the typical powers of Eternals—immortality, super-strength, flight, energy projection, and molecular manipulation. However, he eschews the use of these powers in battle, preferring to fight in the traditional manner of the Samurai. Kingo uses a sword forged by the Eternal Phastos that can cut through nearly any material.

== In other media ==
- Kingo appears in the Marvel Cinematic Universe (MCU) film Eternals, portrayed by Kumail Nanjiani. This version was sent to Earth with other Eternals to save humanity from the Deviants, but they disbanded when they felt that the Deviant threat had abated. Subsequently, Kingo became a popular Bollywood film star; to hide his immortality, portrayed himself as the descendants of the "original" Kingo over the course of multiple generations.
- An alternate universe version of the MCU version of Kingo appears in the What If...? episode "What If... Agatha Went to Hollywood?", voiced by Kumail Nanjiani. After Agatha Harkness absorbs the power of the Eternals, Tiamut, and Arishem, becoming a Celestial, Kingo convinces Harkness to live as a celebrity with him and "inspire" humanity.
- Kingo appears in Marvel: Future Fight.
