= Interloper (comics) =

Publication information
- Publisher: Marvel Comics
- First appearance: Defenders #147 (September 1985)
- Created by: Peter B. Gillis; Don Perlin

In-story information
- Alter ego: Betilakk
- Team affiliations: Eternals
- Abilities: Superhuman strength, stamina, durability, speed, agility, and reflexes; Accelerated healing; Energy manipulation; Psychokinesis; Immortality; Flight

Betilakk the Interloper is a character appearing in American comic books published by Marvel Comics. Created by writer Peter B. Gillis and artist Don Perlin, the character first appeared in Defenders #147 (September 1985). Interloper is a member of the Eternals of Earth who largely distances himself from his fellow Eternals, maintaining a close friendship only with Gilgamesh. One of his principal adversaries is the Dragon of the Moon, whom he battles on several occasions, including alongside the Eternals of Titan. Believing he had fought his final battle, Interloper subsequently withdrew from public life and lived in isolation.

== Publication history ==
Betilakk the Interloper debuted in Defenders #147 (September 1985), created by Peter B. Gillis and Don Perlin. He subsequently appeared in several Marvel series, including Strange Tales (1987), Doctor Strange: Sorcerer Supreme (1988), Doctor Strange Epic Collection (2016), and Doctor Strange, Sorcerer Supreme Omnibus (2017).

Additionally, Interloper received an entry in the Official Handbook of the Marvel Universe Deluxe Edition #6 (1983).

== Fictional character biography ==
Little has been revealed. He does know the Eternal Gilgamesh (aka the Forgotten One), and has been fighting the Dragon of the Moon for centuries, both on Saturn's moon Titan and on Earth. Their last battle was during the 6th Century AD.

He lived as a hermit for the following hundreds of years. He was discovered by Manslaughter, and, impressed, the Interloper trained Manslaughter. Later, when the Dragon of the Moon enslaved Moondragon, the Interloper confronted and then joined Moondragon's team, the Defenders, in battling Moondragon and the Dragon of the Moon. In the battle, the Interloper tried to hurl his life force against the Dragon; he was transformed into a statue that crumbled into dust. Due to the intervention of the Vishanti, Interloper's life force was merged with the body of Will Fanshawe, a Welsh truck driver; they share possession of this body, which can now transform into an exact duplicate of Interloper's old body that retains his Eternal powers. Less than two years later, Interloper defeated the Dragon of the Moon by using his new schema to his advantage.

== Powers and abilities ==
Interloper possesses the standard abilities of his race, including virtual immortality, superhuman strength, durability, levitation, flight, and the projection of cosmic energy beams from his eyes. He is capable of lifting approximately 40 tons under optimal conditions. Interloper wears a mystical artifact known as the Cloak of Fear, which induces unease in nearby humans and prevents them from looking directly at or approaching him. The origins of the cloak have not been disclosed in published stories. Furthermore, he developed a heightened extrasensory awareness of the Dragon of the Moon, enabling him to sense the creature’s presence anywhere on Earth and track it across great distances.
