= Gods (comics) =

Gods or God, in comics, may refer to:

  - New Gods
  - Olympian Gods (comics)
  - Young Gods (comics)
- God (Image Comics)

== See also ==
- Gods (disambiguation)
- God (disambiguation)
