= Olympus (comics) =

Olympus, in comics, may refer to:

- Olympus (Marvel Comics), the home of the Greek Gods in Marvel Comics
- Olympus, the home of the DC Comics' Olympian Gods (DC Comics)
- Olympus (Image Comics), a 2009 series from Image Comics

It may also refer to:

- Olympia (comics), a Marvel Comics location and home of the Eternals
- Olympian (character), a DC Comics superhero

== See also ==
- Olympus (disambiguation)
- Olympian Gods (comics)
