= Red Raven Comics =

- First and last issue of Red Raven Comics

Publication information
- Publisher: Timely Publications
- Schedule: Monthly
- Format: Ongoing series
- Genre: Superhero
- Publication date: August 1940
- No. of issues: 1
- Main character: Red Raven

Creative team
- Written by: Joe Simon, Martin A. Bursten
- Artist(s): Jack Kirby, Dick Briefer, Louis Cazeneuve, Robert Louis Golden

Red Raven Comics was a title of Timely Comics (the predecessor of Marvel Comics). Only a single issue was published, cover-dated August 1940. It was replaced by the title The Human Torch, which began with issue #2 (Fall 1940), continuing the numbering inherited from Red Raven Comics. According to the Grand Comics Database, Red Raven Comics issue #1 contained no advertisements for issue #2 (instead, other titles were advertised), suggesting that the decision to cancel the title may have been made before the first issue went to press.

After this issue, the title character, avian superman Red Raven, did not appear in print again until 1968. The first Human Top was also introduced in this issue, as was a character named Mercury, presented as the Roman god but later retconned to be Makkari, one of the Eternals. Also introduced were Magar the Mystic, the all-seeing Eternal Brain, space adventurer Comet Pierce, and hapless policeman Officer O'Krime. None of these characters were continued in the Human Torch title. The Human Top had one other appearance, in 1942 in Tough Kid Squad.

Red Raven Comics #1 figured in the documentary Comic-Con Episode IV: A Fan's Hope, part of which follows comic-book vendor Chuck Rozanski's futile quest to sell a copy for $500,000.
