= Druig =

Marvel Comics fictional character created by Jack Kirby

- Druig. Art by Daniel Acuña.

Publication information
- Publisher: Marvel Comics
- First appearance: The Eternals #11 (May 1977)
- Created by: Jack Kirby

In-story information
- Alter ego: Druig
- Team affiliations: Eternals; Vorozheika
- Notable aliases: Ivan Druig, Druig of Nightmares
- Abilities: Superhuman speed, strength and physical resistance, Accelerated healing, Cosmic energy manipulation, Energy blasts, Flight, Illusion generation, Matter transmutation, Teleportation.

Druig is a character appearing in American comic books published by Marvel Comics. The character first appeared in The Eternals #11 (May 1977) and was created by Jack Kirby. He is depicted as a member of the superhuman race the Eternals.

Druig was portrayed by Barry Keoghan in the Marvel Cinematic Universe film Eternals (2021).

== Publication history ==
Druig first appeared in The Eternals #11 (May 1977) and was created by Jack Kirby.

== Fictional character biography ==
Druig is the son of Valkin and cousin to Ikaris. In modern times, Druig serves as an agent of the KGB in Russia and finds that he enjoys torturing people. Druig plans to kill Ziran the Tester, but Ikaris disintegrates Druig before he can attack.

=== Eternals (2006) ===
Druig is resurrected in the form of a human and becomes deputy Prime Minister of Vorozheika (a former territory of the USSR) under the alias Ivan Druig. Druig hires Sersi to organize a party at the Vorozheikan embassy, then stages an attack on the party. However, Druig's troops betray him, causing him to lose control of the situation. Around the same time, Druig's proximity to Makkari and Thena causes his powers to reactivate.

Druig retakes control of Vorozheika and captures everyone involved in the riot. He then leaves to find the other Eternals and help them prevent the Dreaming Celestial from destroying Earth.

== Powers and abilities ==
Druig possesses the conventional abilities of an Eternal. He can manipulate all forms of matter and energy, including the atoms of his own body, teleport, control the minds of others, project energy from his body (usually from the hands or eyes), and manipulate gravity to fly.

== Reception ==
- In 2021, CBR.com ranked Druig 15th in their "15 Most Powerful Eternals" list.
- In 2021, CBR.com ranked Druig 9th in their "10 Strongest Characters From Eternals Comics" list.

== In other media ==
- Druig appears in Marvel Knights: Eternals, voiced by Alex Zahara.
- Druig appears in Eternals, portrayed by Barry Keoghan. This version controls a small community, which he chose over the potential of conquering Earth.
