= Olympian =

Olympian or Olympians may refer to:

== Religion ==
- Twelve Olympians, the principal gods and goddesses in ancient Greek religion
- Olympian spirits, spirits mentioned in books of ceremonial magic

== Fiction ==
- Percy Jackson & the Olympians, fiction series by Rick Riordan
- Olympian (character), name of two fictional characters in DC Comics
- Olympian Gods (DC Comics), group of characters based on ancient Greek religion
- Olympians (Marvel Comics), group of characters based on ancient Greek religion
- The Olympian (novel), by James Oppenheim
- "Olympians" (Heated Rivalry), an episode of the Canadian television series

== Sports ==
- Olympic Games or Olympiad participants
- Beijing Olympians, a Chinese professional men's basketball team
- Indianapolis Olympians, NBA team in Indianapolis, Indiana, 1949–1953
- London Olympians, a British amateur American football team
- World Olympians Association, an association of former Olympic athletes

== Transportation ==
- Olympian (automobile), built by the Olympian Motors Company, 1917–21
- Olympian (sidewheeler), a steamboat, 1884–1890
- Olympian Hiawatha, a former passenger train of the Milwaukee Road
- Leyland-MCW Olympian, a single deck bus
- Leyland Olympian, a double decker bus
- Volvo Olympian, a double decker bus built by Volvo, 1992–2000

== Music ==
- Olympians (band), a Greek garage pop band
- Olympian (album), by British rock band Gene, or the title song, 1995
- "Olympian", a song by ASAP Ferg from the mixtape Still Striving, 2017
- "Olympian", a song by Playboi Carti from the album Music, 2025
- "The Olympian", a song by Skids from the album Days in Europa, 1979

== Other uses ==
- Olympia, Greece, denizens of this city
- Olympia, Washington, denizens of this city
- Olympian City, a shopping and residential complex in Tai Kok Tsui, Kowloon, Hong Kong
- Olympian High School, a public high school in San Diego County, California
- Olympian Publishing, a publishing house with offices in Chicago
- The Olympian, a newspaper in Olympia, Washington
- The Olympians, an opera by Arthur Bliss

== See also ==
- Olympus (disambiguation)
