= Olympian Gods (comics) =

In comics, Olympian Gods may refer to:

- Olympian Gods (DC Comics)
- Olympians (Marvel Comics)

It may also refer to:

- Olympian (character), a DC Comics superhero

== See also ==
- Olympian (disambiguation)
- Olympus (comics), a number of locations and series
