= List of species and races in the Marvel Cinematic Universe =

The Marvel Cinematic Universe (MCU) is an American media franchise and shared universe centered on superhero films and television series starring various titular superheroes independently produced by Marvel Studios: based on characters that appear in American comic books published by Marvel Comics. The shared universe, much like the original Marvel Universe in comic books, was established by crossing over common plot elements, settings, cast, and characters. Due to the galaxy-spanning nature of the franchise, multiple species and races have been introduced.

== Alien species ==
=== Asgardians ===
The Asgardians (based on the Marvel Comics race of the same name), or the Æsir - introduced in Thor, are the inhabitants of Asgard, on whom the gods of Norse mythology are based in MCU mythology. In the first film, they are shown as a race of superhuman extraterrestrials who look similar to humans but possess a highly advanced form of technology resembling magic and sorcery, upon which their entire civilization is built. However, later films contradict this, with Thor: Love and Thunder establishing that Thor and Zeus are actual gods in the fictional universe. The film's post-credit scene also confirms the existence of Valhalla in the Marvel universe.

The Asgardians are shown suffering major losses, first during Hela's attempt to harness Asgard's power in Thor: Ragnarok, and later by Thanos on his quest to retrieve the Tesseract, as revealed in Avengers: Infinity War. A group of survivors escape to Earth, and build a settlement under the rule of King Valkyrie.

They appear in the following films - Thor, The Avengers, Thor: The Dark World, Avengers: Age of Ultron, Doctor Strange, Thor: Ragnarok, Avengers: Infinity War, Avengers: Endgame and Thor: Love and Thunder; as well as the ABC series Agents of S.H.I.E.L.D., the Disney+ television series Loki, What If...?, and Marvel Zombies (2025).

=== Celestials ===
Celestials (based on the Marvel Comics race of the same name) are an ancient race of entities introduced in Guardians of the Galaxy and later expanded upon on Guardians of the Galaxy Vol. 2 and Eternals as beings with vast matter and energy manipulation abilities.

- In Guardians of the Galaxy, they are introduced as being present in the universe long before the galactic communities and even the Asgardians. Their origin and nature are not elaborated upon. Whatever is known about them is known only by a few characters, such as Taneleer Tivan, who reveals that the Celestials utilized the Infinity Stones as a means of power against lesser life forms. The severed head of a deceased Celestial, which was converted into Knowhere, appears in these films: Guardians of the Galaxy, Avengers: Infinity War, The Guardians of the Galaxy Holiday Special and Guardians of the Galaxy Vol. 3.
- Eson the Searcher is shown in a flashback sequence as a former owner of the Power Stone in Guardians of the Galaxy. He uses its power to level the surface of an entire planet.
- In Guardians of the Galaxy Vol. 2, Ego the Living Planet is a Celestial who controls a humanoid avatar to travel the universe. His planetary form is a living extension of his Celestial consciousness. Over the course of many years, he plants thousands of alien-seedlings to expand his existence across all life sustaining worlds. However, Ego needs another Celestial's assistance to activate them, so he fathers children with various alien races and had Yondu Udonta retrieve them which meant he could gauge their Celestial powers. Peter Quill is the only child who gains his father's Celestial abilities, though he loses them after killing Ego and foiling his plans.
- In Eternals, Arishem the Celestial is revealed to have planted seeds of other Celestials in planets with life for millions of years, and created and dispatched Deviants and Eternals to prepare the planets for their birth. After the Eternals of Earth defy his orders and stop the birth of Celestial Tiamut, their remaining members are taken away by Arishem for judgement.
- Celestials also appear in the film Thor: Love and Thunder and the Disney+ animated series What If...?.

=== Chitauri ===
The Chitauri (based on the Marvel Comics race of the same name) are a powerful, reptilian warrior race, introduced in The Avengers as a hybrid between organic beings and machines. They have a caste-like society, with each caste (nearly a different species in itself) fulfilling a different role in Chitauri society. They are in league with Thanos through his vizier, a hooded being called "the Other". They are presented as a race of grey-skinned, six-fingered reptilian humanoids that have a bio-mechanical physiology and superhuman attributes. Their technology ranges from hovercraft-like skimmers and Necrocraft, to living airborne troop carriers called Leviathans, all neurally linked with a mothership.

- In The Avengers, the Other, acting on behalf of Thanos, lends the Chitauri to Loki for the invasion of Earth, leading to the Battle of New York. While they eventually overwhelm the Avengers, Iron Man destroys the mothership with a hijacked nuclear missile with the invading forces dropping dead instantly from the mental feedback.
- In Guardians of the Galaxy, the Other briefly appears where he contacts Ronan the Accuser and Nebula about Gamora's betrayal, and also calls them to the Sanctuary on behalf of Thanos. Once the two of them appear, Ronan argues his case to Thanos while The Other scolds him for his failure, and is then promptly killed by Ronan. Additionally, a Chitauri soldier is also seen as a prisoner in the Collector's museum.
- In Avengers: Age of Ultron, Chitauri technology is being studied and used by a Hydra faction led by Baron Strucker– many of his troops wear suits and use weapons made of Chitauri armor, and Strucker's hidden lab houses the remains of a Leviathan. Furthermore, as first hinted in the psychological trauma shown in Iron Man 3 and augmented by Scarlet Witch's powers giving him a nightmarish vision, Tony Stark is fearful that the Chitauri may eventually return to Earth, which leads to his rash actions in creating Ultron.
- In Spider-Man: Homecoming, alongside the technology of the Dark Elves and Stark Industries, the Chitauri technology is used by Adrian Toomes and his cohorts, who steal it from Damage Control and modify it into weapons to sell on the black market, and to forge technology such as Vulture's flight suit and Shocker's gauntlets.
- In Avengers: Infinity War, the Chitauri are Thanos' enforcers in his mission to obtain the Infinity Stones. It is also revealed in a flashback that the Chitauri took part in the invasion of Gamora's home planet when she was a child, resulting in her being taken in by Thanos.
- In an alternate version of the Battle of New York shown in Avengers: Endgame, Chitauri are seen fighting as they did in the original depiction of the battle. In present-day 2023, alternate versions of the Chitauri and their Leviathans are brought to fight in the Battle of Earth. While some Chitauri and Leviathans are slain, the rest are taken out by Iron Man using the Stark Gauntlet.
- They also appear in the Disney+ series Loki (archival footage), What If...?, and Hawkeye (flashback).

=== Clandestines ===
The Clandestines (based on the Marvel Comics storyline ClanDestine) are a group who claim to be Djinn that were exiled from their home Noor dimension. Their presence on Earth is shown to be tied to the background of the family of series protagonist Kamala Khan. Kamala's great-grandmother Aisha is revealed to be a former Clandestines in a flashback sequence set in the period up to the Partition of India. In 1942, Aisha leaves the group, falls in love with a human man named Hasan, and gives birth to Sana, Kamala's grandmother. In 1947, the other Clandestines find Aisha, and their leader, Najma, kills her. The other members include Fariha, Aadam, Saleem, and Kamran, who tries to protect Kamala from the other Clandestines when they attempt to forcibly use her to return home.

As of 2026, the Clandestines have appeared in one project: the Disney+ series Ms. Marvel (2022).

=== Deviants ===
Deviants (based on the Marvel Comics race of the same name) are a race created by the Celestial Arishem. Like Eternals, they are sent to planets to ensure the development of intelligent life, creating the necessary conditions to birth a Celestial. Deviants achieve this by eliminating the apex predators of planets, allowing populations to grow. But unlike Eternals, Deviants evolve from absorbing traits from those they killed and eventually become a threat to intelligent life themselves. Eternals are revealed to have been sent as replacements with the additional mission to eliminate Deviants. On Earth, Deviants are believed to have been eliminated by Eternals led by Ajak in 1521, until their resurgence in 2024. The Deviant leader, Kro, kills Eternals Ajak and Gilgamesh and absorbs their abilities to gradually evolve into a sapient being until being killed by Thena.

As of 2026, Deviants have appeared in one project: the film Eternals.

=== Dwarves ===
Dwarves (based on the Marvel Comics race of the same name) are an ancient race of skilled forgers and blacksmiths hailing from the realm of Nidavellir. They are ruled by King Eitri. They are close allies of the Asgardians, and after being asked by Odin, forged Mjolnir. In 2018, when Thor, Rocket, and Groot arrive on Nidavellir, they find Eitri, who informs them that Thanos killed the rest of the Dwarves after they forged the Infinity Gauntlet for him.

As of 2026, Dwarves have appeared in two projects: the film Avengers: Infinity War; and the Disney+ animated series What If...?.

=== Elves ===
Elves (based on the Marvel Comics race of the same name) are two separate races, the Dark Elves of Svartalfheim, and the Light Elves of Alfheim.

In Thor: The Dark World, the Dark Elves, as with their enemies the Asgardians, are depicted as ancient astronauts. It is stated that they existed in the primordial darkness that predated the current vibrant state of the universe. Their goal is stated as destroying the current universe and returning existence back to that state. They were believed extinct, but unbeknownst to the Asgardians, Malekith and a number of warriors escaped and went into stasis in deep space until another attempt would be possible. For the film, David J. Peterson created a language for the Dark Elves called Shiväisith. In Guardians of the Galaxy, an imprisoned Dark Elf appears as an exhibit in Taneleer Tivan's museum. In Spider-Man: Homecoming, Dark Elf technology that was salvaged from the Battle of Greenwich was used by Tinkerer alongside the technologies from the Chitauri and Stark Industries.

Runa, a Light Elf with shape shifting abilities, appears in She-Hulk: Attorney at Law. After impersonating various people including Megan Thee Stallion, she is caught and sentenced to pay damages and serve a 60 day sentence.

Elves also appear in the Disney+ series Loki (archival footage) and What If...?.

=== Eternals ===
Eternals (based on the Marvel Comics race of the same name) are an immortal race of superpowered synthetic beings appearing in the film of the same name. They are revealed to have been created by the Celestials at the World Forge to rid planets of Deviants in order to ensure the continual growth of their native populations, allowing new Celestials to "emerge" when the time comes. A group of ten Eternals—Ajak, Sersi, Ikaris, Kingo, Sprite, Phastos, Makkari, Druig, Gilgamesh, and Thena—are sent to Earth on their starship, the Domo, by Arishem in 5000 BC, where they help humanity progress while refraining from interfering in human conflicts. In the present day, this group of Eternals rebel once they learn of their true purpose, with Ajak being betrayed by Ikaris and her and Gilgamesh both being killed by Deviants in the process. Sersi replaces Ajak as the team's leader and activates the Uni-Mind, successfully preventing the Celestial Tiamut from being born and destroying the planet. A guilt-ridden Ikaris, who had vowed to uphold Arishem's instructions but was unable to bring himself to kill Sersi, flies into the Sun, while Sprite is turned into a human.

As of 2026, the Eternals have appeared in three projects: the film Eternals; and the Disney+ animated series What If...? and Marvel Zombies.

=== Flerken ===
The Flerken (based on the Marvel Comics race of the same name) are stated to be alien creatures that completely resemble Earth's cats in appearance and behavior, but are shown to possess human-level intelligence. They have tentacles that come out of their mouths and can swallow up large objects and store them in pocket dimensions in their bellies. Flerken also have longevity. In 1995, the Flerken Goose accompanies Carol Danvers and Nick Fury on their mission, where she demonstrates her abilities by defeating Kree soldiers and swallowing the Tesseract. Later, she stays with Fury. In 2026, Goose gives birth to numerous offsprings which help with the evacuation of the collapsing S.A.B.E.R. station.

As of 2026, the Flerken have appeared in two projects: the films Captain Marvel (2019) and The Marvels (2023).

=== Frost Giants ===
The Frost Giants (based on the Marvel Comics race Giants) are a race of 10 ft. tall humanoid beings that inhabit the frozen, barren realm Jotunheim. They are ruled by Laufey, king of the Frost Giants, who is also Loki's biological father. Small and weak for a Frost Giant, Loki is abandoned by his father in a temple, and left to die. In 965 A.D., shortly after the war between the Giants and the Asgardians, Loki is found by King Odin and raised as his son.

As of 2026, Frost Giants have appeared in eight projects: the films Thor, The Avengers, Thor: The Dark World, Thor: Ragnarok, Avengers: Infinity War, and Avengers: Endgame; and the Disney+ series Loki and What If...?.

=== Inhumans ===
The Inhuman Royal Family from the TV show Inhumans

The Inhumans (based on the Marvel Comics race of the same name) are introduced in the second season of Agents of S.H.I.E.L.D., with further development in the third season. They were created by the Kree, with experiments with the Inhumans dating back to the Maya civilization when a Mayan hunter was turned into Hive. The Alpha Primitives appeared in the show's third season, though they are referred to simply as "Primitives". This version of the Primitives are the result of Hive and Holden Radcliffe's failed experiments to turn humans into Inhumans through a pathogen created from a combination of Terrigen Crystals, the blood of Daisy Johnson and a Kree Reaper, and Hive's own parasitic organism. While the Primitives have enhanced strength and infrared sensory capabilities, they also retain the skills they had before their transformation.

An eight-episode live-action television series, titled Marvel's Inhumans, premiered on ABC after the first two episodes were screened in IMAX theaters for two weeks beginning on September 1, 2017. IMAX is also a financial partner for Inhumans, and this was the first time a television series premiered in IMAX. The series centered on Black Bolt and other members of the Royal Family (Medusa, Maximus, Karnak, Gorgon, Crystal, Triton, and Auran), and was not intended to be a reworking of the planned film from Marvel Studios, nor a spin-off of Agents of S.H.I.E.L.D. Scott Buck served as showrunner and executive producer on the series. The series was panned by both fans and critics alike, and was canceled after one season.

A trade report in March 2011 said Marvel Entertainment was developing an Inhumans film. In November 2012, Stan Lee reported that the film is in development. In August 2014, it was reported that Marvel was moving forward with the development of an Inhumans film, with a screenplay written by Joe Robert Cole. In October 2014, Marvel Studios confirmed Inhumans, with a release date of November 2, 2018, and with Vin Diesel openly attached to the role of Black Bolt shortly after the film's announcement, despite already having a role in the Marvel Cinematic Universe as Groot. The date was later pushed back to July 12, 2019. By October 2015, Cole was no longer involved with the film and any potential drafts that he may have written would not be used. In April 2016, the film was taken off of Marvel's 2019 release schedule for unknown reasons, though it is not considered canceled. In July 2016, producer Kevin Feige said Inhumans would "certainly" be a part of the discussion regarding the film ideas for 2020 and 2021, adding the following November that he was still optimistic the film could be released in Phase Four, but had since not commented on the reason for the film's removal from its slate. Since then, there have been no further updates regarding the film's development, leaving the project in limbo.

- Anson Mount reprised his role as Black Bolt in the film Doctor Strange in the Multiverse of Madness (2022) as a version of Black Bolt from Earth-838 who is a member of the Illuminati.
- In The Marvels (2023), S.A.B.E.R.'s file on Kamala Khan states she has Inhuman heritage.

=== Kree ===
The Kree (based on the Marvel Comics race of the same name) are a militaristic race of mostly blue-skinned humanoids from the planet Hala, first featured in the ABC series Agents of S.H.I.E.L.D.. One of the most technically advanced races in the galaxy, the Kree are skilled in genetic engineering and are responsible for the creation of the Inhumans on Earth.

- The species made its cinematic debut in Guardians of the Galaxy, with Ronan the Accuser and Korath the Pursuer. The Kree Empire is stated to have just signed a peace treaty with the Nova Corps of Xandar, thereby ending a centuries-long war between the two races. This treaty prompts the radical Ronan to embark on a renegade campaign of genocide against all Xandarians, before being defeated and killed by the Guardians of the Galaxy.
- The Kree briefly appear in Guardians of the Galaxy Vol. 2, where their planet Hala is nearly destroyed by Ego.
- They next appear in Captain Marvel. Lee Pace and Djimon Hounsou reprise their roles as Ronan and Korath, and are joined by Yon-Rogg, Minn-Erva, Att-Lass, and Bron-Char, who are members of the Kree military team Starforce. Mar-Vell and the Supreme Intelligence also appear in the film. Yon-Rogg comes to Earth when the Kree discovers that Mar-Vell is working on a light-speed engine experiment as well as harboring some Skrulls. When Mar-Vell dies in a crash with Carol Danvers and Yon-Rogg arrives, Danvers shoots the engine and gets exposed to its energies. After a blood transfusion from Yon-Rogg, Danvers' memories are altered and she works under him and the Supreme Intelligence. Danvers returns to Earth following an encounter with the Skrulls led by Talos. On a parley with Talos, Danvers learns of what the Kree did to the Skrulls and their homeworld. After removing the damper from her head, Danvers uses her powers to fight the Kree forces, resulting in most of them either being killed or incapacitated. Yon-Rogg is sent back to Hala to relay Danvers's message to the Supreme Intelligence.
- The Kree also appear in The Marvels, as well as the Disney+ animated series What If...?.

=== Outriders ===
The Outriders (based on the Marvel Comics race of the same name) are mindless, feral aliens utilized by Thanos in his army, first appearing in Avengers: Infinity War, in which they invade Wakanda. Alternate versions of the Outriders appear in Avengers: Endgame at the ruins of the Avengers Compound in upstate New York, but are disintegrated at the end.

The non-canon novel Thanos: Titan Consumed states that the Outriders were created by Thanos, who combined samples of DNA from the Chitauri, himself, and of various species that he has killed.

=== Sakaarans ===
Sakaarans, also known as Sakaarians, are a sentient insectoid race native to the planet Sakaar.

- They make their first appearance in Guardians of the Galaxy, working for Ronan the Accuser. A maskless member of the race is portrayed by James Gunn.
- A separate type, larva-like creatures, appears in Thor: Ragnarok, Thor: Love and Thunder, and Avengers: Endgame, in the form of Miek.
- They also appear in the Disney+ animated series What If...?.

=== Skrulls ===
The Skrulls (based on the Marvel Comics race of the same name) are a race of extraterrestrial shapeshifters hailing from the planet Skrullos. As of 1995, Talos (portrayed by Ben Mendelsohn) is the leader of the Skrulls. A faction of Skrulls led by Talos are victims of a genocidal war waged by the Kree, having come to Earth to seek the aid of renegade Kree scientist Mar-Vell in devising a light-speed engine that could take the Skrulls to safety. After Kree warrior "Vers" learns of her true identity as Carol Danvers, she helps defend Talos and the other Skrull refugees from a Kree attack before they leave Earth to find a new planet to settle on. In 2023, a Skrull posing as an FBI agent informs Monica Rambeau that an "old friend" of her mother would like to meet her. In 2024, Talos and his wife Soren pose as Nick Fury and Maria Hill on Earth while the real Fury works with a group of Skrulls in space.

By 2026, Talos has been removed from his leadership role and a rogue Skrull faction led by Gravik is formed on a base, New Skrullos, in Russia with intentions to take Earth as their new home. Talos calls Fury for help and he returns from space, learning that rogue Skrulls have kidnapped world officials and replaced them, including James Rhodes and Everett Ross. Talos tells him that following the Blip, he summoned one million Skrull refugees to live on Earth. Angry that Fury failed on his promise to take care of them, Gravik orchestrates several terroristic attacks across many continents, kills Hill, Talos and other Skrulls that try to rebel against him, and attempts to instigate World War III. He and G'iah, Talos' daughter, use a machine to acquire the DNA from members of the Avengers, the Guardians of the Galaxy, the Black Order, and other enhanced individuals and become Super-Skrulls. G'iah ultimately kills Gravik, Fury kills Raava, Rhodes' imposter, and the rogue faction becomes defunct. In response to the invasion, the U.S. President initiates the Anti-Alien Act deeming Skrulls and other aliens public enemies. G'iah is recruited into MI6, while Fury's wife, Varra, joins him in space with S.A.B.E.R. By 2026, Skrull refugees live in the planet Tarnax and made a peace conversation with the Kree, organized by Fury, but before the arrival of Danvers, Monica Rambeau and Kamala Khan, the treaty was dissolved. After Kree leader Dar-Benn makes a jump point with a Quantum Band by mining Tarnax's atmosphere into Hala to restore its air, the remaining Skrulls were evacuated and taken away by Valkyrie.

As of 2026, Skrulls have appeared in eight projects: the films Captain Marvel, Spider-Man: Far From Home (2019), and The Marvels; and the Disney+ series WandaVision (2021), Loki, What If...?, Secret Invasion (2023), and Marvel Zombies.

=== Sovereign ===
The Sovereign are a golden-skinned humanoid race that has advanced through genetic engineering and live on the amalgamation of planets of the same name, later revealed to be creations of the High Evolutionary. They are led by Ayesha, the Golden High Priestess. She later oversees the birth of the latest member of the race—Adam Warlock, who she intends to use as a weapon against the Guardians.

As of 2026, the Sovereign have appeared in three projects: the films Guardians of the Galaxy Vol. 2 and Guardians of the Galaxy Vol. 3; and the Disney+ animated series What If...?.

=== Symbiotes ===
The symbiotes are a species of extraterrestrial fluid-like life forms.

As of 2026, the symbiotes have appeared in two projects: the film Spider-Man: No Way Home (2021); and the Disney+ animated series Your Friendly Neighborhood Spider-Man (2025–present).

=== Watchers ===
The Watchers are a race of extraterrestrial, omniscient beings who observe the multiverse.

As of 2026, the Watchers have appeared in two projects: the film Guardians of the Galaxy Vol. 2; and the Disney+ animated series What If...?.

== Terrestrial species ==
=== Moloids ===
The Moloids (based on the Marvel Comics race of the same name) are a race of human-like beings who inhabit the underground society of Subterranea on Earth-828.

As of 2026, they have appeared in two projects: the comic book Fantastic Four: First Steps (2025); and the film The Fantastic Four: First Steps (2025).

=== Mutants ===
The Mutants (based on the Marvel Comics race of the same name), are an enhanced species that, from birth, possess specific genetic mutations that grant them unique superhuman abilities or distinct physical characteristics. Usually, the term mutants refer to Homo superior, a race that came into being by having genetically evolved from humans: however, multiple other species, such as the Talokanil, are able to develop mutations and those individuals would also be classified as mutants and/or mutant hybrids, rendering the general term of mutants as an umbrella term.

As of 2026, they have appeared in seven projects: the Disney+ series Ms. Marvel and She-Hulk: Attorney at Law, and the films Doctor Strange in the Multiverse of Madness, Black Panther: Wakanda Forever, The Marvels, Deadpool & Wolverine, and Spider-Man: Brand New Day. Mutants will appear in the films Avengers: Doomsday, Avengers: Secret Wars and the untitled X-Men film.

=== Talokanil ===
The Talokanil (based on the Marvel Comics race Homo mermanus) are the inhabitants of the underwater kingdom of Talokan. They are descended from an enhanced group of humans from Yucatán who consumed an underwater herb infused with vibranium.

As of 2026, they have appeared in two projects: the film Black Panther: Wakanda Forever; and the Disney+ animated series Marvel Zombies. The Talokanil will appear in the film Avengers: Doomsday.

== Other species ==
Several other species make appearances throughout the MCU, often in the form of a single character. These include:

- Animen
- Cerberi
- Chinese dragons (Great Protector)
- Dragons
- Dhampirs (Blade)
- Flora colossi (Groot)
- Fire Demons of Muspelheim (Surtur)
- Frost Beasts - The Frost Beasts are mammalian/reptilian creatures from Jotunheim that appear in Thor: The Dark World. One Frost Beast was accidentally sent to Earth by Thor. The Secret Invasion episode "Promises" reveals that Gravik's Skrull group has a DNA sample of a Frost Beast.
- Hell Spawn - The Hell Spawn are cyborg uplifted animal creations of the High Evolutionary that first appear in Guardians of the Galaxy Vol. 3. Known members are War Pig, Behemoth, and an unnamed octopus/hyena hybrid.
- Horde
- Humanimals - The Humanimals are uplifted animal creations of the High Evolutionary who reside on Counter-Earth. They are based on the New Men.
- Hundun (Morris)
- Insectoids (Mantis)
- Korbinites
- Kronans (Korg)
- Krylorians (Carina, Bereet)
- Luphomoids (Nebula)
- Mindless Ones
- Minotaur (Rintrah)
- Olympians (Zeus, Hercules, Dionysus)
- Recorders
- Sirens
- Star Children (Phyla)
- Titans (Thanos)
- Vampires
- Vanir (Hogun)
- Werewolves (Jack Russell)
- Xandarians (Kraglin Obfonteri, Irani Rael, Rhomann Dey, Garthan Saal)
- Xeronians
- Zehoberei (Gamora)
- Zombies

== See also ==
- Characters of the Marvel Cinematic Universe
- Features of the Marvel Cinematic Universe
- Teams and organizations of the Marvel Cinematic Universe
