= Ikaris =

Fictional character appearing in Marvel Comics

- Textless cover of Eternals #1 (Aug. 2008). Art by Daniel Acuña.

Publication information
- Publisher: Marvel Comics
- First appearance: The Eternals #1 (July 1976)
- Created by: Jack Kirby

In-story information
- Team affiliations: Eternals; Unlimited Class Wrestling Federation
- Notable aliases: "Iceberg" Ike Harris, Sovereign, Isaac "Ike" Harris, Daedalus
- Abilities: Superhuman strength, speed, stamina, agility, reflexes and durability; Cosmic energy transmutation; Regeneration; Flight; Heat vision; Psionic abilities; Teleportation

Ikaris is a fictional character appearing in American comic books published by Marvel Comics. He first appeared in The Eternals #1 (July 1976) and was created by Jack Kirby. The character is depicted as a member of a race known as the Eternals.

Richard Madden played Ikaris in the Marvel Cinematic Universe, debuting in Eternals (2021).

== Publication history ==
Ikaris first appeared in Eternals #1 (July 1976) and was created by Jack Kirby.

Neil Gaiman, with artist John Romita, Jr., created a 2006 miniseries, which helped bring the Eternals' role in the modern Marvel Universe up-to-date. Originally solicited as a six-issue series, an extra issue was added to the run, because, according to editor Nick Lowe, "There was too much story to fit into the structure we set for ourselves. Neil was starting issue five and told me that he might need a seventh issue. He just had too much story to fit in six issues (even with the first and sixth double-sized)".

== Fictional character biography ==
=== Origins ===
Ikaris was born over 20,000 years ago in Polaria, in the area now known as Siberia. He is the son of the Eternals Virako and Tulayn. His real birth name is unknown.

When the Second Host of the Celestials sank the Deviant Lemuria in what is known as the "Great Cataclysm", Ikaris guides a ship of humans to safety. The humans mistake Ikaris for a bird, and he is memorialized as the dove that guided Noah to the Mountains of Ararat.

=== Early centuries ===
Ikaris chose his name due to a tragic accident hundreds of years ago. While fighting the Deviants in ancient Greece, the man eventually known as Ikaris meets and weds a human woman. Together they bear a son named Icarus, who loves to soar with his father high above the seas and mountains of Greece. In time, the Eternal builds his son mechanical wings so the boy can fly on his own.

When his father disappears while fighting the Deviants, the young Icarus seeks him out using the mechanical wings. Too inexperienced to fly on his own, young Icarus soars too high, loses consciousness in the upper atmosphere, and falls to his death. Finding his son dead, the father Eternal takes the name of his son, Ikaris, in his memory.

Around 1000 AD, Virako, Ikaris' father, dies in battle against the Deviant Dromedan. Ikaris is then adopted by his uncle Valkin, who reveals to him his secret Arctic home, the Pyramid of the Winds.

=== Modern age ===
During the Fourth Host, the arrival of Celestials on Earth, Druig captures and tortures Ikaris to force him to reveal the location of the Pyramid of the Winds. Ikaris catches up with Druig and kills him.

Ikaris becomes a professional wrestler with the Unlimited Class Wrestling Federation as "Iceberg" Ike Harris. Ikaris and fellow Eternal Thena have had a strong dislike for each other for a long time, and find themselves coming to conflict when she is appointed as Prime Eternal. Questioning her worth as Prime Eternal, Ikaris faces her in the Hall of Eternal Judgment and defeats her, becoming the new Prime Eternal.

=== Changed Reality (Eternals mini-series) ===
The Eternals were the victims of memory and reality manipulation by former Eternal Sprite, and thus have forgotten their true identities. Ikaris visited Mark Curry to try to awaken/remember his past but he rebuked him. Although Ikaris (calling himself Ike Harris) was captured and atomized by two Deviants agents, Gelt and Morjak, his body reappears at the bottom of the Antarctic city of Olympia. His body and powers fully restored by the sentient city, Ikaris regains his memories and sets out to awaken his fellow Eternals to their true identities. After a prolonged battle, he at last unites the few Eternals present. He then plans to team up with Makkari and reawaken the ninety other Eternals.

=== Eternals' search (Eternals – Volume 4) ===
Thena and Ikaris find that Druig has a similar mission to their own and is trying to find and convert Eternals to his cause. Ikaris and Thena approach Phastos, who thinks he is an engineer in Sweden named Phillip Voss. Thena tries to trigger his memory with questions about his past under the guise that she and Ikaris are attorneys executing the will of a deceased relative of Voss. This ploy proves to be a failure and Ikaris just wants to force the memories on the Eternals who have lost their memories.

=== Death ===
Later when the Final Host arrived on Earth, Ikaris along with all the Eternals killed themselves after realizing the true purpose for which they were created. He was the last Eternal still alive when Iron Man and Doctor Strange traveled to the Mountains of Greece, to try to get some answers from the Eternals. Before his death, he told the heroes the reason for the mass suicide. Ikaris and the other Eternals are later resurrected simultaneously.

== Powers and abilities ==
Ikaris' life force is augmented by cosmic energy and he has total mental control over his physical form and bodily processes even when he is asleep or unconscious. As a result, he is virtually immortal, immune to disease and aging, and invulnerable to conventional forms of injury. Should Ikaris be injured somehow, he could regenerate any injured or missing tissue. Cosmic energy bolsters Ikaris's metabolism so that he does not tire from any physical exertion. He can resist temperature extremes through mental concentration.

Ikaris can levitate himself by mentally manipulating gravitons around himself. He can also levitate other persons and objects, even while simultaneously levitating himself. Ikaris is able to fly via self-levitation at approximately 850 miles per hour, which is faster than most other Eternals.

Ikaris has low level psychic abilities, enabling him to scan the superficial thoughts of any mind less adept than his own. He can mentally create illusions so as to disguise himself. Ikaris can also psionically manipulate atoms and molecules so as to transform an object's shape. However, Ikaris is only a second-level adept on a five level scale (the fifth level being the highest) in this discipline. He can rearrange molecules in the air so as to create a virtually impenetrable shield about himself.

Ikaris can project cosmic energy in the form of beams from his eyes or beams and flashes from his hands. This cosmic energy, stored in specialized enclaves of cells in his body, can be used as force, heat, light, and possibly other forms of electromagnetic energy. Ikaris can project a maximum concussive force of at least 260 pounds per square inch. He can project heat of a maximum temperature of at least 3,000 Fahrenheit, hot enough to melt iron. It takes about one minute for him to attain this maximum temperature. Because Ikaris's heat beams can vaporize solid objects, they are often called his disintegrator beams, The maximum range for his energy beams is about 200 feet. Ikaris is a fourth level adept on a five-level scale (the fifth level being the highest) in this discipline. The expenditure of cosmic energy in this way continually for several hours will temporarily deplete Ikaris's physical strength, but not his resistance to injury, although it will temporarily increase his sensitivity to pain. He will rapidly return to normal after such lengthy energy expenditure is over.

Ikaris can teleport himself psionically, but prefers not to do so, since, like other Eternals, he finds the self-teleportation process physically unpleasant. He can also teleport other people along with himself.

== Reception ==
- In 2021, CBR.com ranked Ikaris 5th in their "15 Most Powerful Eternals" list.
- In 2021, Screen Rant ranked Ikaris 4th in their "10 Most Powerful Members Of The Eternals" list
- In 2021, CBR.com ranked Ikaris 5th in their "10 Strongest Characters From Eternals Comics" list.

== Other versions ==
=== Marvel 2099 ===
An alternate future version of Ikaris from the Marvel 2099 universe appears in 2099: Manifest Destiny.

=== The Eternal ===
Chuck Austen wrote The Eternal, a 2003-2004 Marvel MAX series which showed the arrival of Ikaris' parents on Earth, in this version Ikaeden and Jeska, and his plan for the story involved "going back in time to see Ikaris birth and development on Earth, meet his parents, and then [we] move forward into contemporary time".

== In other media ==
=== Television ===
Ikaris appears in Marvel Knights: Eternals, voiced by Trevor Devall.

=== Marvel Cinematic Universe ===
- Ikaris appears in Eternals, portrayed by Richard Madden. In the film's story, Ikaris kills Ajak when he realizes that she wants to go against Arishem's plan for the Emergence, which would have destroyed life on Earth. He betrays the rest of the Eternals, but is ultimately brought down by his love for Sersi. Unable to forgive himself, he commits suicide by flying into the sun.
- An alternate universe variant of Ikaris appears in the Disney+ animated television series Marvel Zombies (2025).

=== Video games ===
- Ikaris appears as an unlockable playable character in Marvel Future Fight. An Ikaris costume, based on the MCU character, was later added during a tie-in event to the release of Eternals.
- Ikaris appears as an unlockable playable character in Marvel Contest of Champions.
- Ikaris appears as an unlockable playable character in Marvel Super War.
- Ikaris appears as an unlockable playable character in Marvel Strike Force.
- Ikaris appears as an unlockable playable character in Marvel Puzzle Quest.
- Ikaris appears as a companion character in Marvel Future Revolution.

=== Web series ===
Ikaris appears in Marvel Heroes MMO: Chronicles of Doom, voiced by Wally Wingert.
