= Sprite (Eternal) =

Marvel Comics character

- Sprite as depicted in Eternals (vol. 5) #1 (January 2021). Art by Jeff Johnson.

Publication information
- Publisher: Marvel Comics
- First appearance: The Eternals #9 (March 1977)
- Created by: Jack Kirby

In-story information
- Full name: Sprite
- Species: Eternals
- Team affiliations: Eternals; Deviants
- Notable aliases: Puck; Robin Goodfellow; Colín; Peter Frickin' Pan
- Abilities: Control over cosmic energy allowing energy blasts and invulnerability, Immortality, Vast psionic powers including telepathy, telekinesis, matter transmutation and illusion casting

Sprite is a fictional character appearing in American comic books published by Marvel Comics. The character first appeared in The Eternals #9 (March 1977), and was created by Jack Kirby. Although physically a child, Sprite is an Eternal, a member of an ancient and extremely powerful immortal race, who is commonly depicted as a mischievous trickster figure. Since 2019, Sprite has been depicted as alternatively male and female in comics (via the plot element of rebirth) due to their (then-unreleased) depiction as the latter in the Marvel Cinematic Universe (MCU).

Lia McHugh portrayed Sprite in the 2021 MCU film Eternals, with Hannah Dodd portraying Sprite's illusionary adult form of "Sandra", and Salma Hayek portraying Sprite disguised as Ajak.

== Publication history ==
Sprite first appeared in The Eternals #9 (March 1977), and was created by Jack Kirby.

== Fictional character biography ==
Sprite is an incorrigible trickster and practical joker, and has been for millennia. Claiming to have been both the inspiration for William Shakespeare to write the character of Puck in A Midsummer Night's Dream and for J. M. Barrie to write Peter Pan, Sprite revels in what he sees as "playful" behavior, he is unmindful of the often deadly consequences of his "pranks", especially to fragile "mortal" humans. Though punished time and again for his murderous actions, he always returns to his preferred way of life after a while.

During the Fourth Host of the Celestials, when Zuras calls for the Uni-Mind to examine the Celestials' Mothership, Sprite remains behind with Domo's Central Processor. There, he convinces the imprisoned Forgotten Eternal to help stop an attack to the Celestial ship.

While trying to improve Olympia's systems, Sprite accidentally sends Olympia into the Negative Zone, but the Eternals restore it to its proper place. Sprite later advocates the appointment of the Black Knight as Sersi's Gann Josin (sharing a mental bond) as compromise with Ikaris, who wants her killed.

=== Reality change plan (Eternals vol. 3) ===
In the Eternals miniseries by Neil Gaiman, Sprite, under the "real name" of Colín, was the star of It's Just So Sprite, a sitcom on the Tweenie Channel. Although he presented himself to be unaware of his past or abilities, he also served as a spokesman for Hero Registration (as the series is set during the Civil War event).

Ikaris, who seemed to be the only Eternal with any memory of his past, sees Sprite on television and informs Makkari that Sprite was another Eternal. Later, after Ikaris disappeared and the remaining Eternals started to recover their powers, Curry contacted Sprite, seeking advice. Sprite reveals that he had always known who they both were, and takes them to the Dreaming Celestial, their creator. There, Sprite informs Curry that it was Sprite himself who made all the Eternals forget who they were, took away their powers, and removed all record of them from reality, as revenge for a million years of them treating him like a child and not allowing him to experience the vices of the world – to the extent that they created him as the Eternal 'who would never grow up', trapped in the form of a prepubescent child. Using the Uni-Mind powered by the Dreaming Celestial, Sprite uses his powers to warp reality to his will, making himself a normal human male child, so that he can finally age and experience the vices of the world. Sprite and Makkari are subsequently attacked by Deviants, but Sprite escapes. Sprite was later seen boarding a train to run away from the problems he caused that led to the awakening of the Dreaming Celestial, and was ultimately found by Zuras. Sprite has no apologies for causing the current situation, and, satisfied with the life he lived, although promising vengeance, allows Zuras to kill him by snapping his neck.

=== A new cycle (Eternals vol. 5) ===
Following the mass suicidal event that caused all Eternals to die after learning the truth of their origin, they were all reborn simultaneously due to their eternal (both species and longevity-wise) nature. Resurrected in an amnesiac female body, Sprite is taken in by Ikaris, traveling around New York and subduing Deviants. When they both came back from their trip to New York City, they were suspects in the murder of Zuras. Sprite and Ikaris tracked the murderer's trail to the ruined city of Titanos where they encountered the Mad Titan Thanos. Upon learning of their role in the events ultimately leading to the death of the Eternals and their own subsequent death at Zuras' hands, Sprite is intrigued.

== Powers and abilities ==
Sprite, like all Eternals, has total control over his body's life force and molecular structure, making him virtually immortal; in addition to not aging, Eternals are immune to all known diseases and toxins, radiation, and extremes of temperature. His Eternal body has the appearance of a pre-adolescent child but he is, in fact, hundreds of thousands of years old.

Sprite is able to channel cosmic radiation into blasts of heat or force, levitate himself and others, and create illusions. He has superhuman strength, though because of his small size and childlike anatomy it is less than that of most Eternals. He is capable of rearranging atoms and molecules in such a way as to radically restructure objects (once creating a working ground-to-orbit spacecraft in seconds), and is second only to Sersi in the art of molecular reconstruction.

Sprite, in his former incarnation, successfully used the reality-warping powers of the Dreaming Celestial to provide himself with a human body that would have aged to adulthood normally, if not for his demise.

== Reception ==
In 2021, CBR.com ranked Sprite 10th in their "10 Strongest Characters From Eternals Comics" list.

== In other media ==
=== Television ===
Sprite appears in Marvel Knights: Eternals, voiced by Sam Vincent.

=== Film ===
- Sprite appears in the Marvel Cinematic Universe (MCU) film Eternals (2021), portrayed by Lia McHugh. This version is a genetically-engineered, synthetic being made out of cosmic energy by the Celestial Arishem who has the appearance of an adolescent girl. She later uses the Uni-Mind's power to become human, losing her powers and immortality and allowing her to age into an adult.
  - Hannah Dodd portrays Sprite in the illusionary adult form of "Sandra", which she uses to date adults without them thinking her to be a child.
