= Forgotten One (character) =

Character from Marvel Comics

Gilgamesh
- The Forgotten One on Daniel Acuña's cover of Eternals #5 (Dec. 2008)

Publication information
- Publisher: Marvel Comics
- First appearance: The Eternals #13 (July 1977)
- Created by: Jack Kirby

In-story information
- Team affiliations: Eternals; Avengers
- Notable aliases: Gil, Hero of Sumer, Lost Eternal, Beloved of the Muses, Dragon-Slayer, Forgotten Nemesis, Beast of Legend, King Gilgamesh
- Abilities: Superhuman strength, stamina, agility, reflexes, and durability Regenerative healing factor Flight; Optic blasts Repressed aging Immunity to disease

The Forgotten One (also known as Hero and Gilgamesh) is a fictional character appearing in American comic books published by Marvel Comics. He first appeared in The Eternals #13 (July 1977) and was created by Jack Kirby. He is a member of the near-immortal hidden race known as the Eternals. He has also been a member of the Avengers.

Don Lee portrayed Gilgamesh in the Marvel Cinematic Universe, debuting in Eternals (2021).

== Publication history ==
The Forgotten One was created by Jack Kirby, and first appeared in The Eternals #13 (July 1977).

== Fictional character biography ==
During his millennia of activity, the Forgotten One has used the names of or been mistaken for numerous heroes of myth and legend, including Gilgamesh and Hercules. He became an outcast from his fellow Eternals when their ruler, Zuras, decreed that he had been too proud a meddler in the mortal world and confined him to a sector of Olympus. Sprite convinced him to come out of exile and journey to the mother-ship of the Fourth Host of the Celestials to assist the Eternals in battle against the Deviants.

After this battle, he was renamed Hero by the One Above All, the chief of the Celestials, who had created the Eternals and Deviants. After losing a battle with Thor, Hero and the other Eternals assist Thor in battling the Celestials to prevent them from destroying humanity.

When the membership of the Avengers is virtually emptied, the Forgotten One joins them for a time. He renames himself Gilgamesh, donning a costume that resembles the hide of the Bull of Heaven. Gilgamesh assists the Avengers in their struggle with the Lava Men and is severely injured during the battle. Gilgamesh is brought to the Eternals' home of Olympia, which had temporarily fallen into the Negative Zone, to recover from his injuries.

Gilgamesh returns to Avengers Mansion during "The Crossing" crossover event, only to be killed by Neut, an agent of Immortus. It was later shown that Gilgamesh is alive and once again associated with his fellow Eternals. He had lost his memory because a reality change created by Sprite and had begun working as a strongman in Brazil.

== Powers and abilities ==
The Forgotten One is a member of the Eternal race and possesses a number of superhuman abilities common to the Eternals, but he has trained some of them far beyond the norm. While the exact limits are unknown, his immense, superhuman strength makes him the physically strongest of all known Eternals, save for Thanos. His strength has been shown to rival that of Thor, and Hercules.

Like all other Eternals, the Forgotten One is virtually immortal. He has not aged since reaching adulthood and he is immune to all known diseases; his body is also highly durable and resistant to physical injury. He is capable of withstanding high-caliber bullets, falls from great heights, powerful concussive forces, and temperature extremes, all without being injured. However, it is possible to injure him by disrupting the mental discipline that he maintains over his body. This ability allows him to control every molecule in his body, which in turn allows him to regenerate any damaged or destroyed tissue. Should his mental discipline be broken, however, it is possible to permanently injure or kill him.

Other abilities that he shares with most other Eternals include the power to fly at great speed, project beams of concussive force or heat from his eyes and hands, and the power to manipulate matter. The degree to which these powers have been developed in comparison with other Eternals is unknown, but the first two have been stated as presumed to be average. He also possesses highly developed senses that helped to compensate for his former blindness, enabling him to be an excellent hunter and tracker.

The Forgotten One is one of the most accomplished hand-to-hand combatants among the Eternals. He possesses an extraordinary melee capacity, with knowledge of most methods of hand-to-hand combat known in ancient Earth civilizations. He usually arms himself with simple hand weapons and sometimes wears battle armor.

== Reception ==
Newsarama ranked the character, as Gilgamesh, as the second worst Avengers member, commenting: "What's that you say? You aren't familiar with Gilgamesh, the ancient Sumerian hero? And why is this guy wearing a cow on his head? Let's just say there's a reason this guy is called "The Forgotten One". Maybe next time you can get Mithras, or at least Marduk".

However, the character is often highly ranked for power:

- In 2021, Comic Book Resources (CBR) ranked Gilgamesh 9th in their "15 Most Powerful Eternals" list.
- In 2021, Screen Rant ranked the Forgotten One 3rd in their "10 Most Powerful Members Of The Eternals" list
- In 2021, CBR ranked Gilgamesh 8th in their "10 Strongest Characters From Eternals Comics" list.

== In other media ==
=== Film ===
Gilgamesh appears in Eternals (2021), portrayed by Don Lee. This version has a close relationship with Thena and keeps an eye on her when she develops Mahd Wy'ry. During the events of the film, Gilgamesh participates in getting the Eternals back together to combat the Deviants until he is killed by Kro.

=== Video games ===
- Gilgamesh appears as an unlockable playable character in Marvel Future Fight.
- Gilgamesh appears as an assist character in Marvel Future Revolution.
- Gilgamesh appears in Marvel Snap.
