= Arishem the Judge =

Marvel Comics fictional character

- Arishem on the left, with fellow Celestials Hargen the Measurer and Eson the Searcher. Art by Giorgio Comolo.

Publication information
- Publisher: Marvel Comics
- First appearance: The Eternals #2 (August 1976)
- Created by: Jack Kirby

In-story information
- Species: Celestial
- Team affiliations: Celestials
- Abilities: Nigh-invulnerability; Nigh-omnipotence; Nigh-immortality

Arishem the Judge is a fictional character appearing in American comic books published by Marvel Comics. Created by Jack Kirby, the character first appeared in The Eternals #2 (August 1976). Arishem is one of two Celestials who have the right and ability to judge which civilizations will live and which will die. Arishem's function is to act as the leader of Celestial landing parties. He has led all Four Celestial Hosts on Earth.

Arishem debuted in the Marvel Cinematic Universe film Eternals (2021), voiced by David Kaye.

== Publication history ==
Arishem the Judge first appeared in The Eternals #2 (August 1976), and was created by Jack Kirby.

== Fictional character biography ==
Arishem is one of the original Celestials created by the First Firmament, the personification of the first-ever universe. They warred against the Aspirants and destroyed the First Firmament, splintering the First Cosmos into the Second Cosmos, which was the first multiverse. This also resulted in starting a cycle of cosmic death and rebirth. Now that the multiverse of infinite possibilities was a concept in which every what if could become its own what is, the Celestials created the Beyonders to manage and maintain this new creation. When the Second Cosmos ended, the Celestials passed on to the next Third Cosmos and every cosmos after that.

Arishem first arrived on Earth-616 alongside other Celestials after the destruction of the sixth iteration of the cosmos to create a new one. Across their mission, Arishem and the Celestials encountered Knull, ruler of the Void left by the destruction of the sixth iteration of the cosmos. The Celestials wanted Knull to serve them and made him the King in Black, a role of maintenance like the Beyonders, but Knull took the role and rejected its purpose. Arishem and the other Celestials banished Knull into the Void, but he came back to war with them.

Arishem arrived on Earth with the Fourth Celestial Host, beginning his 50-year judgment of Earth. During the Third Host, Arishem accepted the Earth Gods' vow of non-interference in Celestial affairs. With the other members of the Fourth Host, Arishem judged Earth worthy and left.

When the Second Host visited Earth, Arishem was responsible for the culling of the Deviants, causing the Great Cataclysm, also known as the Great Flood, that flooded the world. Arishem arrived to judge a distant planet on which X-Factor had been lost for some time. Arishem was attacked by the combined power of the Chosen, Rejects, and Beginagins factions; in response to this attack, he allowed the planet to live and the Celestials departed.

When the Dark Celestials invade Earth to purge the planet, they attack and kill the Celestials, including Arishem, by infecting them with the Horde. During the Avengers' final stand against the Dark Celestials, the Horde reanimates the bodies of the fallen Celestials. To defeat the Horde, the Avengers merge their energies to form a Uni-Mind, rendering the Horde dormant. The Celestials are resurrected and assist the Avengers in taking down the Dark Celestials.

== Powers and abilities ==
Like all of the other Celestials, Arishem is an extremely powerful cosmic being whose powers are rivaled by other cosmic entities. Arishem and fellow Celestials are immense beings with limitless strength and supernatural powers that transcend time and space, being able to manipulate cosmic energies, create new species, and eradicate life. Like the other Celestials, Arishem is nigh-invulnerable and nigh-immortal, able to regenerate lost limbs instantly. If Celestials are killed, they can be resurrected by other Celestials, but only if they have not been dead for too long. Celestials exist across the multiverse at once, so there is only one Arishem in the multiverse, but he is split among aspects in every universe.

== Reception ==
=== Critical reception ===
Saim Cheeda of CBR.com ranked Arishem 9th in their "Marvel's 20 Most Powerful Celestials" list.

== In other media ==
- Arishem appears in the Marvel Cinematic Universe film Eternals, voiced by David Kaye.
- Arishem appears in Marvel Snap.
