= Makkari (character) =

Fictional character in the Marvel Comics

- Textless variant cover of Eternals vol. 3 #2 (September 2006). Art by John Romita Jr.

Publication information
- Publisher: Marvel Comics
- First appearance: As Mercury: Red Raven Comics #1 (August 1940); As Hurricane: Captain America Comics #1 (March 1941); As Makkari: The Eternals #5 (November 1976)
- Created by: Martin Bursten; Jack Kirby

In-story information
- Alter ego: Makkari
- Species: Eternal
- Team affiliations: Eternals; First Line; Monster Hunters
- Notable aliases: Mike Khary; Frank Harper; Mark Curry; Jake Curtiss; Major Mercury; Hurricane; Mercury; Adam Clayton; Mac Curry; Michael Gray; Thoth
- Abilities: Superhuman strength, speed, durability, and stamina; Cosmic energy manipulation; Matter transmutation; Illusion generation; Teleportation; Immortality; Flight

Makkari, formerly known as Hurricane and Mercury, is a fictional character appearing in American comic books published by Marvel Comics. Created by Jack Kirby, the character first appeared as Makkari in The Eternals #5 (November 1976), but through retroactive continuity was later established as also having been Mercury in Red Raven Comics #1 (August 1940), created by Kirby and Martin Bursten.

Makkari is a member of the Eternals, a race of superhumans in the Marvel Universe. He was also a member of the First Line and Monster Hunters. Lauren Ridloff portrays a deaf female version of Makkari in the Marvel Cinematic Universe, debuting in Eternals (2021). Elements of this version of Makkari were incorporated into the comics beginning in the 2021 comic series Eternals, which preceded the release of the film. In this series, Makkari is resurrected as a woman following his death in the series Avengers and is later rendered deaf after a failed attempt to contact Tiamut.

== Publication history ==
Originally, Makkari was a character in Jack Kirby's The Eternals. Mark Gruenwald later reintroduced Makkari as a long-running supporting character in the Quasar series.

Hurricane reappears as a member of the Monster Hunters in Marvel Universe #4 (September 1998), in a story set in the 1950s. By the end of this three-issue story, it turns out the monsters they are hunting are actually Deviants and Hurricane is revealed to be Makkari. Marvel Comics continuity was later retconned so that the character presented as the mythological god Mercury, introduced in Red Raven Comics #1 ("Mercury in the 20th Century" by artist Kirby and writer Martin A. Bursten; August 1940), was actually Makkari. Mercury was only seen in that single story, in which he worked to thwart the machinations of Pluto.

Makkari is featured as one of the main characters in the Marvel limited series Eternals (2006–07), written by Neil Gaiman and penciled by artist John Romita Jr.

== Fictional character biography ==
Makkari is the son of Verona and Mara, born in Olympia, the capital city of the Eternals of Earth. He is a member of the Eternals' Technologist's Guild and is skilled at designing and building high-speed vehicles. Makkari has involved himself in Earth's affairs more often than most Eternals. Under the name Thoth, he taught writing to the Egyptians. He was taught philosophy by Plato. He spent some time as the charioteer of Darius I of Persia. He witnessed the Trojan War, the reign of Vlad the Impaler, and the Battle of the Alamo.

In the 1940s, Makkari worked on Earth, per Zuras' request, under the aliases Hurricane and Mercury. He fought Warlord Kro and Deviant mutates alongside the Monster Hunters, a team he formed under the identity Jake Curtiss. Following the disbanding of the Monster Hunters, Makkari was convinced by Pixie to join the First Line as Major Mercury. (Note: Between Marvel: The Lost Generation #4 and Marvel: The Lost Generation #5)

Makkari trades much of his abilities to gain greater speed and endurance. He enlists Quasar to travel to Lemuria to help him save Master Elo, who was tutoring Makkari on how to channel his cosmic energy into more speed. Makkari participates in a marathon to the Moon and nearly wins, but loses at the last moment to an amnesiac, dimension-spanning being. Makkari then becomes Quasar's roommate.

In the 2006 Eternals limited series, the Eternals are the victims of memory and reality manipulation by Sprite, and have thus forgotten their true identities. Makkari gradually recovers his powers and stops terrorists from attacking a party. The Celestial Tiamut begins communicating with Makkari in his dreams, assuming the form of Sersi. By the end of the series, Makkari becomes Tiamut's prophet.

When the Celestials' Final Host arrives on Earth, Makkari and the Eternals kill themselves after realizing the true purpose for which they were created.

In the 2021 Eternals series, Makkari was resurrected as a woman of color. Following a failed attempt to reach the spirit of Tiamut, Makkari is rendered deaf and mute and loses her telepathic powers.

== Powers and abilities ==
Makkari is a member of the race of superhumans known as Eternals. He possesses superhuman strength, speed, and reflexes. He can create cyclones by running in circles, and can run up walls and across water. Makkari's body eventually accumulates fatigue poisons and is susceptible to injury.

Although in most of his appearances Makkari has the typical powers of an Eternal, his obsession with speed, starting in the Quasar series, causes him to focus most of his energy on enhancing his running speed. As a result, he lost his ability to fly and many of his other powers were weakened in the process. Makkari possesses none of the psionic powers of the average Eternal (levitation, ocular force projection, and molecular rearrangement), having purposefully readapted all his specialized cell enclaves to speed and running-related attributes. At present, he can run at near light speed for extended periods, but his physical strength (while still far greater than human) has been reduced by half, and he seemingly cannot project energy or manipulate matter.

Makkari sometimes wears a protective crash helmet, though he does not truly need it. He wears synthetic stretch fabric, specially treated to resist the rigors of high velocity movement.

Makkari has great mechanical aptitude, and the ability to pilot most land and air vehicles. He has moderate experience at hand-to-hand combat; his fighting style incorporates his superhuman speed. He has finished the standard Eternal higher education, and underwent special tutoring in the applications of speed.

== Reception ==
Various online articles have assessed Makkari as among the most powerful Eternals, and among the fastest Marvel characters.

== In other media ==
- Makkari appears in the Eternals motion comic, voiced by Sebastian Spence.
- Makkari appears in Eternals (2021), portrayed by Lauren Ridloff. This version of the character is a woman of color as well as deaf. Makkari is shown to have lived on her ship, the Domo, for years and it is implied that she is in a relationship with Druig. Makkari rejoins the Eternals to stop Tiamut and prevent the destruction of Earth.
- Makkari appears as an unlockable playable character in Marvel Future Fight.
- Makkari appears in Marvel Snap.
