= Tiamut =

Tiamut The Dreaming Celestial

Publication information
- Publisher: Marvel Comics
- First appearance: Eternals #18 (December 1977)
- Created by: Jack Kirby

In-story information
- Alter ego: Tiamut
- Species: Celestial
- Notable aliases: The Communicator; Great Renegade; Golden Celestial; Black Celestial
- Abilities: Nigh-invulnerability; Nigh-omnipotence; Nigh-immortality

Tiamut is a character appearing in American comic books published by Marvel Comics. Created by artist Jack Kirby, the character first appeared in Eternals #18 (December 1977). He is a renegade member of the race of god-like Celestials. He rebelled against Arishem the Judge after believing that his fellow Celestial had violated protocol. In response, the other Celestials of the Fourth Host subdued him, leading to his exile deep within the Earth. In modern times, the Dreaming Celestial awakened and selected the Eternal Makkari as his prophet. The character is also known as Tiamut the Communicator and the Dreaming Celestial.

== Publication history ==
The Dreaming Celestial debuted in Eternals #18 (December 1977), and was created by artist Jack Kirby. He later appeared in Eternals vol. 2 #9 (June 1986), #11-12 (August–September 1986), Silver Surfer Annual #2 (1989), Fantastic Four #340 (May 1990), Fantastic Four #25 (January 2000), Heroes Reborn: Ashema #1 (January 2000), Heroes Reborn: Doom #1 (January 2000), The Eternals (2006—2007), Uncanny X-Men #496 (May 2008), and The Incredible Hercules #116 (June 2008).

The Dreaming Celestial received an entry in the Official Handbook of the Marvel Universe Update '89 #2.

== Fictional character biography ==
The Dreaming Celestial is a renegade Celestial named Tiamut. He claims that during the Second Host to visit Earth, he resisted the Host's decision to not turn Earth over to the Horde and was exiled and his spirit trapped in the "Vial". Tiamut is sealed under the Diablo Range in California until he is discovered by Ghaur, who temporarily releases his power. He is reawakened by the Deviants and acts as a beacon for the Horde as he proceeds to "judge" Earth. This leads to his confrontation with Fulcrum and his ascending from the state of being a Celestial.

After the events of "Heroes Reborn", the Dreaming Celestial finds a loophole out of his prison: a gateway into the Heroes Reborn universe. The Dreaming Celestial learns that one of his star-spawned kin is the guardian of the pocket universe. He concludes that the only way out of the pocket universe is through her, the Celestial Ashema. The Dreaming Celestial plots Ashema's demise, but is opposed by Doctor Doom, Lancer, Technarx, and several other heroes. The Dreaming Celestial captures Ashema and escapes to Earth-616, where he is thwarted by Doom and the Fantastic Four.

The Deviants eventually re-awake the Dreaming Celestial, who turns from black to gold when the sun's rays hit him. For reasons as yet unrevealed, the Dreaming Celestial decides against destroying Earth as he had originally intended. The Dreaming Celestial decides to wait and judge humanity for himself by his unknown standards. In the interim, he informs Makkari that a devastating force called the Horde, drawn to the planet by the Celestial's awakening, is heading for Earth. Makkari becomes the Dreaming Celestial's prophet; in this capacity, Makkari is an object of veneration to the Deviants, who call him the Skadraach ("avatar"). The Dreaming Celestial later confronts the Fulcrum, who asks him to become his companion.

== Powers and abilities ==
Tiamut wields incalculable energy, capable of reshaping reality, traversing galaxies and dimensions instantly, and communicating telepathically across vast distances. As a Celestial, his power is so immense that he can destroy entire planets with ease. Tiamut seems to be one of the most powerful as Galactus feared it and Uatu could not see anything when it awoke.

== In other media ==
- Tiamut appears in media set in the Marvel Cinematic Universe (MCU).
  - In Eternals (2021), the Eternals learn that he resides in the Earth's core, but are tasked with aiding in his birth, but when they learn that this event is intended to destroy the Earth, they split into two factions, with one faction supporting the Celestial's emergence, and the other attempting to prevent it, in opposition to the Celestials. Tiamut partially emerges from the Indian Ocean, but the Eternals petrify him via the Uni-Mind.
  - In Captain America: Brave New World (2025), Tiamut's corpse is revealed to contain adamantium, which different countries wish to harvest, bringing them into conflict with one another.
  - Two alternate universe versions of Tiamut appear in the third season of What If...? (2024).
- Tiamut appears in the Eternals motion comic, voiced by Alex Zahara.
