= Eternals (comics) =

Group of comic book characters

- Cover of Eternals (vol. 4) #1 (August 2008) by Daniel Acuña

Species publication information
- Publisher: Marvel Comics
- First appearance: The Eternals #1 (July 1976)
- Created by: Jack Kirby

Characteristics
- Notable members: List of Eternals

The Eternals or Eternals
- : Cover of The Eternals vol. 1, 1 (Jul 1976), art by Jack Kirby

Series publication information
- Publisher: Marvel Comics
- Schedule: Monthly
- Format: (vol. 1, 4 & 5); Ongoing series (vol. 2 & 3); Limited series
- Genre: Superhero
- Publication date: (vol. 1); July 1976 – January 1978 (vol. 2); October 1985 – September 1986 (vol. 3); August 2006 – March 2007 (vol. 4); August 2008 – March 2009 (vol. 5); January 2021 – May 2022
- Number of issues: (vol. 1); 19, 1 Annual (vol. 2); 12 (vol. 3); 7 (vol. 4); 9, 1 Annual (vol. 5); 12

Creative team
- Writer(s): Jack Kirby (vol. 1); Kieron Gillen (vol. 5)
- Artist(s): Esad Ribíc (vol. 5)
- Penciller(s): Jack Kirby (vol. 1)

Collected editions
- Jack Kirby's Eternals Omnibus: ISBN 0-7851-2205-2
- Neil Gaiman's Eternals (hardcover): ISBN 0-7851-2541-8
- To Slay a God: ISBN 0-7851-2978-2

The Eternals are a race of humanoids appearing in American comic books published by Marvel Comics. They were created by Jack Kirby, making their first appearance in The Eternals #1 (July 1976).

In the Marvel Universe, the Eternals are an offshoot of humanity known as Homo immortalis which were created one million years ago by the enigmatic alien Celestials to defend Earth with their superhuman powers and abilities. Their primary adversaries are the Deviants, who share a similar origin and pose a regular threat to humanity. Due to their virtual immortality, Eternals have largely secluded themselves from humans, with their god-like status forming the basis of various mythological figures around the world.

Since their appearance, the Eternals have had several of their own series, in addition to crossing into other titles, such as Thor and X-Men. They made their live action film debut in the Marvel Cinematic Universe with their own feature film Eternals, directed by Chloé Zhao, which was released November 5, 2021.

== Publication history ==
In 1970, Jack Kirby left Marvel Comics to work at DC Comics, where he began the saga of the New Gods, an epic story involving mythological and science fiction concepts. Though he had planned for a definitive ending, the series was abruptly cancelled. Upon his return to Marvel, Kirby continued exploring his interest in mythological science fiction through The Eternals.

Originally titled "The Celestials", Marvel changed the title to "Return of the Gods", whose comic book cover bore stylistics similarities to Erich von Daniken's book Chariots of the Gods?. To avoid potential legal issues, the name was again changed to “Eternals". The Eternals' saga was thematically similar to the New Gods' and it shared the same fate: Kirby's new series also was eventually canceled without resolving many of its plots. Writers Roy Thomas and Mark Gruenwald used the Eternals in a Thor storyline that concluded in Thor #301, resolving those lingering plotlines. Subsequent to the Thor storyline, the Eternals (and the mythology connected to them) have appeared or been mentioned in numerous Marvel comics. In particular, the Celestials' experiment on humanity has been used to explain how certain humans can develop super-powers. The Titanians (created by Jim Starlin) and Uranians (created by Stan Lee) were later retconned as being Eternals as well.

The Eternals returned for a 12-issue miniseries in 1985 under writer Peter B. Gillis and penciler Sal Buscema. According to comic-book historian Peter Sanderson, "editor in chief Jim Shooter disliked Gillis's scripts, so Walter Simonson wrote the final four issues."

In 2000, a one-shot comic called New Eternals: Apocalypse Now #1 featured an older conflict between the Eternals and Apocalypse. In 2003, writer Chuck Austen and artist Kev Walker rebooted the franchise for Marvel's mature readers-focused MAX imprint, resulting in The Eternal.

The Eternal series from Marvel's MAX imprint written by Chuck Austen was based on an idea he had been working on for a while: "I pitched this back when I first started working at Marvel, but Joe Quesada was against doing it. He saw no future in this particular old Kirby concept." Austen described the plot as involving "Ikaeden, the leader of the Eternals, who arrives on Earth at the dawn of man, and evolves humankind from Homo erectus so he can use them as slaves to mine raw materials for the Celestials, his bosses, basically," as well as "Kurassus, who is the second-in-command of the mining mission, and who is determined to undermine Ikaeden and kill Ikaeden's precious slave-girl and son." In an interview with Newsarama he gave an outline of his planned plot:

In this version, we take some of the concepts from [the original series] and build around them, throwing away some stuff and keeping others. We're actually going back in time to see Ikaris birth and development on Earth, meet his parents, and then move forward into contemporary time. When we get to contemporary time, the Celestials return to judge Earth, but there's no fifty-year 'study and evaluation period.' We've already been judged and found wanting, too violent to be allowed to flourish and spread, and Ikaris and the others have to stop the Celestials, who consider us their property, from destroying the entire planet as they have done to many others, including another in the Solar System.

Planned as an ongoing series, it was cancelled after six issues.

Neil Gaiman, with artist John Romita, Jr., created a 2006 miniseries, which helped bring the Eternals' role in the modern Marvel Universe up-to-date. Solicited as a six-issue series, an extra issue was added to the run, because, according to editor Nick Lowe, "There was too much story to fit into the structure we set for ourselves. Neil was starting issue five and told me that he might need a seventh issue. He just had too much story to fit in six issues (even with the first and sixth double-sized)."

A fourth Eternals series ran as an ongoing series for nine issues and one annual from August 2008 – March 2009.

The Eternals returned in Jason Aaron's Avengers, a story arc involving the Dark Celestials, which saw the Eternals all killed in the fourth issue. However, the characters were resurrected in their new ongoing series launched in January 2021 by writer Kieron Gillen and artist Esad Ribić.

== Fictional history ==
When the Celestials visited Earth 1,000,000 years ago and performed genetic experiments on early proto-humans, they created two divergent races: the long-lived Eternals, and the monstrous Deviants. These experiments also led to the capacity for mutations in humans.

A civil war broke out amongst the Eternals over whether to conquer the other races, with one faction led by Kronos and the other by his brother, Uranos. Kronos's side prevailed; Uranos and his defeated faction left Earth and journeyed to Uranus, where they built a colony. Some of Uranos's group tried to return to Earth to re-kindle the war, but were attacked by a passing Kree ship and forced to land on Saturn's moon Titan, where they established a colony.

Kronos's experiments in cosmic energy caused a catastrophic release of energy throughout the Eternals' city, Titanos, destroying it, activating latent genes in the Eternals, and disintegrating Kronos's body. The Eternals gained the ability to channel cosmic energy, granting them near-godlike power. Kronos's son Zuras was chosen to succeed Kronos as Prime Eternal, while his other son A'lars chose to leave Earth to avoid causing another civil war and left for Titan.

While Zuras ruled, three new Eternal cities were built. The first was Olympia, located in the mountains of Greece, near the main portal between the Earth dimension and the Olympians' home dimension, which led many ancient Greeks to confuse some of the godlike Eternals with members of the Olympian pantheon. Eventually, an agreement was reached with the gods where some Eternals, such as Thena, would impersonate the Olympians before their worshipers. The other two Eternal cities were Polaria (located in Siberia) and Oceana (in the Pacific).

After World War II, some Eternals allied with humans and Deviants to form the Damocles Foundation, which tried to create a new breed of superhuman to rule Earth. Some Eternals, such as Makkari, were also active as superheroes, or living amongst humans, keeping their true nature hidden. The Eternals also helped to move the Inhumans' city to the Himalayas to keep it hidden.

=== Modern Age ===
Ikaris accompanies Daniel Damian and his daughter Margo into an Eternal city in the Andes, where he awakens Ajak. Ajak begins the process to receive the Celestials. These movements alert the Deviants, who decide to attack New York. When the Celestials return to judge the worthiness of their creations, the Eternals find themselves clashing with the Deviants again, and decided to publicly reveal their existence to humanity. However, Zuras is killed in the battle against the Celestials.

Some time later, the Deviants attack Olympia, kidnapping the Eternals and intending to disintegrate them. The hero Iron Man (James Rhodes) rescued the Eternals and helped them defeat the Deviants. Most of the Eternals (led by Valkin) leave for the stars, while some – those most heavily involved in Earthly affairs – remain on Earth.

With the ascension of Priestlord Ghaur as leader of the Deviants, the Eternals join the Avengers in defeating him after he absorbs the power of a Celestial and tries to gain godhood. Meanwhile, Ikaris questions Thena for her poor choices as leader of the Eternals. After a special ceremony, Ikaris succeeds her as leader of the Earth's Eternals.

Cover of New Eternals: Apocalypse Now #1 (February 2000) by Joe Bennett

=== Memory loss and the Dreaming Celestial ===
The Eternals began reappearing on Earth in Neil Gaiman's new take on the immortal beings. Most seemed to have no memory of their own history and abilities, except Ikaris, and few records of their previous appearances remain. Sprite, angered at having to remain an eleven-year-old and unable to grow any further, managed to change reality, inducing collective amnesia in the Eternals as well as distorting their perceptions of history. He uses a Uni-Mind with the Dreaming Celestial and other unwilling Eternals to achieve his desire, transforming himself into a child.

Makkari, Sersi, Thena, and Druig meet at a party in Vorozheika, with their reunion inadvertently causing them to regain their powers. Two of the Deviants manage to kidnap Sprite and Makkari, using him to awaken the Dreaming Celestial, who resides underground in San Francisco. Upon awakening, the Celestial decides to judge humanity. The Eternals, now remembering their past, arrive in San Francisco, and realizing that they cannot stop the Celestial, decide to leave him be. Makkari becomes the Celestial's herald.

=== Resurrection and confrontation with Thanos ===
Variant cover of The Eternals (vol. 5) #2 (February 2021) by Jamie McKelvie

After the events of The Final Host, the Eternals are revived by the Machine with no memories of their recent events. As Ikaris retrieves Sprite, Zuras is mysteriously murdered, forcing Ikaris and Sprite to retrieve others after encountering Thanos. Phastos is the first Eternal reborn and learns the shocking truth about the Machine: every time an Eternal is resurrected, one human life is taken in return. Shocked by this revelation, Phastos vows to end it by ending the Eternals. However, Thanos kills Phastos to hide the truth and works with Druig to depose Zuras. The Eternals learn the truth after Ikaris sacrifices himself to repair the machine.

Thanos is elected as the new Prime Eternal and disposes of Zuras. The group infiltrates the Avengers' base to confront the Celestial Progenitor and learn why the Celestials created the Eternals. While the Eternals stall the Avengers, Ajak gains access to the Progenitor's consciousness and uncovers the truth of their origin. She learns that when the Progenitor died from sickness, the necrofluid began to contaminate life on Earth, which resulted in excess deviation and mutation. The Celstials began designing the Deviants to stabilize the necrofluid, while the Eternals served as antibodies to eliminate the Deviants if the mutations were unstable. After Thanos' defeat, Druig becomes Prime Eternal and begins to suspect the mutants' settlement on Krakoa as Deviants, wishing to eliminate them.

=== A.X.E.: Judgment Day ===
Believing that mutants represent another form of deviation, Druig orders the Eternals to attack Krakoa, starting a conflict with the X-Men. The Avengers became involved as the conflict escalated, while Ajak, Makkari and Phastos seek a way to stop the war.

The conflict changes when the Celestial Progenitor awakens and begins judging humanity to determine whether they are worthy of continued existence. Ajak questions the Progenitor's authority and attempted to understand the purpose behind his judgement. Simultaneously, Uranos escapes prison and attacks Olympia.

The Progenitor turns against humanity and begins destroying Earth. Ajak pointed out that the Celestial has failed his own test by going on the path of destruction rather than giving humanity another chance to change. Jean Gray and Iron Man ask Progenitor to change his decision. The Progenitor ultimately restores the lives of humans and shuts itself down, asking Ajak to replace him as a better god.

== Powers and abilities ==
Due to the cosmic energy that suffuses an Eternal's body and the unbreakable mental hold they have over their physiological processes, the Eternals of Earth are effectively immortal. They live for millennia, do not fatigue from physical exertion, are immune to disease and poison, and are unaffected by environmental extremes of cold and heat. Most cannot be injured by conventional weaponry, and even if they somehow are, an Eternal can rapidly regenerate any damage as long as they are able to retain their mental hold over their bodies; this mental bond can be broken. In the 2006 series it was also stated that Eternals are able to absorb oxygen directly from water, and therefore cannot drown. In the same series, Ikaris was plunged into molten metal and experienced great pain, but no physical injury, which the Deviants attributed to a forcefield which protects Ikaris even when unconscious. It is unclear if all Eternals share this degree of protection.

At one time, the official limit to the Eternals' durability was such that they could only be permanently destroyed by dispersing their bodies' molecules over a wide area. This degree of extreme durability was revealed to have increased to a much greater degree; as demonstrated in the 2006 Eternals limited series, it is shown that even total molecular dispersal is insufficient to destroy an Eternal. As long as "The Machine" (a restoration device of Celestial origin; possibly the Earth itself) keeps running, any destroyed Eternal will eventually return, as was the case with Ikaris after he was completely vaporized by a particle accelerator as part of a series of "experiments" performed upon him by the Deviants.

This same cosmic energy can be channeled for a number of superhuman abilities, including superhuman physical abilities, immortality, flight, energy projection, mind control, teleportation, illusion creation, and elemental transmutation. In addition, groups of Eternals, as few as three at a time, can transform into the Uni-Mind, a combination of minds that is greater than its constituent parts.

Some Eternals choose to focus on a particular power to increase their effectiveness with it. Sersi, for example, has developed the power of transmutation further than any other Eternal. Additionally, some Eternals choose to focus their cosmic energies into other, non-standard abilities. Ikaris, for example, channels cosmic energy to greatly enhance his senses, while the Interloper uses his to generate fear in others, and Makkari uses his cosmic energies for superspeed.

=== Limitations ===
The 2006 retcon of the Eternals' origins and abilities introduces a significant limitation to their powers, and possibly to their free will, with numerous references to Eternals being "programmed" or "hardwired." They cannot attack their Celestial "masters" for any reason, whether they make a conscious decision to do so or are tricked into accidentally striking the beings. Any such attempt shuts down the body of the attacking Eternal and is implied to be an automatic defense mechanism of the Celestials' armor. On one occasion, when the Eternals attempted to form a Uni-Mind with the intent of keeping the Dreaming Celestial asleep, they were shut down and reverted to their original forms. Furthermore, Eternals are compelled to attack and neutralize any being that attacks a Celestial.

As presented in Gaiman's Volume 3, the Eternals are aware of their role on Earth and the duties and constraints placed on them by the Celestials. Ikaris describes himself as the Earth's repair and maintenance unit. Zuras phrased the same concept more philosophically: "We are the Eternals. We are the court of last resort for humanity and for all living things on Earth. [...] We do not choose sides. Countries are lines in the sand, empires rise and fall. We are timeless. We will still be here tomorrow, and a hundred centuries from now."

== Members ==
=== Generations ===
The Eternals are split between five different generationals groups:

- First Generation Eternal (those born before the fall of Titanos): Arlok, Astron, Daina, Kronos/Chronos/Chronus, Master Elo, Oceanus, Shastra, Thyrio, Uranos.
- Second Generation Eternal (those alive at the time of Chronus's experiment): Mentor (A'lars), Amaa, Cybele, Forgotten One/Gilgamesh, Helios, Perse, Rakar, Tulayn, Valkin, Virako, Zuras.
- Third Generation Eternal (those born after Chronos's experiment but before the Second Host): Aginar, Ajak, Arex, Atlo, Domo, Ikaris, Interloper, Mara, Phastos, Sigmar, Thanos, Thena, Veron, Zarin, Eros
- Fourth Generation Eternal (those born after the coming of the Second Host, 20,000 years ago): Argos, Ceyote, Chi Demon, the Delphan brothers, Druig, Khoryphos, Makkari, Psykos, Sersi, Kingo Sunen, El Vampiro.
- Fifth Generation Eternal (those born after the coming of the Third Host, 3,000 years ago): Aurelle, Sprite, Titanis.

== Antecedents ==
- Arthur C. Clarke's book Childhood's End from 1953 provided inspiration, including the idea of "Overlords" who control Earth's fate and will reveal themselves further after a 50-year waiting period, the idea of demons being humanity's memory of another species, and the "Overmind" concept which seems to influence the comic's "Uni-Mind".
- Mercury and Hurricane, two characters depicted by Jack Kirby through Timely Comics, the 1940s predecessor of Marvel, were retconned as being guises of the Eternal Makkari.

== Reception ==
Jeremy Brown of Game Rant ranked the Eternals 6th in their "Marvel: Best Superhero Teams" list. Marc Buxton of Den of Geek ranked the Eternals 7th in their "Guardians of the Galaxy 3: 50 Marvel Characters We Want to See" list.

== Literary reception ==
=== Volumes ===
The Eternals comic book series won Best Lettering and was nominated for Best Archival Collection/Project—Comic Books at the 2007 Eisner Awards.

==== Eternals (1976) ====
Marc Buxton of Den of Geek stated, "Jack Kirby delivered the original electrifying Eternals saga. Other than a Hulk robot (because reasons), there was no mention of the Marvel Universe anywhere in this series. But this was Kirby at his 1970s finest, getting all metaphysical and theological as he combined his imaginative saga with real world legend. Sersi does also turn a man's face into Ben Grimm's The Thing face in her introduction."

==== Eternals (2006) ====
According to Diamond Comic Distributors, Eternals #1 was the 17th best selling comic book in June 2006. Eternals #2 was the 28th best selling comic book in July 2006. Eternals #3 was the 28th best selling comic book in August 2006.

Jared Gaudreau of Comic Book Resources asserted, "The seven-issue mini-series covered previous themes like creation and did an excellent job expanding Eternals lore and adding numerous new side characters. One of those great additions came in the form of a love interest for Thena named Thomas Eliot." Marc Buxton of Den of Geek wrote, "This is a must read for any fan of American Gods as Gaiman and Romita examine recurring themes of mythology made real and they channel it all through a magnificent Kirby lens. Do not be surprised if the coming film borrows liberally from this fantastic series." Colin Cheney of Fatherly said, "The series is a good, grounded way to enter the Eternals-verse: Romita's art is appropriately bombastic, and we get some good bang-pow comics action—but it's also pretty talky (because it's Neil Gaiman). But also because it's Neil Gaiman we get a nice right hook to the jaw of the problematic inspiration behind Kirby's original comic."

==== Eternals (2008) ====
According to Diamond Comic Distributors, Eternals #1 was the 52nd best selling comic book in June 2008.

K. Thor Jensen of PCMag called the Eternals comic book series the "last high-profile attempt to reboot the concept," stating, "This was the bridge that brought the group into the modern era, and it's a very solid read." Eric Diaz of Nerdist included the comic book series in their "Essential Eternals Comics" list, writing, "Daniel Acuna provided memorable pencil art. In this short-lived comic, the Eternals are more intimately tied to the X-Men, with stories that crossed over with the mutant's time in San Francisco. When the Dreaming Celestial awakens and towers over the mutant home city, it forces the Eternals to take action. Not one of the most well-known runs, and it only lasted eight issues and one Annual. But it is worth a read for sure."

==== Eternals (2021) ====
According to data combined from all direct market distributors, Eternals #1 was the 4th best selling comic book in January 2021.

Matthew Sibley of Newsarama asserted, "Eternals #1 is not just a fresh start for the creative team and for potential readers, but also for the Eternals themselves to define who they are." Barry Thompson of Polygon said, "In terms of execution, Eternals #1 is extremely good. Gillen introduces and entices the uninitiated without bogging itself down with exposition or patronizing anybody who brings some prior knowledge to the table. As far as fulfilling its primary functions, Eternals #1 checks all the necessary boxes." Colin Cheney of Fatherly asserted, "Esad Ribic's artwork — and the colors by Matthew Wilson — is quite beautiful and cinematic. The storytelling is sharp and clear: Gillen has a witty, wry way of letting his characters reveal themselves and the wider world. We get a good sense of the characters' personalities (particularly Ikaris and Sprite) quite quickly… And hell: you get a little bit of Iron Man." Adam Barnhardt of ComicBook.com gave Eternals #1 a grade of 4 out of 5, saying, "Readers looking for a strong character-driven story serving study on the likes of Ikaris, Sprite, and the remaining Eternals will find Gillen and Ribić's Eternals #1 to be a delightful read. Readers looking for something akin to a blockbuster event may need to keep looking, save for an epic, applause-inducing cliffhanger. It's an intriguing new start for readers new and old, alike and, at the very least, it's evident this creative team is setting out to establish a definitive take for one of Marvel's biggest unproven ideas."

== In other media ==
- The Eternals appear in a self-titled Marvel Cinematic Universe film, released on November 5, 2021. It stars Gemma Chan as Sersi, Richard Madden as Ikaris, Kumail Nanjiani as Kingo, Lia McHugh as Sprite, Brian Tyree Henry as Phastos, Lauren Ridloff as Makkari, Barry Keoghan as Druig, Don Lee as Gilgamesh, Salma Hayek as Ajak, and Angelina Jolie as Thena.
- The Eternals appear in a self-titled motion comic, released on September 16, 2014.

== Eternals titles ==
  - Eternals (vol. 1) #1–19 (written and penciled by Jack Kirby, July 1976 - January 1978)
  - Eternals Annual #1 (written and penciled by Jack Kirby, 1977)
  - Thor Annual #7 (September 1978)
  - Thor (vol. 1 ) #283-301 (May 1979 - September 1980)
  - What If... #23-30 (October 1980 - September 1981)
  - Iron Man Annual #6 (November 1983)
  - Avengers (vol. 1 ) #246-248 (August 1984- October 1984)
  - Eternals (vol. 2) #1–12 (limited series, October 1985 - September 1986)
  - The Avengers (vol. 1) #308-310 (October 1989 - November 1989)
  - Eternals: The Herod Factor (November 1991)
  - Avengers (vol. 1 ) #361, #374-375 (April 1993, May 1994 - June 1994 )
  - Heroes for Hire (vol. 1 ) #4-7 (November 1997 - January 1998)
  - The New Eternals: Apocalypse Now (also known as Eternals: The New Breed) #1 (February 2000)
  - Eternals (vol. 3) #1–7 (written by Neil Gaiman, limited series, Jun. 2006 - February 2007)
  - Eternals (vol. 4) #1–9, Annual #1 (August 2008 - March 2009)
  - Hulk (vol 3.) #49 (May 2012)
  - Thor:The Deviants Saga #2–5 (February 2012 - May 2012)
  - Avengers (vol. 8) #4 (September 2018)
  - Eternals (vol. 5) #1–12 (January 2021 – present) Others include:
  - The Eternal #1–6 (written by Chuck Austen, with pencils by Kev Walker and inks by Simon Coleby, August 2003 - January 2004)

== Collected editions ==
A number of the series featuring the Eternals have been collected into trade paperbacks:

- The Eternals (collects The Eternals (vol. 1) #1-19 and The Eternals Annual #1, 1976–1978, Marvel Omnibus hardback, 392 pages, July 2006, ISBN 0-7851-2205-2) collected as a softcovers:
  - Volume 1 (collects The Eternals (vol. 1) #1-11, softcover, 208 pages, July 2008, ISBN 0-7851-3313-5)
  - Volume 2 (collects The Eternals (vol. 1) #12-19 and The Eternals Annual #1, softcover, 188 pages, October 2008, ISBN 0-7851-3442-5)
- Thor: The Eternals Saga:
  - Volume 1 (collects Thor Annual #7 and Thor #283-291, softcover, 208 pages, October 2006, ISBN 0-7851-2404-7)
  - Volume 2 (collects Thor #292-301, softcover, 216 pages, April 2007, ISBN 0-7851-2405-5)
- Eternals (collects Eternals (vol. 3) #1-7, 2006, softcover, 256 pages, Marvel Comics, July 2008, ISBN 0-7851-2177-3, March 2007, Panini Comics, ISBN 1-905239-57-2, hardcover, 256 pages, May 2007, ISBN 0-7851-2176-5, April 2007, ISBN 0-7851-2541-8)
- Eternals:
  - Volume 1: To Slay A God (collects Eternals (vol. 4) #1-6, softcover, 184 pages, March 2009, ISBN 0-7851-2978-2)
  - Volume 2: Manifest Destiny (collects Eternals (vol. 4) #7-9 and Eternals Annual, softcover, 104 pages, September 2009, ISBN 0-7851-2979-0)
- Eternals:
  - Volume 1: Only Death Is Eternal (collects Eternals (vol. 5) #1-6, softcover, 136 pages, September 2021, ISBN 978-1302925475)
  - Volume 2: Hail Thanos (collects Eternals (vol. 5) #7-12, softcover, 160 pages, July 2022, ISBN 978-1302925482)
  - Eternals: A History Written In Blood (collects Eternals: Thanos Rises, Eternals: Celestia, Eternals: The Heretic and material from What If? #24-28, softcover, 112 pages, February 2023, ISBN 978-1302950804)
