= Celestial (comics) =

Group of fictional characters in Marvel Comics

Celestials
- The Celestial Fourth Host (left to right); Hargen, Tefral, Nezzar, Gammenon, Arishem, Jemiah, Eson, Oneg, and Ziran. Panel from Thor #300 (October 1980). Art by Keith Pollard.

Publication information
- Publisher: Marvel Comics
- First appearance: The Eternals #2 (Aug. 1976)
- Created by: Jack Kirby

Characteristics
- Place of origin: First Firmament
- Inherent abilities: Manipulation of reality; Supreme technology

The Celestials are fictional characters appearing in American comic books published by Marvel Comics. Depicted as cosmic beings, they debuted in the Bronze Age of Comic Books and have reappeared on numerous occasions.

The Celestials appear in the Marvel Cinematic Universe live-action films Guardians of the Galaxy (2014), Eternals (2021), and Thor: Love and Thunder (2022).

== Publication history ==
The Celestials debuted in The Eternals #1 (July 1976) and were created by writer and artist Jack Kirby. They reappeared as regular guest stars in three subsequent limited series sequels: The Eternals vol. 2 #1–12 (Oct. 1985 – Sept. 1986), Eternals vol. 3 #1–7 (Aug. 2006 – Feb. 2007), and Eternals vol. 4 #1–9 (Aug. 2008 – May 2009).

The characters have also been featured in other titles, including the "Celestial Saga" storyline in Thor Annual #7 (1978), Thor #283–300 (May 1979 – Oct. 1980), Thor #387–389 (Jan. – March 1988), Quasar #24 (July 1991), Fantastic Four #400 (May 1995), X-Factor #43–46 (Aug. – Nov. 1989) and #48–50 (Dec. 1989 – Jan. 1990). The first detailed account of the Celestials' origin was finally presented in The Ultimates 2 #6 (2017).

== Fictional history ==
The origin of the Celestials was long unknown, with many species across the mainstream Marvel Universe having only unconfirmed legends about their beginnings—until the "Eternity War" storyline, when major revelations about the Celestials were revealed by the Queen of Nevers, a cosmic entity representing possibility.

The multiverse has been destroyed and reborn multiple times, with the current multiverse being the Seventh and later Eighth Cosmos. The Celestials are older than all incarnations of the multiverse. In the beginning, there was no multiverse: creation was composed of a single and sentient universe, referred to as the First Firmament. The First Firmament was the sole being in creation until it decided to create life to give it companions as well as servants. These servants, cosmic beings of a lesser order of power, were of two kinds: black and multicolored. The black servants dutifully obeyed and worshiped their creator. They even created their own servants and sought to preserve the simple order their creator had made. The First Firmament named these loyal beings Aspirants and was pleased by their goals and desire to maintain the status quo. The multicolored servants, who would become the Celestials, desired a dynamic and continually evolving reality with the long-term goal of producing superior cosmic beings.

The two opposing factions of the First Firmament's children could not peacefully co-exist and the ensuing war nearly destroyed the first universe. At some point during the war, the Aspirants created the Godkiller, a 25,000 foot (7,600 m) tall humanoid robot that dwarfed even the Celestials themselves. During the war, the Godkiller killed billions of Celestials, bringing them to the brink of extinction. At this point, a civil war broke out among the Aspirants that led to the Godkiller being stripped of critical parts for weapons. This division within the Aspirants gave the Celestials a chance to recover and make their last stand. In the final battle against the Aspirants, the Celestials detonated their ultimate weapons, nearly killing the First Firmament. In a desperate act of self-preservation, the core essence of the First Firmament took the surviving Aspirants and fled outside reality. The remaining fragments of the first universe coalesced into a new cosmic being, creating the Second Cosmos and the first multiverse. The Celestials settled in the multiverse, beginning their vast plan to create and nurture transitory while evolving life on the newborn worlds within.

This First Host of Celestials is made after the chosen planet has been judged to possess the needed properties for an effective "seeding". The Celestials then return for follow-up visits or "Hosts", during which they monitor the subject planet's progress and make whatever modifications or interventions they deem appropriate. During the First Host on Earth, the Celestials begin genetic experimentation to determine the future development of humans, creating three subspecies: Eternals, Deviants, and mutants.

=== The Fulcrum ===
The Celestials' actions conflict with the policy of "non-interference" practiced by fellow cosmic entities the Watchers, with the two races becoming enemies. The Celestials and their "opposites", insect-like beings called the Horde, are instruments of an entity referred to as the Fulcrum, their purpose to be "instruments of the planting/creation/teeming of the universe".

=== The End of the Seventh Multiverse ===
In the storyline "Time Runs Out", the Beyonders are revealed to have killed most of the Celestials in a bid to destroy the seventh multiverse. A number of Celestials survive the Beyonders' attack, having taken shelter within the folds of space-time. This rebirth provides an opening for the embittered First Firmament to return, seeking to destroy the multiverse and restore itself to the center of creation. The Firmament imprisons and infiltrates Eternity while taking control over the lesser cosmic entities that protected the cosmic balance in its component universes. Under the Firmament's influence, Master Order and Lord Chaos destroy the Living Tribunal, then merge into a singular entity called Logos, who intends to replace the Tribunal. Logos locates the surviving Celestials and destroys all of them except for the One Above All, who is rescued by the Queen of Nevers.

=== A.X.E.: Judgment Day ===
In the storyline "A.X.E.: Judgment Day", the Avengers and the Eternals who did not side with Druig work to revive the Celestial Progenitor (which became Avengers Mountain) when Druig awakens the Hex to attack Krakoa.

== Known Celestials ==
- Arishem the Judge: A Celestial tasked with judging whether the civilization of a planet will live or die.
- Ashema the Listener: A Celestial tasked, along with Nezarr the Calculator, with retrieving Franklin Richards for evaluation as a new member of the Celestials.
- The Blue Celestial: The first Celestial with a documented birth.
- Callus the Void: One of the Celestials turned into a Dark Celestial.
- Celestial Destructor: A member of the Aspirants, he was sent by the First Firmament to attack Eternity. The Destructor is confronted by the Avengers, X-Men, Ultimates and other countless heroes and banished via the Book of the Vishanti.
- The Celestial Gardener: A Celestial tasked with the maintenance of the Apocalypse entity on Earth.
- The Celestial Madonna: A Celestial who had arrived in 114 A.D. at Zhang Heng's palace. She was "pregnant" at the time and wanted to consume either Earth or the Moon to survive, but Zhang convinced her to instead consume the Sun, which killed her immediately.
- Devron the Experimenter: A young Celestial tasked with watching over Earth alongside Gamiel the Manipulator.
- The Dreaming Celestial: Originally known as Tiamut the Communicator, the Dreaming Celestial is a renegade Celestial who was sealed beneath Mount Diablo.
- Ea the Wise:
- Eson the Searcher: A Celestial tasked with "seeking". Eson provided En Sabah Nur with Celestial technology, allowing him to become the tyrant Apocalypse.
- Exitar the Exterminator: A Celestial tasked with the destruction of life on worlds that fail the Celestials' tests.
- The Fallen a.k.a. Zgreb the Aspirant.
- Gamiel the Manipulator: A young Celestial tasked with watching over Earth alongside Devron the Experimenter.
- Gammenon the Gatherer: A Celestial tasked with collecting samples of all life forms present on a planet during a Celestial Host.
- Godhead: A silent Celestial who was tasked to observe the planet Viscardi. After the inhabitants revealed their desire to become powerful like him, he created The Black Vortex.
- Geun the Executioner: A human scientist turned Celestial.
- Groffon the Regurger: A Celestial who destroys planets. He is killed by Deadpool when trying to destroy Earth.
- Hargen the Measurer: A Celestial tasked with measuring or quantifying the planets the Celestials survey.
- Jemiah the Analyzer: A Celestial tasked with analyzing life-form samples.
- Kahltro the Tinkerer: A Celestial tasked with creating instruments of destruction.
- Marazov the Penitent: A human scientist turned Celestial.
- Nezarr the Calculator: A Celestial who is a mathematician and possesses the ability to project illusions.
- Neena the Luck Dragon: The superhero Domino was briefly transformed into a Celestial by the Creation Constellation to stop Geun.
- The One Above All: The leader of the Celestials and temporarily marked as the last living Celestial.
- Obliteron: One of the Celestials that was turned into a Dark Celestial.
- Oneg the Prober: A Celestial tasked with experimentation and implementation.
- The Progenitor: The first Celestial to visit Earth. This Celestial had been infected, while traveling in deep space, by the Horde which eventually killed him. A new Celestial then began judging whether the civilization of Earth will live or die.
- The Red Celestial: A Celestial tasked with helping to birth the Blue Celestial.
- The Red/Blue Judge: A Celestial tasked with judging whether the civilization of a planet will live or die.
- Scathan the Approver: A Celestial from the alternate universe of Earth-691 who is tasked with approving or disapproving situations.
- Star Child: A "Variant Celestial", the son of the Celestial Madonna. He was born on the sun following the death of his mother and was retrieved by Leonardo da Vinci.
- Tefral the Surveyor: A Celestial tasked with surveying and mapping the geography of planets.
- Valknar the Exhumer: One of the Celestials who was turned into a Dark Celestial.
- Xodus the Forgotten: A Celestial who appeared in the series X-Men '92.
- Ziran the Tester: A Celestial tasked with testing the stability of the genetic material of life forms they alter.

== Biology ==
Referred to as "space gods" by the Eternals and the Deviants, the Celestials are armored humanoids with an average height of 2,000 feet (610 m). They weigh an average of 260 tons, meaning they are far denser than air. They are capable of feats such as reducing the Destroyer to slag, moving planets at will, and creating and containing entire pocket universes. Reed Richards theorized that the Celestials' source of power is hyperspace, the source of all energy in the Marvel Universe. The Celestials are near-vulnerable, though not immune to injury.

New Celestials may be born by consuming the mass of the Black Galaxy, a place made out pure biological and organic matter, or with planets which were implanted with Celestial eggs/embryos at the core and after millions of years they would be born and would consume the planet, similar to the Celestials of Earth X. However, there are other ways for a Celestial to be born as witnessed with the Celestial Madonna who was carrying an infant Celestial. The Celestials also have an immune system, consisting of armored behemoths, jellyfish-like antibodies and a swarm creature with wings and tentacles, which can fire blasts from their eye. The Celestials are all telepathically linked to one-another no matter the distance.

Thanos, wielding the Infinity Gauntlet, ranked the Celestials as being on roughly the same scale of power as Galactus, the Stranger, Odin, and Zeus, but below that of Mistress Love, Lord Chaos, and Master Order.

== Reception ==
Various online articles have assessed the Celestials as among the most powerful characters in Marvel Comics.

== Other versions ==
Although the Celestials appear in other realities, these are all aspects of the same characters because Celestials exist across the multiverse simultaneously.

- In Earth X, the Celestials are energy beings encased in armor made of vibranium, a metal with properties that prevent their dissipation. They reproduce by planting a fragment of their essence in a planet, which matures into a new Celestial over the course of eons.
- In the Ultimate Marvel universe, the Celestials are a race of powerful superhumans led by Shen Xorn.
- In Mutant X, the Celestials were killed in battle with the Goblin Entity, an all-powerful being that consumes galaxies.
- In X-Men '92, the Celestials evolved from mutants.
- What If?: Secret Wars features a version of Doctor Doom with the powers of the Beyonder and the Infinity Gauntlet who had defeated the Celestials.

== In other media ==
=== Television ===
Eson the Searcher appears in the second season of X-Men '97, voiced by Matthew Waterson.

=== Film ===
- The Celestials appear in media set within the Marvel Cinematic Universe.
  - The severed head of a deceased Celestial was converted into Knowhere, a base used by space travelers. Following the events of Avengers: Infinity War, the Collector sold Knowhere to the Guardians of the Galaxy, who turned it into their headquarters.
  - In Guardians of the Galaxy, footage of Eson the Searcher is shown using the Power Stone to destroy a planet.
  - In Guardians of the Galaxy Vol. 2, Ego the Living Planet, Peter Quill / Star-Lord's biological father, is a Celestial who controls a humanoid avatar to travel the universe. His planetary form is a living extension of his Celestial consciousness.
  - In Eternals, Arishem the Judge, Nezarr the Calculator, Jemiah the Analyzer, and Hargen the Measurer appear. These versions stabilized the universe with their infinite powers and to plant seeds of their species in planets, destroying them in the process. To control those planets' population growth, they made the Deviants. When they disobeyed the Celestials' will, the latter created the Eternals. Arishem has a greater rank than other Celestials. In the present day, Tiamut nearly emerges from Earth, but is turned to adamantium by Sersi.
  - A Celestial Gardener and a Mad Celestial appear in Thor: Love and Thunder.

=== Theme parks ===
Eson the Searcher appears in Guardians of the Galaxy: Cosmic Rewind.

=== Video games ===
- Eson the Searcher appears in Lego Marvel Super Heroes 2.
- An unnamed Celestial appears as a boss in Marvel Ultimate Alliance 3: The Black Order's Black Order Expansion Pass.
- Eson the Searcher appears in Marvel Snap.
