= List of Marvel Cinematic Universe films =

American superhero media franchise films

Marvel Cinematic Universe films
- Artwork for "The Infinity Saga Collector's Edition" box set
- Based on: Characters published by Marvel Comics
- Produced by: Kevin Feige (Note: Kevin Feige has produced every MCU film, with some films having additional producers. See the tables in § Films for more information.)
- Starring: See below
- Production companies: Marvel Studios (Note: Marvel Studios is the production company for every MCU film, with some films having additional production companies associated with the other producers on the films.); Columbia Pictures (SM); Pascal Pictures (SM)
- Distributed by: Paramount Pictures (2008–2011); Universal Pictures (TIH; 2008); Walt Disney Studios Motion Pictures (2012–present); Sony Pictures (SM; 2017–present)
- Release date: 2008–present
- Country: United States
- Language: English
- Budget: Total (38 films): $7.464–7.949 billion
- Box office: Total (38 films): $35.156 billion

Marvel Cinematic Universe Phases
- The Infinity Saga; Phase One (2008–2012); Phase Two (2013–2015); Phase Three (2016–2019)
- The Multiverse Saga; Phase Four (2021–2022); Phase Five (2023–2025); Phase Six (2025–2027)

The Marvel Cinematic Universe (MCU) centers on American superhero films produced by Marvel Studios, based on characters from Marvel Comics publications. The MCU is the shared universe in which all of the films are set. Marvel Studios has released 38 films since 2008 and has at least eight more in various stages of development.

Marvel Studios president Kevin Feige has produced every MCU film, with some films having additional producers and production companies. The Spider-Man films are owned, financed, and distributed by Sony Pictures and co-produced by Sony's Columbia Pictures and Pascal Pictures. The MCU films are written and directed by various individuals and feature large, often ensemble, casts. They are released in groups called "Phases", with three phases making up a "Saga". The MCU is the highest-grossing film franchise of all time, grossing over $35.1 billion at the global box office. This includes Avengers: Endgame, which is the highest-grossing film ever.

The films from Phases One, Two, and Three are collectively known as "The Infinity Saga". The first MCU film, Iron Man (2008), was distributed by Paramount Pictures. Paramount also distributed Iron Man 2 (2010), Thor (2011), and Captain America: The First Avenger (2011), while Universal Pictures distributed The Incredible Hulk (2008). Walt Disney Studios Motion Pictures began distributing the series with the crossover film The Avengers (2012), which concluded Phase One. Phase Two comprises Iron Man 3 (2013), Thor: The Dark World (2013), Captain America: The Winter Soldier (2014), Guardians of the Galaxy (2014), Avengers: Age of Ultron (2015), and Ant-Man (2015). Captain America: Civil War (2016) started Phase Three, followed by Doctor Strange (2016), Guardians of the Galaxy Vol. 2 (2017), Spider-Man: Homecoming (2017), Thor: Ragnarok (2017), Black Panther (2018), Avengers: Infinity War (2018), Ant-Man and the Wasp (2018), Captain Marvel (2019), Avengers: Endgame, and Spider-Man: Far From Home (2019).

The films from Phases Four, Five, and Six are collectively known as "The Multiverse Saga". These phases also include television series and television specials streaming on Disney+. The Phase Four films are Black Widow (2021), Shang-Chi and the Legend of the Ten Rings (2021), Eternals (2021), Spider-Man: No Way Home (2021), Doctor Strange in the Multiverse of Madness (2022), Thor: Love and Thunder (2022), and Black Panther: Wakanda Forever (2022). Phase Five features Ant-Man and the Wasp: Quantumania (2023), Guardians of the Galaxy Vol. 3 (2023), The Marvels (2023), Deadpool & Wolverine (2024), Captain America: Brave New World (2025), and Thunderbolts* (2025). Phase Six began with The Fantastic Four: First Steps (2025), and also includes Spider-Man: Brand New Day (2026), Avengers: Doomsday (2026), and Avengers: Secret Wars (2027).

The next MCU saga will start with an X-Men film in 2028, followed by Ghost Rider and Black Panther III later that year.

== Development ==
=== Initial development work for the Infinity Saga ===
By 2005, Marvel Entertainment had begun planning to produce its own films independently and distribute them through Paramount Pictures. In June 2007, Marvel Studios secured funding from a $525 million revolving credit facility with Merrill Lynch. Marvel planned to release individual films for their main characters and then merge them in a crossover film.

Marvel Studios president Kevin Feige said in November 2013 that releases each year would ideally include one film based on an existing character and one featuring a new character, feeling that would be "a nice rhythm", although, this was not always the case as shown by the sequels Iron Man 3 and Thor: The Dark World being released in 2013. Feige elaborated in July 2014 that this model was being followed for 2014 and 2015, and he felt it would be fun to continue. After the reveal that month of multiple release dates for films through 2019, in which some years had three films scheduled, Feige said there was no "number cruncher" telling the studio to increase their film output and the change was based on them "managing [existing] franchises, film to film, and when we have a team ready to go, why tell them to go away for four years just because we don't have a slot? We'd rather find a way to keep that going." After the titles for these films were revealed in October 2014, Feige said the studio was "firing on all cylinders right now" and this made them comfortable with increasing to three films a year in 2017 and 2018 without changing their production approach. On the potential for so-called "superhero fatigue", Feige stated that, although each film is based on Marvel Comics and features the "Marvel Studios" logo, he believed each film had unique qualities that differentiated them from the others and from non-Marvel Cinematic Universe (MCU) superhero films. For example, he noted how the studio's 2016 releases, Captain America: Civil War and Doctor Strange, were "completely different movies". The studio hoped to continue to surprise audiences and "not [fall] into things becoming too similar".

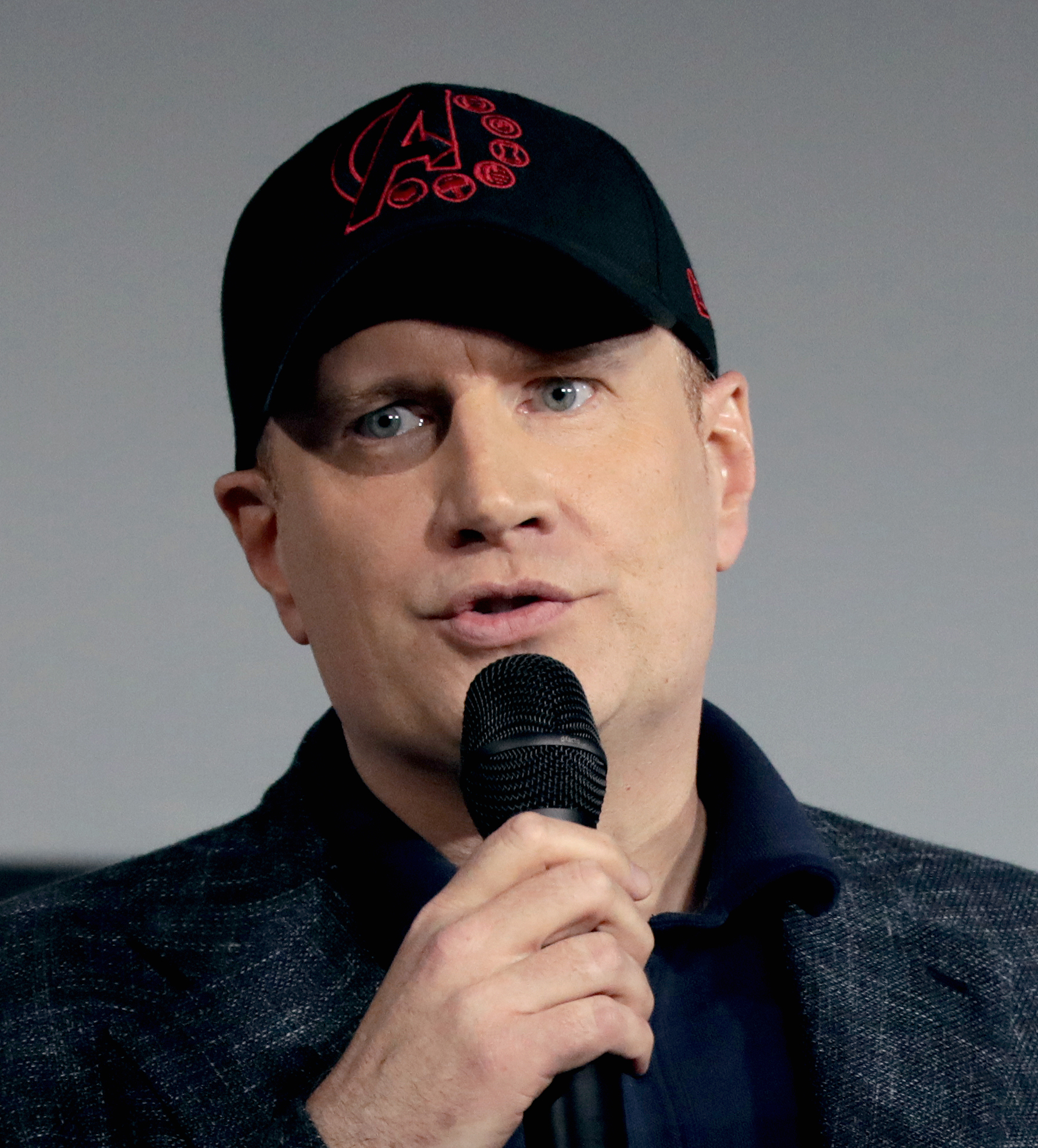
Marvel Studios president Kevin Feige helped conceive a shared media universe of Marvel properties.

In February 2014, Feige said Marvel Studios wanted to mimic the "rhythm" of comic book releases by having characters appear in their own films and then come together for crossover events, with Avengers films acting as "big, giant linchpins" within the shared universe. On expanding the number of characters in the universe and letting individual films breathe and work on their own, as opposed to having Avenger team-ups outside of Avengers films, Feige said they planned to teach general audiences "about the notion of the characters existing separately, coming together for specific events and going away and existing separately in their own worlds again. Just like comic readers have been doing for decades... people sort of are accepting that there's just a time when they should be together and there's a time when they're not." Discussing how much story is developed for future MCU films, Feige said in September 2015 that "broad strokes" and occasionally "super-specific things" are determined far in advance. He said there was enough leeway to "have room to sway and to move and to go and to surprise ourselves in places that we end up" and that each film would feel satisfying on its own, but still interconnected to the larger universe and as if it had been planned years ahead of time. The studio has contingency plans for times when they are unable to secure a certain actor to reprise a role, and can respond to surprises such as the film rights to use Spider-Man becoming available in February 2015.

Feige discussed moving the MCU to Phase Four in April 2016, reflecting on the first three phases of films and saying, "I think there will be a finality to moments of Phase Three, as well as new beginnings that will mark a different, a very different, a distinctively different chapter in what will someday be a complete first saga made up of three Phases." Frequent MCU director Joe Russo added that Phase Three was the "deconstruction Phase" of the MCU, beginning with Civil War and leading into "the culmination films" of Avengers: Infinity War (2018) and Avengers: Endgame (2019). A year later, Feige felt after the conclusion of Phase Three, Marvel might abandon grouping the films by Phases, saying, "it might be a new thing". Feige mentioned that Avengers: Endgame would provide "a definitive end" to the films and storylines preceding it, with the franchise having "two distinct periods. Everything before [Endgame] and everything after". Many of the films that were planned to follow Endgame were intentionally different from the films in "The Infinity Saga", which includes Phase One, Phase Two, and Phase Three.

=== Expansion to the Multiverse Saga and shifting approach ===
In July 2019, Feige announced the Phase Four slate at San Diego Comic-Con, consisting of films and television event series for the streaming service Disney+. In December 2020, at Disney's Investor Day, Marvel provided updates to previously announced films for the Phase. In late June 2022, Feige said audiences would begin to see where the next saga of the MCU would be heading as Phase Four neared its conclusion, adding that there had been many clues throughout the Phase to what that would be. He said Marvel Studios would be a "little more direct" on their future plans in the following months to provide audiences with "the bigger picture". In July 2022, Feige unveiled the Phase Five and Six slates at San Diego Comic-Con, similarly consisting of films and Disney+ series, and revealed that these three Phases would make up "The Multiverse Saga".

In May 2024, Disney CEO Bob Iger said the company planned to release two, or at most three, Marvel films a year moving forward, down from four films being released in some recent years, as part of Disney's larger strategy to reduce its content output and focus on quality. At that time, four films were still expected to be released in both 2025 and 2026. Iger said Marvel content would continue to balance sequels with new franchises. Later in 2024, Disney removed the long-in-development film Blade from its 2025 release date and also removed an unspecified Marvel film that was scheduled for July 2026, which was replaced by Sony Pictures's Spider-Man: Brand New Day. Feige said the three films that were still scheduled for 2025 had been in development for a long time and were ready for release. He expected Marvel Studios to start releasing two films a year from 2026, but said there was potential for anywhere between one and three films in some years. In May 2025, Iger called Thunderbolts* the "first and best example" of Marvel Studios' refocusing efforts.

Further changes to Marvel Studios' release slate resulted in over a year gap between The Fantastic Four: First Steps (2025) and Brand New Day; this would be the longest gap between MCU film releases since the gap between Spider-Man: Far From Home (2019) and Black Widow (2021), which was impacted by the COVID-19 pandemic. In July 2025, Feige said the studio was working to reduce its film budgets, which had increased since Endgame in part due to the pandemic. He said the budgets for their 2024 and 2025 films were a third lower than those for 2022 and 2023. Marvel Studios executives met with the creative team behind the film The Creator (2023) to understand how that film was made with a relatively low $80 million budget. Additionally, Feige stated that Marvel Studios had made a deal to film many of their then-upcoming films at Pinewood Studios in the United Kingdom, where several of their other films had previously been shot. He said Marvel Studios anticipated utilizing studio space in Georgia and New York as well, rather than California, because of those states' production tax credits. However, The Wall Street Journal reported that Marvel would largely forego shooting in Georgia because of its rising costs, instead choosing to shoot in the United Kingdom because it had become cheaper to do so.

Feige called Deadpool & Wolverine (2024) the true start to Marvel Studios' exploration and use of the Fox characters following Disney's acquisition of assets from 21st Century Fox in 2019, and said every project after it would be part of the MCU's "Mutant era". The next MCU saga after the Multiverse Saga is expected to center on the Fox characters, including the X-Men. Feige reportedly had a 10-year plan for the X-Men in the MCU by May 2025. In July 2025, Feige said Marvel Studios was "already well into development" on the three phases of their next saga following the conclusion of the Multiverse Saga with Secret Wars. He said Phase Seven would be "directly impacted" by the films of Phase Six. A year later, Feige said Secret Wars would "establish a streamlined, simplified, single universe that audiences can keep up with. Some things will be familiar, but many, many things will be entirely new." He said the X-Men would be core to the next era of the MCU, which he called the "Mutant Saga", and noted that those characters have their own universe and "multi-stage saga" in the comics.

Following several critical and financial failures, the studio began testing its films through test screenings organized by the National Research Group (NRG). The studio previously relied on "friends-and-family" test screenings at Walt Disney Studios in Burbank, California, to help maintain secrecy. Feige said the NRG tests yielded results similar to their own.

== Films ==
Marvel Studios releases its films in groups called "Phases", with three phases making up a "Saga".

=== The Infinity Saga ===
The films from Phases One, Two, and Three are collectively known as "The Infinity Saga".

==== Phase One ====
Phase One films
Film	U.S. release date	Directed by	Screenplay by	Produced by
Iron Man	May 2, 2008	Jon Favreau	Mark Fergus & Hawk Ostby and Art Marcum & Matt Holloway	Avi Arad and Kevin Feige
The Incredible Hulk	June 13, 2008	Louis Leterrier	Zak Penn	Avi Arad, Gale Anne Hurd, and Kevin Feige
Iron Man 2	May 7, 2010	Jon Favreau	Justin Theroux	Kevin Feige
Thor	May 6, 2011	Kenneth Branagh	Ashley Edward Miller & Zack Stentz and Don Payne	Kevin Feige
Captain America: The First Avenger	July 22, 2011	Joe Johnston	Christopher Markus & Stephen McFeely	Kevin Feige
The Avengers	May 4, 2012	Joss Whedon	Joss Whedon	Kevin Feige

==== Phase Two ====
Phase Two films
Film	U.S. release date	Directed by	Screenplay by	Produced by
Iron Man 3	May 3, 2013	Shane Black	Drew Pearce & Shane Black	Kevin Feige
Thor: The Dark World	November 8, 2013	Alan Taylor	Christopher L. Yost and Christopher Markus & Stephen McFeely	Kevin Feige
Captain America: The Winter Soldier	April 4, 2014	Anthony and Joe Russo	Christopher Markus & Stephen McFeely	Kevin Feige
Guardians of the Galaxy	August 1, 2014	James Gunn	James Gunn and Nicole Perlman	Kevin Feige
Avengers: Age of Ultron	May 1, 2015	Joss Whedon	Joss Whedon	Kevin Feige
Ant-Man	July 17, 2015	Peyton Reed	Edgar Wright & Joe Cornish and Adam McKay & Paul Rudd	Kevin Feige

==== Phase Three ====
Phase Three films
Film	U.S. release date	Directed by	Screenplay by	Produced by
Captain America: Civil War	May 6, 2016	Anthony and Joe Russo	Christopher Markus & Stephen McFeely	Kevin Feige
Doctor Strange	November 4, 2016	Scott Derrickson	Jon Spaihts and Scott Derrickson & C. Robert Cargill	Kevin Feige
Guardians of the Galaxy Vol. 2	May 5, 2017	James Gunn	James Gunn	Kevin Feige
Spider-Man: Homecoming	July 7, 2017	Jon Watts	Jonathan Goldstein & John Francis Daley and Jon Watts & Christopher Ford and Chris McKenna & Erik Sommers	Kevin Feige and Amy Pascal
Thor: Ragnarok	November 3, 2017	Taika Waititi	Eric Pearson and Craig Kyle & Christopher L. Yost	Kevin Feige
Black Panther	February 16, 2018	Ryan Coogler	Ryan Coogler & Joe Robert Cole	Kevin Feige
Avengers: Infinity War	April 27, 2018	Anthony and Joe Russo	Christopher Markus & Stephen McFeely	Kevin Feige
Ant-Man and the Wasp	July 6, 2018	Peyton Reed	Chris McKenna & Erik Sommers and Paul Rudd & Andrew Barrer & Gabriel Ferrari	Kevin Feige and Stephen Broussard
Captain Marvel	March 8, 2019	Anna Boden & Ryan Fleck	Anna Boden & Ryan Fleck & Geneva Robertson-Dworet	Kevin Feige
Avengers: Endgame	April 26, 2019	Anthony and Joe Russo	Christopher Markus & Stephen McFeely	Kevin Feige
Spider-Man: Far From Home	July 2, 2019	Jon Watts	Chris McKenna & Erik Sommers	Kevin Feige and Amy Pascal

=== The Multiverse Saga ===
The films from Phases Four, Five, and Six are collectively known as "The Multiverse Saga". These phases also include television series and television specials streaming on Disney+.

==== Phase Four ====
Phase Four films
Film	U.S. release date	Directed by	Screenplay by	Produced by
Black Widow	July 9, 2021 (Note: Black Widow was released concurrently on Disney+ with Premier Access.)	Cate Shortland	Eric Pearson	Kevin Feige
Shang-Chi and the Legend of the Ten Rings	September 3, 2021	Destin Daniel Cretton	Dave Callaham & Destin Daniel Cretton & Andrew Lanham	Kevin Feige and Jonathan Schwartz
Eternals	November 5, 2021	Chloé Zhao	Chloé Zhao and Chloé Zhao & Patrick Burleigh and Ryan Firpo & Kaz Firpo (Note: Zhao is credited both as a solo writer and as part of a writing team with Burleigh.)	Kevin Feige and Nate Moore
Spider-Man: No Way Home	December 17, 2021	Jon Watts	Chris McKenna & Erik Sommers	Kevin Feige and Amy Pascal
Doctor Strange in the Multiverse of Madness	May 6, 2022	Sam Raimi	Michael Waldron	Kevin Feige
Thor: Love and Thunder	July 8, 2022	Taika Waititi	Taika Waititi & Jennifer Kaytin Robinson	Kevin Feige and Brad Winderbaum
Black Panther: Wakanda Forever	November 11, 2022	Ryan Coogler	Ryan Coogler & Joe Robert Cole	Kevin Feige and Nate Moore

==== Phase Five ====
Phase Five films
Film	U.S. release date	Directed by	Screenplay by	Produced by
Ant-Man and the Wasp: Quantumania	February 17, 2023	Peyton Reed	Jeff Loveness	Kevin Feige and Stephen Broussard
Guardians of the Galaxy Vol. 3	May 5, 2023	James Gunn	James Gunn	Kevin Feige
The Marvels	November 10, 2023	Nia DaCosta	Nia DaCosta and Megan McDonnell and Elissa Karasik	Kevin Feige
Deadpool & Wolverine	July 26, 2024	Shawn Levy	Ryan Reynolds & Rhett Reese & Paul Wernick & Zeb Wells & Shawn Levy	Kevin Feige, Lauren Shuler Donner, Ryan Reynolds, and Shawn Levy
Captain America: Brave New World	February 14, 2025	Julius Onah	Rob Edwards and Malcolm Spellman & Dalan Musson and Julius Onah & Peter Glanz	Kevin Feige and Nate Moore
Thunderbolts* (Note: The asterisk denotes the alternate title, The New Avengers, as revealed in the film's end credits.)	May 2, 2025	Jake Schreier	Eric Pearson and Joanna Calo	Kevin Feige

==== Phase Six ====
Phase Six films
Film	U.S. release date	Directed by	Screenplay by	Produced by	Status
The Fantastic Four: First Steps	July 25, 2025	Matt Shakman	Josh Friedman and Eric Pearson and Jeff Kaplan & Ian Springer	Kevin Feige	Released
Spider-Man: Brand New Day	July 31, 2026	Destin Daniel Cretton	Chris McKenna & Erik Sommers	Kevin Feige, Amy Pascal, Avi Arad, and Rachel O'Connor	Released
Avengers: Doomsday	December 18, 2026	Anthony and Joe Russo	Stephen McFeely and Michael Waldron	Kevin Feige, Louis D'Esposito, and Jonathan Schwartz	Post-production
Avengers: Secret Wars	December 17, 2027	Anthony and Joe Russo	Michael Waldron and Stephen McFeely and Chris McKenna & Erik Sommers	Kevin Feige, Louis D'Esposito, and Jonathan Schwartz	Pre-production

=== Phase Seven ===
After the Multiverse Saga, the next MCU saga is expected to center on characters that Marvel Studios inherited during the acquisition of 21st Century Fox by Disney, including the X-Men. Feige reportedly had a 10-year plan for the X-Men in the MCU by May 2025.

Phase Seven films
Film	U.S. release date	Directed by	Screenplay by	Produced by	Status
Untitled X-Men film	May 5, 2028	Jake Schreier	Michael Lesslie and Joanna Calo & Lee Sung Jin	Kevin Feige	Pre-production
Ghost Rider	July 28, 2028	Shawn Levy	Jonathan Tropper	Kevin Feige, Louis D'Esposito, Stephen Broussard, Shawn Levy, and Ryan Gosling	Pre-production
Black Panther III	December 15, 2028	Ryan Coogler	Ryan Coogler	Kevin Feige and Nate Moore	In development

==== Untitled X-Men film (2028) ====
At SDCC in July 2019, Kevin Feige said mutants, which include the X-Men, would be introduced to the MCU, and they would differ from 20th Century Fox's X-Men film series. Michael Lesslie entered negotiations to write a new X-Men film in May 2024, and was confirmed to be writing it a year later. Jake Schreier was announced as director following positive responses to his film Thunderbolts* (2025). After bringing back actors from Fox's X-Men films for the Multiverse Saga, Feige said this film would feature a recast X-Men team following the MCU's "reset" in Secret Wars. He said it would be "a very youth-oriented, focused and cast movie". Schreier revealed in April 2026 that Joanna Calo and Lee Sung Jin were writing a new draft of the script after they collaborated with him on Thunderbolts* and the television series Beef (2023–present). Following an active casting process, the first actors were announced in August 2026, including Sadie Sink reprising her role as Jean Grey from the film Spider-Man: Brand New Day (2026). The film is scheduled for release on May 5, 2028.

==== Ghost Rider (2028) ====
Marvel Studios regained the film rights to the character Ghost Rider from Sony Pictures and Columbia Pictures in May 2013. Those companies produced the films Ghost Rider (2007) and Ghost Rider: Spirit of Vengeance (2011), both starring Nicolas Cage as the Johnny Blaze incarnation of the character. After Ryan Gosling publicly expressed interest in portraying Ghost Rider in the MCU in 2022, Feige suggested that he was open to that. At SDCC in July 2026, Gosling was confirmed to be starring in a new Ghost Rider film to be directed by Shawn Levy and written by Jonathan Tropper. Levy previously directed Deadpool & Wolverine for Marvel Studios, and worked with Gosling and Tropper on the film Star Wars: Starfighter (2027). Gosling was reported to be portraying Johnny Blaze / Ghost Rider. Marvel Studios' Feige, Louis D'Esposito, and Stephen Broussard produce along with Levy and Gosling. Filming is expected to begin in 2027 in New York. The film is scheduled to be released on July 28, 2028.

==== Black Panther III (2028) ====
By November 2022, writer and director Ryan Coogler had discussed a potential third Black Panther film with Feige. Former Marvel Studios executive Nate Moore–who left the studio in March 2025–returned to produce the film alongside Marvel Studios. In November 2025, Coogler confirmed that Black Panther III would be his next film and said development had begun. At SDCC in July 2026, Feige and Coogler announced that David Jonsson had been cast as an adult version of T'Challa II / Toussaint, who was introduced as a child in the film Black Panther: Wakanda Forever (2022) and would take on the mantle of Black Panther in Black Panther III. The film is scheduled for release on December 15, 2028.

=== Future ===
Future films of the Marvel Cinematic Universe
Film	U.S. release date	Directed by	Screenplay by	Produced by	Status
Armor Wars	TBA	TBA	Yassir Lester	Kevin Feige	In development
Untitled Nova film	TBA	TBA	Michael Waldron	Kevin Feige	In development
Untitled Shang-Chi and the Legend of the Ten Rings sequel	TBA	Destin Daniel Cretton	Destin Daniel Cretton & David Callaham	Kevin Feige and Jonathan Schwartz	In development

Disney has reserved release dates for unspecified Marvel Studios films on May 4, July 13, and November 9, 2029. At any given time, Marvel Studios has future films planned around five to six years out from what they have announced. In July 2025, Feige said they had a seven-year plan through 2032 with potential films on magnets that could be moved around. Marvel Studios was looking to release one to three films a year at that point. A year later, he said potential films were planned through 2042.

In February 2025, producer Nate Moore said work on some projects, such as Armor Wars, had slowed down since the studio began reducing content output and focusing on quality. By that May, Marvel Studios was set to gauge the interest of frequent writer Eric Pearson in projects that were planned for after Avengers: Secret Wars.

==== Armor Wars ====
James Rhodes must confront one of Tony Stark's greatest fears when Stark's tech falls into the wrong hands.

In December 2020, Marvel Studios announced Armor Wars as a Disney+ series based on the 1987–1988 comic book storyline "Armor Wars", with Don Cheadle reprising his role as James Rhodes / War Machine. In August 2021, Yassir Lester was hired as the series' head writer. In September 2022, Marvel Studios decided to rework the series into a feature film, with Cheadle and Lester remaining with the project. Development had slowed down by February 2025.

Armor Wars is set after the events of Secret Invasion (2023). Walton Goggins was set to reprise his role as Sonny Burch from Ant-Man and the Wasp (2018).

==== Untitled Nova film ====
A television series featuring the character Richard Rider / Nova was revealed to be in development in March 2022, with Sabir Pirzada writing. Development had slowed down by February 2023 amid Disney's larger decision to scale back content output and costs. In July 2024, Feige confirmed the series would feature Rider and anticipated that it would be released three or four years later. That December, Ed Bernero was hired as writer and showrunner, but the series was put on pause in February 2025. Michael Waldron was revealed in July 2026 to be writing a script for a Nova film that was in early development as a reworking of the series. Waldron was also considering directing the film if it were to move forward.

==== Untitled Shang-Chi and the Legend of the Ten Rings sequel ====
In December 2021, a sequel to Shang-Chi and the Legend of the Ten Rings (2021) was announced to be in development, with Destin Daniel Cretton returning to write and direct. Simu Liu was expected to return as Shang-Chi by the following month. In September 2024, Cretton was chosen to direct Brand New Day, which was a higher priority for Marvel Studios than the Shang-Chi sequel. In June 2026, Cretton said that they were still developing the sequel and attributed its long development to the impacts of the COVID-19 pandemic. The following month, Cretton confirmed that David Callaham, who was a writer on the first film, was also writing on the sequel.

==== Other ====
By November 2021, Marvel Studios was working on an unknown project with Scarlett Johansson, who would serve as a producer. The project was still being developed by mid-June 2023, when work was paused due to the 2023 Writers Guild of America strike. In June 2025, a sequel to The Fantastic Four: First Steps (2025) was reported to be in development.

By May 2025, Ryan Reynolds had begun working on various script treatments for an ensemble film centered on "three or four" X-Men characters alongside Deadpool. The Hollywood Reporter reported that using Deadpool in a supporting role would allow the X-Men characters "to be used in unexpected ways" and that Reynolds was working independently of Marvel Studios for the time being to figure out the film's concept. Reynolds reiterated in April 2026 that he wanted Deadpool to be a supporting character and part of a group of characters for the next film, and said in July that another Deadpool film would be happening "eventually" and wanted to explore some "deep cuts" from the comics. Justin Kroll at Deadline Hollywood reported that the next Deadpool film was in early development and had no writer or director attached.

== Recurring cast and characters ==
List indicators

This section includes characters who will appear or have appeared in films in multiple Phases within the Marvel Cinematic Universe, and received main billing credit for at least three films (see FAQ).

- A dark grey cell indicates the character was not in the film, or that the character's presence has not yet been confirmed.
- A ^{C} indicates an uncredited cameo role.
- A ^{P} indicates an appearance in onscreen photographs.
- A ^{V} indicates a voice-only role.

Recurring cast and characters of Marvel Cinematic Universe films
Character	Phase One	Phase Two	Phase Three	Phase Four	Phase Five	Phase Six
Bruce Banner Hulk	Edward Norton; Lou Ferrigno^{V} Mark Ruffalo	Mark Ruffalo	Mark Ruffalo	Mark Ruffalo^{C}		Mark Ruffalo
James "Bucky" Barnes Winter Soldier / White Wolf	Sebastian Stan	Sebastian Stan	Sebastian Stan		Sebastian Stan	Sebastian Stan
Clint Barton Hawkeye	Jeremy Renner	Jeremy Renner	Jeremy Renner	Jeremy Renner^{C} ^{P} ^{V}		
Yelena Belova				Florence Pugh	Florence Pugh	Florence Pugh
Peggy Carter	Hayley Atwell	Hayley Atwell	Hayley Atwell			Hayley Atwell
Carol Danvers Captain Marvel			Brie Larson	Brie Larson^{C}	Brie Larson	
Drax the Destroyer		Dave Bautista	Dave Bautista	Dave Bautista	Dave Bautista	
Jane Foster Mighty Thor	Natalie Portman	Natalie Portman	Natalie Portman	Natalie Portman		
Nick Fury	Samuel L. Jackson	Samuel L. Jackson	Samuel L. Jackson		Samuel L. Jackson	Samuel L. Jackson
Gamora		Zoe Saldaña	Zoe Saldaña		Zoe Saldaña	
Groot		Vin Diesel^{V}	Vin Diesel^{V}	Vin Diesel^{V}	Vin Diesel^{V}	
Heimdall	Idris Elba	Idris Elba	Idris Elba	Idris Elba		
Maria Hill	Cobie Smulders	Cobie Smulders	Cobie Smulders			
Happy Hogan	Jon Favreau	Jon Favreau	Jon Favreau	Jon Favreau	Jon Favreau	
Michelle "MJ" Jones-Watson			Zendaya	Zendaya		Zendaya
Scott Lang Ant-Man		Paul Rudd	Paul Rudd		Paul Rudd	Paul Rudd
Ned Leeds			Jacob Batalon	Jacob Batalon		Jacob Batalon
Loki	Tom Hiddleston	Tom Hiddleston	Tom Hiddleston		Tom Hiddleston^{C}	Tom Hiddleston
Mantis			Pom Klementieff	Pom Klementieff	Pom Klementieff	
Wanda Maximoff Scarlet Witch		Elizabeth Olsen	Elizabeth Olsen	Elizabeth Olsen		
M'Baku			Winston Duke	Winston Duke		Winston Duke
Nebula		Karen Gillan	Karen Gillan	Karen Gillan	Karen Gillan	
Odin	Anthony Hopkins	Anthony Hopkins	Anthony Hopkins			
Okoye			Danai Gurira	Danai Gurira		
May Parker			Marisa Tomei	Marisa Tomei		Marisa Tomei
Peter Parker Spider-Man			Tom Holland	Tom Holland		Tom Holland
Pepper Potts	Gwyneth Paltrow	Gwyneth Paltrow	Gwyneth Paltrow			
Hank Pym		Michael Douglas	Michael Douglas		Michael Douglas	
Peter Quill Star-Lord		Chris Pratt	Chris Pratt	Chris Pratt	Chris Pratt	
James "Rhodey" Rhodes War Machine / Iron Patriot	Terrence Howard Don Cheadle	Don Cheadle	Don Cheadle			
Rocket		Bradley Cooper^{V}	Bradley Cooper^{V}	Bradley Cooper^{V}	Bradley Cooper^{V}	
Steve Rogers Captain America	Chris Evans	Chris Evans	Chris Evans			Chris Evans
Natasha Romanoff Black Widow	Scarlett Johansson	Scarlett Johansson	Scarlett Johansson	Scarlett Johansson		
Everett K. Ross			Martin Freeman	Martin Freeman		
Thaddeus Ross Red Hulk	William Hurt		William Hurt	William Hurt	Harrison Ford	
Erik Selvig	Stellan Skarsgård	Stellan Skarsgård		Stellan Skarsgård		
Alexei Shostakov Red Guardian				David Harbour	David Harbour	David Harbour
Shuri Black Panther			Letitia Wright	Letitia Wright		Letitia Wright
Sif	Jaimie Alexander	Jaimie Alexander		Jaimie Alexander		
Tony Stark Iron Man	Robert Downey Jr.	Robert Downey Jr.	Robert Downey Jr.			
Ava Starr Ghost			Hannah John-Kamen		Hannah John-Kamen	Hannah John-Kamen
Stephen Strange			Benedict Cumberbatch	Benedict Cumberbatch		
Thor	Chris Hemsworth	Chris Hemsworth	Chris Hemsworth	Chris Hemsworth		Chris Hemsworth
Valkyrie			Tessa Thompson	Tessa Thompson	Tessa Thompson	
Hope van Dyne Wasp		Evangeline Lilly	Evangeline Lilly		Evangeline Lilly	
Vision		Paul Bettany	Paul Bettany			
Sam Wilson Falcon / Captain America		Anthony Mackie	Anthony Mackie		Anthony Mackie	Anthony Mackie
Wong			Benedict Wong	Benedict Wong		

== Release ==
=== Theatrical distribution ===
Over time, the distribution rights to Marvel Studios' films have changed hands on multiple occasions. In November 2006, Universal Pictures announced that it would distribute The Incredible Hulk (2008), in an arrangement separate from Marvel's 2005 deal with Paramount, which was distributing Marvel's other films. In September 2008, after the international success of Iron Man (2008), Paramount signed a deal to have worldwide distribution rights for Iron Man 2 (2010), Iron Man 3 (2013), Thor (2011), Captain America: The First Avenger (2011), and The Avengers (2012).

In late December 2009, the Walt Disney Company purchased Marvel Entertainment for $4 billion. Additionally, in October 2010, Walt Disney Studios bought the distribution rights for The Avengers and Iron Man 3 from Paramount Pictures, with Paramount's logo remaining on the films, as well as for promotional material and merchandise, although Walt Disney Studios Motion Pictures is the only studio credited at the end of these films. Disney has distributed all subsequent Marvel Studios films. In July 2013, Disney purchased the distribution rights to Iron Man, Iron Man 2, Thor and Captain America: The First Avenger from Paramount. The Incredible Hulk was not part of the deal at the time, due to an agreement between Marvel and Universal, where Marvel owns the film rights and Universal owns the distribution rights, for this film as well as the right of first refusal to distribute future Hulk films. According to The Hollywood Reporter, a potential reason why Marvel has not bought the film distribution rights to the Hulk as they did with Paramount for the Iron Man, Thor, and Captain America films is that Universal holds the theme park rights to several Marvel characters that Disney wants for its own theme parks. In June 2023, the distribution rights to The Incredible Hulk reverted from Universal back to Marvel Studios and Disney.

In April 2026, Disney announced their "Infinity Vision" certification for premium large formats, informing audiences which theaters offer "the biggest, brightest, and most immersive cinematic experiences" and meet certain technical standards. The re-release of Endgame in September 2026 will be Marvel Studios' first film in Infinity Vision, followed by Doomsday in December 2026.

==== Spider-Man films ====
In February 2015, Sony Pictures Entertainment and Marvel Studios announced a licensing deal that would allow Spider-Man to appear in the Marvel Cinematic Universe, with the character first appearing in Captain America: Civil War. Spider-Man films produced by Marvel Studios would continue to be financed, distributed, and controlled by Sony Pictures. In June 2015, Feige clarified that the initial Sony deal does not apply to the MCU television series, as it was "very specific ... with a certain amount of back and forth allowed". Both studios can terminate the agreement at any point, and no money was exchanged with the deal. However, a small adjustment was made to a 2011 deal formed between the two studios (where Marvel gained full control of Spider-Man's merchandising rights, in exchange for making a one-time payment of $175 million to Sony and paying up to $35 million for each future Spider-Man film, and forgoing receiving their previous 5% of any Spider-Man film's revenue), with Marvel getting to reduce their $35 million payment to Sony if Spider-Man: Homecoming grossed more than $750 million. Marvel Studios still received 5% of first dollar gross for the film. Sony also paid Marvel Studios an undisclosed producer fee for Homecoming.

In August 2019, it was reported that Disney and Sony could not reach a new agreement regarding Spider-Man films, with Marvel Studios and Feige said to no longer have any involvement in future films. Deadline Hollywood noted that Disney had hoped future films would be a "50/50 co-financing arrangement between the studios", with the possibility to extend the deal to other Spider-Man-related films, an offer Sony rejected and did not counter. Instead, Sony hoped to keep the terms of the previous agreement (Marvel receiving 5% of the film's first dollar gross), with Disney refusing. The Hollywood Reporter added that the lack of a new agreement would see the end of Holland's Spider-Man in the MCU. Variety cited unnamed sources claiming negotiations had "hit an impasse" and that a new deal could still be reached. In September 2019, it was announced that Disney and Sony had reached a new agreement allowing for Spider-Man to appear in Spider-Man: No Way Home (2021) as the third film co-produced by Marvel Studios and Sony Pictures and a future Marvel Studios film. Disney was reported to be co-financing 25% of the film in exchange for 25% of the film's profits in the new agreement, while retaining the merchandising rights to the character.

In November 2021, producer Amy Pascal revealed that Sony and Marvel Studios were planning to make at least three more Spider-Man films starring Holland, with work on the first of those films getting ready to begin. However, The Hollywood Reporter noted that there were no official plans for a new trilogy, despite the strong working relationship between the studios. The following month, Feige said that he, Pascal, Disney, and Sony were "actively beginning to develop" the next Spider-Man story, assuring that there would not be any "separation trauma" that occurred between Far From Home and No Way Home. Sony's agreement specifies that production has to start on a film within three years and nine months of the previous one, and release within five years and nine months, otherwise the rights revert to Marvel. Sony and Marvel's agreement occurs on a film-by-film basis.

Marvel Studios explored opportunities to integrate other characters of the Marvel Cinematic Universe into their Spider-Man films, with Robert Downey Jr. reprising his role as Tony Stark / Iron Man in Spider-Man: Homecoming (2017), Samuel L. Jackson reprising his role as Nick Fury in Spider-Man: Far From Home (2019), and Benedict Cumberbatch as Dr. Stephen Strange in No Way Home. Jon Bernthal, Mark Ruffalo, and Florence Pugh appear as their respective MCU characters Frank Castle, Bruce Banner / Hulk, and Yelena Belova / Black Widow in Spider-Man: Brand New Day (2026). Aaron Couch and Borys Kit of The Hollywood Reporter compared this to the Marvel Team-Up comic books that feature Spider-Man teaming up with different heroes.

=== Home media ===
==== Physical ====
In June 2012, Marvel announced a 10-disc box set titled "Marvel Cinematic Universe: Phase One – Avengers Assembled", for release on September 25, 2012. The box set includes all six of the Phase One films—Iron Man, The Incredible Hulk, Iron Man 2, Thor, Captain America: The First Avenger, and The Avengers—on Blu-ray and Blu-ray 3D, in a replica of Nick Fury's briefcase from The Avengers. In August 2012, luggage company Rimowa GmbH, who developed the briefcase for The Avengers, filed suit against Marvel Studios and Buena Vista Home Entertainment in U.S. federal court, complaining that "Marvel did not obtain any license or authorization from Rimowa to make replica copies of the cases for any purpose." The set was delayed to early 2013 for the packaging to be redesigned. The box set, with a redesigned case, was released on April 2, 2013. In addition, the box set included a featurette on the then-upcoming Phase Two films, showing footage and concept art, as well as previously unreleased deleted scenes from all of the Phase One films.

In July 2015, Marvel announced a 13-disc box set titled "Marvel Cinematic Universe: Phase Two Collection", for release on December 8, 2015, exclusive to Amazon.com. The box set includes all six of the Phase Two films—Iron Man 3, Thor: The Dark World, Captain America: The Winter Soldier, Guardians of the Galaxy, Avengers: Age of Ultron, and Ant-Man—on Blu-ray, Blu-ray 3D, and a digital copy, in a replica of the Orb from Guardians of the Galaxy, plus a bonus disc and exclusive memorabilia. Material on the bonus disc includes all of the Marvel One-Shots with commentary, deleted scenes and pre-production creative features for each of the films, featurettes on the making of the post-credit scenes for the films, and first looks at Captain America: Civil War, Doctor Strange, and Guardians of the Galaxy Vol. 2.

In September 2019, Feige indicated a box set with all 23 films of "The Infinity Saga" would be released, with the set including previously unreleased deleted scenes and other footage, such as an alternate take of the Nick Fury post-credits scene from Iron Man which references Spider-Man, the Hulk, and the X-Men. The box set, featuring all 23 films on Ultra HD Blu-ray and Blu-ray, a bonus disc, a letter from Feige, and a lithograph art piece by Matt Ferguson, was released on November 15, 2019, exclusively at Best Buy.

==== Streaming and cable ====
In March 2008, Marvel Studios presold the US cable broadcast rights to FX for five of their films, including Iron Man and The Incredible Hulk, for four years. FX also acquired the rights to Iron Man 3 in May 2013. In September 2014, TNT acquired the US cable broadcast rights to five Marvel Studios films, beginning with Avengers: Age of Ultron, for broadcast two years after their theatrical release.

Every Marvel Studios release from January 2016 to December 2018 was available on Netflix. Captain Marvel was the first Walt Disney Studios Motion Pictures-distributed film not to stream on Netflix, after Disney let their licensing deal with them expire. It became the first theatrical Disney release to stream exclusively on Disney+, which launched on November 12, 2019.

In April 2021, Sony signed a deal with Disney for its theatrical releases from 2022 to 2026 to stream on Disney+ and Hulu and appear on Disney's linear television networks for their "pay 2 window". As well, Sony's legacy content, including past Spider-Man films and Marvel content in Sony's Spider-Man Universe (SSU), would be able to be streamed on Disney+ and Hulu. Disney's access to Sony's titles would come following their availability on Netflix for their "pay 1 window". Homecoming and Spider-Man: Far From Home (2019) had previously been available on Starz and FX. Homecoming became available on Disney+ in the United States on May 12, 2023, Far From Home became available on November 3, 2023, and No Way Home became available on April 15, 2026. The Incredible Hulk became available on Disney+ in the United States on June 16, 2023, following the film's distribution rights reverting to Marvel Studios.

In January 2026, Sony and Netflix signed a new multi-year agreement for Sony titles to stream on Netflix in their "pay 1 window". The new agreement gives Netflix global rights, an increase from the "pay 1" rights for the United States, Germany, and Southeast Asia in the previous deal, with the new agreement beginning later in 2026 as territory rights become available before being fully in effect in early 2029.

=== IMAX 10th anniversary festival ===
From August 30 to September 6, 2018, in conjunction with Marvel Studios' 10-year anniversary celebrations, all 20 films released at the time (Iron Man through Ant-Man and the Wasp) were screened in IMAX. The films were shown in release order, with four films per day. The final days of the festival were theme-related, with one showing "origin" films (Iron Man, Spider-Man: Homecoming, Black Panther, and Doctor Strange), one showing "team-ups" (Guardians of the Galaxy Vol. 2, Captain America: Civil War, The Avengers, and Avengers: Infinity War), and the final day showing Iron Man and The Avengers as chosen by the fans via a Twitter poll. The festival also saw Iron Man, The Incredible Hulk, and Captain America: The First Avenger released in IMAX for the first time.

== Reception ==
=== Box office performance ===
The Marvel Cinematic Universe is the highest-grossing film franchise of all time worldwide, both unadjusted and adjusted-for-inflation, having grossed over $35.1 billion at the global box office. Several of its sub-series, such as the Avengers, Iron Man, Captain America, Thor, and Spider-Man film series are among the most successful film series of all time. Avengers: Endgame was the highest-grossing film of all time worldwide between July 2019 and March 2021, overtaking and later surpassed by Avatar (2009), before its September 2026 re-release, subtitled Encore, helped it once again exceed Avatar to reclaim that box-office position and title. With the release of Deadpool & Wolverine (2024), the MCU became the first film franchise to cross $30 billion.

Box office performance of Marvel Cinematic Universe films
Film	U.S. release date	Box office gross			All-time ranking		Budget	Ref.
Film	U.S. release date	U.S. and Canada	Other territories	Worldwide	U.S. and Canada	Worldwide	Budget	Ref.
Phase One
Iron Man	May 2, 2008	$319,034,126	$266,762,121	$585,796,247	89	190	$140 million	
The Incredible Hulk	June 13, 2008	$134,806,913	$129,964,083	$264,770,996	494	625	$137.5–150 million	
Iron Man 2	May 7, 2010	$312,433,331	$311,500,000	$623,933,331	95	172	$170–200 million	
Thor	May 6, 2011	$181,030,624	$268,295,994	$449,326,618	280	290	$150 million	
Captain America: The First Avenger	July 22, 2011	$176,654,505	$193,915,269	$370,569,774	298	394	$140 million	
The Avengers	May 4, 2012	$623,357,910	$897,180,626	$1,520,538,536	12	10	$220 million	
Phase Two
Iron Man 3	May 3, 2013	$409,013,994	$806,563,211	$1,215,577,205	39	25	$200 million	
Thor: The Dark World	November 8, 2013	$206,362,140	$438,421,000	$644,783,140	222	164	$150–170 million	
Captain America: The Winter Soldier	April 4, 2014	$259,766,572	$454,654,931	$714,421,503	134	134	$170–177 million	
Guardians of the Galaxy	August 1, 2014	$333,718,600	$439,631,547	$773,350,147	79	114	$170 million	
Avengers: Age of Ultron	May 1, 2015	$459,005,868	$946,012,180	$1,405,018,048	25	15	$250–444 million	
Ant-Man	July 17, 2015	$180,202,163	$339,109,802	$519,311,965	283	233	$130 million	
Phase Three
Captain America: Civil War	May 6, 2016	$408,084,349	$746,962,067	$1,155,046,416	42	29	$250 million	
Doctor Strange	November 4, 2016	$232,641,920	$445,154,156	$677,796,076	174	155	$165 million	
Guardians of the Galaxy Vol. 2	May 5, 2017	$389,813,101	$473,942,950	$863,756,051	50	88	$200 million	
Spider-Man: Homecoming	July 7, 2017	$334,201,140	$545,965,784	$880,166,924	80	78	$175 million	
Thor: Ragnarok	November 3, 2017	$315,058,289	$540,243,517	$855,301,806	97	92	$180 million	
Black Panther	February 16, 2018	$700,426,566	$674,533,163	$1,374,959,729	6	17	$200 million	
Avengers: Infinity War	April 27, 2018	$678,815,482	$1,373,599,557	$2,052,415,039	8	6	$325–400 million	
Ant-Man and the Wasp	July 6, 2018	$216,648,740	$406,025,399	$622,674,139	204	179	$162 million	
Captain Marvel	March 8, 2019	$426,829,839	$704,586,607	$1,131,416,446	33	33	$150–175 million	
Avengers: Endgame (Note: The following row includes Endgame's 2019 box office, including its June 2019 re-release, plus the box office from its September 2026 re-release, Avengers Endgame: Encore.)	April 26, 2019	$898,462,695	$2,043,715,069	$2,942,177,764	2	2	$356–400 million	
Spider-Man: Far From Home	July 2, 2019	$391,283,774	$746,838,016	$1,138,121,790	49	32	$160 million	
Phase Four
Black Widow	July 9, 2021	$183,651,655	$196,100,000	$379,751,655 (Note: Disney announced that Black Widow also earned $67 million globally from Disney+ Premier Access in its opening weekend.)	290	409	$289 million	
Shang-Chi and the Legend of the Ten Rings	September 3, 2021	$224,543,292	$207,700,000	$432,243,292	193	331	$150–200 million	
Eternals	November 5, 2021	$164,870,234	$237,194,665	$402,064,899	370	377	$236.2 million	
Spider-Man: No Way Home	December 17, 2021	$814,866,759	$1,113,174,146	$1,928,040,905	3	7	$200 million	
Doctor Strange in the Multiverse of Madness	May 6, 2022	$411,331,607	$544,444,197	$955,775,804	44	68	$351 million	
Thor: Love and Thunder	July 8, 2022	$343,256,830	$417,671,251	$760,928,081	77	123	$250 million	
Black Panther: Wakanda Forever	November 11, 2022	$453,829,060	$405,379,776	$859,208,836	30	93	$250 million	
Phase Five
Ant-Man and the Wasp: Quantumania	February 17, 2023	$214,504,909	$261,566,271	$476,071,180	223	286	$388.4 million	
Guardians of the Galaxy Vol. 3	May 5, 2023	$358,995,815	$486,559,962	$845,555,777	70	99	$250 million	
The Marvels	November 10, 2023	$84,500,223	$121,636,602	$206,136,825	1031	922	$375 million	
Deadpool & Wolverine	July 26, 2024	$636,745,858	$701,327,787	$1,338,073,645	12	21	$429 million	
Captain America: Brave New World	February 14, 2025	$200,500,001	$214,601,576	$415,101,577	254	358	$180 million	
Thunderbolts*	May 2, 2025	$190,274,328	$192,162,589	$382,436,917	275	411	$180 million	
Phase Six
The Fantastic Four: First Steps	July 25, 2025	$274,286,610	$247,572,118	$521,858,728	145	265	$200 million	
Spider-Man: Brand New Day	July 31, 2026	$959,006,311	$1,564,141,204	$2,523,147,515	1	3	$225 million	
Total		$14,103,629,956	$21,052,315,444	$35,155,957,102	1	1	$7.464–7.949 billion	

=== Critical and public response ===
Critical and public response of Marvel Cinematic Universe films
Film	Critical		Public	
Film	Rotten Tomatoes	Metacritic	CinemaScore	PostTrak
Phase One
Iron Man	94% (278 reviews)	79 (38 reviews)	A	—N/a
The Incredible Hulk	68% (238 reviews)	61 (38 reviews)	A−	—N/a
Iron Man 2	72% (299 reviews)	57 (40 reviews)	A	—N/a
Thor	77% (292 reviews)	57 (40 reviews)	B+	—N/a
Captain America: The First Avenger	80% (274 reviews)	66 (43 reviews)	A−	—N/a
The Avengers	91% (363 reviews)	69 (43 reviews)	A+	—N/a
Phase Two
Iron Man 3	79% (327 reviews)	62 (44 reviews)	A	—N/a
Thor: The Dark World	67% (289 reviews)	54 (44 reviews)	A−	—N/a
Captain America: The Winter Soldier	90% (311 reviews)	70 (48 reviews)	A	—N/a
Guardians of the Galaxy	91% (337 reviews)	76 (53 reviews)	A	90%
Avengers: Age of Ultron	75% (371 reviews)	66 (49 reviews)	A	90%
Ant-Man	83% (338 reviews)	64 (44 reviews)	A	—N/a
Phase Three
Captain America: Civil War	90% (430 reviews)	75 (52 reviews)	A	88%
Doctor Strange	89% (385 reviews)	72 (49 reviews)	A	91%
Guardians of the Galaxy Vol. 2	85% (422 reviews)	67 (47 reviews)	A	93%
Spider-Man: Homecoming	92% (396 reviews)	73 (51 reviews)	A	89%
Thor: Ragnarok	93% (437 reviews)	74 (51 reviews)	A	90%
Black Panther	96% (526 reviews)	88 (55 reviews)	A+	95%
Avengers: Infinity War	85% (486 reviews)	68 (54 reviews)	A	87%
Ant-Man and the Wasp	87% (445 reviews)	70 (56 reviews)	A−	—N/a
Captain Marvel	79% (545 reviews)	64 (56 reviews)	A	—N/a
Avengers: Endgame	94% (551 reviews)	78 (57 reviews)	A+	—N/a
Spider-Man: Far From Home	91% (454 reviews)	69 (55 reviews)	A	—N/a
Phase Four
Black Widow	79% (463 reviews)	68 (58 reviews)	A−	88%
Shang-Chi and the Legend of the Ten Rings	92% (344 reviews)	71 (52 reviews)	A	91%
Eternals	48% (416 reviews)	52 (62 reviews)	B	78%
Spider-Man: No Way Home	93% (429 reviews)	71 (60 reviews)	A+	96%
Doctor Strange in the Multiverse of Madness	73% (464 reviews)	60 (65 reviews)	B+	82%
Thor: Love and Thunder	64% (448 reviews)	57 (64 reviews)	B+	77%
Black Panther: Wakanda Forever	84% (450 reviews)	67 (62 reviews)	A	93%
Phase Five
Ant-Man and the Wasp: Quantumania	46% (414 reviews)	48 (61 reviews)	B	75%
Guardians of the Galaxy Vol. 3	82% (409 reviews)	64 (63 reviews)	A	91%
The Marvels	63% (377 reviews)	50 (57 reviews)	B	73%
Deadpool & Wolverine	77% (421 reviews)	56 (58 reviews)	A	96%
Captain America: Brave New World	46% (368 reviews)	42 (56 reviews)	B–	—N/a
Thunderbolts*	88% (382 reviews)	68 (53 reviews)	A–	—N/a
Phase Six
The Fantastic Four: First Steps	86% (408 reviews)	65 (54 reviews)	A–	86%
Spider-Man: Brand New Day	90% (439 reviews)	66 (56 reviews)	A	—N/a

=== Accolades ===
The films of the Marvel Cinematic Universe have been nominated for numerous awards, including 27 Academy Awards (winning four).

== Repurposed and abandoned projects ==
The following projects were in development as films from Marvel Studios before becoming television series under Marvel Television:

- Runaways: A film based on the Runaways went through a number of iterations. Brian K. Vaughan was originally hired to write a screenplay based on the property in May 2008. Feige and Marvel Studios producer Jodi Hildebrand envisioned the film as a coming-of-age story in the style of director John Hughes. In April 2010, Marvel hired Peter Sollett to direct the film, and Drew Pearce was hired to write a script in May. The film was developed under the working title Small Faces, referencing the 1960s rock band Small Faces. In October 2010, development on the film was put on hold, with Vaughan later noting Marvel Studios had decided to focus their efforts on a Guardians of the Galaxy film instead. Pearce revealed in September 2013 that the Runaways film had been shelved in favor of The Avengers, with the earliest it could release being Phase Three. Speaking in the book MCU: The Reign of Marvel Studios (2023), producer Craig Kyle noted that the film had been shelved because the New York-based Creative Committee did not believe the film's character make up fit their ideal demographic of what would help sell toys. In October 2014, after announcing all of Marvel's Phase Three films without Runaways, Feige stated the project was "still an awesome script that exists in our script vault", adding, "We'd love to do something with Runaways some day. In our television and future film discussions, it's always one that we talk about, because we have a solid draft there. But again, we can't make them all." In August 2016, Marvel Television announced Marvel's Runaways from the streaming service Hulu, with the series receiving a full season order in May 2017. It premiered in November 2017. Hulu announced in November 2019 that the third season of Runaways would be its last.
- Inhumans: In April 2013, Feige mentioned the Inhumans as a property out of which he was "confident" a film would be made. Inhumans as a concept would first be introduced to the MCU in 2014 through the second season of the television series Agents of S.H.I.E.L.D. By August 2014, the studio was ready to move forward in development with the film, with a screenplay written by Joe Robert Cole. In October 2014, the film was announced for Phase Three and scheduled for release in July 2019. By October 2015, Cole was no longer involved with the film and any potential drafts that he may have written would not be used. In April 2016, Inhumans was removed from the release schedule, and would no longer be a part of Phase Three. In July 2016, Feige said Inhumans would "certainly" be a part of the discussion regarding the film ideas for 2020 and 2021, adding the following November that he was still optimistic the film could be released in Phase Four. In November 2016, Marvel Television announced the series Marvel's Inhumans, which premiered on ABC in September 2017, after the first two episodes were screened in IMAX. The series was not intended to be a reworking of the film. ABC canceled Inhumans after one season in May 2018.

Additionally, this film was in development from Marvel Studios but has since been canceled:

- Blade: Following New Line Cinema's Blade film trilogy (1998–2004), Marvel Studios regained the film rights to the character Blade by July 2011 and was developing a new version by May 2013. Mahershala Ali, who played Cornell "Cottonmouth" Stokes in Marvel Television's Luke Cage (2016–18), approached Marvel Studios in February 2019 about starring in a new Blade film, which Feige announced as Blade at SDCC in July, with Ali as Blade; he first had an uncredited voice-only cameo in the film Eternals (2021). Multiple filmmakers were attached in the following years—including directors Bassam Tariq and Yann Demange, and writers Stacy Osei-Kuffour, Beau DeMayo, Michael Starrbury, Nic Pizzolatto, Michael Green, and Eric Pearson—while the production experienced several delays. Blade was removed from the release schedule in October 2024, but remained in development. By July 2026, Ali had moved on from the role and it was believed to have been canceled.

== Connections with other Spider-Man franchises ==
Following Marvel Studios and Sony Pictures' September 2019 agreement, Feige noted that as Sony continued to separately build their own shared universe, Sony's Spider-Man Universe (SSU), it was possible the MCU version of Spider-Man could appear in that universe. This interaction was said to be "a 'call and answer' between the two franchises as they acknowledge details between the two in what ... would loosely be described as a shared detailed universe". In May 2021, Adam B. Vary of Variety called the connections between the two universes perplexing, specifically because if Holland were to appear in an SSU film it would retroactively make any previous SSU films part of the MCU, and because a teaser trailer for the SSU film Morbius (2022) had featured Michael Keaton, who previously played Adrian Toomes / Vulture in Spider-Man: Homecoming. Sony Pictures Group President Sanford Panitch acknowledged this confusion and said there was a plan to clarify the relationship between the two universes. He believed it was already "getting a little more clear for people [as to] where we're headed" at that time and added that the release of Spider-Man: No Way Home in December 2021 would reveal more of this plan. Vary commented that the apparent introduction of multiverse elements in No Way Home could be what would allow Holland to appear in both the MCU and the SSU. The following month, Feige said he would not "rule anything out completely" in terms of additional Sony-controlled characters appearing in Marvel Studios films.

In No Way Home, Stephen Strange casts two spells: one that brings characters from other universes into the MCU and one that sends them back to their own universes. These characters, as depicted in the film, are Tobey Maguire and Andrew Garfield returning as their versions of Spider-Man from Sam Raimi's Spider-Man trilogy and Marc Webb's The Amazing Spider-Man films, respectively, alongside Willem Dafoe as Norman Osborn / Green Goblin, Alfred Molina as Otto Octavius / Doctor Octopus, and Thomas Haden Church as Flint Marko / Sandman from the Raimi films, as well as Rhys Ifans as Curt Connors / Lizard and Jamie Foxx as Max Dillon / Electro from the Webb films. The mid-credits scene of the SSU film Venom: Let There Be Carnage (2021) shows Eddie Brock and Venom (Tom Hardy) being transported into the MCU from their universe by the first spell and the mid-credits scene of No Way Home shows them being transported back to their own universe by the second spell. A small part of the Venom symbiote is left in the MCU. Feige said there was a lot of coordination between the Let There Be Carnage and No Way Home teams to create the two scenes, with No Way Home director Jon Watts directing both scenes during production of that film. The mid-credits scenes of Morbius revealed that Toomes was accidentally transported from the MCU to the SSU following Strange's second spell. The events of No Way Home are referenced in the animated film Spider-Man: Across the Spider-Verse (2023), which refers to the MCU as "Earth-199999", its designation in the Marvel Comics multiverse. In March 2025, Hardy said a crossover between his Venom and Holland's Spider-Man had been discussed beyond his appearance in No Way Home, but this did not eventuate and was never in development as a film. Holland echoed Hardy's comments in July 2026, saying there had been plans to merge the SSU with the MCU, but Sony never found the proper time to attempt that. Holland added that Sony Pictures chairman Tom Rothman saw the success of the MCU films and decided for Marvel Studios to "continue on our path" with the character.

In July 2025, Feige said Sony had told Marvel Studios to "stay away" from Miles Morales, the main character of the animated Spider-Verse film series, until Sony had finished making those films.

== See also ==
- List of Marvel Cinematic Universe television series (Marvel Television)
- List of Marvel Cinematic Universe television series (Marvel Studios)
- List of films based on Marvel Comics publications
- List of highest-grossing media franchises
