= Eternals (film) =

2021 Marvel Studios film

- Theatrical release poster
- Directed by: Chloé Zhao
- Screenplay by: Chloé Zhao (Note: Zhao is credited both as a solo writer and as part of a writing team with Burleigh.); Patrick Burleigh; Ryan Firpo; Kaz Firpo
- Story by: Ryan Firpo; Kaz Firpo
- Based on: Eternals by Jack Kirby
- Produced by: Kevin Feige; Nate Moore
- Starring: Gemma Chan; Richard Madden; Kumail Nanjiani; Lia McHugh; Brian Tyree Henry; Lauren Ridloff; Barry Keoghan; Don Lee; Kit Harington; Salma Hayek; Angelina Jolie
- Cinematography: Ben Davis
- Edited by: Craig Wood; Dylan Tichenor
- Music by: Ramin Djawadi
- Production company: Marvel Studios
- Distributed by: Walt Disney Studios Motion Pictures
- Release dates: October 18, 2021 (Dolby Theatre); November 5, 2021 (United States)
- Running time: 156 minutes
- Country: United States
- Language: English
- Budget: $292.2 million (gross); $253.6 million (net)
- Box office: $402.1 million

Eternals is a 2021 American superhero film based on the Marvel Comics race the Eternals. Produced by Marvel Studios and distributed by Walt Disney Studios Motion Pictures, it is the 26th film in the Marvel Cinematic Universe (MCU). The film was directed by Chloé Zhao, who wrote the screenplay with Patrick Burleigh, Ryan Firpo, and Kaz Firpo. It stars an ensemble cast including Gemma Chan, Richard Madden, Kumail Nanjiani, Lia McHugh, Brian Tyree Henry, Lauren Ridloff, Barry Keoghan, Don Lee, Kit Harington, Salma Hayek, and Angelina Jolie. In the film, the Eternals are immortal beings who emerge from hiding after thousands of years to protect Earth from their ancient counterparts, the Deviants.

In April 2018, Marvel Studios president Kevin Feige announced that a film based on the Eternals was in development and would explore the group as ancient aliens living throughout human history. Ryan and Kaz Firpo were hired to write the script, and Zhao was set to direct in September. She was given significant creative freedom to rewrite the script, taking particular inspiration from Terrence Malick's films, and to use more locations and natural lighting than previous MCU films had. Casting began in early 2019 and Burleigh joined to work on the script ahead of principal photography, which took place from July 2019 to February 2020 at Pinewood Studios and on location in England and the Canary Islands.

Eternals premiered at the Dolby Theatre in Los Angeles on October 18, 2021, and was released in the United States on November 5 as part of Phase Four of the MCU. It grossed $402.1 million worldwide and received several awards and nominations, but it also became the first MCU film to not receive generally positive reviews. Particular criticism went to the screenplay and pacing, with commentators feeling it did not live up to Zhao's previous work or to previous MCU films. The themes and visuals received some praise.

== Plot ==
In 5000 BC, ten superpowered beings known as Eternals—Ajak, Sersi, Ikaris, Kingo, Sprite, Phastos, Makkari, Druig, Gilgamesh, and Thena—are sent to Earth by Arishem, a Celestial, on the starship Domo. They are charged with exterminating invasive entities known as the Deviants. After the last Deviants are killed in 1521, the group's opinions differ over their continued relationship with humankind. Over the next 500 years, they mostly live apart, waiting for Arishem's orders.

In the present, Sersi and Sprite live together in London. After Sersi's partner Ikaris left her without explanation centuries earlier, she is now in a relationship with human Dane Whitman who works at the Natural History Museum. When the trio is attacked by the Deviant Kro, Ikaris arrives and chases the creature away. The three Eternals travel to South Dakota to reunite with their leader, Ajak, only to find her dead. Sersi is posthumously chosen by Ajak as her successor, granting her the ability to communicate with Arishem.

Sersi learns that the Eternals' mission was actually to prepare Earth for the Emergence of a new Celestial. Arishem explains that, for millions of years, he has been planting Celestial seeds inside planets where the energy from large populations allows new Celestials to be born. The Deviants were sent to destroy the apex predators of each planet to ensure the development of intelligent life, but when they evolved and began hunting the planets' native populations, Arishem created the Eternals to counter them. With the recent end of the Blip restoring Earth's population, (Note: As depicted in Avengers: Endgame (2019)) humankind has reached the necessary size to allow the Celestial Tiamut to be born, which will result in Earth's destruction.

Hoping to delay the Emergence, the Eternals reunite. At Druig's residence in the Amazon rainforest, they are attacked by the Deviants. They kill them all except for Kro, who kills Gilgamesh before fleeing. Phastos proposes they use the Uni-Mind, a connection between all the Eternals that would give Druig enough power to put Tiamut to sleep with his mind-control abilities. However, Ikaris is loyal to Arishem and refuses to help stop the Emergence. He reveals that Ajak wanted to stop the Emergence and save humanity, so he led her to the Deviants and allowed them to kill her. Sprite joins Ikaris due to her unrequited love for him while Kingo chooses to leave, agreeing with Ikaris but not wanting to hurt his friends.

Makkari locates the site of the Emergence, an active volcano in the Indian Ocean, where Ikaris and Sprite attempt to stop them. Druig knocks out Sprite, and Phastos restrains Ikaris. Kro arrives and is killed by Thena. Druig is unable to put Tiamut to sleep, and Sersi instead attempts to turn him into stone. Ikaris breaks free of his restraints and goes to kill Sersi, but is unable to due to his love for her. Both he and Sprite join with the others in the Uni-Mind, and Sersi gains enough power to turn Tiamut into stone. Guilt-ridden, Ikaris flies into the Sun. Sersi uses the remaining Uni-Mind energy to turn Sprite into a human, ending her permanent childlike state.

Thena, Druig, and Makkari depart on the Domo to warn Eternals on other planets of the Emergences. Whitman professes his love for Sersi and is about to reveal a secret about his family history when she, Phastos, and Kingo are lifted into space by Arishem. Displeased with their treason, Arishem says he will spare humanity if the Eternals' memories show that humans are worthy of living. He vows to return for judgment and takes the trio into a singularity.

In a mid-credits scene, Thena, Makkari, and Druig meet the Eternal Eros and his assistant Pip the Troll. In a post-credits scene, an unseen person (Note: Identified off-screen as Blade) questions whether Whitman is ready to wield the Ebony Blade.

== Cast ==
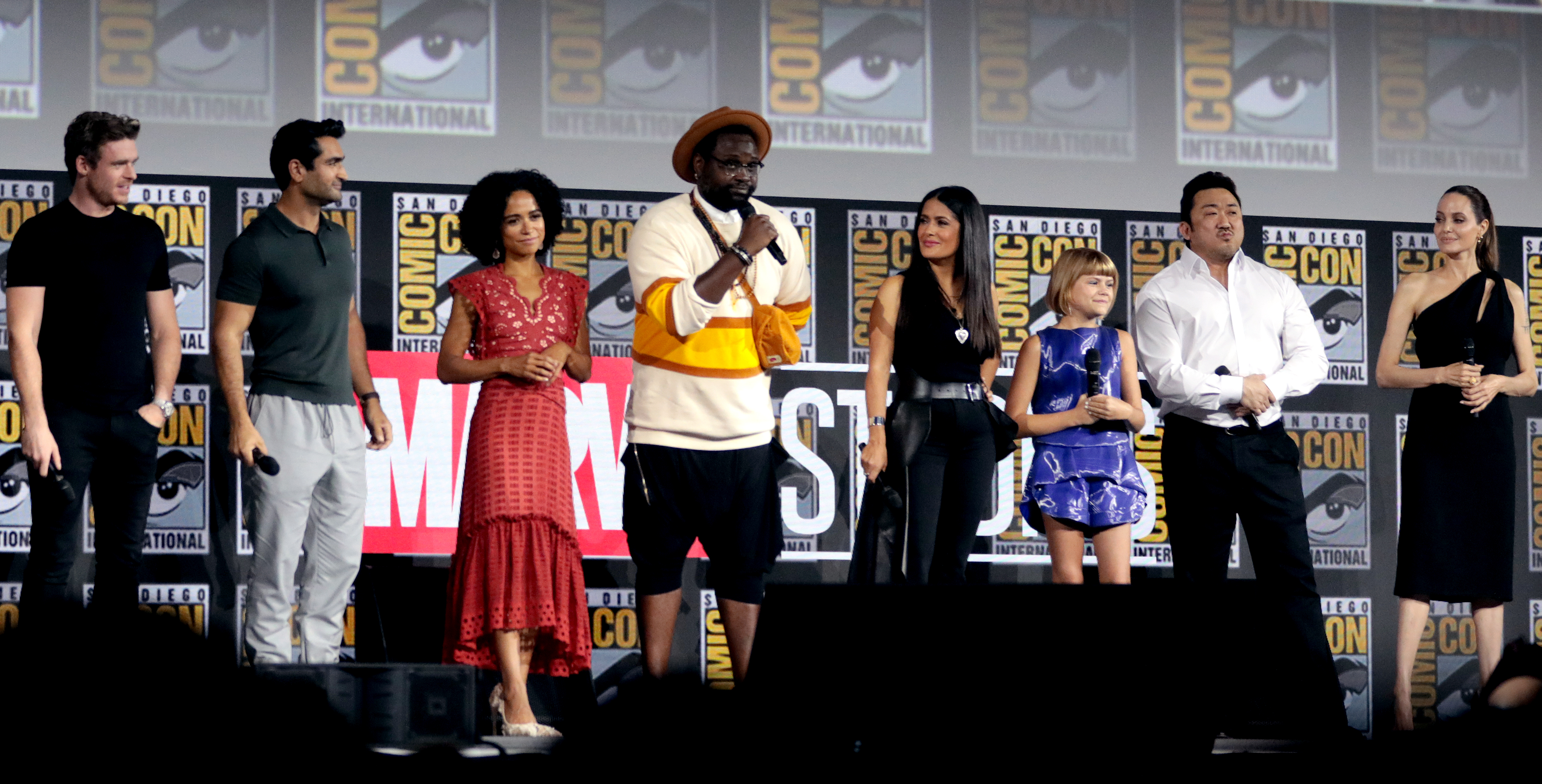
The cast of Eternals at the 2019 San Diego Comic-Con (L to R): Madden, Nanjiani, Ridloff, Henry, Hayek, McHugh, Lee, and Jolie

- Gemma Chan as Sersi:
  An empathetic Eternal with a strong connection to humanity and the Earth, who can manipulate and transform matter through physical contact. Sersi has been in love with Ikaris for centuries and has a strong connection with Sprite. In the present day, she is a museum curator on Earth and dating Dane Whitman. Producer Kevin Feige said Sersi was the lead character of the film. Director Chloé Zhao said she and Chan were interested in creating the kind of nuanced female superhero that they felt was rarely seen in the genre, and Zhao felt Chan had imbued the character with gentleness, compassion, and vulnerability that would "invite viewers to rethink what it means to be heroic". Chan said Sersi was free-spirited and loved being around humans.
- Richard Madden as Ikaris:
  A powerful Eternal who can fly and project cosmic energy beams from his eyes. Speaking to the relationship between Ikaris and Sersi, Madden said the fact that they had loved each other for centuries showed a "deep level of romance" between the two. They are on opposing sides of how the Eternals connect to the world, with Sersi having compassion for humans while Ikaris is more disconnected. The biggest struggle for Madden was showing that Ikaris has "seen everything and done everything" without the character coming across as bored. Zhao's take on Ikaris was influenced by director Zack Snyder's interpretation of Superman in Man of Steel (2013) which left a strong impression on her for its "authentic and very real" approach.
- Kumail Nanjiani as Kingo:
  An Eternal who can create cosmic energy projectiles. Enamored with fame, Kingo becomes a popular Bollywood film star to blend in on Earth. Nanjiani wanted to combine the wisecracking attitude of John McClane from the Die Hard film series with the look of Bollywood actor Hrithik Roshan. He studied Errol Flynn films and some of the original Zorro films to emulate "old school Hollywood stars whose characters really enjoyed fighting". Nanjiani, who is not a dancer, grew up watching Bollywood dances and spent several months training for the film's own such sequence in hopes of capturing the same energy and joy. He underwent rigorous fitness training to build muscle for the role, despite Marvel Studios being happy for him to look "normal", because Nanjiani saw an opportunity to create a South Asian superhero with a comparable physique to Superman and Thor. Nanjiani signed a contract to appear in six films, a video game, and a theme park ride.
- Lia McHugh as Sprite:
  An Eternal who can project life-like illusions. Sprite is in a permanent childlike state, appearing as a young girl despite being thousands of years old. The film explores her struggles with this, including her jealousy of humans who can grow old, know love, and have families. She has an unrequited love for Ikaris which Kingo compares to that of Tinker Bell for Peter Pan. Similarly, Neil Gaiman and John Romita Jr.'s 2006 Eternals comic book miniseries compared Sprite to the never-aging Peter Pan and gave them similar short, red hair, which the film also uses. The film ends with Sprite becoming human and being able to grow old.
- Brian Tyree Henry as Phastos: An Eternal and an intelligent weapons and technology inventor. He is the first superhero to be depicted as gay in an MCU film.
- Lauren Ridloff as Makkari:
  An Eternal who can move at superhuman speed. The character is the first deaf superhero in the MCU. After starting to run more in anticipation of the role, Ridloff shifted to muscle building to have "the symmetry of somebody who looks like a sprinter".
- Barry Keoghan as Druig: An aloof Eternal who becomes frustrated with the inaction of the other Eternals in human affairs. He can manipulate the minds of others.
- Don Lee as Gilgamesh:
  The strongest Eternal, with a deep connection to Thena. Lee pursued the role to be an inspiration to the younger generation as the first Korean superhero, and was able to use his boxing training for the role.
- Kit Harington as Dane Whitman: A human who works at the Natural History Museum in London as a history professor and is dating Sersi.
- Salma Hayek as Ajak:
  The wise and spiritual leader of the Eternals, who has the ability to heal and is the "bridge" between the Eternals and the Celestials. Changing the character from a man in the comics allowed Hayek to lean into Ajak's femininity and make her the "mother figure" of the Eternals. Hayek was initially hesitant to work with Marvel, assuming she would have a supporting or "grandmother" role.
- Angelina Jolie as Thena:
  An elite warrior Eternal who can form any weapon out of cosmic energy and develops a close bond with Gilgamesh over the centuries. She also suffers from a psychological condition called Mahd Wy'ry. Jolie trained with various swords, spears, and staffs for the role, as well as taking ballet.

Additionally, Bill Skarsgård voices Kro, one of the Deviants, and David Kaye voices the Celestial Arishem. Harish Patel appears as Karun Patel, Kingo's human valet; Haaz Sleiman and Esai Daniel Cross portray Phastos's husband Ben and son Jack, respectively; and Zain Al Rafeea plays a villager in 5000 BC. In the mid-credits scene, Harry Styles appears as Eros / Starfox, the brother of MCU character Thanos, while Patton Oswalt voices Eros's assistant Pip the Troll. In the post-credits scene, Mahershala Ali is introduced as Blade in an uncredited voice-only cameo; he was cast to star as the character in a since-canceled film.

== Production ==
=== Development ===
In April 2015, Marvel Television was working with screenwriter John Ridley to craft a new television series for ABC, "reinventing" an existing Marvel Comics character or property. This was revealed years later to be the Eternals, a race of long-lived superheroes created by Jack Kirby. Ridley said he was trying to make a superhero series that viewers had not seen before, differentiating it from Marvel's other projects, and said his approach would have been a "really weird story" that may not have been entertaining for everyone. It ultimately did not move forward with Ridley, and Marvel Television was folded into Marvel Studios in December 2019.

Marvel Studios president Kevin Feige said in April 2018 that the studio was actively developing a film based on the Eternals, to be released as part of their Marvel Cinematic Universe (MCU) Phase Four slate of films. Marvel Studios had met with multiple screenwriters and was believed to be focusing on the character Sersi in the film. Marvel set Ryan and Kaz Firpo to write the script a month later, with their outline including a love story between the characters Sersi and Ikaris. The Firpos said the 1999 limited comic book series Earth X by Jim Krueger and John Paul Leon, which is about a dystopian version of the Marvel Universe, was a major inspiration for them. In June, Feige said Marvel was interested in exploring the "ancient aliens kind of sci-fi trope" by having the Eternals be the inspiration for myths and legends throughout the history of the MCU.

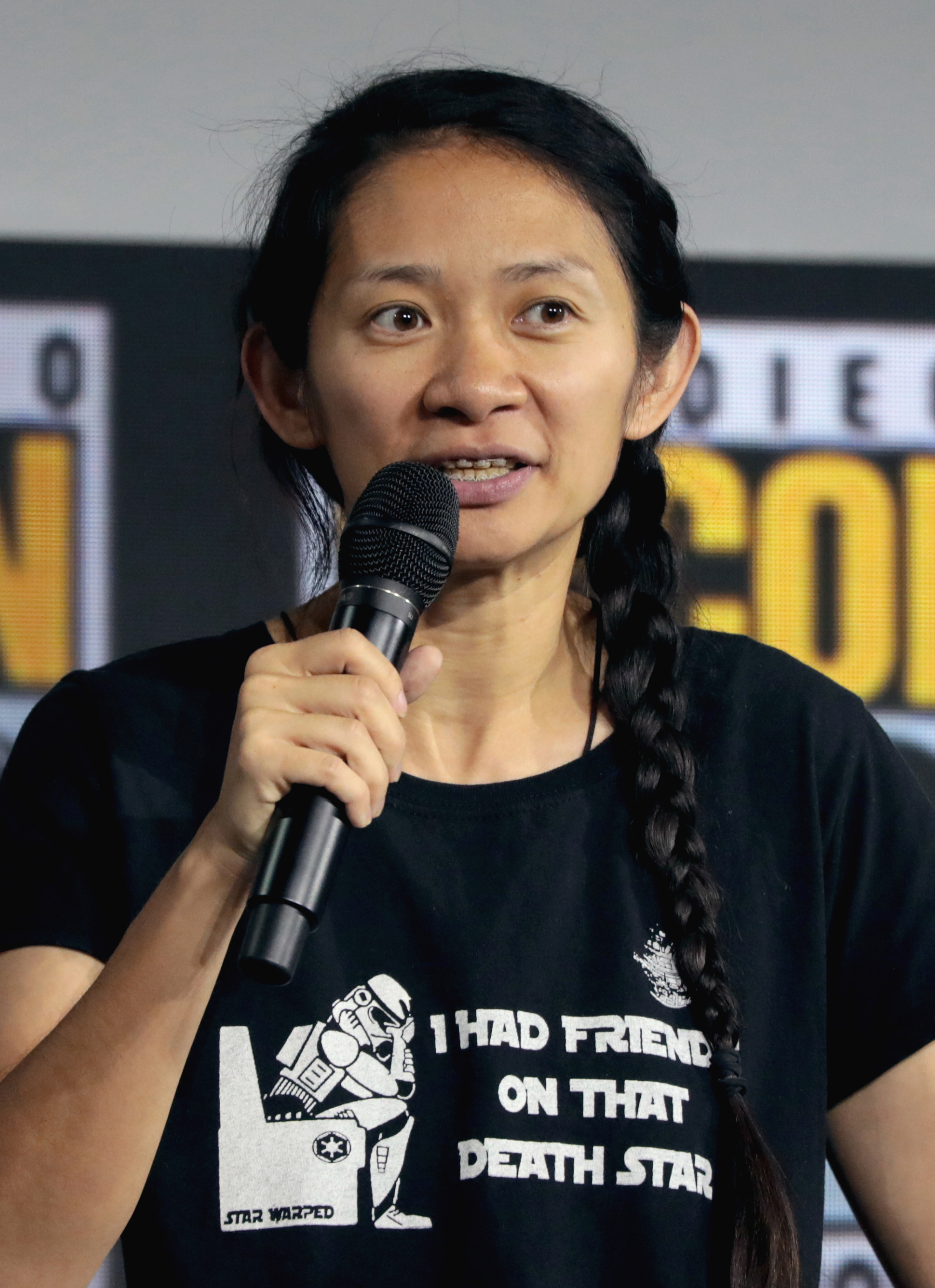
Director Chloé Zhao promoting Eternals at the 2019 San Diego Comic-Con

During late August, Marvel's director search for Eternals narrowed to a shortlist that included Chloé Zhao—who had also been in the running to direct Marvel's Black Widow (2021)—Nicole Kassell, Travis Knight, and the pair of Cristina Gallego and Ciro Guerra. Zhao approached Marvel Studios about making the film as she had been a fan of the MCU. She wanted to work with the studio to bring her own take and world-building to the franchise, and impressed them with a presentation that Feige described as fascinating, with "reams of visuals". Feige was also impressed with Zhao's passion for the project, since it was not a top priority for the studio. Zhao worked with producer Nate Moore to develop her pitch, noting she became interested in the project after reading its treatment that read like a Greek play "where gods get to discuss everything about human nature based on their own relationship". The presentation left Marvel concerned that she might take on a different big-studio project instead of Eternals, forcing them to move quickly to secure her, and Zhao was hired as director in September. This was ahead of her beginning production on her film Nomadland (2020), with Zhao beginning to work on the Eternals script during the filming of Nomadland. Zhao hoped to push the scope of the film further than Marvel's Avengers: Endgame (2019), but also wanted it to have intimacy. Zhao described the film as a melting pot of influences, taking from Kirby's original Eternals comics, Neil Gaiman's 2006 comic book run, previous MCU projects, and Zhao's love of science fiction and fantasy films and manga. Speaking specifically to her love of manga, she hoped those influences would create a "marriage of East and West". Zhao cited the television series Ancient Aliens (2009–present), the Final Fantasy video game franchise, concepts from Yuval Noah Harari's book Sapiens: A Brief History of Humankind (2011), and the films of Terrence Malick as inspirations.

Marvel saw Eternals as an opportunity to create an ensemble film that is not a crossover, similar to Guardians of the Galaxy (2014), and to introduce relatively unknown characters to audiences as they did with the Guardians and the Avengers. The studio also considered Eternals to be a perfect transition into its next phase of films along with projects such as Captain Marvel (2019), allowing them to cast a diverse group of actors to portray the various Eternals. Moore's initial planning documents for the project included the swapping of genders, sexualities, and ethnicities of some characters, and Zhao further advocated for this approach. In February 2019, Feige reiterated that Marvel was interested in the Eternals due to Kirby's epic, century-spanning story, with the film version covering 7,000 years and exploring humanity's place in the cosmos. Zhao said the Eternals "have lived among us for so long, [they have] the same struggles like identity, purpose, faith, personal freedom versus greater good—all the duality and flaws that make us human". With a story that spans so many years, the characters' relationships evolve like a complex family unit where friends "turn into frenemies, and then turn into enemies, and then come back to friendship". Zhao considered the Earth to be an eleventh character in the film.

=== Pre-production ===
Zhao continued working on a draft of the script throughout early 2019, which built upon the multiple drafts submitted by the Firpos. Approximately four months ahead of filming, the script was not finalized. Moore introduced Zhao to Patrick Burleigh, who had been part of Marvel's writers program, in the hopes that Burleigh could assist with the writing. Zhao hired him to work on the screenplay, which he did for about three months ahead of filming. Burleigh believed Zhao needed to write on the film as well as direct to "process the film through her own filter", and said her draft showed that she was "trying to make the Terrence Malick version of a Marvel film"; Zhao cited Malick's film The Tree of Life (2011) as a particular inspiration. Burleigh said his work on the script was mostly "structural" to find "the flow of the film", and likened the story to a road trip film.

"I wanted it to reflect the world we live in. But also I wanted to put a cast together that feels like a group of misfits. I didn't want the jocks. I want you to walk away at the end of the movie not thinking, 'This person is this ethnicity, that person is that nationality.' No. I want you to walk away thinking, 'That's a family.' You don't think about what they represent."

— Zhao on the diverse cast of the film

Angelina Jolie joined the cast in March 2019, reportedly as Sersi, with Kumail Nanjiani and Don Lee cast in undisclosed roles the next month. At that time, the film was expected to feature Marvel Studios' first gay superhero. In May, Richard Madden entered negotiations for the role of Ikaris, and Salma Hayek had entered early negotiations for an undisclosed role the following month. In July, Variety reported that the cast included Jolie, Madden, and Millie Bobby Brown, but Brown denied that she had been cast.

At the 2019 San Diego Comic-Con, Feige officially announced The Eternals with a release date of November 6, 2020. He officially announced the casting of Jolie as Thena, Nanjiani as Kingo, Lee as Gilgamesh, Madden as Ikaris, and Hayek as Ajak, along with Lauren Ridloff as Makkari, Brian Tyree Henry as Phastos, and Lia McHugh as Sprite. Zhao looked for actors for each role that could "find a bit of themselves in their character". Feige added that one of these actors was portraying an LGBTQ character, with actor Haaz Sleiman later revealing that Phastos is depicted as gay in the film. Sleiman portrays the character's husband, and the pair have a child in the film. Sleiman felt it was important to depict "how loving and beautiful a queer family can be" rather than the "sexual or rebellious" depiction in some previous media. Feige said the relationship was "always sort of inherent in the story" and he felt it was "extremely well done" in the film, while Sleiman said it was a "thoughtful" depiction.

Eternals is set around eight months after the events of Avengers: Endgame, and addresses why the Eternals did not interfere in any previous conflicts in the MCU. Both Feige and Moore said the film would have "major ripple effects" on the future of the MCU, and at times, it was "a challenge" to balance the grounded nature of the MCU with the "mythic grandeur" of the Eternals property.

=== Filming ===
By the time of the film's official announcement in July 2019, principal photography had begun at Pinewood Studios in Buckinghamshire, England. Ben Davis served as director of photography, after doing so on several previous MCU films. Zhao said Marvel Studios allowed her creative freedom to shoot the film on location, "exactly the way [she] wanted to shoot" it. She was able to use a similar style to her previous films, including 360° shots and working with the same camera and rigs as were used for her film Nomadland (2020), which Zhao was set to complete back-to-back with Eternals. Zhao felt that she "got lucky in that Marvel wants to take risks and do something different". Zhao cited The Revenant (2015) as a primary influence when composing the film's action sequences.

Gemma Chan and Barry Keoghan were in talks to join the cast in August 2019. Chan previously portrayed Minn-Erva in Captain Marvel, but reports noted that she was potentially being looked at by Marvel to play a separate character in this film. Since Minn-Erva dies in that film, Chan had felt that it was unlikely she would return to the MCU, but after working on the film she was told by Feige that the studio wanted to "make better use" of her in a future project. This led to Chan auditioning for Sersi, one of the last actresses to be considered for the role. Chan later described Sersi as the most difficult role for the film to cast. Chan and Keoghan were confirmed to be cast in the film at the D23 Expo in August, in the roles of Sersi and Druig, respectively, along with Kit Harington as Dane Whitman. Chan said she and Marvel Studios were surprised by how soon after Captain Marvel her new MCU role came, with both assuming that it would have been a project further in the future. Harish Patel was cast at the end of August as Karun, Kingo's manager, and filmed his role from September 2019 until January 2020.

By early November, filming had taken place in the Canary Islands. The cast and crew, including Jolie and Madden, had to be evacuated from a shooting location on the island of Fuerteventura when an explosive device, thought to be a remnant armament from a Nazi base, was found there. Later that month, Zain Al Rafeea joined the cast. In early January 2020, filming took place outside the Oxford University Museum of Natural History in Oxford, England, as well as Hampstead Heath and in Camden in London, under the working title Sack Lunch. Chan said the filming process felt very different from what she experienced on Captain Marvel, explaining that Eternals shot more on location and used natural light while Captain Marvel had more studio work and bluescreens. Filming wrapped on February 4, 2020.

=== Post-production ===
In March 2020, Scanline VFX, one of the companies working on the film's visual effects, confirmed that they would be working remotely due to the COVID-19 pandemic. Industrial Light & Magic, Luma Pictures, RISE, and Weta Digital also worked on the film's visual effects. In early April, Disney shifted much of their Phase Four slate of films due to the pandemic, moving The Eternals' release date to February 12, 2021. In August, the film's title was officially shortened from The Eternals to Eternals, and the next month, the release date was pushed back to November 5, 2021. Reshoots had taken place by mid-November 2020.

Additional filming occurred in Los Angeles in early February, also under the working title Sack Lunch. Dylan Tichenor and Craig Wood serve as co-editors of the film. Tichenor said Zhao usually edits her own films and has "strong opinions", but on Eternals she was relying on Tichenor and Wood due to the size of the production and the ongoing awards season for Nomadland. Tichenor added that Zhao respected the pair's editing experience and point of view, and they made their first cut of the film without much input from her. They began adjusting the film based on Zhao's feedback and were still working on the editing in April 2021. At the end of the month, Zhao said editing for the film was in its "final stretch", and Jashaun St. John was revealed to appear in the film, after previously starring in Zhao's film Songs My Brothers Taught Me (2015).

At the end of May 2021, with the release of the first teaser trailer and poster for the film, the official writing credits were revealed: Zhao was credited as the screenwriter, both as a solo contributor and as part of a writing team with Burleigh, while Ryan and Kaz Firpo received story credit. Additionally, Gil Birmingham was revealed to have been cast in the film, although he was absent in the final film. In July 2021, Writers Guild of America West presented the film's final writing credits, awarding Ryan and Kaz Firpo screenplay credit along with Zhao and the team of Zhao and Burleigh, in addition to their story credit. Moore believed the studio had "bit off as much as we could chew" with the film, creating one that "felt urgent and present and had [a fast] pace, but also took time to reflect back over the centuries".

At the film's world premiere, Matt Donnelly of Variety tweeted that Harry Styles made an appearance in a post-credits scene as Eros / Starfox, Thanos's brother in the comics, which was not shown in early press screenings of the film. Zhao later revealed that she "kept tabs on [Styles]" since his appearance in the film Dunkirk (2017), believing that he "makes me think of Eros as a character". WWE wrestler Becky Lynch had a role in the film for a planned post-credits scene that was intended to set up a future project. The scene was removed for being reportedly "too depressing".

== Music ==
Ramin Djawadi composed the score for the film, after previously doing so for Marvel's Iron Man (2008). Two songs from the film's soundtrack, "Across the Oceans of Time" and "Eternals Theme", were released as singles on October 22, 2021, while the full album was released on November 3.

== Marketing ==
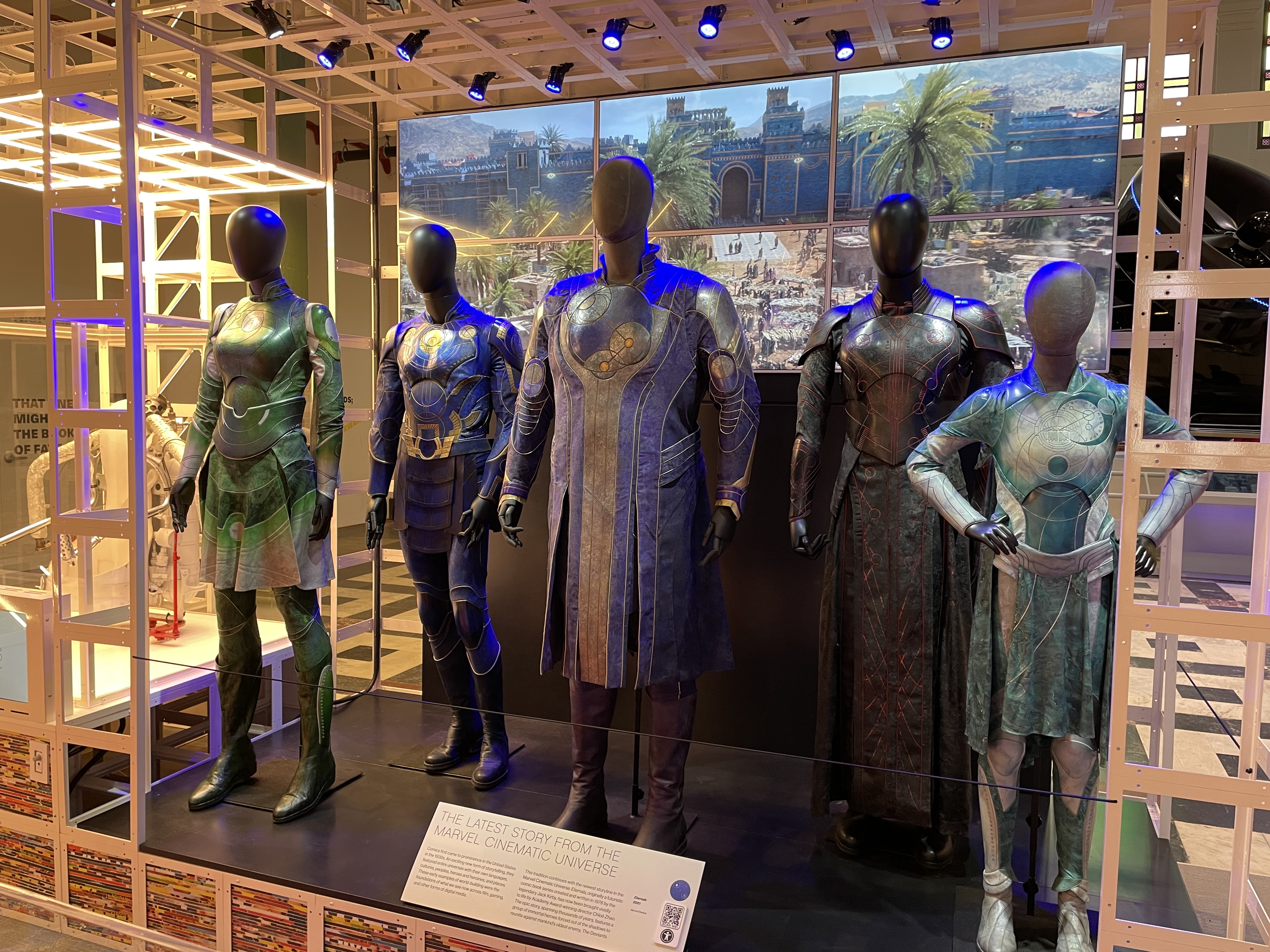
Select costumes from the film on display as part of the Futures exhibit at the Smithsonian Institution

The first footage of the film was released in May 2021, as part of a promotional video from Marvel Studios celebrating their films and a return to theaters in light of the COVID-19 pandemic. Though the footage was limited and "vague", Hoai-Tran Bui at /Film still felt it was "very exciting". Chaim Gartenberg of The Verge felt one of the biggest moments of the footage was seeing Jolie wielding a sword made of light. He was also encouraged that Eternals appeared to be one of Marvel's first films to "deliver on [their] years-long promise of creating films with more diverse casts". Nerdist's Michael Arbeiter said the footage was quick, but felt that it "manages an air of wonderment".

The first teaser for the film was released on May 24, 2021. Gartenberg felt the teaser was light on plot elements, with it instead focusing on the "civilization-spanning scope of the superhero team and its members throughout human history". He also believed the film was "a big swing" from Marvel Studios to entice audiences with a lesser-known comics property, but believed that it would succeed due to its diverse cast of well-known actors and Zhao's status as "one of the most exciting directors around". io9's Charlies Pulliam-Moore felt the trailer was a "multiple millennia-spanning recap of Earth's history", and said it was unclear how much the larger MCU would impact on the film outside of a brief reference to the Avengers at the end of the trailer. Writing for Entertainment Weekly, Nick Romano felt the teaser was a combination of "thrilling, goosebump-inducing moments" and some jokes. Erik Adams of The A.V. Club felt the spot teased some fresh angles for the MCU in a similar way to Thor: Ragnarok (2017) and Guardians of the Galaxy (2014), and he enjoyed the images of Kingo's Bollywood dance, Sprite performing karaoke, and the end scene of the Eternals eating together and joking about the Avengers. After seeing the teaser, Variety's Adam B. Vary described the film as "unquestionably a Chloé Zhao movie", but wished more action set pieces were featured in the teaser to see how Zhao would approach them in the film. Adele Ankers of IGN discussed the poster that was released at the same time as the trailer, highlighting how the Eternals appear in silhouette against a sunlit background which she described as "another taste of Chloé Zhao's signature filming style and the use of natural light to illuminate a frame" that would be seen in the film. Upon release, the teaser quickly became the number one trending video on YouTube and amassed 77 million global views in its first 24 hours. Disney's president of marketing Asad Ayaz said the teaser was designed to just be an introduction to the characters and tone and not give much of the film away, adding the marketing team would be "very judicious" on when more material would be revealed, while also using the releases of Black Widow and Shang-Chi and the Legend of the Ten Rings before Eternals to help expose audiences to the characters.

The final trailer was released in August 2021, with Ethan Shanfeld and Manori Ravindran of Variety feeling it was "more serious in tone" than the teaser with the Eternals "grappling with the prospect of emerging after centuries living apart in order to help humans". Entertainment Weekly's Devan Coggan felt that the trailer was the "best glimpse yet" of the film and gave a "sense of the vast scale and scope of the film", while answering "one important question" about the absence of the Eternals during the conflict against Thanos in Avengers: Infinity War and Avengers: Endgame. Aaron Couch at The Hollywood Reporter said the trailer "reveals much of [the film's] plot as well as its characters' powers, teasing the answers to key questions about who the Eternals answer to, their relationship to Earth and why they ultimately didn't intervene" in the conflict against Thanos.

In October 2021, Lexus released a commercial promoting the film and its Lexus IS 500 sports sedan starring Nanjiani as Kingo, with frequent MCU directors Joe and Anthony Russo guiding its development and Framestore working on the visual effects. Lexus created ten concept cars based on the ten Eternals characters from the film. The LS 500h and NX are featured in the film. Beginning on November 20, 2021, select costumes from the film were part of the Futures exhibit at the Smithsonian Institution's Arts and Industries Building, which ran through July 2022. Behind-the-scenes content looking at the evolution of the film's visuals as well as an augmented reality experience were also included in the exhibit.

== Release ==
=== Theatrical ===
Eternals had its world premiere at the Dolby Theatre in Hollywood, Los Angeles, on October 18, 2021, and was screened at the Rome Film Festival on October 24. The film was released theatrically in many European countries on November 3, and in the United States and the United Kingdom on November 5 in RealD 3D and 4DX. In September 2021, Disney announced that the film would have an exclusive theatrical release for a minimum of 45 days. Eternals was previously set for release on November 6, 2020, before it was shifted to February 12, 2021, and then to the November 2021 date, due to the COVID-19 pandemic. It is part of Phase Four of the MCU.

==== Censorship ====
In May 2021, a Chinese state media report excluded Eternals, as well as Shang-Chi and the Legend of the Ten Rings, from its list of upcoming MCU films releasing, which Variety noted "added to rumors" that the films would not be released in China, especially since Zhao had become "an unexpected persona non grata" in the country after she was scrutinized by Chinese netizens over her remarks in a 2013 interview with Filmmaker magazine in which she described China as "a place where there are lies everywhere". By September 2021, Deadline Hollywood reported it remained "an open question" if the Chinese government or Zhao would attempt to "rehabilitate" the situation, but it "seems likely" the film would not be released in China following the country's response to Nomadland as well as Shang-Chi and the Legend of the Ten Rings likely not being released in the country either following backlash to comments made by star Simu Liu in 2017.

The film was not released in Saudi Arabia, Kuwait, Qatar, Bahrain and Oman due to the depiction of a gay couple. Theaters in the United Arab Emirates, Jordan, Lebanon, and Egypt were set to show an edited version of the film which is missing all the love scenes. Angelina Jolie criticized the countries' decision to ban the film, saying: "I'm sad for [those audiences]. And I'm proud of Marvel for refusing to cut those scenes out. I still don't understand how we live in a world today where there's still [people who] would not see the family Phastos has and the beauty of that relationship and that love. How anybody is angry about it, threatened by it, doesn't approve or appreciate it is ignorant." Lebanese actor Haaz Sleiman, who played Phastos' husband Ben in the film, also voiced the same reaction towards the matter: "They stood their ground and said, 'Nope, we are not going to compromise the integrity of our film.' It made these Arab countries looks [sic] so ignorant and pathetic. I have no respect for those governments. They have displayed to the world that they are not only a disgrace to humanity, but to God. Hopefully this will inspire the Saudi people, the Kuwaiti people and the people in Qatar to fight back." Marvel later agreed to cut any kind of love scenes, including the gay couple kiss for the film's release in Indonesia, which received praise from the Indonesian Film Censorship Board (LSF).

=== Home media ===
Eternals began streaming on Disney+ on January 12, 2022, with the option to view the theatrical version of the film or an IMAX Enhanced version. Audio commentary and additional bonus features for the film were added to Disney+ in March 2022. It was released on Ultra HD Blu-ray, Blu-ray, and DVD on February 15. The home media includes audio commentary, deleted scenes, a gag reel, and various behind-the-scenes featurettes.

In the United States, Eternals debuted at No. 4 on iTunes in transactions, No. 5 on Google Play, and No. 3 on Vudu, which ranks titles by revenue, for the week of January 10–17. The film debuted at No. 1 on both the overall disc sales chart and the Blu-ray Disc chart for the week ending February 19. Blu-ray formats accounted for 67% of first-week sales, with 37% from standard Blu-ray and 30% from 4K Ultra HD editions. The film remained the No. 1 best-selling DVD and Blu-ray for the second consecutive week on both charts for the week ending February 26, while also debuting at No. 4 on the rental chart following a one-week delay in availability at Redbox kiosks. Blu-ray formats accounted for 67% of the film's first-week disc sales, with 37% from standard Blu-ray and 30% from 4K Ultra HD. For the month of April 2022, Eternals ranked No. 8 on the year-to-date disc sales chart, according to Circana.

Analytics company Samba TV, which gathers viewership data from certain smart TVs and content providers, reported that Eternals was watched by 2 million U.S. households during its first five days on Disney+. Whip Media, which tracks viewership data for the more than 25 million worldwide users of its TV Time app, calculated that it was the top streaming film for viewers in the U.S. for the week ending January 16. Nielsen Media Research, which records streaming viewership on certain U.S. television screens, announced that Eternals was streamed for 4.24 billion minutes in 2022, ranking as the thirteenth most-streamed film of the year. Eternals was the most-streamed Marvel film of 2022, making it both the first MCU and first superhero film to appear on the annual list.

== Reception ==
=== Box office ===
Eternals grossed $164.9 million in the United States and Canada, and $237.2 million in other territories, for a worldwide total of $402.1 million. The film's opening weekend earned $162 million globally, which was the second-largest worldwide opening weekend in the COVID-19 pandemic for a Hollywood film, of which IMAX contributed to over $13.6 million.

==== Pre-sale tickets and projections ====
Advanced ticket sales for Eternals were estimated to be $2.6 million in its first 24 hours, outpacing those for Shang-Chi and the Legend of the Ten Rings ($1.4 million) and Black Widow ($2 million) during the same time frame, while AMC Theatres had the largest first-day sales of 2021 for the film. In November, Fandango reported that pre-sales for Eternals were the second-largest of 2021, behind Black Widow. In October, Boxoffice Pro initially projected that the film would earn $82–102 million within its opening weekend, and around $210–280 million in total domestic box office. At the end of the month, Boxoffice Pro modified their projections to $67–92 million for the film's opening weekend, and around $165–215 million in total domestic box office, due to mixed early critical reception. According to Deadline Hollywood, Eternals was expected to earn $75 million within its domestic opening weekend, and around $150 million globally.

==== Performance ====
In the United States and Canada, Eternals earned $30.7 million on its opening day, which included $9.5 million from Thursday night previews, marking the third-largest opening day of the pandemic, behind Black Widow and Venom: Let There Be Carnage. Its opening weekend earned $71.3 million from 5.5 million theater admissions, making it the top film of the weekend. IMAX accounted for over $7.6 million over the weekend. This marked the fourth-largest opening weekend of the pandemic. The domestic opening weekend gross was lower than various pre-release projections. Deadline attributed this to the film's overall mixed reception from critics and audiences. In its second weekend, Eternals remained the top film, grossing over $27.5 million. Eternals became the sixth-highest-grossing film of 2021 in the United States.

Outside of the United States and Canada, Eternals earned over $90.7 million within its opening weekend from 46 markets. It was number one in nearly all of these markets. The international opening weekend gross had exceeded various pre-release projections. IMAX contributed to $6 million of the opening gross, from 58 countries. The film scored the largest opening of the pandemic in Italy, Brazil, and Hong Kong. In South Korea, Eternals earned $14.4 million, marking the largest debut for a Hollywood film amid the pandemic. In Russia, the film earned an opening of $5.4 million through six days. In its second weekend, Eternals earned $48 million from 49 markets, a drop of 49%. It remained number one in many of these territories. The following weekend, the film earned $22.7 million. It was the top film of the weekend internationally, remaining the top film in many territories, including all markets across Latin America, except for Mexico. As of November 28, 2021, the film's largest markets were South Korea ($26.4 million), the United Kingdom ($18.7 million), France ($14.9 million), Mexico ($14.3 million), and Brazil ($11.1 million).

=== Critical response ===
The review aggregator Rotten Tomatoes reports an approval rating of 48% based on 416 reviews, with an average rating of 5.7/10. The website's critical consensus reads, "An ambitious superhero epic that soars as often as it strains, Eternals takes the MCU in intriguing—and occasionally confounding—new directions." On Metacritic, the film has a weighted average score of 52 out of 100, based on 62 critics, indicating "mixed or average" reviews. Upon release, it became the lowest-rated MCU film on both websites and the first installment to be classified as "rotten" on Rotten Tomatoes. Audiences polled by CinemaScore gave the film an average grade of "B" on an A+ to F scale, the lowest grade for an MCU film at the time of its release, and PostTrak reported 78% of audience members gave it a positive score, with 60% saying they would definitely recommend it.

Charlotte O'Sullivan of the Evening Standard described the film as "lavish" and "ambitious", and praised the fight sequences as "astounding, beautifully paced and crammed with detail". Robert Abele of TheWrap commended the cinematography and felt "an earnestness to the operatic stakes". Oliver Jones of the Observer called it "full of wonder and romance and fueled by an agenda and audacity all its own". Owen Gleiberman was disappointed over Zhao's missing filmmaking style that shaped her films The Rider (2017) and Nomadland (2020) to "embrace the straight-up expository conventionality of Marvel filmmaking", but felt that the film was a "squarely fun and gratifying watch". Moira Macdonald of The Seattle Times thought "it's got some pretty slow spots midfilm and it's desperately in need of a bit more wit ... what it does have is a palpable, artful mood; this is a movie full of superheroes who spend time thinking and feeling, and of special effects that aren't just zippy but often delicately elegant".

Linda Marric of The Jewish Chronicle described it as "a mishmash of well-meaning, yet jarringly verbose and bafflingly incoherent nonsense which is only just about saved by some half decent performances"; Nicholas Barber of BBC Culture called Zhao's direction "workmanlike"; and Clarisse Loughrey of The Independent said that it "strives for the same expansive soulfulness" as Nomadland "but discovers there's room enough only for the occasional burst of it". Brian Truitt of USA Today praised Zhao's "penchant for naturalistic environments", but wrote that the narrative "struggles to juggle its many subplots and tries to do too much". Mark Kennedy of the Associated Press criticized the dialogue and fight scenes, but praised the visual effects and Nanjiani's performance. Shirley Li of The Atlantic felt that "Zhao's delicate examination of her characters outshines Eternals' duller and more convoluted moments".

Robbie Collin wrote the film was "constantly engaged in a kind of grit-toothed authenticity theatre, going out of its way to show you it's doing all the things proper cinema does, even though none of them bring any discernible benefit"; Kevin Maher felt "a strange self-sabotaging energy at the heart"; and Steve Rose of The Guardian missed "the breezy wit of Marvel's best movies ... like coming into Avengers: Endgame cold without having seen any of the preceding installments". K. Austin Collins of Rolling Stone felt that the film was "good at telling us where to look, at impressing us with its manufactured sense of grandeur", but lacked "any credible sense of what's actually worth seeing". Justin Chang of the Los Angeles Times had a "depressing realization that you've just seen one of the more interesting movies Marvel will ever make, and hopefully the least interesting one Chloé Zhao will ever make". Brian Lowry of CNN thought "the movie's structural flaws offset its stunning visuals and strong performances". Kyle Smith of National Review was harsher, describing it as "one of the dumbest, cheesiest, most trite, and least human" of the MCU films.

The mixed reception surprised some commentators, given the MCU's positive track record and the acclaim of Zhao's previous work. Richard Newby of The Hollywood Reporter wrote that "much of the criticism of Kirby's work", which was divisive for its subject matter and relationship to the wider Marvel Universe, "has followed Zhao in her adaptation." He compared the divided response to that of Zack Snyder's DC Extended Universe (DCEU) films Man of Steel and Batman v Superman: Dawn of Justice (2016), writing that they and Eternals share "a deconstructive approach to superheroes and force them to question their purpose in the world, through meditative and melancholy narrative beats, and a tragic yet hopeful ending." This approach, he felt, subverted critics' and audiences' expectations, which made them review the film more harshly. Zhao addressed some of the criticisms of the film, believing some of the division came from everyone "having an existential crisis" because of the COVID-19 pandemic and the film being an "existential crisis, both for humanity and God". She also felt the reactions to how the film incorporated her filmmaking sensibilities with Marvel's were "a testament to how much we had merged with each other; how uncomfortable that might make people feel".

=== Accolades ===
The film was given the Seal of Authentic Representation from the Ruderman Family Foundation for Ridloff's role as Makkari. The seal is given to films and series that feature actors with disabilities who have at least five lines of dialogue. Eternals was also one of 28 films that received the ReFrame Stamp for 2021, awarded by the gender equity coalition ReFrame for films that are proven to have gender-balanced hiring.

Accolades received by Eternals
Award	Date of ceremony	Category	Recipient(s)	Result	Ref.
Gold List Awards	January 18, 2022	Best Actress in a Leading Role	Gemma Chan	Won	
Hollywood Critics Association Film Awards	February 28, 2022	Best Visual Effects	Daniele Bigi, Matt Aitken, Neil Corbould, and Stephane Ceretti	Nominated	
Visual Effects Society	March 8, 2022	Outstanding Special (Practical) Effects in a Photoreal Project	Neil Corbould, Keith Corbould, Ray Ferguson, Chris Motjuoadi	Nominated	
Critics' Choice Super Awards	March 17, 2022	Best Superhero Movie	Eternals	Nominated	
Satellite Awards	April 2, 2022	Best Visual Effects	Matt Aitken, Daniele Bigi, Stephane Ceretti, and Neil Corbould	Nominated	
GLAAD Media Awards	April 2/May 6, 2022	Outstanding Film – Wide Release	Eternals	Won	
Nickelodeon Kids' Choice Awards	April 9, 2022	Favorite Movie Actress	Angelina Jolie	Nominated	
BMI Film & TV Awards	May 11, 2022	BMI Theatrical Film Awards	Ramin Djawadi	Won	
Saturn Awards	October 25, 2022	Best Film Costume	Sammy Sheldon	Nominated	

== Documentary special ==
In February 2021, the documentary series Marvel Studios: Assembled was announced. The special on this film, "The Making of Eternals", was released on Disney+ on February 16, 2022.

== Future ==
In October 2021, Zhao said she was open to making a sequel. The next month, Kaz and Ryan Firpo expressed interest in making a prequel series for Disney+ that would focus on one Eternal in a different time period each episode, such as an episode about Thena in Ancient Greece and one about Kingo in 1890s Mumbai where he balances his life as a film star with Mahatma Gandhi's campaign for India's independence from British rule. They also felt there were opportunities to continue the film's story by further exploring Dane Whitman and showing the Eternals confronting the Celestials. Chan said in January 2022 that she would reprise the role of Sersi in the future. Feige was asked about Styles's future in the MCU that July and said Marvel Studios was excited to further explore the characters Eros and Pip as part of the MCU's more cosmic stories. A month later, Oswalt said a sequel had been confirmed by Marvel Studios and Zhao was returning to direct. He hoped it would further explore Eros and Pip, and expressed interest in a spin-off film for the characters. In October, Moore said Marvel intended to bring back the Eternals characters in the future of the MCU. Nanjiani said the following month that he was unaware of a sequel and believed Oswalt was mistaken, but expressed interest in reprising his role as Kingo. Don Lee's talent agency indicated in December that he would reprise his role as Gilgamesh in an Eternals sequel. Oswalt clarified his statements in February 2023, saying a sequel was not in development at that time and that he had been misled. In July 2024, Feige said there were no plans for a sequel at the time. In August 2025, Nanjiani said the film's poor reception "shattered [him]" and tempered his expectations of reprising the role for the next ten years.

== See also ==
- List of films featuring the deaf and hard of hearing
