= Kaz Firpo =

American film director and screenwriter

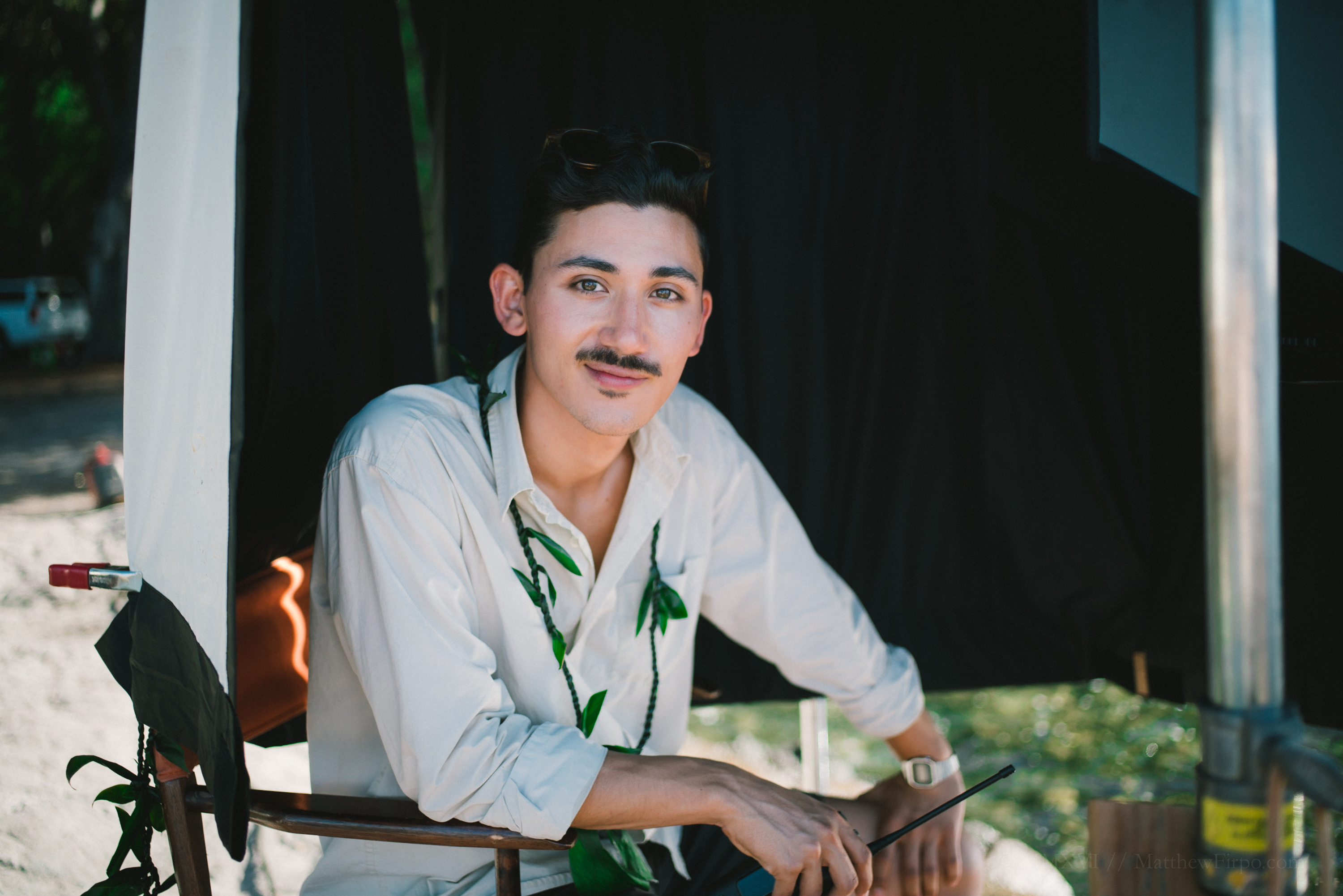
- Born: Matthew Kazuo Firpo; August 14, 1990 (age 36); San Francisco, California, U.S.
- Education: New York University
- Occupations: Director; Photographer; Screenwriter

Matthew Kazuo Firpo is an American film director, screenwriter, and photographer. Along with his cousin, Ryan, he wrote the story for the Marvel Cinematic Universe film Eternals. His debut documentary Refuge won Best Documentary at the Santa Barbara International Film Festival, and had its world premiere at SXSW.

He graduated in 2012 from the New York University Tisch School of the Arts undergraduate program. At age 25, Firpo was named one of the Forbes 30 Under 30 in 2016. His debut screenplay Ruin topped Hollywood's 2017 Black List. Until 2020 he was known as Matt Firpo professionally; he changed his public name to Kaz Firpo (based on his middle name) prior to the release of Eternals.

== Early life ==
Firpo was born and raised in San Francisco, California, the youngest son of artists Claudia Katayanagi and Patrick Firpo, and brother of creative director Danny Firpo. He graduated from Sir Francis Drake High School in Marin County in 2008, making his first films with a borrowed video camera from school. He then attended New York University, majoring in Film & Television and Classical Studies at the Tisch School of the Arts.

== Career ==
Firpo began as a commercial director straight out of film school, working with startups Snapchat and Tinder in their early days to direct their first commercials. His work with Tinder earned him a spot in Adweek's 2015 Top Commercials of the Year.

Firpo's directorial debut, Refuge, documented human stories from the Syrian refugee crisis. The film was shot in Leros, Lesvos, and Athens, Greece. The film premiered at SXSW, and won Best Documentary at the Santa Barbara International Film Festival. He went on to work internationally with UNICEF, creating an original documentary series highlighting their frontline work in Chiapas, Mexico and Kingston, Jamaica.

His debut short film, Child's Play, starring Tony Award-winner David Alvarez, won Best Screenplay at the Beverly Hills Film Festival.

Firpo's 2017 Black List-winning script, Ruin, co-written with his cousin and writing partner Ryan Firpo, had Margot Robbie attached, and Justin Kurzel set to direct. His original tropicpunk thriller Mimi from Rio was purchased in a bidding war by Netflix, and has Ridley Scott set to produce.

In May 2018, it was announced that the Firpos were hired by Marvel Studios to write Eternals based on the Marvel Comics space gods of the same name, to be released as part of "Phase Four" of the MCU. The film wrapped principal photography in February 2020, and in May 2021 it was announced that the film's director, Academy Award-winner Chloé Zhao, and Patrick Burleigh, would share screenplay credit with the Firpos, and that the Firpos would receive sole story credit. Eternals was released in November 2021, and grossed over $401 million worldwide, becoming the tenth-highest-grossing film of 2021.

Netflix announced in 2021 that Kaz Firpo and Ryan Firpo had been hired to launch the Millarworld Cinematic Universe by adapting Mark Millar's epic adventure series, Prodigy, as a globetrotting tentpole franchise. In October, Firpo created the YouTube Original Series SiGNALS, a mixed-media extravaganza exploring climate change through the wild hopes, fears, and anxieties of everyday objects.

In November 2021, SlashFilm confirmed that Firpo is writing and directing his debut feature film, The Motor City Girls, a myth of the American midwest about five half-sisters with strange and dangerous powers hunting down a cult in 1990s Detroit.

== Filmography ==
- Refuge (2017) – director, producer
- SiGNALS (2021) – creator, director
- Eternals (2021) – screenplay (with Chloé Zhao, Patrick Burleigh and Ryan Firpo), story (with Ryan Firpo)
