= Chloé Zhao =

Chinese filmmaker (born 1982)

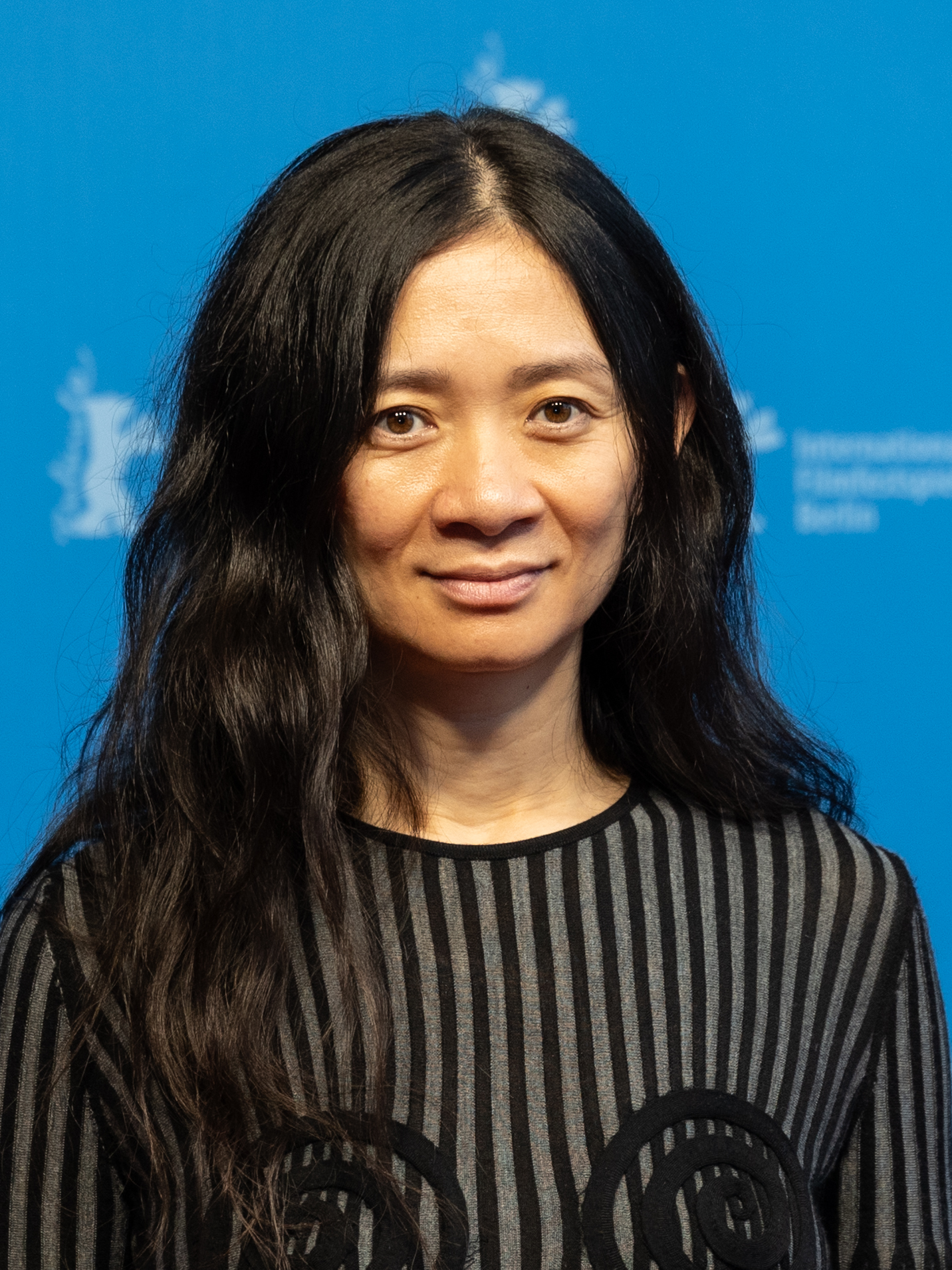
- Zhao at the 2026 Berlinale
- Born: Zhao Ting; 31 March 1982 (age 44); Beijing, China
- Education: Mount Holyoke College (BA); New York University (MFA)
- Occupations: Film director; screenwriter; film producer; film editor
- Years active: 2008–present
- Awards: Full list

Chinese name
- Simplified Chinese: 赵婷
- Traditional Chinese: 趙婷
Transcriptions
Standard Mandarin
- Hanyu Pinyin: Zhào Tíng
- Wade–Giles: Chao^{4} T'ing^{2}
- IPA: [ʈʂâʊ tʰǐŋ]

Chloé Zhao (born Zhao Ting; (Note: simplified Chinese: 赵婷; traditional Chinese: 趙婷; pinyin: Zhào Tíng) 31 March 1982) is a Chinese filmmaker. She is known primarily for her work on independent films. For her film Nomadland (2020), Zhao became the second woman (after Kathryn Bigelow) and first woman of colour to win the Academy Award for Best Director.

Songs My Brothers Taught Me (2015), her debut feature film, premiered at Sundance Film Festival to critical acclaim and earned a nomination for the Independent Spirit Award for Best First Feature. The Rider (2017) was critically acclaimed and received nominations for the Independent Spirit Award for Best Film and Best Director.

Zhao garnered international recognition with the American film Nomadland (2020), which she wrote, produced, edited and directed, and which won numerous accolades, including the Golden Lion at the Venice Film Festival and the People's Choice Award at the Toronto International Film Festival. Earning four Academy Award nominations for the film, Zhao won Best Picture and Best Director, becoming the first woman of color to win the latter. She also won awards for directing at the Directors Guild of America Awards, Golden Globe Awards, and British Academy Film Awards, becoming the second female winner of each of them.

Zhao co-wrote and directed the Marvel Cinematic Universe superhero film Eternals (2021). Her 2025 film, Hamnet, premiered at the 52nd Telluride Film Festival to critical acclaim. It won the Golden Globe Award for Best Motion Picture – Drama in 2025, the BAFTA Award for Outstanding British Film and was nominated for the Academy Award for Best Picture. Zhao also received her second nomination for the Academy Award for Best Director, becoming only the second woman, after Jane Campion, to achieve two nominations in this category.

== Early life and education ==
Chloé Zhao was born Zhao Ting (赵婷; Zhào Tíng) on 31 March 1982, in Beijing, China. Her father, Zhao Yuji (赵玉吉; Zhào Yùjí), was a successful executive at Shougang Group, one of the country's largest state-owned steel companies. Song Dandan, her stepmother, is a well-known Chinese actress who was in various sitcoms, mostly known for her appearance in Home with Kids.

According to her own description, Zhao was a curious child who was drawn to Western pop culture, especially in the realm of film and music. Zhao was uninterested in school in Beijing, as she focused on art and her own pursuits instead. As a teenager, Zhao described herself as a "rebellious and lazy student" who was more interested in drawing manga-style comics and writing fan fiction than in academics. She was strongly influenced by the films of Wong Kar-wai, particularly Happy Together. During this period of her life, her parents divorced. Her father remarried Song Dandan. Although she was still learning English at the time, her parents sent her to Brighton College in 1998 at the age of 15. Zhao later moved to Los Angeles by herself in 2000, living in a Koreatown apartment and attending Los Angeles High School. Afterwards, she attended Mount Holyoke College, where she majored in politics and minored in film studies, graduating in 2005.

Post-graduation, while bartending and working odd jobs, Zhao realized she enjoyed meeting people and hearing about their lives, giving her the push to attend film school. A Vulture article reported that "Four years was enough to turn her off of politics...she found herself drawn more to people than to policy". In 2010, she followed up on her undergraduate film minor by joining the Kanbar Institute of Film and Television Graduate Film Program at New York University's Tisch School of the Arts.

== Career ==
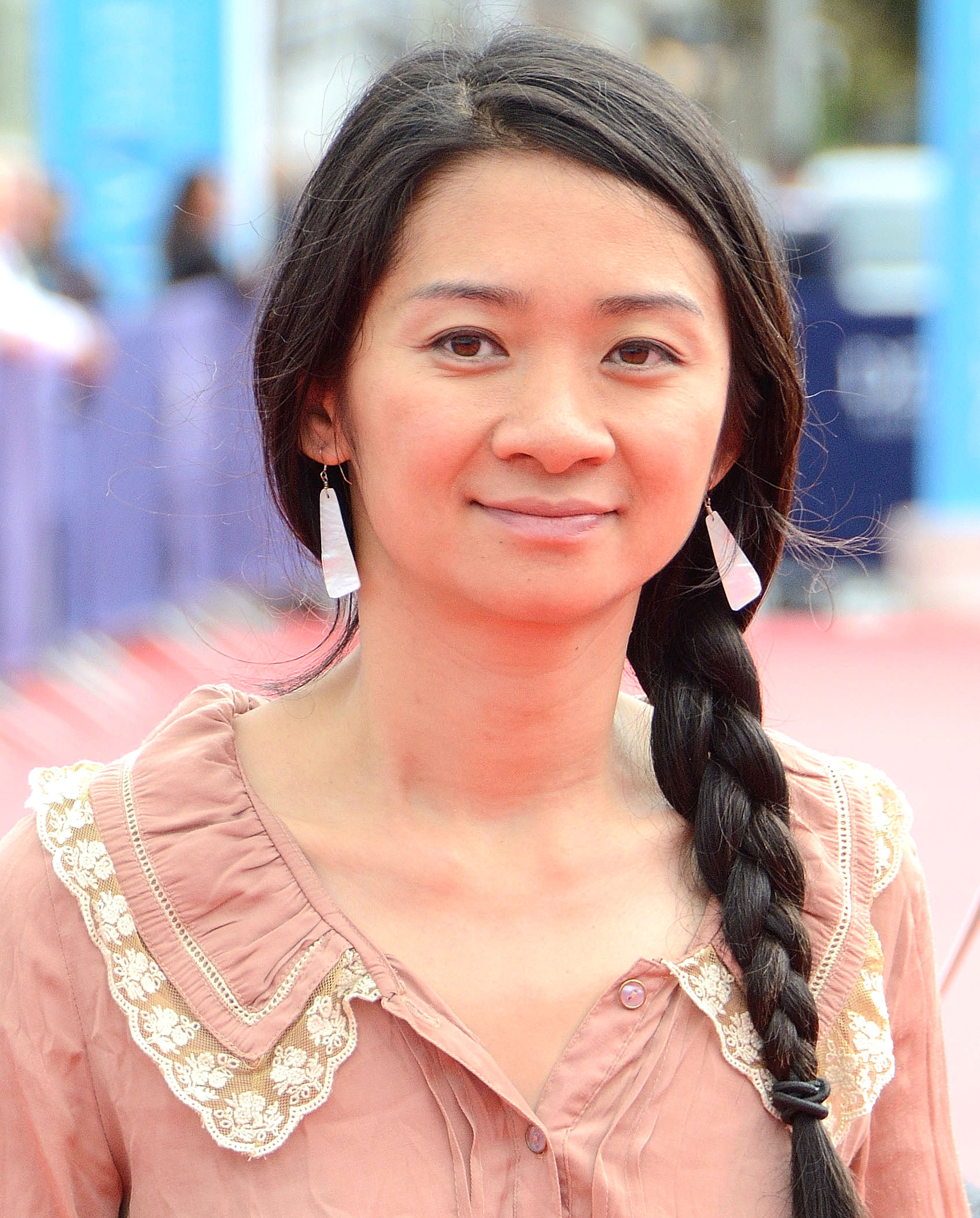
Zhao in 2015

Zhao's first short film The Atlas Mountains, released in 2009, was about a woman who develops a brief yet passionate relationship with an immigrant worker who comes to fix her computer. In 2010, while at New York University, she released a second short film, Daughters, about a 14-year-old girl living in rural China who is forced into an arranged marriage and attempts to break free. It won First Place Student Live Action Short at the 2010 Palm Springs International Short Fest and Special Jury Prize at the 2010 Cinequest Film Festival.

In 2015, Zhao premiered her debut feature, Songs My Brothers Taught Me, at the Sundance Film Festival as part of the U.S. Dramatic Competition. Shot on location at the Pine Ridge Indian Reservation in South Dakota, the film depicts the relationship between a Lakota Sioux man and his younger sister. Partially improvised, around 100 hours of footage was collected as Zhao worked with the real residents of the reservation to draw inspiration from their lives and personalities in order to help shape the story. Zhao noted that her experience leaving China to study abroad helped her connect to the story of a character struggling with the decision to leave his hometown.

The film was praised for its intimate storytelling and its portrayal of Lakota Sioux life. After the Sundance premiere, it was later played at Cannes Film Festival as part of the Director's Fortnight selection and was nominated for Best First Feature at the 31st Independent Spirit Awards.

In 2017, Zhao directed The Rider, a contemporary western drama, which follows a young cowboy's journey to self-discovery after a near-fatal accident ends his professional riding career. The film was executive produced by her father, Yuji Zhao. As with her first feature, Zhao engaged a cast of non-actors who lived at the filming location, in this case on a ranch. The film was praised for being an innovative spin on the Western, with Zhao's perspective as a Chinese immigrant revitalising the "oldest genre."

The film premiered at Cannes Film Festival as part of the Directors' Fortnight selection and won the Art Cinema Award. It earned her nominations for Best Feature and Best Director at the 33rd Independent Spirit Awards. At the same ceremony, Zhao became the inaugural winner of the Bonnie Award, named after Bonnie Tiburzi, which recognizes a mid-career female director. The film was released on 13 April 2018 by Sony Pictures Classics and was critically acclaimed. Peter Keough of The Boston Globe wrote: "[The film] achieves what cinema is capable of at its best: It reproduces a world with such acuteness, fidelity, and empathy that it transcends the mundane and touches on the universal."

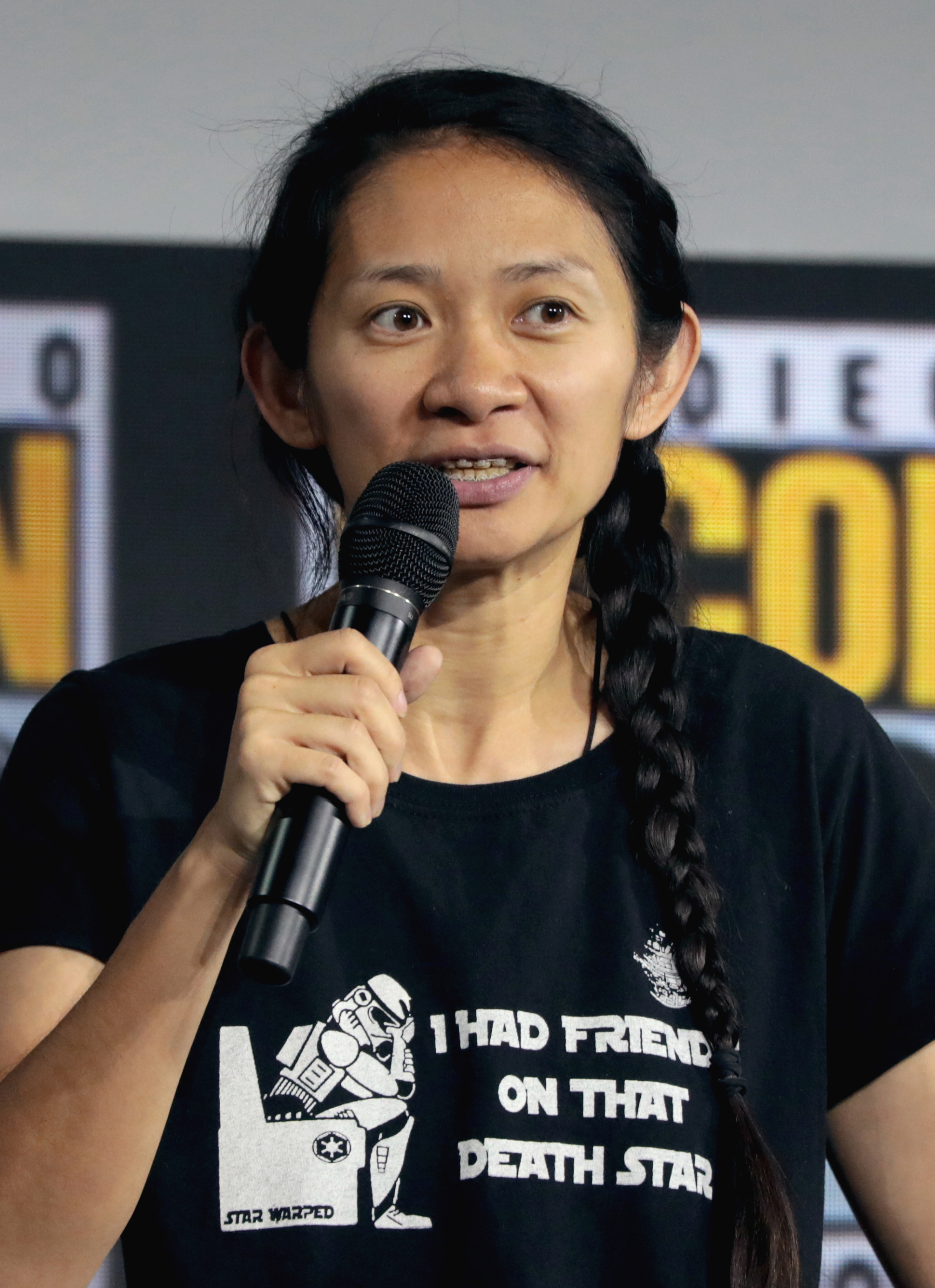
Zhao in 2019

In 2018, Zhao directed Nomadland, starring Frances McDormand. Adapted from Jessica Bruder's non-fiction book Nomadland: Surviving America in the Twenty-First Century, it was shot over four months with many actual nomadic workers. People interviewed for Bruder's book played themselves in the film. Zhao and McDormand met the day before the 2018 Independent Spirit Awards, where McDormand was nominated for Independent Spirit Award for Best Female Lead and Zhao received a $50,000 grant for women directors. During the event, they hinted at their future project together.

Nomadland premiered at the Venice Film Festival, where it received critical acclaim and won the Golden Lion award, and subsequently played at the 2020 Toronto International Film Festival, where it won the People's Choice Award. The film was released on 19 February 2021, by Searchlight Pictures. Zhao won the Golden Globe Award for Best Director for Nomadland, making her the first woman of Asian descent honored, and only the second woman to win a Golden Globe for directing since Barbra Streisand in 1984. In April 2021, Zhao won the Academy Award for Best Director, becoming the second woman to do so (Kathryn Bigelow being the first). The film did not receive a theatrical release in China, with speculation that it was due to her past comments on the nation. News of her Best Director win at the Academy Awards was also censored.

In September 2018, Marvel Studios hired Zhao to direct Eternals, based on the comic book characters of the same name. The film follows the events of the 2019 Marvel movie Avengers: Endgame, featuring a new team of superheroes that must reunite in order to fight an ancient enemy of the human race. Zhao named Ridley Scott's Prometheus and Nick Cassavetes' The Notebook as influences on the film. It was released on 5 November 2021. Zhao is both the director and one of the four writers of the film, the others being Patrick Burleigh, Ryan Firpo, and Kaz Firpo. Eternals received mixed reviews. The New Yorker stated that Zhao's style of directing dialogue scenes "reveals the absurdity of the script," saying "it might as well have been done via green screen, for the little tangibility and texture that it offers the characters and viewers alike." The article also claimed that the film has reportedly been banned in Saudi Arabia and Kuwait due to the relationship between two male characters, Phastos and Ben. In spite of negative reviews, it still made $161.7 million during its opening weekend and became No. 1 at the box office. Critics noted Zhao's efforts to integrate her own visual realism into a classic superhero genre format.

In 2023, Zhao served as an executive producer on The Graduates directed by Hannah Peterson.

In April 2023, Zhao was announced to be directing a film adaptation of Hamnet, with Jessie Buckley and Paul Mescal in talks to star in the film and Amblin Partners to be producing. The film premiered at the 52nd Telluride Film Festival to critical acclaim. It subsequently played at the 2025 Toronto International Film Festival, where it won the People's Choice Award, making Zhao a director to win the TIFF's People's Choice Award twice.

In February 2025, it was announced that Zhao would be directing the pilot episode for a revival of Buffy the Vampire Slayer on Hulu. On 14 March 2026, Sarah Michelle Gellar revealed that Hulu passed on the pilot.

== Filmmaking styles and techniques ==
=== Human connection and realism ===
Zhao's films consistently explore themes of loneliness, identity, displacement, connection, and the search for belonging. Her characters are often positioned as domesticated people in society and are portrayed through natural lighting and lived-in locations, often blurring the line between fictional storyline and documentary. Believing filmmakers tell their stories to not feel alone, she focuses on the themes of authenticity and places an emphasis on real stories.

Frances McDormand told Rolling Stone that Zhao is "basically like a journalist...she gets to know your story, and she creates a character from that" and that she "draws a razor-sharp line between sentiment and sentimentality". A Filmmaker article quoted Zhao as saying, "I want to find new ways to place the camera to evoke more of a feeling. My goal is to put the camera inside of [the character]". An example of her process can be found in Eternals when she saw the connection between actors Lauren Ridloff and Barry Keoghan, who play Makkari and Druig, respectively. She states, "It's the same as I did with Nomadland and The Rider. I would see how they interact and I would write that into the film".

Zhao's style of character-driven realism was also influenced through the scriptwriting process of Andrea Arnold's adaptation of Wuthering Heights for the way its characters are shown interacting with their environment. In a fantasy realm perspective, she mentions The Lord of the Rings, praising the series for their immersive landscapes. She mentions the films had an emphasis on scenic cinematography, as they inspired her for that immersive visual approach with vivid storytelling. These influences also explain her tendency to center characters with their surroundings, which allows emotion and settings to coexist.

=== Female gaze ===
Zhao's style also leans on perspective of the female gaze. In a 2023 interview with Brut America, she mentions, "For me, there is a yin and yang in all of us, feminine and masculine strength and I think often in our society in our industry, the masculine strength is being celebrated, and that's a painful way to exist both for women and men." On directing these myriad of characters from the female perspective, she says, "I always try to find a way to give them a chance to be in touch with their feminine side...We must also allow our male characters to access their softer side, I think that's the true female gaze."

== Influences ==
Zhao cites Wong Kar-wai's romance Happy Together as the "film that made me want to make films". She was also influenced by Spike Lee, who was her film professor while she studied at New York University's Tisch School of the Arts. She cited Ang Lee as an influence as well, saying, "Ang Lee's career has been very inspiring to me — how he's able to bring where he comes from to all the films that he makes". She also has mentioned Werner Herzog and Terrence Malick as key influences. In a January 2026 episode of The Interview podcast, Zhao revealed that Malick had called her — despite the two never having met before — on New Year's Day that year. During the conversation Zhao told Malick that she was a part of his storytelling "lineage". As for her early introductions to American cinema, they were The Terminator, Ghost, and Sister Act.

== China controversy ==
After Zhao became the second woman to win a Golden Globe Award for Best Director for Nomadland, many Chinese viewers, as well as Chinese state media, celebrated her win and "sought to claim Zhao's glory for China". Shortly afterward, some netizens began to question Zhao's citizenship and debated "whether it is appropriate to claim Zhao's victory as China's", with Variety calling the claim "a common move by state-backed outlets to drum up nationalism". Much of the controversy hinged on two sets of remarks: a 2013 Filmmaker magazine interview in which Zhao described China as "a place where there are lies everywhere", and a late 2020 interview in which Zhao was misquoted as saying, "The US is now my country". She had actually said, "The US is not my country", and the error was corrected around two months later. References to Zhao in Chinese media were censored following her Oscar win.

== Personal life ==
Until 2023, Zhao was in a relationship with English cinematographer Joshua James Richards, with whom she also collaborated on a number of her films. Richards and Zhao met while they were film students at New York University.

Zhao considers herself to be neurodivergent, which she describes as a "superpower".

== Filmography ==
=== Feature film ===
Year	Title	Director	Writer	Producer	Editor	Notes	Ref.
2015	Songs My Brothers Taught Me	Yes	Yes	Yes	Yes		
2017	The Rider	Yes	Yes	Yes	No		
2020	Nomadland	Yes	Yes	Yes	Yes		
2021	Eternals	Yes	Yes	No	No	Co-written with Patrick Burleigh, Ryan Firpo and Kaz Firpo	
2023	The Graduates	No	No	Executive	No		
2025	Hamnet	Yes	Yes	Executive	Yes	Co-written with Maggie O'Farrell	

=== Short film ===
Year	Title	Director	Writer	Producer	Editor	Ref.
2008	Helen's First Date in Two Years	No	No	Yes	No	
2008	Post	Yes	Yes	Yes	Yes	
2009	The Atlas Mountains	Yes	Yes	Yes	Yes	
2009	Simple Pleasures	No	No	Yes	No	
2010	Daughters	Yes	Yes	Yes	No	
2011	Benachin	Yes	No	No	No	

=== Television ===
Year	Title	Director	Writer	Producer	Editor	Ref.
2025	Buffy the Vampire Slayer: New Sunnydale	Yes	No	Executive	No	

=== Commercials ===
- A Clydesdale's Journey (2022) for Budweiser
- Diablo IV: Saviors Wanted (2023) for Blizzard Entertainment

== Awards and nominations ==
Daughters (2010) won First Place Student Live Action Short at the 2010 Palm Springs International Short Fest and Special Jury Prize at the 2010 Cinequest Film Festival. In 2021 Zhao's Nomadland (2020) won the Academy Award for Best Picture and the Academy Award for Best Director. Nomadland (2020) also won the Golden Globe Award for Best Director, the BAFTA Award for Best Direction, the BAFTA Award for Best Film, the Independent Spirit Award for Best Director, the Independent Spirit Award for Best Editing, the Critic's Choice Movie Award for Best Adapted Screenplay, and the Critic's Choice Movie Award for Best Director.

Zhao was nominated for Best Director and Best Adapted Screenplay at the 98th Academy Awards in 2026 for Hamnet. It was also nominated for Best Picture. It won awards for the Best Motion Picture – Drama at the 83rd Golden Globe Awards, and Outstanding British Film at the 79th British Academy Film Awards.

In December 2024, Chloé Zhao was included on the BBC's 100 Women list.
