= Patrick Burleigh =

American screenwriter, playwright, and essayist

- Born: 1979 (age 46–47); New York City, New York, US
- Education: Dartmouth College, Trinity College Dublin
- Occupations: Screenwriter, essayist
- Years active: 2015–Present
- Notable work: Eternals, Peter Rabbit 2: The Runaway, Ant-Man and the Wasp
- Awards: 2017 Humanitas Play LA Award, 2022 Gold List Honorable Mention for Best Adapted Screenplay - Eternals

Patrick Burleigh is an American screenwriter, playwright, and essayist. He is best known as a screenwriter for Eternals, Peter Rabbit 2: The Runaway, and Ant-Man and the Wasp. Burleigh grew up in New York City and Los Angeles before attending Dartmouth College and Trinity College Dublin. In 2015, he sold his screenplay adaptation of Nicholas Griffin’s book Ping-Pong Diplomacy: The Secret History Behind the Game That Changed the World to Village Roadshow Pictures.

== History ==
In 2016, Burleigh was accepted into the Marvel Writer’s Program for Marvel Studios. Upon graduating from the program, Burleigh began writing reshoot material for Ant-Man and the Wasp before working with director Chloé Zhao to write the shooting script for Eternals, both for Marvel Studios. During this time, Burleigh also co-wrote the screenplay for Peter Rabbit 2: The Runaway from Sony Pictures. In 2021, he was nominated for an Australian Academy of Cinema and Television Arts Award (AACTA) in the Best Adapted Screenplay in Film category for Peter Rabbit 2: The Runaway. In 2017, Burleigh won the Humanitas Play LA Award, and he received an Honorable Mention in the Best Adapted Screenplay category at the 2022 Gold List Awards for Eternals.

Burleigh has written for publications such as New York (magazine) and Men’s Health. In 2019, Burleigh wrote an essay for New York describing his childhood living with a genetic mutation of the luteinizing hormone/choriogonadotropin receptor (LHCGR), also known as testotoxicosis or familial male-limited precocious puberty. The mutation, which is hereditary and was passed down through Burleigh’s father’s family line, triggered an early puberty in Burleigh at two years of age.
