= List of The Super Hero Squad Show episodes =

This is a list of episodes for the TV show The Super Hero Squad Show.

In the opening sequence of the first season, the Hulk picks up an Infinity Fractal, and is transformed by its power into something different every episode. This feature was later removed for the second season. Additionally, each episode's title card is an homage to a classic comic book cover, as are some of the episode titles.

== Series overview ==
Season	Episodes	Originally released	
Season	Episodes	First released	Last released
1	26	September 14, 2009	February 20, 2010
2	26	October 23, 2010	October 14, 2011

== Episodes ==
=== Season 1: 2009–10 ===
No.	Title	Directed by	Written by	Title card's issue homage	Original release date	Prod. code
1	"And Lo... A Pilot Shall Come!"	Michael R. Gerard	Matt Wayne	Fantastic Four #1	September 14, 2009	101
The Super Hero Squad fights to keep a fractal away from Doctor Doom when he sends Mole Man and his monsters to attack Super Hero City. Meanwhile, Mole Man incorporates the fractal into his stick, gaining super-speed and mind control powers. Hulk's Transformation: Baby Hulk First appearance: Iron Man, Ms. Marvel, Mayor of Superhero City, Captain America, Wolverine, Hulk, Falcon, Redwing, Silver Surfer, Thor, Doctor Doom, Mole Man, Storm, Fin Fang Foom, Megataur, Tricephalous, Manoo, Fantastic Four (Mister Fantastic, Invisible Woman, Human Torch, Thing), Abomination, Colossus, Kitty Pryde, Luke Cage, Moloids
2	"This Silver, This Surfer!"	Michael R. Gerard	Mark Hoffmeier	Fantastic Four #50	September 14, 2009	102
The squad gets frustrated when Silver Surfer cannot get the hang of Earth customs. Doctor Doom sends Abomination and MODOK to capture the Silver Surfer to siphon his cosmic power. The Super Hero Squad and the Thing set out to save him while Doom uses the siphoned Power Cosmic to meld his various fractals together into a Fractal Dagger. Hulk's Transformation: Grey Hulk First appearance: MODOK
3	"Hulk Talk Smack!"	Patty Shinagawa	Eugene Son	The Incredible Hulk #1	September 26, 2009	103
During a chaotic battle with Klaw and Screaming Mimi, a fractal's cosmic power turns the Hulk into the Gray Hulk. His new form makes him highly intelligent and pacifistic, and believing the Super Hero Squad to be childish. To redeem themselves, Klaw and Screaming Mimi rendezvous with Melter and Toad to find a fractal at the local reservoir. Hulk's Transformation: MODOH (Mental Organism designed only for Hulking) First appearance: Wasp, Klaw, Screaming Mimi, Toad, Melter, Damage Control
4	"To Err is Superhuman!"	Michael R. Gerard	James Krieg	Thor #148	October 3, 2009	104
Wolverine is assigned to train Reptil, while Doctor Doom sends Abomination and the Wrecking Crew to get the latest fractal. Hulk's Transformation: Joe Fixit First appearance: Reptil, Hawkeye, Wrecking Crew (Wrecker, Thunderball, Piledriver, Bulldozer), Doombots
5	"Enter: Dormammu!"	Patty Shinagawa	Charlotte Fullerton	Strange Tales #122	October 10, 2009	105
Supernatural wackiness is turning Super Hero City upside down during the Super Hero Squad's fight with Sabretooth and Juggernaut. The Super Hero Squad seek the help of Doctor Strange, who is acting unusually. Doctor Strange opens a portal to the Dark Dimension enabling Dormammu to enter and seek the fractals stored at the Vault and in Villainville. Hulk's Transformation: Mecha-Hulk First appearance: Doctor Strange, Dormammu, Mindless Ones, Sabretooth, Juggernaut, Wong
6	"A Brat Walks Among Us!"	Michael R. Gerard	Michael Ryan	Power Man and Iron Fist #50	October 17, 2009	106
A bratty 3-year-old named Brynnie Bratton hires the Heroes for Hire (consisting of Luke Cage, Iron Fist, and Misty Knight) to help her find her father, but is also wearing a tiara with a fractal making her invincible. The heroes and villains must put up with her superpowered temper-tantrums while Falcon helps Heroes for Hire track down Brynnie's father and bring her under control. Hulk's Transformation: Wolverine-Hulk First appearance: Iron Fist, Misty Knight, Pyro, Whirlwind, Zzzax, Brynnie Bratton
7	"Oh Brother!"	Michael R. Gerard	Nicole Dubuc	The Avengers #1	October 20, 2009	107
Loki convinces Doctor Doom to invade Asgard with Loki's army, and persuades him to let him borrow Abomination, MODOK, Klaw, Melter, and Sabretooth to help him. Sif gets Thor, along with the help of Falcon, Reptil, and Wolverine, to help fight the Lethal Legion. Meanwhile, Iron Man, Hulk, and Silver Surfer try to break into Villainville to steal Doctor Doom's fractals. Hulk's Transformation: Bruce Banner First appearance: Loki, Sif, Heimdall, Warriors Three (Fandral, Hogun, Volstagg)
8	"From the Atom... It Rises!"	Patty Shinagawa	Mark Hoffmeier	Nick Fury, Agent of S.H.I.E.L.D. #1	October 21, 2009	108
When Scorpio tries to steal top-secret Stark Tech, the Super Hero Squad team tries to figure out Scorpio's plot. What neither they nor Doctor Doom, MODOK, Abomination, and even Mole Man know yet is that Scorpio is actually Nick Fury in disguise. Hulk's Transformation: Vision First appearance: Nick Fury, Scorpio
9	"Night in the Sanctorum!"	Michael R. Gerard	John Rozum	Strange Tales #150	October 22, 2009	109
Enchantress uses her magic to crash the Helicarrier into the Great Wall near Villainville, and Ms. Marvel blames Falcon, as he was driving it at the time. After attempts to bunk in at Stark Industries, Punisher's van, and Reptil's house, the Super Hero Squad try to bunk at the Sanctum Sanctorum where Doctor Strange warns them that there is a magic threat responsible for their misfortunes. Hulk's Transformation: Saturday Night Fever Hulk First appearances: Enchantress, Baron Mordo, Punisher, Texas Twister (as a picture), Lockheed (as a picture)
10	"This Forest Green!"	Patty Shinagawa	Atul Rao	Tales to Astonish #35	October 23, 2009	110
When MODOK and Abomination botched up another fractal retrieval mission, Doctor Doom pairs them up with Egghead to infiltrate the Helicarrier in micro-size. When Ant-Man is called in to help, it is a micro-sized, all-out battle for the fractal. Hulk's Transformation: Simpson Hulk. First appearances: Ant-Man, Egghead
11	"O, Captain, My Captain!"	Michael R. Gerard	Nicole Dubuc	Giant-Size X-Men #1	October 24, 2009	111
When he is tired of all he can take with the Super Hero Squad, Wolverine joins up with the international All-Captains Squad (consisting of Captain America, Captain Australia, Captain Brazil, Captain Britain, and Captain Liechtenstein) as Captain Canada where he helps them fight Plantman in the Amazon. Meanwhile, the rest of the Super Hero Squad have an embarrassing encounter at Ringmaster's circus when Doctor Doom sends Abomination and MODOK to recruit Ringmaster. Hulk's Transformation: Baby Hulk First appearances: Captain Australia, Captain Brazil, Captain Britain, Captain Liechtenstein, Plantman, Ringmaster
12	"If This Be My Thanos!"	Patty Shinagawa	Eugene Son	Fantastic Four #18	October 31, 2009	112
With some of the members on vacation, Iron Man, Thor and Hulk help out the Fantastic Four when Super-Skrull and his fellow Skrulls invade Super Hero City. Meanwhile, Thanos and Doctor Doom form an alliance to obtain a specific artifact from the Baxter Building. While the Fantastic Four and the other Super Hero Squad members are fighting the Skrulls, Falcon and H.E.R.B.I.E. defend the Baxter Building from Abomination, MODOK, and Trapster. Hulk's Transformation: Gray Hulk First appearances: H.E.R.B.I.E., The Skrulls, Super-Skrull, Trapster, Thanos (actually a Skrull in disguise)
13	"Deadly Is The Black Widow's Bite!"	Michael R. Gerard	Story: Charlotte Fullerton; Teleplay: Eugene Son	Tales of Suspense #53	November 7, 2009	113
Black Widow joins the Super Hero Squad and shows that she can hold her ground against Abomination, MODOK, and Screaming Mimi. Unbeknownst to them, she is really Mystique in disguise sent by Doctor Doom to steal the Infinity Fractals. When the villains nearly obtain the Infinity Fractals held at the Vault, the Super Hero Squad receives unlikely assistance from S.H.I.E.L.D. Agent Songbird, who had been undercover as Screaming Mimi all along. Villains: Abomination, MODOK, Mystique, Doctor Doom, Klaw and Toad. Hulk's Transformation: MODOH (Mental Organism Designed Only for Hulking) First appearances: Black Widow, Mystique, Songbird
14	"Tremble at the Might of... M.O.D.O.K.!"	Patty Shinagawa	Mark Hoffmeier	The Avengers #118	November 14, 2009	114
MODOK and Loki conspire to overthrow Doctor Doom and take his place as leader of his allied villain group after MODOK eats one of the fractals. To stop MODOK and Loki, the Super Hero Squad and Storm must team up with Black Panther and an unlikely ally... Doctor Doom. Hulk's Transformation: Joe Fixit First appearances: Black Panther, Impossible Man, Leader, Tana Nile, Uatu the Watcher, Mad Thinker
15	"Mental Organism Designed Only for Kisses!"	Michael R. Gerard	Matt Wayne	The Avengers #7	November 21, 2009	115
Enchantress uses a spell to make Thor fall in love with her. Instead, it backfires, causing Ms. Marvel to fall in love with MODOK. This causes S.H.I.E.L.D. to have Hawkeye take out Ms. Marvel before MODOK brings her to Doctor Doom's side. At the same time, Executioner plans to defeat Thor and get Enchantress to love him. Thor also falls in love with Valkyrie. Hulk's Transformation: Hulk Bot First appearances: Executioner, Valkyrie, Odin (mystical hologram)
16	"Invader From the Dark Dimension!"	Patty Shinagawa	Mark Hoffmeier	The Defenders v1 #2	December 5, 2009	116
When Baron Mordo possesses Iron Man turning him into the Iron Menace and escapes from the Dark Dimension, he plans to take over Super Hero City and Villainville. When Wolverine, Falcon, and Redwing end up under Iron Menace's control, Hulk, Silver Surfer, and Thor must team up with Doctor Strange and Valkyrie to form a team of Defenders and stop Baron Mordo's evil plot. Doctor Doom and MODOK reluctantly help them when Iron Menace takes control of Abomination. Hulk's Transformation: Wolverine-Hulk
17	"Tales of Suspense!"	Patty Shinagawa	Eugene Son	Tales of Suspense #39	December 12, 2009	117
War Machine teams up with Iron Man when Doctor Doom, Crimson Dynamo, and Melter band together in a plot to eliminate Iron Man. Meanwhile, Wolverine and Reptil face off against Abomination and MODOK in a game of golf. Hulk's Transformation: Bruce Banner First appearances: Crimson Dynamo, War Machine
18	"Stranger From a Savage Land!"	Michael R. Gerard	John Rozum	X-Men #10	December 19, 2009	118
When Ka-Zar's Smilodon Zabu is brought to Super Hero City from the Savage Land, Ka-Zar comes to the city as well to find him. Meanwhile, Doctor Doom sends Toad, Thunderball, Sabretooth, and Batroc the Leaper to steal Zabu and reforge the Infinity Sword using the Star Quartz in his collar. Hulk's Transformation: Vision First appearance: Ka-Zar, Zabu, Batroc the Leaper
19	"Mysterious Mayhem at Mutant High!"	Michael R. Gerard	James Krieg	X-Men v2 #1	December 26, 2009	119
Captain America sends Wolverine back to Xavier Academy to get his diploma and finish his remaining credits. Reptil tags along to see what Xavier Academy is like and meet the X-Men. To make matters worse, Ringmaster shows up and hypnotizes the entire X-Men team to find an Infinity Fractal for Doctor Doom. Hulk's Transformation: Saturday Night Fever Hulk First appearance: X-Men (Cyclops, Iceman, Jean Grey, Lockheed, Professor X Shadowcat)
20	"Election of Evil!"	Patty Shinagawa	Tad Stones	Iron Man #128	January 2, 2010	120
The Mayor of Super Hero City's re-election bid goes awry when Egghead wins by a landslide (thanks to a little mass mind-control). But his reign at city hall makes life in Super Hero City a bureaucratic nightmare for heroes and villains alike. Wolverine and the Mayor are up against every hero and villain in a desperate attempt to free everyone from Egghead's control and stop the villains' planned invasion. Hulk's Transformation: Simpson Hulk.
21	"Hexed, Vexed and Perplexed!"	Michael R. Gerard	Nicole Dubuc	X-Men #1	January 9, 2010	121
Magneto is in town with his teenagers Quicksilver and Scarlet Witch, who he brought into helping him in a sinister plot to steal the Infinity Fractals at the Vault for Doctor Doom. During the first fight, Falcon develops a crush on Scarlet Witch after she heals Redwing. Hulk's Transformation: Simpsons Hulk First appearances: Magneto, Quicksilver, Scarlet Witch
22	"The Ice Melt Cometh!"	Patty Shinagawa	Michael Ryan	X-Men #18	January 23, 2010	122
Doctor Doom sends his "Team Toxic" (consisting of Pyro, Trapster, and Zzzax) out to the North Pole to spin the Earth at high speeds in his latest plot to get the Infinity Fractals, only for Team Toxic to run afoul of Iron Man, Thor, and Wolverine. While Flatman and Reptil lecture about the polar ice caps, the world starts flooding after Trapster sets off the machine's self-destruct sequence and melts them. Now Iron Man must convince Iceman to help save the day. Hulk's Transformation: Grey Hulk First appearances: Flatman
23	"Wrath of the Red Skull!"	Michael R. Gerard	Mark Hoffmeier	Captain America #100	January 30, 2010	123
It's Captain America's birthday and all he wants to do is celebrate it with his fellow Super Hero Squad members and Nick Fury. To show his minions what real villainy is like, Doctor Doom thaws out the WWII villain Red Skull. Captain America is not pleased to find his old enemy up to his old tricks, and Doctor Doom is not thrilled about Red Skull's enormous ego. Hulk's Transformation: MODOH (Mental Organism Designed Only for Hulking) First appearances: Red Skull, Arnim Zola, Howling Commandos (Dum Dum Dugan, Gabe Jones, Izzy Cohen) Skullbots
24	"Mother of Doom!"	Patty Shinagawa	Eugene Son	The Avengers #187	February 6, 2010	124
Doctor Doom conquers Chthon's mystical dimension to free his mother Cynthia Von Doom (who changed her name to "Coco" because "Cynthia" is too drab). Though Doom ends up with Chthon's evil powers, he also finds himself dealing with his mother's monstrous nagging. Chthon comes to the Super Hero Squad and Doctor Strange for help. Meanwhile, Odin wants Thor to return to Asgard and orders him to handle his last-minute stuff on Earth before his time is up. Hulk's Transformation: Joe Fixit First appearances: Chthon, Cynthia Von Doom, Morgan le Fay
25	"Last Exit Before Doomsday!"	Michael R. Gerard	Matt Wayne	Fantastic Four #49	February 13, 2010	125
Silver Surfer's past as Galactus' herald is revealed as he encounters another herald, Stardust. But Doctor Doom has plans of his own for Stardust and her big boss. Hulk's Transformation: Mecha-Hulk First appearances: Galactus, Heralds of Galactus (Firelord, Stardust, Terrax)
26	"This Al Dente Earth!"	Patty Shinagawa	Matt Wayne	Fantastic Four #243	February 20, 2010	126
Galactus arrives in Super Hero City to devour the Earth. The fate of the planet hangs in the balance, but all of the city's heroes are powerless before Galactus. Now the Super Hero Squad must convince Doctor Doom to help reforge the Infinity Sword to help defeat Galactus. They finally do make it, but Silver Surfer is the only one who can wield it with his Cosmic Power. Reptil gives up his dinosaur powers (which were derived from a fossilized fractal), and the Silver Surfer becomes Galactus' herald again. Hulk's Transformation: Wolverine-Hulk First appearances: Thanos (the real one), Phil Sheldon from "Marvels"

=== Season 2: 2010–11 ===
No.	Title	Directed by	Written by	Title card's issue homage	Original release date	Prod. code
27	"Another Order of Evil, Part 1!"	Michael R. Gerard	Matt Wayne	The Avengers #92	October 23, 2010	201
When Captain Marvel goes missing during a peace conference between the Kree and the Skrulls, Ms. Marvel forces the Super Hero Squad to come together again to get to the bottom of the disappearance, unaware that Thanos is behind it. Meanwhile, Doctor Doom plans a prison break with Wrecker and Thunderball. First appearances: Captain Marvel, Anelle, Kree, S.H.I.E.L.D. Bots
28	"Another Order of Evil, Part 2!"	Patty Shinagawa	Matt Wayne	The Avengers #125	October 23, 2010	202
After the Super Hero Squad gets imprisoned by the Skrulls, Falcon's trump card, in the form of Scarlet Witch, is the only hope to stop the war between the Kree and the Skrulls and to defeat Thanos and his Soul Gem. First appearances: Adam Warlock (as an Infinity Gem)
29	"Support Your Local Sky-Father!"	Patty Shinagawa	Eugene Son	Thor #126	October 30, 2010	203
Jealous of the actions of Thor on Earth, Greek god Zeus challenges Odin to a battle between the god of Thunder and his son Hercules. Reptil sneaks along to help Thor out. Meanwhile, the Mayor of Super Hero City sends Invisible Woman to secretly broadcast the challenge for all of Super Hero City to see. First appearances: Hercules, Zeus, Power Pack (Alex Power, Julie Power, Jack Power, and Katie Power), Franklin Richards, Odin (full appearance)
30	"Villainy Redux Syndrome!"	Patty Shinagawa	Mark Hoffmeier	Fantastic Four #200	November 6, 2010	204
Slowly going insane in prison, Doctor Doom leads an escape plan where he distracts the Super Hero Squad using a Fin Fang Foom balloon, and must lead his former allies (and two new ones) to escape from the grasp of Captain America and Ms. Marvel. First appearances: Molecule Man, Volcana
31	"World War Witch!"	Michael R. Gerard	Nicole Dubuc	All Winners #19	November 13, 2010	205
A mishap between Thanos' new Time Gem and the Scarlet Witch's hex powers sends her back to World War II, where she must assist Captain America and the Invaders in stopping Red Skull from launching a rocket that will destroy Europe. First appearances: Invaders (Bucky Barnes, Human Torch, Toro), Ego the Living Planet
32	"Whom Continuity Would Destroy!"	Michael R. Gerard	Story: Matt Wayne; Teleplay: Stan Berkowitz	The Avengers #70	November 20, 2010	206
Thanos recruits Iron Man, Hulk, and the Scarlet Witch for a match against the Squadron Supreme of another dimension in a battle of heroes for the Grandmaster's Mind Gem. First appearances: Squadron Supreme (Nighthawk, Hyperion, Power Princess), Grandmaster
33	"Double Negation at the World's End!"	Patty Shinagawa	Eugene Son	Fantastic Four #109	November 27, 2010	207
After stealing the Space Gem from Thanos, Nebula seizes the Helicarrier's teleporter to escape. However, she accidentally transports herself, H.E.R.B.I.E., and Wolverine to the Negative Zone, where Annihilus attacks them, thinking they are after his Cosmic Control Rod. First appearances: Annihilus, Nebula, Firestar (as a picture)
34	"Alienating with the Surfer!"	Michael R. Gerard	Mark Hoffmeier	Fantastic Four #74	January 8, 2011	208
With Galactus attempting to eat the Skrull Throneworld and the Silver Surfer nowhere to be found, the Squad must hold off the devourer while finding their ally. Silver Surfer (who is slowly being corrupted by the Infinity Sword) turns out to have delayed Ronan the Accuser from coming to the Skrull Throneworld's aid. First appearances: Ronan the Accuser, Dro'ge
35	"Blind Rage Knows No Color!"	Michael R. Gerard	Jim Kreig	Fantastic Four #25	January 15, 2011	209
Thanos uses the Mind Gem to control Hulk who goes on a sleepwalking rampage. The Super Hero Squad must enter the dream realm to fight back, even if they have to get help from Nightmare. First appearances: Nightmare, Alicia Masters
36	"Lo, How the Mighty Hath Abdicated!"	Patty Shinagawa	Charlotte Fullerton	Journey Into Mystery #103	January 22, 2011	210
Enchantress places a love spell on Odin in an attempt to become queen of Asgard, but a forgotten rule forces him from the throne and makes Thor king instead, which both she and Loki try to take advantage of. Meanwhile, Magneto and Quicksilver discover that Wanda has joined the Super Hero Squad and hitch a ride to try and take her back from them. First appearances: Balder, Frigga
37	"So Pretty When They Explode!"	Michael R. Gerard	Len Wein	Nova #1	January 29, 2011	211
Thanos destroys the Nova Corps and takes Nova captive to get his hands on the Power Gem, leading Iron Man to recruit Hercules and She-Hulk to rescue him. Meanwhile, H.E.R.B.I.E. falls for Nova's messenger droid, Holoball. First appearances: Nova, She-Hulk, Ultron, Holoball, Thanos-Bots
38	"Too Many Wolverines!"	Patty Shinagawa	Eugene Son	Wolverine #1	February 5, 2011	212
An army of Wolverine clones invade Super Hero City, forcing the real Wolverine and Reptil to get to the source, with help from Firestar. Outside of the other Super Hero Squad members rounding up the Wolverine clones, Reptil is unaware that his science fair partner and Firestar are the same person. It soon turns out that Egghead is responsible for the Wolverine clones. First appearances: Firestar, Amadeus Cho, X-23
39	"Pedicure and Facial of Doom!"	Patty Shinagawa	Richard Pursel	Fantastic Four #84	February 12, 2011	213
Doctor Doom returns to Latveria in hopes to regroup, but discovers that his mother Coco is free from captivity, has brainwashed her captor Chthon, and has turned his castle into a day-spa trap that has ensnared the Super Hero Squad. First appearances: Hotel Employee Doombots
40	"Fate of Destiny!"	Michael R. Gerard	Story: Matt Wayne; Teleplay: Stan Berkowitz	Silver Surfer v2 #34	February 19, 2011	214
Thanos completes his Infinity Stone collection and the Super Hero Squad faces him in a final showdown for the fate of the universe. However, when requesting backup from one of their own, they encounter a betrayal that changes everything. First appearances: Adam Warlock (full appearance), Dark Surfer
41	"The Ballad of Beta Ray Bill! (Six Against Infinity, Part 1)"	Patty Shinagawa	Nicole Dubuc	Thor #337	July 23, 2011	215
After being thrown into a portal by Dark Surfer, Thor befriends Korbinite janitor Beta Ray Bill after being transported to his space station, and must give up Mjölnir to prove that he has excellent fighting skills. First appearances: Beta Ray Bill, Stranger
42	"Days, Nights, and Weekends of Future Past! (Six Against Infinity, Part 2)"	Michael R. Gerard	Eugene Son	X-Men #141	July 23, 2011	216
After being thrown into a portal by Dark Surfer, Falcon and H.E.R.B.I.E. find themselves in an alternate reality where Scarlet Witch is an evil empress who rules the world. With help from Magneto and Reptil, Falcon and H.E.R.B.I.E. try to convince Scarlet Witch that she is good and let the world be in peace. First appearances: Sentinels
43	"This Man-Thing, This Monster! (Six Against Infinity, Part 3)"	Patty Shinagawa	John Rozum	Tomb of Dracula #1	October 3, 2011	217
After being thrown into a portal by Dark Surfer, a powerless Iron Man finds himself stranded on a world of monsters. There, he meets Man-Thing and Werewolf by Night and battles Dracula and a gang of mummies led by N'Kantu, the Living Mummy. First appearances: Man-Thing, Werewolf by Night/Jack Russell, Dracula, N'Kantu, the Living Mummy, Doc Samson, Ellen Brandt
44	"The Devil Dinosaur You Say! (Six Against Infinity, Part 4)"	Michael R. Gerard	Eugene Son	Devil Dinosaur #1	October 4, 2011	218
After being thrown into a portal by Dark Surfer, Wolverine winds up on Dinosaur World (a world populated mainly by dinosaurs) and encounters the High Evolutionary who asks him to help Devil Dinosaur in exchange for helping to get Wolverine back to Earth. Meanwhile, the Mayor of Super Hero City attempts to negotiate with the Dark Surfer in the SHS' absence. First appearances: Moon-Boy, Devil Dinosaur, High Evolutionary
45	"Planet Hulk! (Six Against Infinity, Part 5)"	Patty Shinagawa	Jimmy Palmiotti	The Incredible Hulk #3	October 5, 2011	219
After being thrown into a portal by Dark Surfer, Hulk ends up on Sakaar and he is captured by the Red King for gladiator-themed tournament games. To escape the Red King's cruelty, Hulk teams up with two other gladiators: Miek and Korg. First appearances: Red King, Miek, Korg
46	"1602! (Six Against Infinity, Part 6)"	Michael R. Gerard	Eugene Son	The Avengers #104	October 6, 2011	220
After being thrown into a portal by Dark Surfer, Scarlet Witch ends up in the Marvel 1602 universe where she finds a town under attack by pirate versions of Doctor Doom, MODOK, and Abomination. Unfortunately for Scarlet Witch, the townspeople do not appreciate witches.
47	"Brouhaha at the World's Bottom!"	Patty Shinagawa	Stan Berkowitz	The Amazing Spider-Man #103	October 7, 2011	221
As Mister Fantastic and Ms. Marvel try to rescue the Squaddies from their extra-dimensional exile, Baron Strucker and his Hydra soldiers besiege their distant Antarctic outpost. To buy the two some time, Captain America teams up with Ka-Zar and Zabu to fight Hydra's forces. First appearances: Hydra, Baron Strucker
48	"Missing: Impossible!"	Michael R. Gerard	Tom Kenny & Eugene Son	Fantastic Four #11	October 10, 2011	222
When the Impossible Man's wife kicks him out, he ends up crashing with the Super Hero Squad. But to save his marriage, Impossible Man attempts to do something no one else has been able to do – defeat the Dark Surfer. First appearances: Impossible Man, Impossible Woman (Impossible Man's wife)
49	"Revenge of the Baby Sat!"	Patty Shinagawa	Eugene Son	X-Men Annual #10 (itself based on Giant-Size X-Men #1)	October 11, 2011	223
Attempting to go back in time to stop the Dark Surfer, the Super Hero Squad suffers a time mishap that transforms Iron Man, Scarlet Witch and Falcon into toddlers. While Wolverine and Hulk babysit the toddler heroes, Ms. Marvel, Thor and H.E.R.B.I.E. all head to the limbo in an attempt to find a way to fix everything. But things take a turn for the worse when Dr. Doom enters the limbo and turns both Ms. Marvel and Thor into seniors. Now, H.E.R.B.I.E. must use the controls in the Time Tower to fix the affected Super Hero Squad members, while Wolverine, Hulk, and the three toddler heroes, all meet up with everyone in the limbo to join in the battle. First appearances: Space Phantom
50	"Soul Stone Picnic!"	Michael R. Gerard	Charlotte Fullerton	Ms. Marvel #1	October 12, 2011	224
Ms. Marvel leads the Squaddies on a mission to rescue her namesake Captain Marvel from the Dark Surfer. But when the fight traps the Squaddies in the Soul Stone, it's Captain Marvel who performs the ultimate sacrifice.
51	"When Strikes the Surfer!"	Patty Shinagawa	Stan Berkowitz	The Infinity Gauntlet #6	October 13, 2011	225
As the Dark Surfer prepares to end the universe, Ms. Marvel reveals a secret that could finally bring down the Infinity Gauntlet. Meanwhile, Doctor Doom prepares one final measure to try and stop the Dark Surfer with his own villainous team.
52	"The Final Battle! ('Nuff Said!)"	Michael R. Gerard	Nicole Dubuc	The Infinity Gauntlet #1	October 14, 2011	226
The Six Squaddies must each face the Dark Surfer one-on-one, in a final battle for the fate of reality that takes them to the edge of the universe— and a last stand at the cosmic Infinity Pool that brings everything full circle.
