= Tricephalous (comics) =

- Tricephalous as depicted in Marvel Universe #4 (September 1998). Art by Mike Manley.

Publication information
- Publisher: Marvel Comics
- First appearance: Fantastic Four #1 (November 1961)
- Created by: Stan Lee; Jack Kirby

In-story information
- Species: Deviant mutate
- Team affiliations: Deviants
- Abilities: Superhuman strength; Flight; Fire breath

Tricephalous is a fictional three-headed monster appearing in American comic books published by Marvel Comics.

== Publication history ==
Tricephalous first appeared in Fantastic Four #1 and was created by Stan Lee and Jack Kirby.

== Fictional character biography ==
Tricephalous is a three-headed creature who was created on Monster Island by the Deviants under the command of Kro. When Monster Island is attacked by Monster Hunters, Kro has Tricephalous attack while Kro escapes. Though much of Monster Island is destroyed, Tricephalous became a servant of the Mole Man.

When the Fantastic Four arrive on Monster Island, Tricephalous tries to stop them. However, it is caught off guard and defeated.

A Skrull named De'Lila arrives looking for the Inorganic Technodrome and takes over Tricephalous and the other monsters, causing them to go on a rampage. When De'Lila is defeated, Tricephalous and the other monsters return to Monster Island with the Punisher on their trail. However, he abandons the chase after seeing the Fantastic Four.

To prevent the Fantastic Four from preventing him in his plan to create a pocket dimension, Aron summons Mole Man, Giganto, and Tricephalous to fight them. Thing defeats Tricephalous by grabbing his necks and throwing him into Super-Skrull.

Mole Man later sends Tricephalous and the other monsters to attack Manhattan. The Fantastic Four halt their attack by using Pym Particles to shrink the monsters, causing them to retreat.

In The Immortal Hulk (2020), Roxxon acquires Tricephalous and uses it to wreak havoc in Arizona. However, Tricephalous is driven off by Rick Jones, who destroys its middle head. Tricephalous later appears in Fantastic Four (2024), where it is revealed to have regenerated its body.

== Powers and abilities ==
Each of Tricephalous' three heads can spew fire from their mouths. The wings on its back enable it to fly.

== Other versions ==
Tricephalous appears in JLA/Avengers #1.

== In other media ==
Tricephalous appears in The Super Hero Squad Show, with vocal effects provided by Ted Biaselli.
