= Marvel Super Hero Squad: Comic Combat =

2011 video game

- Developer: Griptonite Games
- Publisher: THQ
- Composer: Mick Gordon
- Series: Marvel Super Hero Squad
- Platforms: Wii, PlayStation 3, Xbox 360
- Release: NA: November 15, 2011; AU: November 17, 2011; EU: November 18, 2011
- Genres: Fighting, beat 'em up
- Mode: Single-player

Marvel Super Hero Squad: Comic Combat is a video game that uses the uDraw GameTablet, developed by Griptonite Games, and published by THQ. The game is the third in the Marvel Super Hero Squad franchise, acting as the sequel to two video games Marvel Super Hero Squad and Marvel Super Hero Squad: The Infinity Gauntlet. It was released on November 15, 2011, for the PlayStation 3, Xbox 360, and Wii game systems.

Based on characters from Marvel comic books such as Thor and Iron Man, Marvel Super Hero Squad: Comic Combat revolves around Doctor Doom and his evil minions planning to find a way into the real world to steal the Tablet and use it to take over the comic book universe.

== Gameplay ==
Four squad members (from left to right) Iron Man, Hulk, Thor and Falcon

Designed to be played with the uDraw GameTablet, the tablet helps players with attacks, weapons and barricades. Players use the stylus pen to draw their own attacks to stop Doom and his evil cohorts.

Players choose from 10 "Squaddies" based on characters from Marvel comic books, including Iron Man, Thor, Hulk, Wolverine, Falcon, Scarlet Witch, Reptil, Captain America, Invisible Woman, and Squirrel Girl. Players also solve unique puzzles using the tablet to defeat Doctor Doom. Major Marvel Comics antagonists such as MODOK, Abomination, and Red Skull are the main villains of Comic Combat.

Featured locations include the S.H.I.E.L.D. Helicarrier, the Baxter Building, the Vault, and the Sanctum Sanctorum. Shaking the uDraw GameTablet will cause a massive in-game earthquake. The game includes a total of six comic book-designed stages and additionally players can earn "hero points", that can be used to upgrade characters.
