= Giganto =

Marvel Comics supervillain

Giganto (/dʒaɪˈɡæntoʊ/) is the name of two monsters appearing in American comic books published by Marvel Comics, primarily as enemies of the Fantastic Four.

== Publication history ==
The Deviant Mutate version of Giganto was first seen in Fantastic Four #1 and was created by Stan Lee and Jack Kirby.

== Fictional character biographies ==
Giganto
- Giganto makes his first appearance battling the Fantastic Four as seen on the cover of Fantastic Four #1.

Publication information
- Publisher: Marvel Comics
- First appearance: Fantastic Four #1 (Nov. 1961)
- Created by: Stan Lee; Jack Kirby

In-story information
- Species: Deviant mutate
- Partnerships: Inorganic Technodrones; Kro; Mole Man
- Abilities: Superhuman strength and durability; Underground digging; Enhanced lung capacity

=== Giganto (Deviant Mutate) ===
The first Giganto seen is a mutate created by Deviant scientists to serve as part of Kro's invasion force. After monster hunters force Kro to leave Monster Island, Giganto and the other Deviant Mutates find a new master known as the Mole Man, living with him in Subterranea.

The Mole Man unleashes Giganto upon the surface world to attack and destroy chemical plants in the Soviet Union, Australia, South America, and Africa. This attracts the attention of the Fantastic Four, who head to Monster Island. The Mole Man unleashes Giganto upon them until it is repelled by the Human Torch's attacks.

When Mole Man learns that millionaire Alden Maas had destroyed part of his underground kingdom while trying to reach the Earth's core, Mole Man unleashes Giganto upon Maas' facilities while he works with Human Torch and Thing to battle Maas himself. Maas dies before they arrive, which denies Mole Man vengeance.

When Mole Man believes that the Avengers were the ones responsible for destroying part of his kingdom, he unleashes Giganto and other mutates to attack Los Angeles. Iron Man intercepts Giganto and throws him into the sea while he and U.S. Agent try to decide what to do with it. Wonder Man convinces Mole Man that the Avengers were not responsible, which causes him to recall his monsters.

A Skrull named De'Lila brainwashes Giganto and the rest of Mole Man's monsters, sending Giganto as a diversion while she searches for the lost Inorganic Technodrone. The Technodrone is found by Giganto's mate, who imprints on it and accepts it as if it were her own child.

During his labors for the reality series "The New Labors of Hercules", Hercules is sent to capture Giganto as a reimagining of his labor to capture the man-eating mares of King Diomedes. Hercules uses an enormous chain to snare Giganto, then swing him at Giganto's brothers.

Alongside Frankencastle, Morbius, and other monsters, Giganto helps repel an attack by a squad of Japanese monster hunters who are attempting to exterminate all of Earth's monsters.

Giganto
- The Sub-Mariner summons a Giganto with the Proteus Horn as seen on the cover of Namor the Sub-Mariner #13

Publication information
- Publisher: Marvel Comics
- First appearance: Fantastic Four #4 (May 1962)
- Created by: Stan Lee; Jack Kirby

In-story information
- Species: Terrestrial animals
- Partnerships: Namor
- Notable aliases: Moby Dick "Monstro"
- Abilities: Superhuman strength and durability; Reactive adaptation; Water blasts

=== Giganto (Atlantean beasts) ===
Giganto is the name of several Atlantean creatures resembling whales. Their origins are unknown, but are said to have been genetically engineered by the Deviants. They sleep on the ocean floor until they are summoned by whoever blows the Horn of Proteus.

When Prince Namor believes that the surface world is destroying Atlantis, he uses the Horn of Proteus to awaken Giganto. Mister Fantastic attempts to slow Giganto down with a smokescreen emitted by the Fantasticar, but is forced to withdraw when the Human Torch attempts to help and has his flame extinguished by Giganto's blowhole attack. The Thing enters Giganto's mouth to plant a bomb, with Giganto being killed in the resulting explosion.

Doctor Doom has one of his servants steal the Horn of Proteus, awakening a larger Giganto and a number of sea monsters to attack a New England town. Mister Fantastic and Iron Man attach a sonic generator on it causing the sea monsters to return to the sea.

In a plot to assist the Human Torch and Anne Raymond, Namor disguises himself as the Mad Thinker and releases a robot version of Giganto. The robot is destroyed by the Human Torch.

Namor sends Giganto and other sea monsters to an uncharted island to prevent anyone from interfering with the honeymoon of Ororo Munroe and T'Challa.

== Powers and abilities ==
Both versions of Giganto are amphibious and possess immense strength and durability. The Atlantean Beast version of Giganto can shoot water from its blowhole.

== Other versions ==
- In the "House of M" storyline, the Deviant mutate version of Giganto was killed by Doctor Doom's Fearsome Four.
- A Marvel 1602 version of the Atlantean Giganto appears in 1602: Fantastick Four #3, guarding the island of Belasyum.
- A Marvel 2099 version of the Atlantean Giganto appears in Spider-Man 2099, where it is controlled by Roman the Sub-Mariner.

== In other media ==
=== Television ===
- Giganto appears in the Fantastic Four (1967) episode "Demon in the Deep". This version is an ordinary whale enhanced by the villain Gamma Ray.
- Both versions of Giganto appear in Fantastic Four: World's Greatest Heroes.
- The Atlantean Beast incarnation of Giganto appears in the Avengers Assemble episode "Beneath the Surface".

=== Film ===
The Deviant incarnation of Giganto appears in The Fantastic Four: First Steps.

=== Video games ===
- The Deviate incarnation of Giganto appears in Fantastic Four (1997).
- The Deviate incarnation of Giganto appears in Marvel Heroes.
- The Atlantean Beast incarnation of Giganto appears in Marvel Rivals.
- The Deviate incarnation of Giganto appears in Marvel Snap.
- Giganto appears in Marvel Contest of Champions.
