= Mole Man =

Marvel Comics fictional character

- Mole Man taken from a pin-up from Fantastic Four Annual #1 (September 1963); Art by Jack Kirby.

Publication information
- Publisher: Marvel Comics
- First appearance: The Fantastic Four #1 (November 1961)
- Created by: Stan Lee; Jack Kirby

In-story information
- Alter ego: Harvey Rupert Elder
- Species: Human
- Team affiliations: Subterranea; Outcasts; Lethal Legion
- Partnerships: Kala
- Notable aliases: Dr. Arthur Molekevic
- Abilities: Genius-level intellect; Radar sense; Staff proficiency

The Mole Man (Harvey Rupert Elder) is a supervillain appearing in American comic books published by Marvel Comics. He is depicted as a recurring foe of the Fantastic Four and was the first villain they ever faced. His schemes usually consist of trying to rule the surface of the Earth with the aid of his "Moloids", mole-human hybrids over whom he rules.

Mole Man has had numerous appearances in other media, usually on television and video games. Jack DeLeon, Gregg Berger, Paul Dobson, Ted Biaselli, and David H. Lawrence XVII have voiced the character in animation. The character appears in the Marvel Cinematic Universe film The Fantastic Four: First Steps (2025), portrayed by Paul Walter Hauser.

== Publication history ==
Created by artist Jack Kirby and writer Stan Lee, the character first appeared in The Fantastic Four #1 (Nov. 1961). The character's name was at the time spelled "Moleman" in one word. The spelling "Mole Man" came in The Fantastic Four #22 (Jan. 1964).

== Fictional character biography ==
The Mole Man was originally Harvey Rupert Elder, an American nuclear engineer and explorer. Elder was socially shunned due to a combination of his abrasive personality and his homely dwarfish appearance. Furthermore, his fellow explorers ridiculed him for his eccentric, crackpot theories regarding a Hollow Earth. In 1956, while following the group of explorers called the Monster Hunters, he stumbled upon Monster Isle, which was at the time a base of the Deviant warlord Kro.

When Elder fell into a massive cave leading deep into the underground realm of Subterranea, he decided his theories had finally been vindicated. However, his eyes were permanently damaged when he gazed directly upon a reflective deposit of diamonds. Partially blind and secluded from the surface world, Elder dubbed himself the Mole Man and began exploring his new home. He eventually became the ruler of the branch of Subterraneans now known as the Moloids, and the ruler of much of Subterranea and the caverns of Monster Isle. He used the Deviant-derived creatures and technology that he found in Subterranea to strike back at the outer world in numerous attempts to rule or humble the world that had rejected him.

The Mole Man conducted attacks on the surface world by destroying nuclear power plants in the Eastern Bloc, Australia, South America, and French Equatorial Africa, attracting the attention of the newly formed Fantastic Four in their first adventure. After the group arrived on Monster Isle, he captured Mister Fantastic and the Human Torch and told them his plans to invade every major urban area on the planet via a network of tunnels. When he released a horde of monsters the Human Torch sealed his realm's entrance. The Mole Man appeared to have destroyed Monster Isle in an atomic blast. The Mole Man's Deviant-bred monstrous mutates, collectively known as the "Mole Man's Monsters", include Tricephalous, Megataur, and a flying bird-insect creature known only as "Skreeal". The Mole Man also has a group of superhuman allies called the Outcasts.

The Mole Man later stole buildings from New York City, but was thwarted by the Fantastic Four and appeared to be killed in an explosion. With the Red Ghost, he next battled the Avengers and tried to use a machine that caused earthquakes to take over the world by threatening to destroy all life on Earth, capturing Giant-Man who had been warned by ants of the earthquakes as they sensed them first. Later the Wasp released Giant-Man and he shrunk down to ant-size and sabotaged the machine. Iron Man then sealed the tunnel entrances. The Red Ghost then broke up the partnership. Mole Man was among the criminals later assembled by Doctor Doom's mind-control device to attack Reed and Sue's wedding. Mole Man then fought a war against rival Subterranean ruler Tyrannus, capturing the Fountain of Youth which allowed Tyrannus to stay young. Tyrannus teleported the Hulk underground to help him regain the Fountain. Finally, he was able to restore himself. Mole Man used the original X-Men as pawns in his war against Tyrannus. The Mole Man later trapped the Fantastic Four in a house of his own creation that temporarily blinded them. Mole Man continued to fight his war with Tyrannus.

He later teamed with Kala, the queen of the Subterranean Netherworlders, and fell in love with her. He plotted to destroy the surface world, but was betrayed by Kala and Tyrannus. Some time later, Mole Man and Kala were betrothed to be married. Namor, the Atlantean prince, helped out the Moloids when a conquering force was slaughtering many, while using the rest of them for slave labor.

Much later, Mole Man befriended the Thing and then plotted to raise a new continent at the cost of sinking California, but was again thwarted by the Fantastic Four. He was captured by Lava Men later. Mole Man then attempted to bring peace to Subterranea, but was attacked by Fantastic Four clones. He contended with Skrulls and tried unsuccessfully to capture a Skrull technotroid egg.

Mole Man later allied with Grotesk and Tyrannus against Deviants led by Brutus. He aided the Hulk in fighting Brutus's Deviants. Together with his allies, he triumphed over Brutus, and welcomed back Kala as his consort.

Mole Man became involved with the West Coast Avengers when one of his monsters attacked Los Angeles. His Moloids were caught in the middle of a Skrull revenge scheme on the Fantastic Four. A replacement Fantastic Four, consisting of Spider-Man, Ghost Rider, the Hulk and Wolverine were tricked into entering the Mole Man's territory and battling his forces.

He later battled the West Coast Avengers along with the U-Foes during the Acts of Vengeance, but their attempts met with failure.

Later, he surrendered his desire for conquest and revenge and began assembling a sanctuary for others who had been rejected by the surface world. His two attempts to do so led to the deaths of most of the visitors to his sanctuaries. Briefly, the Mole Man allowed Adam Warlock's superhero team, the Infinity Watch, to use Monster Isle (more specifically, a castle located on its grounds) as a base, on the reasoning that they could help protect him from any meddlers, which they did on several occasions. They proved helpful when the United Nations invaded the island. The Watch, primarily Gamora, drove away the invading force with an absolute minimum of harm. The Avengers assisted with the United Nations, then recognized the Mole Man's rulership over the island.

Mole Man tended to keep out of the way when the cosmic plans went on. The Watch occupied the Monster Isle castle until their dissolution as a team. Following their departure, the Mole Man apparently returned to his solitary, vengeful existence. Aside from occasional fits of hostility, he seems for the most part content to rule his subterranean kingdom, and for the past few years his surface activities have mostly been limited to reacting to threats (real or imagined) to his people.

In one incident, he was causing property damage purely to help the Moloids, whose water and food had become polluted. He appeared in The Mighty Avengers having led an attack on New York, claiming retaliation for his underground home, which he says is destroyed. He was humiliated by a female-formed Ultron, who destroyed his remaining monsters, and he was arrested.

Mole Man was also behind a series of Chupacabra attacks in Puerto Rico. His motive was to protect the blood-drinking race from extinction. He was defeated by the Fantastic Four.

In the "Live Fast" story arc of Runaways, the Runaways are fighting a huge tall sky-scraper sized monster. When Victor Mancha suggests Nico Minoru shrink it, Nico mentions she already used that spell on Mole Man.

Mole Man witnessed the return of the Hulk, which pleased him. However, when the Hulk was defeated and his stone ship destroyed, various creatures from planet Sakaar were released into the underground. Mole Man trained the alien beasts and led them to attack New York once more. However, the creatures were really waiting for the arrival of Hulk's son Skaar. During this time, Tyrannus rose to challenge Mole Man's claim and used magic to pervert the aliens so that they could destroy the surface. Skaar went into a berserker rage and thus both Tyrannus and Mole Man fled.

Mandarin's White Light Ring approached Mole Man to help it and the other rings have revenge on Tony Stark where he became Mandarin-Six. Mole Man and the other Mandarins later traveled to Svartalfheim to confront Malekith the Accursed, who had hunted down other three Mandarins and had taken their rings from them. The Mandarins thwarted any attempt of Malekith to hide or flee, as the rings could locate each other. Malekith made a pact with Iron Man (who was also at the time in Svartalfheim to retrieve the rings) disposed of his ring and escaped to safely, as he could no longer be tracked. Following their failure to kill Malekith, the Mandarins resumed their own paths. The Mandarins joined forces once more to help Mole Man's plan to create ring-powered weapons with which destroy cities from their base in Sinister London. A test was thwarted by the Fantastic Four. Before they could release one of the actual machines, Iron Man pinned them down along with the Trojan Guard and Abigail Burns. The Mandarins failed to escape as Iron Man's ally Dark Angel used magic to prevent them from teleporting. After the other Mandarins are defeated, Mole Man's ring declared him the Prime-Mandarin. Instead, Mole Man abandoned his ring and retreated.

Mole Man was later contacted by unknown individuals to bring them Athol Kussar, the half-brother of mine owner Faust Swart who laundered money to fund Hydra's African base after he knew about his half-brother's actions and had been previously imprisoned in a mine by Swart while evading the S.H.I.E.L.D. agents. When Mole Man broke into Kussar's cell, Kussar did not want to leave due to a bomb inside his body that would detonate if he left his cell. Mole Man was attacked and knocked down by Invisible Woman who disposed of the bomb and placed Kussar in S.H.I.E.L.D. custody.

In "All-New, All-Different Marvel", Mole Man and his fellow Subterraneans ended up in a civil war with the Subterraneans that are on the side of his son Mole Monster.

When Squirrel Girl's friends Nancy, Tippy-Toe, and Koi Boi, help set her up an online dating profile, it leads to many unsuccessful dates, one of which ends with an encounter with Mole Man, who is angered by how Doreen's earlier suggestions to Kraven has affected his home. Doreen apologizes to him and the two have a conversation about his situation, leading Mole Man to proposing to Doreen on the spot and a number of follow-up schemes to get Doreen to go on a date with him. He threatens to bury a number of worldwide landmarks if she does not date him, and after Nancy is nearly kidnapped by him and being swarmed by the media, she goes to confront Mole Man only to find that Tricephalous is in love with him. She lets Tricephalous defeat her to woo Mole Man and they leave for good.

Mole Man later appears attacking New York with a group of monsters, but he is defeated by Amadeus Cho, Moon Girl, and Devil Dinosaur.

During the Secret Empire storyline, it is revealed that Mole Man struck a deal with Captain America to use the tunnels of his subterranean kingdom for his smuggling operation in exchange for specific items from the surface world such as DVDs. When Captain America arrives with the resistance, Mole Man's kingdom is attacked by Dreadnoughts sent by Hydra. Though the heroes defeat the Dreadnoughts, Mole Man ends his truce with Captain America and lets the heroes leave.

It was revealed that Mole Man has spurned Kala's affection which led to her as Mole Woman taking some Moloids, some Subterranean monsters, and some of Mole Man's weapons in order to prevent Thing and Alicia Masters' wedding. Amidst Mole Woman's fight with Invisible Woman and She-Hulk, Mole Man showed up and broke up the fight. He gave Invisible Woman some diamonds for a wedding gift and told Kala that he wanted nothing to do with her as obsession is not the same thing as love.

== Powers and abilities ==
The Mole Man has no true superhuman abilities. He is an extraordinary genius, with knowledge of technology centuries beyond conventional science. He was able to master alien principles of technology totally foreign to his culture and environment. Due to his poor eyesight, his senses have naturally compensated to the degree that they are, like those of Daredevil, heightened to nearly superhuman levels.

The Mole Man is extremely near-sighted due to damage to his vision from years ago, and his eyes are extremely sensitive to bright light. He is virtually blinded by normal illumination. To counter this, he wears protective glasses (an early version of a nuclear weapons test Range Officer's flash-goggles) that both reduce bright light to levels his weak eyes can tolerate and increase dim light to levels by which he can see. His sense of hearing, smell, and touch are far more sensitive than that of a normal human; these senses are heightened, but not superhuman. He possesses a "radar sense" that supplements his own weak natural vision.

Mole Man's life has made him an expert on subterranean geography, spelunking, understanding Deviant weapons systems, and monster training. He has mastered the principles underlying Deviant technology that he discovered in Subterranea and has made radical improvements upon much of it.

=== Equipment ===
The Mole Man fights with a staff and has developed a fighting style that resembles bōjutsu; despite his small size and relative weakness he is a highly proficient hand-to-hand combatant when armed with his staff. He also commands an army of monsters and a branch of the Subterraneans known as Moloids that are absolutely loyal to him.

Mole Man has a series of similar-looking staves (6 feet long, made of wood or aluminum), designed by the Mad Thinker, which contain built-in weapons and additional features. Among such weaponry are an electrical blaster, a flame-thrower, a vibro-charge blaster, and a laser cannon. All the staffs appear to have a low-energy radar. All staves are booby-trapped with a galvanic response meter that is tuned solely to the Mole Man's skin conductivity; this prevents anyone else from activating his staves.

== Other versions ==
=== Exiles ===
An alternate universe version of the Mole Man, simply called Harvey, appears in Exiles #10. This version comes from an Earth that was dominated by the Skrulls.

=== Heroes Reborn ===
An alternate universe version of the Mole Man from a pocket dimension created by Franklin Richards appears in Heroes Reborn.

=== Mutant X ===
An alternate universe version of the Mole Man from Earth-1298 appears in Mutant X #9. This version is in relationship with Callisto.

=== Fantastic Four: Season One ===
A modernized, alternate universe version of the Mole Man appears in Fantastic Four: Season One. This version was talked down amidst his first attack on New York and subsequently hired by Reed Richards and Sue Storm to become part of the former's business empire.

=== House of M ===
An alternate universe version of the Mole Man from Earth-58163 called the Mole King appears in Fantastic Four: House of M #1.

=== Marvel Zombies ===
A zombified alternate universe version of the Mole Man from Earth-2149 appears in Marvel Zombies.

=== The Amazing Spider-Man (1977) ===
An alternate universe version of the Mole Man named Melvin Kurtzman from Earth-77013 appears in The Amazing Spider-Man (1977).

=== Ultimate Marvel ===
An alternate universe version of the Mole Man from Earth-1610 appears in Ultimate Fantastic Four. This version is Arthur Molekevic, a former Baxter Foundation scientist who genetically-engineered the Moloids.

=== Ultimate Universe ===
An alternate universe version of the Mole Man from Earth-6160 appears in Ultimate Spider-Man (vol. 3). This version is a lieutenant and friend of Wilson Fisk and a member of his Sinister Six who controls New York City's underground and Subterranea on his behalf. Additionally, Subterranea is implied to be a part of the Savage Land that was spared from the devastation that Roxxon caused.

== In other media ==
=== Television ===
- Mole Man appears in The Marvel Super Heroes, voiced by Paul Kligman.
- Mole Man appears in Fantastic Four (1967), voiced by Jack DeLeon.
- Mole Man appears in a self-titled episode of Fantastic Four (1978), voiced by Ted Cassidy.
- Mole Man appears in a self-titled episode of Fantastic Four (1994), voiced by Gregg Berger.
- Mole Man appears in Fantastic Four: World's Greatest Heroes, voiced by Paul Dobson.
- Mole Man appears in The Super Hero Squad Show, voiced by Ted Biaselli. This version is a member of Doctor Doom's Lethal Legion who has intestinal gas problems while above ground.
- Mole Man appears in the Hulk and the Agents of S.M.A.S.H. episode "Of Moles and Men", voiced by David H. Lawrence XVII.

=== Film ===
- Mole Man was intended to appear in the officially unreleased 1994 film The Fantastic Four, portrayed by Ian Trigger, but the character's name was changed to the Jeweler due to co-executive producer Bernd Eichinger not having the rights to the character.
- Dr. Harvey Allen appears in Fantastic Four (2015), portrayed by Tim Blake Nelson. This version is a scientist and supervisor of the Baxter Foundation who oversaw Franklin Storm's experiments into interdimensional travel and is later killed by Victor von Doom. Prior to re-shoots, the character was supposed to be Harvey Elder, who would have become Mole Man.
- Mole Man appears in The Fantastic Four: First Steps (2025), portrayed by Paul Walter Hauser. This version is a former enemy of the Fantastic Four.

=== Video games ===
- Mole Man appears in Fantastic Four (2005), voiced by Barry Dennen.
- Mole Man appears in Marvel Super Hero Squad, voiced again by Ted Biaselli.
- Mole Man appears in Marvel Super Hero Squad Online, voiced again by Ted Biaselli.
- Mole Man appears as a boss in Marvel Heroes, voiced by Roger Rose.
- Mole Man appears in Pinball FX 2 as part of the Fantastic Four table.
- Mole Man appears in Marvel Snap.

=== Miscellaneous ===
Mole Man appears in the syndicated comic strip Scary Gary.
