= Deviant (comics) =

Fictional comic book race of humanoids

Deviants
- The Deviants in Thor & Hercules: Encyclopædia Mythologica #1 (Sept. 2009). Art by Kevin Sharpe.

Publication information
- Publisher: Marvel Comics
- First appearance: The Eternals #1 (July 1976)
- Created by: Jack Kirby

Characteristics
- Place of origin: Earth, Lemuria
- Notable members: See Citizen

In the Marvel Universe, the Deviants are the end product of a series of DNA tests known as Homo descendus, created by the enigmatic alien Celestials. Their race is largely insensitive and they view all other species as a threat. They even distrust each other and often get in their own way.

== Publication history ==
The Deviants first appeared in The Eternals #1 (July 1976).

== Fictional history ==
They are an offshoot of the evolutionary process that created sentient life on Earth instigated by the alien Celestials, and wage war against their counterparts, the Eternals. While the Eternals are humanoid, the Deviants are generally monstrous, with each Deviant possessing a unique mutation. Extremely mutated or deformed Deviants are referred to as "mutates", with some Deviant mutates inspiring the monsters of myth and legend.

The Deviants are religious, revering the Dreaming Celestial ("He Who Sleeps in Darkness"). They credit him with their creation and claim that he granted them dominion over the Earth, an agreement they believe was later broken by the treachery of the other Celestials. They have one or more holy books—the only one named thus far being the Book of Krask.

In the advent of the heroic age, Brother Tode is the leader of the Deviants. The Deviants' aristocracy, led by Tode, attack Olympia and kidnapped the Eternals with the intent to disintegrate them. However, Iron Man rescues the Eternals and helps them defeat the Deviants. The Eternals transform the Deviants' aristocracy into a synthetic cube, killing them. Without the aristocracy, the Deviants' priests seize power, led by Ghaur. Kro returns to Lemuria and becomes the leader of the Deviants.

== Membership ==
=== Deviants ===
- Kro – A Deviant warlord who is the ruler of Lemuria and head of the Delta Network. Kro is a long-lived shapeshifter.
- Ahqlau – Conspirator and friend of Yrdisis who posed as an ally of Kro, but was actually spying on him for Ghaur.
- Argos the Hunter – Member of the Sword of Damocles. Argos wields a cosmic energy staff.
- Broop – A jester working for Brother Tode.
- Brother Tode – The monarch and former ruler of Lemuria. He was killed by molecular reassembly by the Eternals.
- Brother Visara – A charismatic leader who led the Deviants in a revolution against all forms of leadership. He was killed by the other Deviants for his hypocrisy.
- Chudar – A horned, red-skinned Deviant who attends to Kro.
- Coal – A Deviant who was sent by Ghaur to retrieve the Proteus Horn.
- Darg – A pink-skinned Deviant who observed a gladiatorial match involving the Avengers. He had his sword stolen by Black Knight.
- Dark Angel/Tzabaoth (Donald and Deborah Ritter) – The twin children of Thena and Kro and members of the Delta Network.
- Dragona – A member of the Delta Force; sister of Ereshkigal and former lover of Brother Tode. Dragona is able to fly and breathe fire.
- Dulpus – The former leader of a group who attempted to assist in the takeover of Earth to gain favor from Kang the Conqueror. He sent Glomm into single combat against Warbird.
- Enigmo – Member of Delta Force and former gladiator. He is not to be confused with Cataphrax, who wrestled under the name Enigmo (see Deviant Mutates, below)
- Ereshkigal – The sister of Dragona who was mistaken in the past for Hecate. She apparently committed suicide after losing a contest against the Living Tribunal.
- Fascit – He was in charge of the operation to transform Margo Damian into a Deviant.
- Finn – Member of the Damocles Foundation who received the Celestial's Gatherer from Lucas Guthrie. He was killed when the Gatherer went on a rampage.
- Frathag – A Deviant priest. He was killed by an angry mob of Deviants when Kro exposed "purity time" as a falsehood.
- Gelt – A tentacle-armed Deviant who worshipped the Dreaming Celestial.
- General Dasrax – Dasrax is a member of Kro's conspiracy against the priesthood until Ghaur forces him to kill himself.
- Ghaur – The priest-lord of Lemuria who aspired to steal the power of the Dreaming Celestial. He usually competes with Kro for the leadership of the Deviants.
- Haag – A Deviant who advocated the Slicer following the rule of Brutus.
- Ignatz – A small, winged Deviant who served as the flying steed of Ant-Man.
- Jorro – A weapons maker and unwilling servant of Terminus.
- Karygmax – A priest who ordered Cataphrax to submit to purity time. Karygmax was involved in the resurrection of Ghaur. His current whereabouts are unknown.
- Kra – A large, winged Deviant who commanded a massive Deviant army.
- Nuncio Klarheit – A priest-lord who served Ghaur and accompanied Kro to the Pyramid of Winds to recover a vial and transported it back to Lemuria.
- Lugner – A Deviant who spied on Kro for Ghaur by posing as his assistant (although Kro was aware of his true nature). Lugner's current whereabouts are unknown.
- Maelstrom – A Deviant-Inhuman hybrid who is the son of Morga and Phaeder.
- Marcelus – Member of the Damocles Foundation. He was dispatched to Brazil to capture the Black Queen, but she turned him into stone.
- Medula – Partner of Maelstrom and mother of Ransak the Reject. Her current whereabouts are unknown.
- Morga – Partner of Phaeder and the mother of Maelstrom. She was killed by the other Deviants for looking too human-like.
- Morjak – A Deviant exhibiting a second face on his torso. He worshipped the Dreaming Celestial.
- Odysseus Indigo – The CEO of Damocles Foundation. He is able to hypnotize others or nullify super-powers.
- Plokohrel – A famous artist from 100th dynasty.
- Phraug – The former ruler of Lemuria. He was killed during the sinking of Atlantis.
- Pyre – A Deviant who is a member of the Sword of Damocles. Pyre possesses fire powers.
- Queen Vira – Queen of the Deviants. She was transformed into inert matter and merged with others of Deviant population into a cube by Eternals. She is currently deceased.
- Ragar – The Prime Minister who held contempt for Kro. He is currently trapped inside the Deviant cube by the Eternals.
- Ranar – A government official who is the son of Brother Tode. He was killed by the priesthood.
- Randy Lee Watson – Real name unknown. He worked for the Damocles Foundation. Watson enlisted the aid of Lucas Guthrie in capturing a Celestial Gatherer, but died when a guard shot him.
- Ransak the Reject – A gladiator who is an ally to the Eternals and a pupil of Kingo Sunen. He is an outcast as he looks like a human.
- Shelmar – A warrior and former gunner aboard Kro's flagship. His current whereabouts are unknown.
- Sledge – A Deviant who was initially thought to be a mutant. Sledge enhanced Blob and Mimic's powers. He is an associate of Risque and a favor broker.
- Sluice – An administrator who is part of Brother Tode's council, disliked Kro, presumably part of the group merged into a solid cube by the Eternals.
- Spike – He was sent by Ghaur to retrieve the Proteus Horn and was mistaken for one of the New Mutants by Namorita.
- Stranglehold – A member of the Sword of Damocles who pursued Arcadia and Ulysses. He possesses superhuman strength.
- Stra'an –
- String – sent by Ghaur to retrieve the Proteus Horn, mistaken for Warlock by Namorita
- Taras Vol – A Lemurian who was captured and mutated by Cole, Gort, and One-Eye. He was killed during the Great Cataclysm (AKA the Sinking of Atlantis).
- Thunder – A Deviant who impersonated the Incan thunder god Catequil in the Andes Mountains.
- Tobias – A Deviant who attempted to kill a Deviant child for being a mutate, but it was rescued by Dragona. His current whereabouts are unknown.
- El Toro Rojo – A renegade fighter and Delta Network member. He was bonded to Tupac Amaru, an autistic child.
- Ulysses Dragonblood – The brother of Odysseus Indigo and former member of the Damocles Foundation. He is able to sedate others with a touch.
- Veeg – Also known as Veerg, he is a member of the Damocles Foundation. Veeg secretly aided Sledge, Ulysses Dragonblood, Arcadia Deville, and X-Force in entering the Foundation's Amazon headquarters using the teleportation devices there.
- Weller – Member of the Damocles Foundation who received the Celestial Gatherer from Lucas Guthrie. His current whereabouts are unknown.
- Yrdisis – An artist and lover of Khoryphos who helped to smuggle the victims of Slicer out of Lemuria until she was uncovered by Brother Visaara. She was later captured by Weird Sisters to aid in resurrection of Maelstrom but was rescued by the Eternals. Her current whereabouts are unknown
- Zakka – A toolmaker who built a time-displacer that was able to bring forth ancient warriors. He summoned Tutinax, but was killed by him.
- Zona – A member of the Sword of Damacles who could turn invisible and generate electric shocks.

=== Deviant Mutates ===
The Deviant Mutates are the creations of the Deviants. Among the known Deviant Mutates are:

- Bandrhude – A type of Deviant mutate who were used prior to Great Cataclysm (the sinking of Atlantis). Bandrhude was later used in the modern era by Ghaur and Kro.
- Brutus – A Deviant Mutate who briefly led the Deviants after Ghaur's seeming destruction by the Dreaming Celestial. Brutus organized the Subterranean wars and persecution of Deviant mutates. Brutus was killed when he was exposed as a mutate.
- Cataphrax – A warrior and former wrestler in the Unlimited Class Wrestling Federation who has strength rivaling Ikaris. He was killed by Thena.
- Dromedan – Dromedan was bred by the Deviants as a weapon against the Eternals. Imprisoned beneath New York City by the Eternals. Dromedan has vast psionic powers, including mind control, illusions and telekinesis. He can also emit destructive energy blasts, and transform matter.
- Giganto – A servant of the Mole Man.
- Glomm – A servant of Dulpus.
- Gorgilla – Member of the Fin Fang Four. He was formerly used as a pawn by Kro.
- Gort – An agent of Brutus who was defeated by the Hulk.
- Grottu – It was produced through the Deviant mutate stockpiles. Grottu battled Ulysses Bloodstone, who killed him in combat.
- Karkas – A former gladiator who allied with the Eternals. Karkas was trained by the scholars in Olympia and assisted in Kro's rebellion against Ghaur. Karkas was later defeated by Reject.
- Lizard Men – A race of Deviant mutates with a reptilian appearance who reside in Subterranea. Several Lizard Men were once used as agents of Kro and journeyed to Midnight Mountain and attempted to help capture Makkari.
- Megataur – A monster serving the Mole Man.
- Metabo – A Deviant Mutate engineered by Kro who can absorb cosmic energy from Eternals.
- Minotaur – A monster who was possibly the creature formerly contained within the labyrinths of Aegean sea. The Minotaur battled Ikaris.
- Molten Man-Thing – A creature from a volcano who invaded the island of Napuka. It battled Makkari (who was posing as Frank Harper). The Molten Man-Thing was defeated when its heat energy was dissipated by immense fan.
- Spore – A Deviant Mutate who was created millennia ago as the ultimate weapon against the Eternals. The Spore gained immortality from consuming Eternals, but was destroyed circa 18000 BC by the Celestials.
- Tricephalous – A three-headed monster who lives on Monster Isle and is a servant of Mole Man.
- Tutinax the Mountain Mover – A Deviant mutate and a gladiator who aided Dromedan.
- World-Devouring Worm – A mutated earthworm with the ability to continually increase in size.

=== Deviants of the planet Lyonesse ===
- Blackwulf (Pelops) – The son of Tantalus and leader of the Underground Legion. He was killed by his father.
- Blackwulf (Lucian) – The brother and successor of Pelops and the son of Tantalus.
- Bristle – Member of the Peacekeepers.
- Id – The son of Tantalus and brother of Blackwulf (Pelops and Lucien). Its current whereabouts are unknown.
- Khult – A Deviant from Tebbel who is the father of Nirvana. He became servant of Tantalus but usurped his rule of Armechadon at the same time.
- Lady Trident – A member of the Peacekeepers who was killed one of Touchstone's bodies. However, she was placed in stasis by another Touchstone.
- Mammoth (William "Willie" Amos) – A member of the Underground Legion and possibly the past self of Wraath. His arm was cut off by Blackwulf (Lucian) to save him from the Black Legacy.
- Nirvana – The daughter of Khult, wife of Tantalus, and mother of Lucian, Pelops and Id. She committed suicide after giving birth of Lucian. Her body was preserved in undead form by Khult and was later released into death with Lucian's aid.
- Pandara – A servant of Lord Tantalus. His current whereabouts are unknown.
- Schizo – Member of the Peacekeepers and the sister of Touchstone. She was rendered comatose by Touchstone.
- Tantalus – The Armechadonian Deviant who is the father of Pelops, Lucian, and Id, and the husband of Nirvana. He used the Peacekeepers as agents on Earth. Tantalus was killed by Blackwulf (Lucian).
- Touchstone – Member of the Underground Legion and the sister of Pandara.
- Toxin – Member of the Underground Legion.
- Wraath (William "Willie" Amos) – Member of the Peacekeepers. He is a cyborg who is possibly the future self of Mammoth.

=== Delta Network ===
The Delta Network, also referred to as the Delta Force, was a group of Deviant warriors who were organized by Warlord Kro. When the Avengers were captured by the Deviant priesthood, Kro called the members into action to rescue them. Delta Network members included: Ransak the Reject, Karkas, Enigmo, and Donald and Deborah Ritter (the twin children of Thena and Kro). The Delta Network appeared only in Avengers #370–371. The group was created out of pre-existing characters by Glenn Herdling and Geof Isherwood.

=== Skrulls ===
The Skrulls are nearly all Deviants who eliminated the other offshoots of their species, leaving only one of the original race (Prime Skrull) and a Skrull Eternal (Kly'bn).

== In other media ==
The Deviants appear in Eternals, with Kro as a prominent member. This version of the species were created to progress and ensure the development of life in the universe by wiping out apex predators on various planets. The Deviants came to hunt down and wipe out all life, leading to the creation of the Eternals to stop them.
