= Donald Ritter =

Don or Donald Ritter may refer to:

- Donald L. Ritter (born 1940), U.S. Representative from Pennsylvania
- Donald Ritter, fictional character in Marvel Comics, see Donald & Deborah Ritter
- Don Ritter (artist) (born 1959), Canadian media artist
