= Blackwulf =

Blackwulf (Lucian)
- Artistic depiction of Blackwulf (Lucian)

Publication information
- Publisher: Marvel Comics
- First appearance: Thunderstrike #6 (March 1994)
- Created by: Glenn Herdling (writer); Angel Medina (artist)

In-story information
- Alter ego: Lucian; Pelops (predecessor)
- Species: Deviant
- Place of origin: Armechadon
- Partnerships: Sparrow, Mammoth, Giant-Man
- Abilities: Enhanced strength and durability Black Legacy energy manipulation

Blackwulf (Lucian) is a character appearing in American comic books published by Marvel Comics.

== Creation ==
Editor Ralph Macchio, who conceived the character, said of the character's genesis:

"I have been a huge fan of Kirby's New Gods and I love the Eternals. I edited The Eternals for a long period of time wherever it had a subsequent series after Jack's initial run. I just loved all that huge mythological stuff and all the things that he had created. Of course, Thor was, you know, probably my favorite character at Marvel and the whole mythology. He has guardian mythology behind, you know, Thor. So I just began to conceive with these characters. I kind of took cues from the New Gods. Obviously, Blackwulf is a conflicted character; he's got the Black Legacy and he takes arms against his father, very much what Orion did against Darkseid. And Tantalus is this kind of Darkseid-type figure in that he's huge, overwhelming, rules with an iron fist and all."

== Fictional character biography ==
Lucian is the fourth son of Lord Tantalus and Queen Nirvana of Armechadon. Though all of Tantalus' children are genetically perfect, Lucian bears a birthmark that was considered his affliction of the Black Legacy. On the evening that Tantalus was to venture to Earth, Nirvana kills herself to prevent herself from giving birth to any more monstrous children. Holding low respect for Lucian, Tantalus decides to bring Lucian with him to Earth, where the Celestials decided to exile Tantalus. Tantalus creates an underground lair called Lyonesse where he and his sons, Lucian and Pelops, lived.

Becoming obsessed with training, Lucian spars with his brother Pelops and repeatedly loses. Tantalus decides to send Lucian to retrieve Caitlin Maddox, a genetic researcher who could stabilize the DNA of Lucian, his family, and other Deviants. This mission is interrupted by the arrival of the Underground Legion, with Lucian battling their leader Blackwulf. The Underground Legion escapes with Maddox.

Blackwulf (Pelops). Art by Angel Medina.

After Lucian returns to Lyonesse, Pelops reveals his identity as Blackwulf to Lucian. He taunts Lucian and dares him to kill him, but Lucian cannot bring himself to do so. Unknown to them both, Lord Tantalus has overheard their conversation and kills Pelops himself, hopeful that this would show Lucian not to go against him. Instead, Lucian vows to destroy his father and takes the identity of Blackwulf for himself.

Blackwulf attempts to inform the Peacekeepers of what had happened to Pelops, but they reject his accusations against Tantalus. Blackwulf then goes looking for the Underground Legion and offers to become their latest member. Though the group does not trust Lucian immediately, he proves himself worthy to them as they fight the Peacekeepers at Wright-Patterson AFB. The battle ends with the Peacekeepers escaping, while the Underground Legion is forced to flee.

Wildwind (one of the members of the Underground Legion) is seemingly killed in the crash. Blackwulf battles the villain Scorch in the wreckage of the fighter and is able to match his power, but he and the Underground Legion are forced to surrender when reinforcements arrive for Scorch. They are taken and imprisoned at the base. However, Blackwulf is set free by Dr. Maddox and the Prime Skrull.

Blackwulf joins the Underground Legion and Giant-Man in following Sparrow to Ottsville, Pennsylvania, where she had gone missing while on assignment. They find that the people of Ottsville had been taken over by living circuitry created by Ultron and that Sparrow herself was under his control. Mammoth breaks Ultron's control over Sparrow by telling her that Lucian had killed Pelops and that he was now Blackwulf. Sparrow attacks Blackwulf, but is brought to her senses. The Underground Legion and Giant-Man are unable to capture Ultron, but Giant-Man mends some of Ultron's damage by making the people of Ottsville believe that they had been restored to full humanity.

Blackwulf returns to the mansion with the Underground Legion, and Sparrow starts another fight with him, still holding him responsible for Pelops' death. Blackwulf has an opportunity to kill her with his Black Legacy, which she welcomes. Blackwulf decides to stand down, revolted by her lack of emotion. He tells Sparrow how Pelops' last words had been that he loved her—but Lucian did not think she deserved such love. In response, Blackwulf leaves the Underground Legion.

Blackwulf is attacked by the Celestial Godstalker, who believes him to be his father Tantalus. The Godstalker transports Blackwulf to another dimension. However, Sparrow accesses the dimension with the aid of Khult and gives Blackwulf the Shadowlance, which has been reforged by Khult. Blackwulf attacks the Godstalker, who is convinced that he is not Tantalus. The Godstalker agrees to help Blackwulf destroy Tantalus and bonds to the Shadowlance, which cures him of the Black Legacy and removes his birthmark.

Enraged Blackwulf (Lucian). Art by Angel Medina.

Blackwulf catches up with Deathlok in a series of tunnels where he was aiding homeless people against the Sewer King alongside Daredevil, Blackwulf decides to wait with his questions to assist the homeless from bombs. When he was finally able to ask Deathlok questions, Blackwulf is told that his fate has already been sealed. Lucian asks Deathlok to join the Underground Legion, but Deathlok replies that he had to sort himself out first before he could be of use to anyone.

Apparently brought to Armechadon by Khult, Blackwulf joins the Underground Legion in battling Lord Tantalus and his Peacekeepers and reunites with his mother, Nirvana. Wishing to end her suffering, Blackwulf absorbs Nirvana's Black Legacy into himself, regaining his birthmark but setting her free.

== Powers and abilities ==
Lucian possesses enhanced strength and durability. As a result of his heritage, Lucian is afflicted with Black Legacy, a form of energy that can instantly destroy anything living upon contact. Lucian bears a birthmark of a stripe along the left side of his face, which is a representation of the Black Legacy within him. When using his powers, this stripe covers the entire left half of his face.

The Shadowlance lets Lucian channel the Black Legacy bound by his anger and rage into energy blasts.
