= Karkas (comics) =

Publication information
- Publisher: Marvel Comics
- First appearance: The Eternals #8 (Feb. 1977)
- Created by: Jack Kirby

In-story information
- Species: Deviant
- Team affiliations: Eternals; Delta Network
- Abilities: Superhuman strength and durability

Karkas is a fictional character appearing in American comic books published by Marvel Comics. Karkas is a member of the Deviants, a monstrous offshoot of humanity created by the Celestials.

== Publication history ==
The character first appeared in The Eternals #8 (Jan. 1977) and was created by writer/artist Jack Kirby.

== Fictional character biography ==
Karkas was born in Deviant Lemuria, too monstrous in appearance even by Deviant standards. He was made a slave, pitted in gladiatorial contests against others considered grotesque. Another gladiator was Ransak, who was considered hideous by the Deviants due to his normal human appearance. Karkas and the Reject were pitted against each other, in a bout viewed by the Eternal Thena, in which Ransak bested Karkas. When Eson the Searcher attacked, Karkas begged Thena for sanctuary with the Eternals. Thena teleported both Karkas and Ransak away to Olympia. With Thena and Ransak, Karkas battled Zakka and Tutinax. Since then the two have become friends and reside primarily with the Eternals. Karkas became a scholar.

Later, Karkas fought Thor, and then became his ally. He participated in a battle between the Olympian gods and Eternals.

Later, Karkas captured Warlord Kro. Karkas attempted to save Margo Damian's life by tricking Ghaur. Karkas helped fight Ghaur's army, and was present at Margo's burial.

Karkas later battled the Eternal Ajak, who had been transformed into a monster. He witnessed the apparent demise of Ajak and Daniel Damian. Karkas was part of the Delta Network led by Kro, assembled to challenge Ghaur's grip on the Deviants. He continued to support Kro's faction in his dispute with Ghaur for the deviant's leadership. Karkas was briefly transformed into a monster by Apocalypse. Later, he helped Thor in a battle against the Deviants in Lemuria. He also went with Deadpool to the Negative Zone to rescue his friend Ransak.

== Powers and abilities ==
Karkas is an adolescent, and quite intelligent and artistic despite his appearance. Karkas has superhuman strength, stamina, and durability. He has great learning abilities and a high aptitude in philosophy, and has been described as having an eidetic memory. Karkas possesses a wrinkled elephant-like red hide that is exceptionally thick and rough, making him highly resistant to injury.

Karkas wears body armor of unknown composition, designed by Eternal armorers and technicians.
