= Marvel Super Hero Squad =

Action figure line marketed by Hasbro

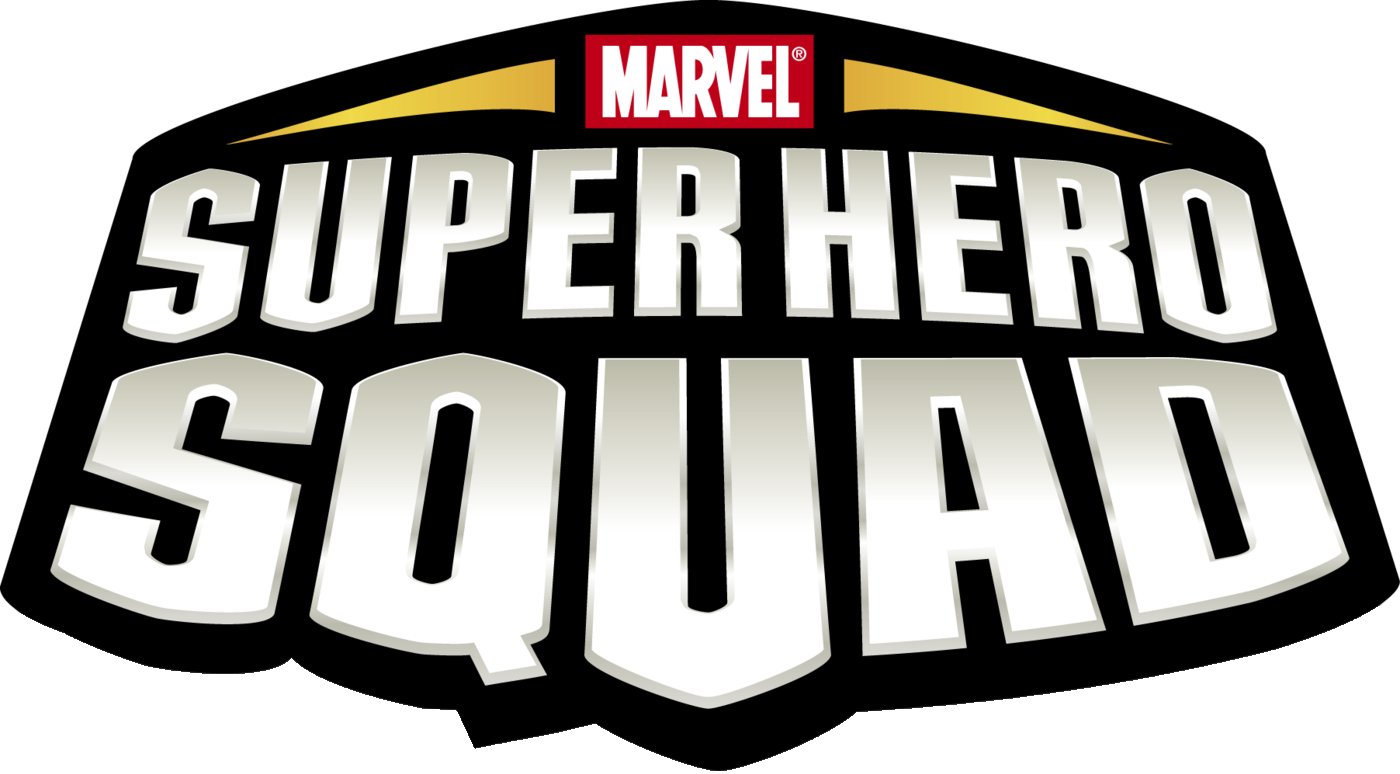
- Type: Children action figures
- Invented by: Marvel Comics
- Company: Hasbro
- Country: United States
- Availability: 2007–13
- Features: Marvel Universe heroes

Marvel Super Hero Squad is an action figure line marketed by Hasbro beginning in 2007. The line features 2-inch (51 mm) scale replicas of comic book heroes from the Marvel Comics universe. Each figure is portrayed in a cartoonish super-deformed style. The line was designed for younger collectors, but has become a hit with fans of all ages despite the "for ages 3 and up" category status.

Marketed initially as four two-packs per wave, Super Hero Squad has branched out to include larger multi-packs, vehicles, and mega-packs containing larger characters in scale with the 2-inch (51 mm) line.

An animated series, The Super Hero Squad Show, based on the toy line premiered in the United States on Cartoon Network in September 2009. In 2013, Hasbro released the exclusive figures of Iron Man 3 boxsets. After these, there would be no more toys based on the later MCU movies.

== Specific toys ==
Among the lines of toys released:

- Marvel Super Hero Squad Two-Packs — 23 "waves" of superheroes, usually four packs per wave, and of course two figures per pack, for approximately 180 figures.
- Single Packs — 6 of the heroes were released as individual figures: Spider-Man, Ben Reilly, Iron Man, Hulk, Wolverine, and Silver Surfer.
- Easter Egg Packs — 4 single releases for Easter: Spider-Man (jumping), Spider-Man (crouching), Captain America, and Hulk.
- Spider-Man Super Hero Squad Two-Packs — 5 "waves" of four different pairs of heroes.
- Spider-Man Single Packs — Six different supervillains released individually, only in the UK: Spider-Man, Venom, Doc Ock, New Goblin, Sandman, and Green Goblin.
- Hulk Super Hero Squad Two-Packs — 3 "waves" of four pairs, totaling 12 figures, each pack including one Hulk.
- Vehicles — 14 vehicles of various types have been released.
- Playsets — 8 different playsets have been released.
- Marvel Super Hero Squad Mega-Packs — A sequence of "waves" of pairs was started, but aborted partway through wave 4, with at least a 5th being planned.
- Boxed Sets — Many boxed sets have been released.

== Outside the toyline ==
Aside from the line of toys:

- An animated series, The Super Hero Squad Show, premiered in the United States on Cartoon Network in September 2009.
- A Chutes and Ladders board game is available from Milton Bradley.
- A comic book one-shot, followed by a mini-series featuring Super Hero Squad characters has been produced. Additionally, several Marvel comics shipped in September 2009 featuring Super Hero Squad variant covers.
- A daily comic strip is available at marvel.com. The strip began in late 2008.
- In early 2009 Gazillion Entertainment announced Marvel Super Hero Squad Online, a casual, browser-based Massively multiplayer online game based on the Super Hero Squad characters as part of its larger deal with Marvel Entertainment. The Amazing Society, one of Gazillion's development studios, would be developing the game. The game's open beta was opened in April 2011, with the full release occurring in November 2012. The servers, and the website, were shut down in January 2017.
- In May 2009, Marvel and THQ announced an action-adventure video game based on the Marvel Super Hero Squad franchise for the Wii, Nintendo DS, PlayStation 2, and PlayStation Portable.
- It was revealed in June 2010 that Marvel Super Hero Squad would have a new game, called Marvel Super Hero Squad: The Infinity Gauntlet.
- A third game, which used the uDraw GameTablet was released on November 15, 2011, under the name Marvel Super Hero Squad: Comic Combat.
