= Thena =

Fictional character from Marvel Comics

- Textless cover of Eternals (vol. 4) #3 (October 2008). Art by Daniel Acuña.

Publication information
- Publisher: Marvel Comics
- First appearance: As Minerva: Red Raven Comics #1 (August 1940); As Thena: The Eternals #5 (November 1976); As Corona: New Eternals: Apocalypse Now #1 (February 2000)
- Created by: Martin A. Bursten; Jack Kirby

In-story information
- Alter ego: Azura
- Species: Eternal
- Team affiliations: Eternals; Heroes for Hire; Stark International
- Notable aliases: Thena Eliot; Athena; Zura; Betty Sue Bialovsky; Prime Eternal
- Abilities: Superhuman strength, stamina, durability, speed, agility, and reflexes; Cosmic manipulation; Matter transmutation; Psychokinesis; Regeneration; Teleportation; Immortality; Flight

Thena (born Azura) is a character appearing in American comic books published by Marvel Comics. Created by Martin A. Bursten and Jack Kirby, the character first appeared as Minerva in Red Raven Comics #1 (August 1940), but was later reintroduced as Thena in The Eternals #5 (November 1976). She is a member of the Eternals, a race of superhumans in the Marvel Universe. She was also a member of Heroes for Hire.

Angelina Jolie portrays Thena in the 2021 Marvel Cinematic Universe film Eternals.

== Publication history ==
Thena first appeared in Jack Kirby's The Eternals #5 (November 1976). Marvel Comics continuity was later retconned so that the character presented as the mythological god Minerva, introduced in Red Raven Comics #1 ("Mercury in the 20th Century" by artist Kirby and writer Martin A. Bursten; August 1940), was actually Thena.

The character appeared in the ongoing series The Eternals, written by Jack Kirby and later in a Thor storyline that ran from Thor #291–301.

She become one of the main characters of the Eternals (vol. 2) in 1985 written by Peter B. Gillis and penciler Sal Buscema, and in the one-shot comic called The Eternals: The Herod Factor #1 in 1991.

== Fictional character biography ==
=== Early life ===
Thena was born in the city of Olympia in ancient Greece, and is thus one of the Eternals of Olympia. Originally named Azura, but her father Zuras had her name changed by royal decree to be similar to that of Athena and seal the treaty between the Olympian gods and the Eternals. The Eternals would act as the gods' representatives on Earth, with Thena serving as Athena's personal representative. Due to this, she has often been mistaken for Athena and Minerva.

Thena became a scholar and a warrior as she grew. She encountered Kro in Babylon 2,500 years ago. He had a chance to kill her, but did not; as the years passed, the two of them grew closer together. During the Vietnam War, Thena becomes pregnant with twin children from Kro. She implants the children inside Ms. Ritter, an infertile woman, who raises them as her own children, Donald and Deborah.

=== Modern age ===
In modern times, the Eternals and Deviants reveal themselves to the human world. When Kro leads his armies in an attack on New York City, Thena opposes him to help rescue Sersi. After Kro calls a truce, he brings Thena to the Deviant city of Lemuria to try to resume his relationship with her. However, Thena is horrified by the Deviants' customs, including the mass killing of "undesirables". She leaves Lemuria with the Deviant gladiators Ransak and Karkas.

After Zuras' death and the subsequent departure of most of Earth's Eternals, Thena becomes Prime Eternal, leader of the remaining Eternals on Earth.

=== Memory loss and aftermath ===
In the 2006 Eternals title, Thena appears as a normal woman married to Thomas Eliot with a son, Joey, and working a researcher at Stark Enterprises. Like Sersi and Makkari, she was affected by Sprite's reality warping to have no memory of her past as an Eternal. While at a party, Thena is attacked by mercenaries, who kill her husband. Thena's proximity to the other Eternals causes all of them to regain their powers. With their returned powers, Thena frees herself from the mercenaries.

=== Death ===
Later when the Celestials' Final Host arrived on Earth, Thena along with all the Eternals killed themselves after realizing the true purpose for which they were created. Thena and the other Eternals are later resurrected simultaneously.

== Powers and abilities ==
Thena is a member of the race of superhumans known as the Eternals. As a result, she has superhuman strength, speed, stamina, durability, agility, and reflexes. Thena also possesses the ability to manipulate cosmic energy to augment her life force, granting her virtual invulnerability and immortality, the ability to project cosmic energy from her eyes or hands in the form of heat, light, or concussive force and possibly other powers. Thena has total mental control over her physical form, granting virtual invulnerability and immortality. She also has the ability to levitate herself and thus fly at superhuman speed, the psionic ability to rearrange the molecular structure of objects, the ability to cast illusions to disguise her appearance and that of others from the perceptions of normal human beings, the ability to teleport herself and others with her, and the ability to initiate formation of the Uni-Mind.

Thena is intellectually gifted and has studied under both Eternal and human scholars. She is educated in numerous areas of Eternal and human knowledge. She is also an expert on hand-to-hand combat, unarmed combat and many ancient and Eternal high-tech weapons.

Thena wears body armor of unknown composition. She carries a bow that fires arrows that release "cold energy", and she carries an energy spear that surrounds victims with a ring of intense heat and light or bombards them with anti-gravitons.

== Reception ==
=== Accolades ===
- In 2019, CBR.com ranked Thena 6th in their "The 15 Most Powerful Eternals" list.
- In 2021, Screen Rant ranked Thena 2nd in their "10 Most Powerful Members Of The Eternals" list
- In 2021, CBR.com ranked Thena 7th in their "10 Strongest Characters From Eternals Comics" list.
- In 2022, Syfy ranked Thena 4th in their "5 Marvel heroines who deserve their own MCU movie franchise" list.

== In other media ==
=== Film ===
Thena appears in Eternals, portrayed by Angelina Jolie. This version suffers from Mahd Wy'ry, a condition which the Eternals believe to be the result of accumulating so many memories over their centuries-long lives. It is later learned that Thena's condition is the result of an unsuccessful mind-wipe, which is normally performed on every Eternal after missions.

=== Video games ===
- Thena appears as an unlockable playable character in Marvel Super War.
- Thena appears as an unlockable playable character in Marvel Future Fight.
- Thena appears as a companion character in Marvel Future Revolution.
- Thena appears in Marvel Snap.

=== Miscellaneous ===
Thena appears in Marvel Knights: Eternals motion comic, voiced by Lisa Ann Beley.
