= Angel Medina (artist) =

American comic book artist (born 1964)

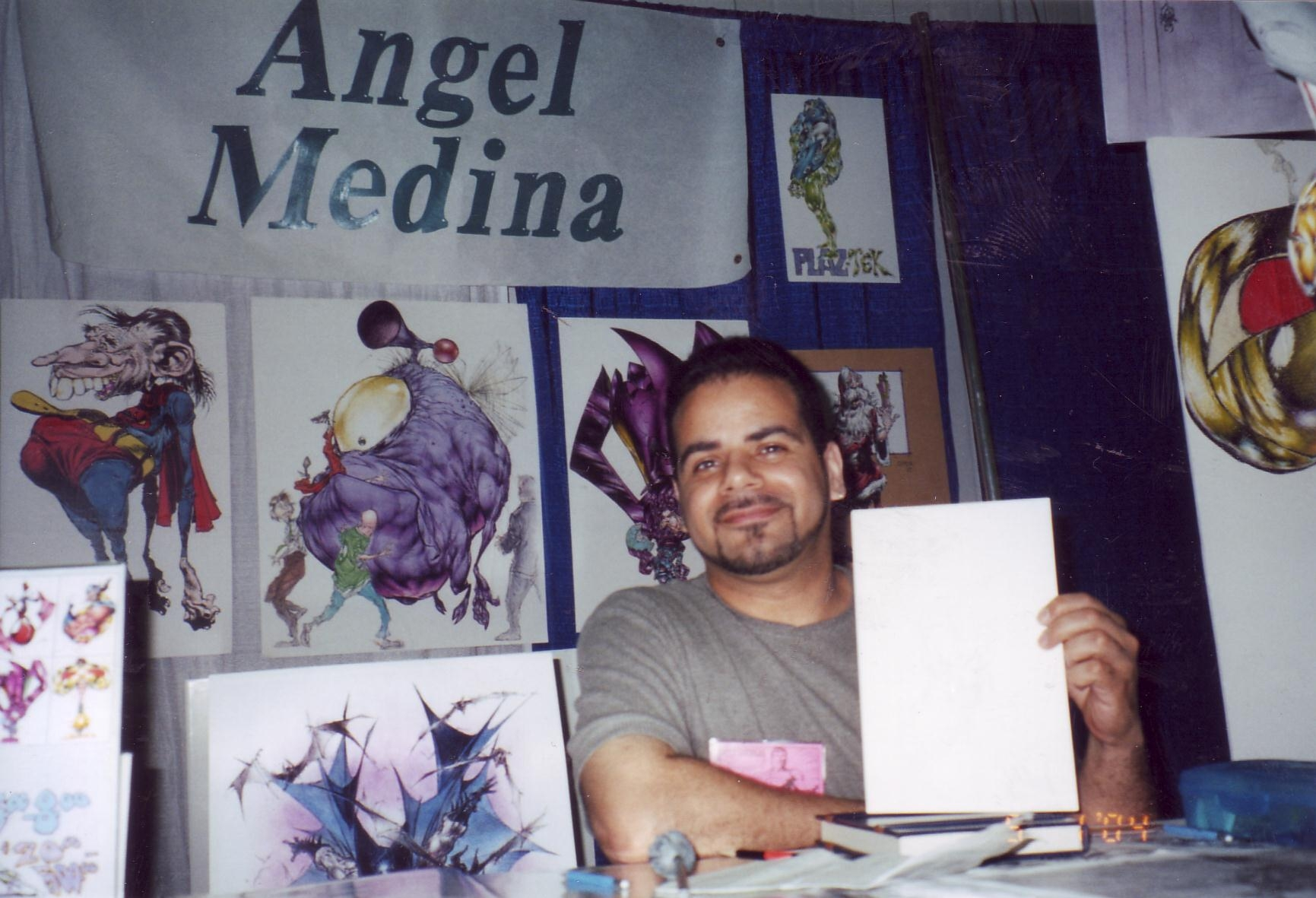
- Medina in 2004
- Born: March 25, 1964 (age 62)
- Area: Penciller

Angel Medina (/məˈdiːnə/; born March 25, 1964) is an American comic book artist known for his work for various comic book companies, including Megaton Comics, First Comics, Marvel Comics, and Image Comics.

== Career ==
Medina began his career illustrating such titles as Berserker and Megaton at Megaton Comics. He subsequently worked for First Publishing, on such titles as Dreadstar and Hammer Of God in the late 1980s, before starting to work for Marvel Comics on The Incredible Hulk, Warlock and the Infinity Watch (#1,2,5,6,10,14,15,18,20,22,25), Blackwulf, Avengers, The Amazing Spider-Man, Marvel Knights Spider-Man and Venom: Dark Origin.

He then worked for Image Comics, illustrating Sam and Twitch, a spinoff of the title Spawn. Medina later illustrated Spawn itself, and Kiss: Psycho Circus, based on the rock music group Kiss.

== Notes ==
Preceded by Liam Sharp	The Incredible Hulk artist 1995–1996	Succeeded by Mike Deodato
