= Marvel Super Hero Squad: The Infinity Gauntlet =

2010 video game

- North American cover
- Developer: Griptonite Games
- Publisher: THQ
- Writer: Mark Hoffmeier
- Composer: Mick Gordon
- Series: Marvel Super Hero Squad
- Platforms: Nintendo DS, Wii, PlayStation 3, Xbox 360, Nintendo 3DS
- Release: NA: November 16, 2010; AU: November 18, 2010 (DS); PAL: November 19, 2010; 3DS: NA: October 11, 2011; AU: October 13, 2011; EU: November 18, 2011
- Genres: Fighting, beat 'em up
- Modes: Single-player, multiplayer

Marvel Super Hero Squad: The Infinity Gauntlet is a fighting video game, and the sequel to Marvel Super Hero Squad. It was released in November 2010 for Nintendo DS, PlayStation 3, and Wii, and was released for the first time on a Microsoft console, the Xbox 360. Similar to the first game, it features cartoonish super-deformed versions of Marvel Comics characters, as seen in the Marvel Super Hero Squad toy line, as well as the television show. The 3DS version was released in 2011.

== Gameplay ==
There are three modes of play in the game: the first is Story Mode, which allows a single player to complete the game story with a limited selection of heroes available; the second mode is Challenge Mode, which allows up to four players to play together with an increased choice of thirty different Marvel superheroes and supervillains; the final mode of play is Freeplay Mode, which allows the player to go back to any level and replay it as any character.

The game features levels based on locations from the animated series, and also has a number of collectable objects from the Marvel Universe that unlock additional in-game content such as costumes, as well as some items being unlocked by completing mission objectives.

The Story Mode is loosely based on the Marvel: Ultimate Alliance franchise. After completing the first three missions, the player gets sent to the Helicarrier to continue with their mission, try out Freeplay or even find some hidden objects in the Helicarrier each time a mission is completed.

== Plot ==
Hulk and Iron Man go shopping in outer space to get boots for Thor's birthday. At some point the boots are mixed up with the Super-Skrull's laundry, so the two Squaddies follow him. When Thanos receives a box containing the Infinity Gauntlet, he finds out that Iron Man and Hulk are within his ship. After a battle with Super-Skrull, the Squaddies escape back to the Helicarrier. Iron Man notifies the rest of the squad that they must find all of the Infinity Stones before Thanos does. While Iron Man makes his speech, Doctor Doom, Silver Surfer, Nebula, and Loki listen in.

Falcon and Thor retrieve the Rhythm Stone from Hercules, which is later revealed to be a fake gemstone with Loki and the Enchantress hidden inside. Hulk and She-Hulk retrieve the Mind Stone from Nightmare. Invisible Woman and Nova are sent to the Negative Zone to get the Time Stone from Nebula and Annihilus. Iron Man and Wolverine get the Soul Stone from the Grandmaster.

Scarlet Witch and Quicksilver move throughout Asteroid M to retrieve the Stone. Spider-Man and Reptil later go and retrieve the Reality Stone while dealing with Abomination, who is trying to break Doctor Doom out of prison.

Wolverine and Black Widow visit the Skrull Throne World and meet with the Silver Surfer, who he reveals that Galactus is planning to consume the world. They successfully stop Galactus. Meanwhile, the Helicarrier goes under an attack and the squad loses the Infinity Gems to Thanos. Later on, the Squaddies defeats Thanos, but Silver Surfer steals the stones. He becomes the Dark Surfer, and each squad member works to stop him.

== Development ==
In July 2010, THQ unveiled the trailer for Marvel Super Hero Squad: The Infinity Gauntlet at San Diego Comic-Con. Also in October, the game made its first interactive appearance at New York Comic-Con held at the Jacob Javitts center in midtown Manhattan.

== Reception ==
Reception

Aggregate score
Aggregator	Score				
Aggregator	3DS	DS	PS3	Wii	Xbox 360
Metacritic	54/100	N/A	54/100	49/100	55/100

Review scores
Publication	Score				
Publication	3DS	DS	PS3	Wii	Xbox 360
Game Informer	N/A	N/A	N/A	N/A	6.75/10
Jeuxvideo.com	11/20	15/20	12/20	12/20	12/20
NGamer	N/A	N/A	N/A	36%	N/A
Official Nintendo Magazine	N/A	N/A	N/A	52%	N/A
Official Xbox Magazine (UK)	N/A	N/A	N/A	N/A	5/10
Official Xbox Magazine (US)	N/A	N/A	N/A	N/A	6.5/10
The Guardian	N/A	N/A	N/A	N/A	3/5

The 3DS, PlayStation 3 and Xbox 360 versions received "mixed" reviews, while the Wii version received "generally unfavorable reviews", according to the review aggregation website Metacritic.

== Sequel ==
A sequel was released in November 2011. The game requires the uDraw GameTablet. Comic Combat was developed by Griptonite Games and THQ.
