= Marvel Super Hero Squad (video game) =

2009 video game

- North American Wii box art
- Developers: Blue Tongue Entertainment (Wii); Halfbrick (DS); Mass Media (PS2 and PSP)
- Publisher: THQ
- Director: Robert Blackadder
- Designers: Phil Anderson; Hartley Mitchell
- Programmers: Alister Hatt; Paul Baker
- Artists: Julian Lamont; Darren Tibbles; Alex Ries
- Writer: Mark Hoffmeier
- Composer: Mick Gordon
- Series: Marvel Super Hero Squad
- Platforms: Nintendo DS; Wii; PlayStation 2 PlayStation Portable
- Release: NA: October 20, 2009; AU: October 21, 2009 (DS, Wii); EU: October 23, 2009
- Genres: Beat 'em up, fighting
- Modes: Single-player, multiplayer

Marvel Super Hero Squad is a video game developed by Blue Tongue Entertainment, Mass Media, and Halfbrick and published by THQ. It was released in October 2009 for the Nintendo DS, PlayStation 2, PlayStation Portable, and Wii. The game features cartoonish super-deformed versions of the Marvel Comics superhero characters, as seen in the Marvel Super Hero Squad toy line by Hasbro, as well as the television show made by Film Roman and Marvel Animation for Cartoon Network.

== Gameplay ==
Marvel Super Hero Squad is split into two parts: Adventure Mode and Battle Mode. In Adventure Mode, there are 6 chapters for each hero: Iron Man, Silver Surfer, Hulk, Wolverine, Falcon and Thor. In the character selection, and the level players are playing, there is the main character, then the player gets to pick their own superhero, and they have a large amount of choices. In each level, they have to defeat a wave of enemies and achieve their target (Ms. Marvel tells them what to do). If it's a boss level, it is similar to the Battle mode although what the player has to do is either achieve 5 points, 7 points or 10 points in order to defeat him. Battle Mode is a free-for-all fighting mode. The player makes a new profile, then they have two options: Versus Mode or Squad Mode. If it is Versus Mode, they pick their character they want to play as but if it's Squad Mode, Player 1 picks two characters and Player 2 picks the other two characters. Then in the Options section, the player picks how many points they can achieve in the battle: 5, 10 or more. Then they go and play the battle. Once finished, they can play again with different characters or go back to the main menu.

== Plot ==
The Hulk battles A.I.M. soldiers

A group of soldiers cover an Infinity Fractal. Doctor Doom plans to get the Infinity Fractal so he can make the Infinity Melder (a small version of the Infinity Sword). AIM Agents then ambush the soldiers, leading to a shootout between the two groups. Then the Super Hero Squad intervene and destroy the fractal into pieces and one large chunk of it is stuck in MODOK's forehead. Iron Man tells the Super Hero Squad to find all 6 missing pieces of the fractal. Doctor Doom says that he can't let those super heroes get the fractals first. Iron Man introduces to the team a new invention called: The Stark Shard Locator and Monitor (SSLAM for short). So the team get into action and they find the 6 missing pieces of the fractal.

When they've collected all the 6 missing pieces of the fractal, the Mayor of Super Hero City congratulate them for their heroics. The civilians cheer for them then the Mayor reveals the fine works of art of the superheroes. Then Dr. Doom stands in one of them. Iron Man says it's the real Dr. Doom. The people scream. Dr. Doom shock-blasts the superheroes then unleashes his secret army (which is Modokbots). Doctor Doom blames MODOK. The team put on Stark Industries Mind Control Nullifying Belt Buckles and they have to defeat all the Modokbots. Once they've finished defeating Dr. Doom with the Infinity Sword, he's defeated and Ms. Marvel with the helicarrier takes him in. Iron Man congratulates the superheroes for their hard work.

== Development ==
Marvel Super Hero Squad was first announced on May 28, 2009, and later presented at E3 2009. It marked the first game to be developed from a licensing agreement between Marvel Comics and THQ.

== Reception ==
Reception

Aggregate score
Aggregator	Score			
Aggregator	DS	PS2	PSP	Wii
Metacritic	61/100	59/100	51/100	49/100

Review scores
Publication	Score			
Publication	DS	PS2	PSP	Wii
1Up.com	N/A	N/A	N/A	C+
4Players	23%	43%	41%	44%
GamesMaster	N/A	N/A	N/A	39%
GameSpot	N/A	N/A	N/A	4.5/10
GamesRadar+	N/A	N/A	1.5/5	N/A
GameZone	N/A	N/A	6/10	4/10
IGN	5.9/10	5.8/10	5.5/10	5.8/10
Jeuxvideo.com	9/20	N/A	8/20	9/20
NGamer	N/A	N/A	N/A	30%
PlayStation: The Official Magazine	N/A	N/A	1.5/5	N/A
Teletext GameCentral	N/A	N/A	N/A	3/10

The game received "mixed" reviews on all platforms except the Wii version, which received "generally unfavorable reviews", according to the review aggregation website Metacritic.

== Sequel ==
A sequel titled Marvel Super Hero Squad: The Infinity Gauntlet was released November 16, 2010. Griptonite Games developed the sequel. Like the first game, it was released on the Wii and Nintendo DS, but was also released on the PlayStation 3 and Xbox 360 rather than the PlayStation 2 and PlayStation Portable.

Another sequel, Marvel Super Hero Squad: Comic Combat, was produced afterwards, requiring the uDraw GameTablet peripheral.
