= Glenn Herdling =

American author (born 1964)

- Born: Glenn Alan Herdling; May 2, 1964 (age 62) Summit, New Jersey
- Areas: writer, editor, manualist
- Notable works: Namor the Sub-Mariner, Piper Houdini: Apprentice of Coney Island, Piper Houdini: Nightmare on Esopus Island

Glenn Herdling (born May 2, 1964) is an American author, comics writer, and editor who has written numerous comic books, including Marvel Comics' Namor the Sub-Mariner series. He is also the author of the Piper Houdini series of young adult novels and a manualist.

== Early life ==
Herdling was born on May 2, 1964. He graduated from Bucknell University in 1986 and shortly thereafter began his publishing career at Marvel Comics.

== Career ==
As assistant editor to Jim Salicrup on Marvel's flagship Spider-Man titles, he was instrumental in acquiring the talent that increased circulation to a record 2.5 million copies.

Herdling was promoted to editorial director of Marvel's Custom Publishing division and when the company went public in 1991, he developed the company's first Quarterly and Annual Reports, which were done as comic books.

In 1992, Herdling created and wrote Illuminator, the first Marvel character whose powers were tied to his faith as a Christian.

Herdling became the regular writer on Namor, the Sub-Mariner when his editor was reassigned to the book. According to Herdling, this abrupt change of plans was the reason why the first issue of his run, number 44 (November 1993), was an out-of-continuity story whose text was taken entirely from the poem "The Rime of the Ancient Mariner". He was enthusiastic about his run on the series and later confided that, before the series was cancelled, he had been planning a follow-up story arc to "Atlantis Rising" called "Deities of the Deep" which would have pitted Namor against the Norse god Ægir.

In 1996, Herdling became the Creative Director at Spiderwebart Gallery, which engaged in traditional book publishing, packaging, and design.

In 1999, Herdling became Wizard Entertainment's Director of Business Development and supervised the launch of its new comic book division, Black Bull Entertainment. He received a Master of Science degree from New York University. Later, as director of marketing for Medco Health Solutions, he served on the publications committee of the American Medical Writers Association.

Herdling has since worked as a communications specialist in the healthcare and financial sectors. He has contributed to numerous published works and has written over 80 comic books. In 2015, he published his first novel, Piper Houdini: Apprentice of Coney Island and followed it up a year later with a sequel, Piper Houdini: Nightmare on Esopus Island.

In 2016, Herdling launched a YouTube channel where he performs a variety of popular songs using manualism: the art of playing flatulent tones by squeezing air through his hands.

== Bibliography ==
=== Marvel ===
==== Text ====
- Article, Avengers by John Byrne Omnibus (2016)
- Articles, Marvel Age #56–57, 62, 64–68 (November 1987 – November 1988)
- Article, Marvel: The Year in Review #1 (1989)
- Associate Writer, The Official Handbook of the Marvel Universe #7–8 (1989)
- Research, text (with others), Official Handbook of the Marvel Universe Master Edition #1–22 (1990–1992)
- Articles ("A View from the Herd"), Nomad No. 1, 3–6, 8, 10, 12, 15, 17, 19, 25 (May 1992 – May 1994)
- Article, The Punisher No. 17 (March 1989)
- Associate writer, Spider-Man: Birth of Venom (2007)
- Associate Writer, X-Men: Fallen Angels (2011)

==== Comics stories ====
- The Avengers #366, 370–371 (September 1993 – February 1994)
- The Avengers Annual #22 (1993)
- Avengers Spotlight #25 (Dec. 1989)
- Avengers/Ultraforce (Marvel Comics/Malibu Comics) #1 (October 1995)
- Avengers Unplugged #1–2 (October 1995 – August 1996)
- Blackwulf #1–10 (June 1994 – March 1995)
- Cable #10 (with Fabian Nicieza), 11, 12 (with Scott Lobdell), 13–14 (April–August 1994)
- Daredevil #310–311 (November–December 1992)
- Daredevil Annual #9 (1993)
- Deadpool #42 (July 2000)
- Fantastic Four: Atlantis Rising #1–2 (June–July 1995) With Tom DeFalco
- Fantastic Four Unlimited #11 (Sept. 1995) (Sub-Mariner story)
- Illuminator #1–3 (1993)
- Iron Man #255 (April 1990) With Fabian Nicieza
- Marvel Comics Presents #18 (Early May 1989)
- Marvel Team-Up volume 2, #8–11 (April–July 1998) With Tom Peyer
- Namor, the Sub-Mariner #45–50, 42–62 (December 1993 – May 1995)
- Red Sonja: Scavenger Hunt #1 (Dec. 1995)
- Rune/Silver Surfer #1 (1995)
- Scarlet Spider Unlimited No. 1 (November 1995)
- The Spectacular Spider-Man Annual #9–10, 12013 (1989–1993)
- Spider-Man '97 (1997)
- Spider-Man Unlimited #14 (November 1996)
- Uncanny Origins No. 11 (July 1997)
- The Uncanny X-Men Annual #18 (1994)
- What If...? volume 2, #16, 31 (August 1990 – November 1991)
- What The--?! (1988 series) #3 (October 1988)
- "Fast Lane: Media Blitz" (Part 1 of 4: Spider-Man anti-drug public-service announcement inserted into Marvel Comics dated October–November 1999)
- "Fast Lane: Feel the Rush" (Part 2 of 4: Spider-Man anti-drug public-service announcement inserted into Marvel Comics dated November 1999 – January 2000)
- "Fast Lane: On the Edge" (Part 3 of 4: Spider-Man anti-drug public-service announcement inserted into Marvel Comics dated February–April 2000)
- "Fast Lane: Back on Target" (Part 3 of 4: Spider-Man anti-drug public-service announcement inserted into Marvel Comics dated April–May 2000)
