= Donald & Deborah Ritter =

Publication information
- Publisher: Marvel Comics
- First appearance: Eternals: The Herod Factor #1 (1991)
- Created by: Roy Thomas; Dann Thomas; Mark Texeira

In-story information
- Species: Eternal–Deviant hybrid
- Team affiliations: Eternals; Delta Network (Deborah)
- Notable aliases: Dark Angel -Tzabaoth; Doublemint Twins
- Abilities: Merge

Donald and Deborah Ritter are fictional characters appearing in American comic books published by Marvel Comics. They are the twin children of Thena, leader of the Eternals, and Kro, sometime leader of the race of Deviants.

== Publication history ==
The Ritter twins were created by Roy Thomas, Dann Thomas and Mark Texeira. They first appeared in the one-shot special Eternals: The Herod Factor.

== Fictional character biographies ==
Thena and Kro, despite being members of two offshoots of humanity who have been traditional enemies, had a relationship for over 25,000 years. During the Vietnam War, the two had a sexual encounter, and Thena discovered she was pregnant. Using her powers, she secretly implanted the embryos into an infertile human woman, whose children grew up unaware of their ancestry. When Daniel Damian, a human who was aware of the existence of Deviants and Eternals, sends a monster (formerly Ajak) to kill the two children, killing numerous other sets of twins in the process, Thena takes the two to Olympia, the city of Eternals, but does not inform them of their heritage. Despite Thena's efforts, the Ritter children are captured and taken to Peru. The twins learn of their true origin and are rescued by Kro and Thena.

The Ritter twins have been shown few times since then; In Avengers #370-371, the two joined Kro's Delta Network, and demonstrated the ability to merge into a two-mouthed, four-eyed and four-armed creature called Tzabaoth. In Heroes for Hire #6, they again merged, forming a winged metallic creature called Dark Angel.

== Powers and abilities ==
The Ritter twins are able to merge their bodies into a single entity. Their combined form possesses superhuman strength and can fly and project energy from its eyes.
