= The Super Hero Squad Show =

American superhero animated series

- Promotional poster
- Genre: Action; Adventure; Comedy; Science fantasy Slapstick; Superhero
- Based on: Marvel Super Hero Squad
- Developed by: Matt Wayne
- Voices of: Charlie Adler; Alimi Ballard; Steve Blum; Dave Boat; Jim Cummings; Grey DeLisle; Mikey Kelley; Tom Kenny; Stan Lee; Tara Strong; Travis Willingham
- Theme music composer: Parry Gripp; David Ari Leon
- Opening theme: "The Super Hero Squad Show" Theme
- Ending theme: "The Super Hero Squad Show" Theme (instrumental)
- Composer: Guy Michelmore
- Country of origin: United States
- Original language: English
- No. of seasons: 2
- No. of episodes: 52 (list of episodes)

Production
- Executive producers: Alan Fine; Simon Phillips (season 1); Eric S. Rollman; Dan Buckley (season 2); Jeph Loeb (season 2)
- Producer: Dana C. Booton
- Running time: 22–23 minutes
- Production companies: Film Roman; Marvel Animation

Original release
- Network: Teletoon (Canada); Cartoon Network (US)
- Release: September 14, 2009 – October 14, 2011

The Super Hero Squad Show is an American superhero animated series produced by Marvel Animation that aired from 2009 to 2011. It is based on the Hasbro toyline "Marvel Super Hero Squad", which portrays the Avengers, the X-Men, and various other Marvel characters in chibi forms.

The show is also a self-aware parody of Marvel, taking influence from the Mini Marvels series. The series was produced by Film Roman and Marvel Animation. It was made available to stream on Disney+ in December 2019.

== Plot ==
=== Season 1 (2009–10) ===
Prior to the beginning of the series, Doctor Doom attempted to acquire the Infinity Sword in pursuit of world domination. Iron Man foiled his plan, but the sword was destroyed and separated into fragments known as Infinity Fractals.

In the present, Doom forms the Lethal Legion to gather the fractals. Doom's forces, including MODOK and Abomination, dwell in Villainville, which is separated from Super Hero City by a giant wall. Opposing Doom is Iron Man, who now leads the Super Hero Squad—also consisting of Falcon, Hulk, Silver Surfer, Thor, and Wolverine—to gather the fractals first and ensure the Infinity Sword cannot be used for evil.

The Super Hero Squad is headquartered in the S.H.I.E.L.D. Helicarrier, and are frequently aided in their defense of Super Hero City by their boss Captain America, S.H.I.E.L.D. leader Ms. Marvel, rookie Squad member Reptil, and many more of their superhero friends.

At the end of the first season, Galactus arrives to devour Earth, leading the Squad to reforge the Infinity Sword to stop him. Silver Surfer takes the Sword and leaves the team to serve as Galactus' herald.

=== Season 2 (2010–11) ===
The second season focuses on traveling to different parts of the Marvel Universe, the galaxy, different dimensions, and through time. Thanos is the main antagonist for the first half of the season, seeking the Infinity Gems to gain supremacy over the universe. Scarlet Witch replaces Surfer, with original squad members Iron Man, Hulk, Falcon, Wolverine and Thor returning.

In the second half of the season, the Surfer is corrupted by the Sword's power, steals the Infinity Gauntlet from Thanos, and becomes the Dark Surfer. He scatters the Squad throughout time and space, but is eventually defeated and the Infinity Sword destroyed once more. Silver Surfer refuses to rejoin the Squad until he repents for his actions.

== Episodes ==
Season	Episodes	Originally released	
Season	Episodes	First released	Last released
1	26	September 14, 2009	February 20, 2010
2	26	October 23, 2010	October 14, 2011

== Cast ==
- Charlie Adler – Captain Britain, Doctor Doom, Melter, Plantman, Sabretooth, Wrecker, Super-Skrull (season 1), Doombots, Cynthia Von Doom, Phil Sheldon
- Alimi Ballard – Falcon, Thunderball
- Steve Blum – Wolverine, Heimdall (season 1), Abomination, Fin Fang Foom, Pyro, Thanos (season 1), Dro'ge, Redwing, Zabu
- Dave Boat – Thor, Thing, Uatu the Watcher, Trapster, Baron Mordo, Captain Liechtenstein, Adam Warlock, Dracula, Doc Samson, Man-Thing
- Jim Cummings – Thanos (season 2), Super-Skrull (season 2), Human Torch
- Antony Del Rio – Reptil
- Grey DeLisle – Ms. Marvel, Enchantress, Volcana, Frigga
- Mikey Kelley – Silver Surfer, Iron Fist
- Tom Kenny – Iron Man, Captain America, Colossus, Juggernaut, MODOK, Fandral, Sentinels, Space Phantoms
- Stan Lee – Mayor of Superhero City
- Tara Strong – Invisible Woman, H.E.R.B.I.E., Scarlet Witch, Anelle, Toro, Alicia Masters, young Iron Man, Brynnie Bratton
- Travis Willingham – Hulk, Human Torch, Skurge, Piledriver, Hyperion, Zeus, Balder

== Crew ==
- Guy Michelmore – Composer
- Jamie Simone – Casting and voice director, sound supervisor

== Production ==
The show's executive producers included Alan Fine, Simon Philips, and Eric Rollman, with Joe Quesada and Stan Lee as co-executive producers. Cort Lane was supervising producer. Mitch Schauer, creator of the Nickelodeon series The Angry Beavers, was the show's supervising director and character designer. Matt Wayne was the show's story editor and head writer. Other writers include Michael Ryan, Nicole Dubuc, Atul Rao, Eugene Son, James Krieg, and Mark Hoffmeier. Singer-songwriter Parry Gripp composed the theme song.

Marvel executive and writer Jeph Loeb explained the series as something everyone would like, stating "Marvel Super Heroes have always entertained fans of all ages in our comics, and we're proud to offer an animated series that families can enjoy together. With the most exciting super-powered adventures, The Hub can now offer the greatest fun of all—experiencing Marvel for the very first time. So whether you want to fly with Thor, suit up with Iron Man or smash with Hulk, this series has everything your family wants to see from our heroes."

== Broadcast history ==
The show's first season was to debut on Cartoon Network in the United States on September 19, 2009, but aired five days earlier on September 14, 2009. The second season of the series, based on The Infinity Gauntlet, premiered on October 23, 2010 and stopped being shown on Cartoon Network on February 19, 2011, with episode 40 ("Fate of Destiny!"). Afterward, new episodes aired only on Teletoon and were available to purchase on iTunes. On July 23, 2011, the series returned on Cartoon Network, at a new timeslot of 12:00 pm. Although in the next following weeks no new episodes aired. In September 2011, Cartoon Network announced that The Super Hero Squad Show would be airing new episodes on weekday mornings at 7:00 am starting Monday, October 3, 2011. The series ended on October 14, 2011. A total of 52 episodes were produced for the show. Hub Network began airing the series on January 30, 2012 as part of their daily weekday line-up and aired on Discovery Family until January 30, 2015. As a result of Cartoon Network losing the rights to the show, all Super Hero Squad content was removed from the network's website as the result, the rights reverted back from Warner Bros. Discovery to Disney following the acquisition of Marvel Entertainment in 2009. On January 3, 2020, both seasons of the show were added to Disney+.

The series first premiered on Teletoon in Canada on Sunday, September 13, 2009, at 8:30 am as part of the network's Action Force block. The show returned on Teletoon on Sunday, February 6, 2011, at 7:00 am for the debut of the second season. All 52 episodes aired in Canada, ending on July 10, 2011.

The series premiered on December 4, 2009, in Australia, on ABC3, in October 2009.

It was aired on Nicktoons in the UK. The show also used to air reruns on Disney XD in the United States.

== Home media ==
=== United States ===
Most of the episodes have been released on DVD across several volumes by Shout! Factory.

- The Super Hero Squad Show: Quest For The Infinity Sword, Volume 1, released July 13, 2010, includes episodes 1–7 from Season 1, as well as bonus features.
- The Super Hero Squad Show: Quest For The Infinity Sword, Volume 2, released November 9, 2010, includes episodes 8–13 from Season 1 as well as bonus features.
- The Super Hero Squad Show: Quest For The Infinity Sword, Volume 3, released February 8, 2011, includes episodes 14–19 from Season 1.
- The Super Hero Squad Show: Quest For The Infinity Sword, Volume 4, released May 3, 2011, includes episodes 20–26 from Season 1.
- The Super Hero Squad Show: The Infinity Gauntlet, Vol. 1, released August 2, 2011, includes the first six episodes from Season 2 (episodes 27–32 overall).
- The Super Hero Squad Show: The Infinity Gauntlet, Vol. 2, released November 22, 2011, includes the next seven episodes from Season 2 (episodes 33–39 overall).
- The Super Hero Squad Show: The Infinity Gauntlet, Vol. 3, released April 17, 2012, includes an additional seven episodes from Season 2 (episode 40–46 overall) and a special promotional code for Marvel Super Hero Squad Online.
- The Super Hero Squad Show: The Infinity Gauntlet, Vol. 4, released on August 21, 2012, includes the final episodes of season 2 (episode 47–52 overall).

=== United Kingdom ===
Five volumes have been released on DVD so far. Hero Up contains episodes 1–6, Hulk Smash contains episodes 7–11, Don't Call Me Wolvie contains episodes 12–16, Tales of Evil contains episodes 17–21, and Mother of Doom contains episodes 22–26.

=== Australia ===
Magna Home Entertainment released The Super Hero Squad Show: The Infinity Fractal War (Vol 1) and Titanic Team-Ups (Vol 2) on June 2, 2010, and The Lethal Legion Strikes (Vol 3) on September 8, 2010. Each DVD includes 6–7 episodes of the show, as well as character profiles. (Australian release). The final volume of Season 1, entitled Quest for the Infinity Sword (Vol 4) was released on November 3, 2010, containing the final six episodes of Season 1. Season 2 The Infinity Gauntlet (Vol 1) is currently available. Infinite Thanos (Vol 2) was also released on November 2, 2011.

=== Canada ===
Vivendi Entertainment under the named Vivendi Entertainment Canada released two volumes under the names of The Super Hero Squad: Hero Up, Squaddies (Vol 1) and The Super Hero Show: Titanic Team Ups (Vol 2), both released on May 4, 2010. A Vol 3 was announced to release on June 29, 2010. On September 28, 2010, Vivendi released a The Super Hero Squad Show: The Complete Season 1 DVD set containing an unnamed Vol 3 and Vol 4.

== Reception ==
Rob Keyes of Screen Rant said, "In short, this is just a big pile of awesome for kids. For adult Marvel fans, it's still a fun watch too, especially if you have children of your own to share the experience with. There's a lot of shout outs (and a few jokes) for the fans that only adults would pick up on," while Shawn S. Lealos included it in their "10 All-Time Best Animated Series Based On Marvel Comics" list. Philip Etemesi of Comic Book Resources ranked The Super Hero Squad Show 10th in their "13 Best Animated Movies & TV Shows Featuring Black Panther" list.

== In other media ==
=== Comic books ===
A four-part comic book series based on the show called Marvel Super Hero Squad was released in the fall of 2009. The series was a success and Marvel renewed the series in January 2010 as an ongoing series, now entitled: Super Hero Squad. The comic does not feature only characters from the show, but also characters outside the show. As of December 8, 2010, Super Hero Squad had a total of 12 issues released. No new issues have been released since, seemingly indicating that the comic book franchise has been cancelled. Trying to bring back the franchise, Marvel released a Super Hero Squad Spectacular where the Beyonder sends them to another planet with their Lethal Legion foes.

=== Video games ===
- Marvel Super Hero Squad was released on October 20, 2009.
- Marvel Super Hero Squad: The Infinity Gauntlet was released on November 16, 2010.
- Marvel Super Hero Squad Online, a massively multiplayer online game, was released to the public in April 2011. The game was heavily based on the Super Hero Squad franchise, with The Super Hero Squad Show's character designs returning. The game was shut down in 2017.

=== Miscellaneous ===
- In the Mad segment "Avenger Time", Iron Man, Captain America, Hulk, and Thor enter a reality from the Cosmic Cube that resembles The Super Hero Squad Show.
- In the Ultimate Spider-Man episode "Flight of the Iron Spider", Living Laser is transported to The Super Hero Squad Show universe, where Thor defeats him.
