= Kro (character) =

Marvel Comics supervillain

- Kro as he appeared during Thor: The Deviants Saga. Art by Stephen Segovia.

Publication information
- Publisher: Marvel Comics
- First appearance: As Rudolph Hendler/Pluto: Red Raven Comics #1 (August 1940); As Kro: The Eternals #1 (July 1976)
- Created by: Martin A. Burnstein; Jack Kirby

In-story information
- Alter ego: Kro
- Species: Deviant
- Team affiliations: Deviants; Eternals
- Notable aliases: Warlord Kro, Prince of Darkness
- Abilities: Shapeshifting; Immortality; Accelerated healing factor superhuman physical attributes

Kro (sometimes referred to as the Warlord Kro) is a supervillain appearing in American comic books published by Marvel Comics.

Kro appeared in the Marvel Cinematic Universe film Eternals (2021), voiced by Bill Skarsgård.

== Publication history ==
Created by Jack Kirby, Kro first appeared in The Eternals #1 (July 1976).

== Fictional character biography ==
Kro is a leading member of the Deviant race, an evolutionary offshoot of humanity created by the Celestials. He is one of the first Earth Deviants created. Besides being a shapeshifter, he is immortal. He hides this from his fellow Deviants by pretending to be his own descendant. Also hidden from the Deviants is his long-standing (100,000 years) on-off relationship with Thena, leader of the Eternals and mother of their twin children, Donald and Deborah Ritter. Their relationship later unravels.

In the advent of the Heroic Age, Kro attacks New York, trying to incite fear in the human population of the incoming Celestial judgement. He battles the Eternals and agrees to a truce with Thena, showing themselves to the modern world. Kro tries to reconcile with Thena, bringing her to Lemuria. Thena is treated as royalty, but becomes horrified with many of the Deviants' practices, including their gladiatorial fights to the death and killing of Deviants with more monstrous appearances. Thena flees Lemuria with the gladiators Ransak and Karkas, angering Kro.

After the death of Deviant aristocrat Brother Tode, Kro returns to Lemuria and became a figurehead monarch for the Deviants. He enters a power struggle with Priestlord Ghaur, who decides to take power de facto. Kro attacks the Eternals once more with his giant armada. However, Ikaris and Makkari defeat the Deviants. Kro is betrayed by agents of Ghaur and escapes.

Kro joins Thena in fleeing from the Deviants and the Eternals. Finally, Ikaris finds them and replaces Thena as Prime Eternal after a ceremony. Ghaur tries to take the power of the Dreaming Celestial, but is stopped by the Avengers and Eternals. After the disintegration of Ghaur, Kro remains as the leader of the Deviants and agrees to a truce with Ikaris.

Some time later, Kro locates Thena and her twin children, Donald and Deborah Ritter. Together, they end the tyranny of Brother Visara in Lemuria and join as a family. Kro is also the founder of the Deviant team Delta Network, including some heroic Deviants like Ransak, Karkas and his own children. He led them in an attempt to rescue the Avengers from Ghaur.

A plague devastates Lemuria, rendering all male Deviants sterile. A power struggle between Ereshkigal and Ghaur ensues. Ghaur wins and promises the Deviants that they will have their fertility restored with the help of the kidnapped Eternal Phastos. Kro is acting in the sidelines as general and attacks Olympia, bringing the Eternals' resurrection machine and Phastos to Lemuria. Thor rescues Phastos and battles Ghaur. Kro activates a stolen Asgardian Unbiding stone, which threatens to destroy the universe. When Thor destroys the stone, Ghaur and Ereshkigal disappear and Kro is left to lead the Deviants. He regrets the incident and tells Thor that he has abandoned his ambitions.

== Powers and abilities ==
Despite being a Deviant, Kro possesses a number of superhuman traits that are characteristic of an Eternal. Kro maintains a virtually unbreakable mental control over the processes and structure of his body, even when he is asleep or unconscious. As a result, Kro has a lifespan that has already lasted over 100,000 years and is immune to disease and aging. His mental control over his body enables him to maintain a youthful, vigorous physical condition and heal himself of injury.

Kro also possesses the power of physical malleability, which is atypical for a Deviant. At will, he can cause most of the tissue of his body to become pliant, enabling him to shape it mentally like putty into different configurations. However, Kro cannot alter the shape of his skeleton in more than minor ways. Moreover, he cannot eliminate any of his mass while transforming; he can only redistribute his 320 lb (150 kg) of weight.

Kro has about three times the physical endurance of an ordinary human athlete. His heart is not located in the same place as an ordinary human being's; its true location is unrevealed.

== In other media ==
Kro appears in Eternals (2021), voiced by Bill Skarsgård. This version was previously the leader of the Deviants and was frozen in ice during an attack on Earth millennia prior. In the present day, he and several other Deviants are freed after the ice melts and he resumes his attack on Earth, gaining increased power and intelligence as well as a more humanoid form after absorbing power from several Eternals. Ultimately, he is killed by Thena after failing to absorb her power.
