= Hulked Out Heroes =

2010 Marvel Comics miniseries

- Cover of the 1st issue

Publication information
- Publisher: Marvel Comics
- Format: Limited series
- Publication date: June 2010
- No. of issues: 2
- Main character(s): Hulk; Red Hulk; Avengers; Wolverine; Captain America; Spider-Man; Thor; Deadpool; Doc Samson; Intelligencia

Creative team
- Written by: Jeff Parker
- Penciller: Humberto Ramos
- Inker: Carlos Cuevas
- Letterer: Joe Sabino
- Colorist: Edgar Delgado
- Editor(s): Nathan Cosby; Michael Horwitz; Mark Paniccia; Joe Quesada

Collected editions
- Hulk: World War Hulks - Hulked-Out Heroes: ISBN 0-7851-4371-8

Hulked Out Heroes is a two-issue comic book crossover mini-series, written by Jeff Parker and published by Marvel Comics in June 2010. It is part of the World War Hulks crossover storyline.

The series stars Hulk, Red Hulk, and includes some of the Avengers in a "Hulked" form, including Wolverine, Captain America, Spider-Man and Thor. In addition, a "Hulkified" Deadpool called "Hulkpool" serves as the antagonist alongside Doc Samson and the Intelligencia.

== Plot summary ==
Bob, Agent of Hydra sends Hulkpool, a gamma-powered Deadpool, back in time to kill his past self. However, Hulkpool is accidentally transported to the year 1717 and meets a pirate version of the Thing, becoming his first mate. While battling a Kraken, the two are transported to the Savage Land in the present day due to Bob's interference. There, they encounter Devil Dinosaur and Moon Boy. After attempting to return the Thing to his original time, the group arrives in the Old West in 1873, where Hawkeye is similarly lost in time, and Devil Dinosaur begins wreaking havoc.

After everyone is returned to their proper times, Hulkpool is transported to the end of World War II, when Bucky Barnes was seemingly killed in a missile explosion. He decides to rescue Bucky and assists him and Captain America in hunting and killing Adolf Hitler and the Red Skull. After Bob tries to transport him through time once more, he ignorantly prevents the origin stories of numerous superheroes, including the original Hulk. He ultimately succeeds in killing the alternate timeline Deadpool and returns to the main Marvel universe.

== Collected editions ==
The series is collected into a trade paperback, together with the miniseries World War Hulks: Captain America vs. Wolverine and World War Hulks: Spider-Man vs. Thor.

- Hulk: World War Hulks - Hulked-Out Heroes (112 pages, softcover, July 2010, ISBN 0-7851-4371-8).

== In other media ==
Elements of Hulked Out Heroes are incorporated into The Avengers: Earth's Mightiest Heroes episode "Gamma World", where the Avengers are mutated by the Leader's gamma dome.

Elements of Hulked Out Heroes are incorporated into the Avengers Assemble episode of the same name, where MODOK and the Red Skull transform the Avengers using a gamma bomb before the Hulk cures them.
