= Moon Girl and Devil Dinosaur =

American animated superhero comedy television series

- Genre: Superhero; Comedy-drama; Musical
- Based on: Moon Girl And Devil Dinosaur by; Brandon Montclare; Amy Reeder; Natacha Bustos; Devil Dinosaur by Jack Kirby
- Developed by: Steve Loter; Jeffrey M. Howard; Kate Kondell
- Showrunners: Steve Loter; Pilar Flynn (season 2)
- Voices of: Diamond White; Fred Tatasciore; Alfre Woodard; Sasheer Zamata; Jermaine Fowler; Gary Anthony Williams; Libe Barer
- Opening theme: "Moon Girl Magic" by Diamond White
- Composer: Raphael Saadiq
- Country of origin: United States
- Original language: English
- No. of seasons: 2
- No. of episodes: 41

Production
- Executive producers: Steve Loter; Laurence Fishburne; Helen Sugland
- Producers: Pilar Flynn (season 1); Rafael Chaidez (season 2)
- Running time: 22 minutes; 44 minutes ("Moon Girl Landing" only)
- Production companies: Disney Television Animation; Marvel Animation; Cinema Gypsy Productions

Original release
- Network: Disney Channel (Note: Simulcast with Disney XD in season 2.); Disney+ (Note: Many episodes were released on Disney+ first before their linear television premieres on Disney Channel and Disney XD.)
- Release: February 10, 2023 – March 8, 2025

Marvel's Moon Girl and Devil Dinosaur (or simply Moon Girl and Devil Dinosaur) is an American animated superhero comedy television series developed by Steve Loter, Jeffrey M. Howard and Kate Kondell for Disney Channel and Disney+ based on Moon Girl And Devil Dinosaur by Marvel Comics. The series follows Lunella Lafayette and her dinosaur companion Devil Dinosaur.

The series features the voices of Diamond White, Fred Tatasciore, Alfre Woodard, Sasheer Zamata, Jermaine Fowler, Gary Anthony Williams, and Libe Barer. Development began after Marvel Studios president Louis D'Esposito showed Laurence Fishburne the comic book series Moon Girl And Devil Dinosaur. His interest piqued, having been a fan of the original Moon-Boy and Devil Dinosaur, Fishburne sought to make an animated series based on the duo. Production proceeded for two years before Steve Loter was hired as an executive producer. After a successful pitch to Disney Television Animation executives, the series was greenlit and publicly announced in February 2018. It is produced by Cinema Gypsy Productions, Disney Television Animation, and Marvel Animation, with animation by Flying Bark Productions.

Marvel's Moon Girl and Devil Dinosaur premiered on Disney Channel on February 10, 2023, and was released on Disney+ five days later. In October 2022, ahead of the series premiere, the series was renewed for a second and final season. The series received positive reviews for its writing, animation, soundtrack, representation, and characters. The series won five Children's and Family Emmy Awards. The second and final season was split into two parts, with Part 1 premiering on February 2, 2024, and Part 2 premiering on February 6, 2025, with the show airing its final episode on March 8, 2025. A crossover with Spidey and His Amazing Friends, "Moon Girl and the Dino Dilemma", aired on November 15, 2024, with White and Tatasciore reprising their roles.

== Premise ==
Lunella Lafayette is a 13-year-old genius living with her parents and grandparents on the Lower East Side of Manhattan in New York City. One day, she activates a portal and a red Tyrannosaurus steps out of it. With the support of her friend Casey, she becomes a superhero named Moon Girl and names the dinosaur Devil Dinosaur.

In the second and final season, Lunella and Devil are in their prime element as the super heroes, Moon Girl and Devil Dinosaur. However, as Lunella's superhero life intertwines more with her personal life, especially after a multiversal encounter with a powerful alien villain named Molecule Man, she must decide if the cost of keeping her identity a secret is worth the toll it's taking on her family.

== Characters ==
=== Main ===
- Diamond White as Lunella Lafayette / Moon Girl, a gifted African-American girl who lives a double life as a superheroine and accidentally brings Devil Dinosaur into present-day New York.
- Fred Tatasciore as:
  - Devil Dinosaur, a red Tyrannosaurus with horns that was accidentally brought to present-day New York City by Lunella. He is shown to have a big appetite for food, especially hot dogs.
  - Coach Hrbek, Lunella's gym teacher at Intermediate School 833 who also works as a substitute science teacher.
- Alfre Woodard as Miriam "Mimi" Lafayette, Lunella's paternal grandmother who is a snack bar attendant at Roll With It and is an expert cook. In the first-season finale, it is revealed that Mimi was the original Moon Girl, having operated under that code name as a scientist, and that she secretly knows that Lunella and Moon Girl are one and the same.
- Sasheer Zamata as Adria Lafayette, Lunella's mother who is a social activist and DJ at Roll With It.
- Jermaine Fowler as James Lafayette Jr., Lunella's klutzy father and a sneaker clerk at Roll With It.
- Gary Anthony Williams as James "Pops" Lafayette Sr., Lunella's paternal grandfather and the proprietor of Roll With It.
- Libe Barer as Casey Calderon, Lunella's manager, best friend of Puerto Rican and Jewish ancestry, and confidant in regards to Lunella's identity as Moon Girl.

=== Villains ===
- Alison Brie as Ms. Dillon / Aftershock, a supervillain with electrokinesis and former science teacher.
- Fred Tatasciore as:
  - Devos the Devastator, a robotic being that speaks in the third person.
  - Moon Dinosaur, an alternate reality version of Devil Dinosaur.
- Carlee Baker as Sofie Slugfoot / Instantanegirl, an ex-hurdler who took a chemical compound that enhanced her leg muscles to give her more speed, which got her banned from the Olympic games.
- Aaron Drown as Timmy Grubbs / Man Baby, the infant son of a scientist who was accidentally enlarged by his scientist father's growth rays
- Ace Gibson as Gravitas, a supervillain whose gloves can shoot liquid that negates the gravity of his targets.
- Jennifer Hudson as Mane, Lunella's vengeful living hair.
- Maya Hawke as Abyss, a teleporter who is the daughter of an unnamed female supervillain.
- Daveed Diggs as Rat King, a humanoid rat villain who lives in the sewers and is served by the rats that live there.
- Kari Wahlgren as Linh Pham / Stiletto, a supervillain and shopaholic of high-heeled shoes whose special stilettos can expand to long heights.
- Gary Anthony Williams as:
  - Rockin' Rudy, a villain that always manages to evade capture despite not having any superpowers other than a working car.
  - Garko the Man-Frog, a humanoid frog villain and thief.
- Mae Jemison as Skipster, an app created by Lunella that can skip forward in time and is made to sound like her voice actress Dr. Mae Jemison.
- Sasheer Zamata as Flying Fox, a humanoid fox who can fly.
- June Diane Raphael as Marcy Muzzler, a scientist who is obsessed with gentrification.
- Paul Scheer as Marty Muzzler, a scientist and husband of Marcy who is obsessed with gentrification.
- Anna Akana as Odessa Drake, a social media influencer who is the daughter of the unnamed Thieves Guild leader.
- Method Man as Torg, a giant ape-like creature.
- Wesley Snipes as Maris Morlak, a mad scientist and member of Enclave who has connections with the original Moon Girl.
- Edward James Olmos as Molecule Man, a powerful alien being wielding a reality-warping wand who rules over a planet in another reality.
- Diamond White as Devil Girl, an alternate reality version of Lunella.
- Robin Thede as Zakiya / Quickwhip, an aspiring culinary chef who became a whip-wielding supervillain because of a bad turning point in her life that involves Lady Bullseye.
- Miki Yamashita as Maki Matsumoto / Lady Bullseye, a female supervillain with excellent accuracy.
- Kalen Aris Whitfield as Jester, a jester-themed villain.
- Sam Riegel as Jackson Weele / Big Wheel, a battle bot player turned supervillain.
- Parker Posey as Kat Swan, a philanthropist who owns a dog whistle that makes dogs do her bidding every since dogs didn't love her back when she was young.
- Manny Jacinto as Brian Glory / Blue Streak, a rollerblading enthusiast.
- SungWon Cho as General Hyles, the leader of the moth-like Zingarian army
- Jonathan Banks as Silvermane, a cybernetic crime lord.
- Chuck D as Beetle, a beetle-themed villain who was held captive by S.H.I.E.L.D.
- Angela Bassett as Decoy, a glittery villain seeking to join the villain big leagues.
- Bowen Yang as Mister Negative, a luxury condo magnate.
- Noel MacNeal as Dr. Madness, a mad scientist.

=== Recurring ===
- Laurence Fishburne as the Beyonder, a trickster with immense cosmic powers who is described as "curious and mischievous". He is here to judge humanity to see if they are worthy of existence. The Beyonder also provides background information about Lunella's foes (credited as "Backstory Man" for his voiceover narration in earlier episodes) to the viewers.
- Omid Abtahi as Ahmed, one of Lunella's neighbors who runs the local deli.
- Utkarsh Ambudkar as Anand, an intellectual rival of Lunella.
- Michael Cimino as Eduardo, Lunella's friend who is loud and loves music.
- Indya Moore as Brooklyn, the Captain of the school volleyball team, and a friend of Lunella's who is openly transgender.
- Craig Robinson as Principal Nelson, the principal of Intermediate School 833.
- Asia Kate Dillon as LOS-307, a sapient supercomputer. They become the new school counselor at Intermediate School 833 after Miss Sarah's retirement.
- Ian Alexander as Tai, a non-binary Asian-American friend of Lunella's, and the Setter of the school volleyball team.
- Tajinae Turner as Geri, a friend of Lunella's, and the Libero of the school volleyball team.
- May Calamawy as Fawzia, a lesbian Muslim friend of Lunella's, and the Blocker of the school volleyball team.
- Xolo Maridueña as Mel-Varr / Marvin Ellis / Kid Kree, a Kree who is sent to Earth.
- Gerald Waters as Eli, a wheelchair-using STEM student and Cecelia's boyfriend.
- Isabella Gomez as Cecelia, an excitable STEM student and Eli's girlfriend.
- Myha'la Herrold as Jurnee, a laid-back STEM student.

=== Guest ===
==== Multiple seasons ====
- Cobie Smulders as Maria Hill, an agent of S.H.I.E.L.D. who works under director Nick Fury. Smulders reprises her role from the Marvel Cinematic Universe.

==== Shorts guests ====
- Bone Raider, a man obsessed with stealing dinosaur bones from museums.
- Vicente Cimetta, a man with the ability to change his state of matter.
- Gammadroid, an android created by the Mad Thinker.

==== Season 1 guests ====
- Josh Keaton as Angelo, a boy with community-helping plans who becomes possessed by a trolling Symbiote called Syphonater.
- Andy Cohen as Isaac Goldberg-Calderon, one of Casey's fathers
- Wilson Cruz as Antonio Goldberg-Calderon, one of Casey's fathers
- Ramone Hamilton as TJ, Brooklyn's younger and annoying brother who is obsessed with his models.
- Luis Guzmán as Council President Diego Peña, the head of the L.E.S. city council.
- Gideon Adlon as Lara, Laura, and Laurel, Casey's triplet cousins who are always deadpan.
- Pamela Adlon as Rabbi Ryda, Casey's rabbi at her bat mitzvah.
- Laurence Fishburne as Bill Foster, a geneticist and Hank Pym's old friend, who was once his assistant on Project Goliath. He specializes in Pym particles. Fishburne reprises his role from the Marvel Cinematic Universe film Ant-Man and the Wasp.

==== Season 2 guests ====
- Ann Harada as Matsuye, a college friend of Mimi.
- Jackée Harry as Merle, a college friend of Mimi.
- Carol Kane as Bubbe Bina, a baker who owns a Knish bakery.
- Andy García as Pad-Varr, a Kree who is the father of Kid Kree.
- Ephraim Sykes as Bobby the Myth, a famous rapper known for selling swag.
- Kalen Aris Whitfield as Donny, a museum security guard.
- Cynthia Erivo as Akonam Ojo, a scientist from Wakanda whom Lunella looks up to.
- Giancarlo Esposito as Granite, a rock-skinned superhero.
- Alex Newell as Pebble, a dog with a powerful bark and Granite's animal sidekick.
- Bumper Robinson as Redwing, a psychic bird who wanted to know the identity of the Falcon that he is partners with.
- Cree Summer as Aragorn, a winged horse who wanted to fly in a plane like her superhero partner.
- Fred Stoller as Toothgnasher, a goat who refuses to talk about his superhero partner due to an "impending lawsuit".
- David Tennant as Franklin, a Scottish-accented alien dog who is a hero in his own right.
- Peter Weller as Dr. Stern, a strict museum curator who detests kids.
- Kimberly Brooks as Dani, a museum security guard.
- Arsenio Hall as Vernell Lewis, a roller skater and an old friend of Pops Lafayette.
- Erika Ishii as Turbo, a superhero with powered armor.
- Samuel L. Jackson as Nick Fury, the director of S.H.I.E.L.D. Jackson reprises his role from the Marvel Cinematic Universe.
- Yvette Nicole Brown as President Brown, the U.S. President

== Episodes ==
Note: Episodes are organized by production order for continuity reasons.

=== Series overview ===
Season	Episodes		Originally released	
Season	Episodes		First released	Last released
1	16		February 10, 2023	May 6, 2023
2	25	15	February 2, 2024	March 16, 2024
2	25	10	February 6, 2025	March 8, 2025

=== Season 1 (2023) ===
No. overall	No. in season	Title	Directed by	Written by	Storyboarded by	Original release date	Prod. code	U.S. viewers (millions)
1	1	"Moon Girl Landing" (Note: This episode is a one-hour special, comprising two regular half-hour episodes.)	Trey Buongiorno & Christine Liu	Jeffrey M. Howard & Kate Kondell	Chivaun Fitzpatrick, Jules Bridgers, Morgan Hillebrand, Lidia Liu, Alfred Coleman III, Annie J. Li & Kalen Aris Whitfield	February 10, 2023	101	0.21
2	2	"The Borough Bully"	Trey Buongiorno	Halima Lucas	Chivaun Fitzpatrick, Annie J. Li & Kalen Aris Whitfield	February 11, 2023	102	0.20
3	3	"Run the Rink"	Ben Juwono	Jeffrey M. Howard & Kate Kondell	Steve Hirt, Trey Buongiorno, Diana Kidlaied, Paulene Phouybanhdyt, Johnny Castuciano, Jessica Lin & Philip Pignotti	February 18, 2023 (Note: This episode was first released on Disney+ on February 15, 2023.)	103	0.16
4	4	"Check Yourself"	Rodney Clouden & Ben Juwono	Maggie Rose	Samir Barrett, Samm Lee & Tyre Jones	February 18, 2023	104	0.14
5	5	"Hair Today, Gone Tomorrow"	Christine Liu	Lisa Muse Bryant	Jules Bridgers, Morgan Hillebrand & Lidia Liu	February 25, 2023	105	0.19
6	6	"The Beyonder"	Ben Juwono & Samantha Suyi Lee	Halima Lucas	Samir Barrett, Tyre Jones, Samantha Suyi Lee, Kellye Perdue & Sixiao Tang	February 25, 2023	106	0.18
7	7	"Goodnight, Moon Girl"	Christine Liu	Liz Hara	Jules Bridgers, Morgan Hillebrand & Lidia Liu	March 25, 2023 (Note: The episode "Goodnight, Moon Girl" was originally scheduled to air as the seventh episode on March 4, 2023. However, due to a change in scheduling, it was replaced by the episode "Moon Girl's Day Off", which was originally scheduled to air as the tenth episode on March 25, 2023. "Goodnight, Moon Girl" eventually aired as the tenth episode on March 25. On Disney+, the episodes are arranged in their original production order, which is how the episodes are presented here.) (Note: This episode was first released on Disney+ on March 8, 2023.)	107	0.16
8	8	"Teacher's Pet"	Trey Buongiorno	Taylor Vaughn Lasey	Chivaun Fitzpatrick, Annie J. Li & Kalen Aris Whitfield	March 11, 2023	108	0.23
9	9	"Skip This Ad...olescence"	Samantha Suyi Lee	Halima Lucas	Samir Barrett, Chivaun Fitzpatrick, Steve Hirt, Tyre Jones, Waymond Singleton, Sixiao Tang, Kalen Aris Whitfield & Yunhao Zhang	March 18, 2023	109	0.12
10	10	"Moon Girl's Day Off"	Trey Buongiorno	Liz Hara & Lisa Muse Bryant	Chivaun Fitzpatrick, Annie J. Li & Kalen Aris Whitfield	March 4, 2023	110	0.15
11	11	"Like Mother, Like Moon Girl"	Samantha Suyi Lee	Halima Lucas	Samir Barrett, Sixiao Tang & Yunhao Zhang	April 1, 2023	111	0.13
12	12	"Today, I Am a Woman"	Christine Liu	Maggie Rose	Jules Bridgers, Morgan Hillebrand & Lidia Liu	April 8, 2023	112	0.13
13	13	"Devil on Her Shoulder"	Christine Liu	Taylor Vaughn-Lasley	Jules Bridgers, Morgan Hillebrand & Lidia Liu	April 15, 2023 (Note: This episode was first released on Disney+ on April 12, 2023.)	113	0.19
14	14	"Coney Island, Baby!"	Trey Buongiorno	Liz Hara	Chivaun Fitzpatrick, Annie J. Li & Kalen Aris Whitfield	April 22, 2023	114	0.14
15	15	"O.M.G.! Issue #1"	Trey Buongiorno	Taylor Vaughn-Lasley & Liz Hara	Chivaun Fitzpatrick, Annie J. Li & Kalen Aris Whitfield	April 29, 2023	115	0.13
16	16	"O.M.G.! Issue #2"	Christine Liu	Taylor Vaughn-Lasley & Liz Hara	Jules Bridgers, Morgan Hillebrand & Lidia Liu	May 6, 2023	116	0.13

=== Season 2 (2024–25) ===
No. overall	No. in season	Title	Directed by	Written by	Storyboarded by	Original release date	Prod. code	U.S. viewers (millions)
Part 1
17	1	"The Great Beyond-er!"	Samantha Suyi Lee	Halima Lucas	Samir Barrett, Sixiao Tang & Yunhao Zhang	February 2, 2024	201	0.13
Lunella is flung through time and space, but gets rescued by the Beyonder. They end up on a desolate planet where the Beyonder's powers suddenly become null. When Lunella spots a black hole, she concludes that they can build a ship that is fast enough to allow them to travel through it. The two must avoid other aliens that have a grudge against the Beyonder as Lunella teaches him to become more independent without his powers. Just as they are about to leave, they are attacked by the Molecule Man, the owner of the planet, and reveals that the Beyonder was the cause of the planet's desolation. Molecule Man comes close to killing Lunella, but the Beyonder snags his wand, getting his powers and allowing both of them to escape. Lunella is kicked back to two hours after the moment she left Mimi, Casey and, Devil; she reunites with them, but is traumatized from her trip.
18	2	"Suit Up!"	Trey Buongiorno; Annie J. Li (co-director)	Liz Hara	Chivaun Fitzpatrick, Annie J. Li & Kalen Aris Whitfield	February 2, 2024	202	0.11
Mimi decides to take Lunella out to her scientist friends to see if they can produce upgrades to her suit. The scientists—Merle and Matsuye—happily take on the challenge, but Lunella, still traumatized from her trip, insists on adding extra things to the suit out of fear. An enlargement ray accidentally causes a desert scorpion to grow large. After the suit proves too clunky, Lunella strips down to a simpler model and defeats the Scorpion. Lunella finally decides on a simplistic suit, but is saddened that Merle and Matsuye cannot see their family. Mimi agrees that both her and Lunella will tell their family their secrets when they are ready.
19	3	"Belly of the Beast"	Christine Liu; Morgan Hillebrand (co-director)	Liz Hara	Jules Bridgers, Morgan Hillebrand & Lidia Liu	February 10, 2024 (Note: This episode was first released on Disney+ on February 3, 2024.)	203	0.12
Casey surprises Lunella with the new and improved lab, but their contrasting workplace etiquette soon leads to a heated falling-out between them. When an experimental bomb accidentally gets swallowed by Devil, both girls shrink themselves down and venture inside of him to get it out. The two continue to bicker and split up, but when Lunella finds the bomb and gets trapped, she uses a song to alert Casey, who comes to her rescue. Lunella allows Casey to use her method, and both girls manage to escape and toss the bomb in a safety box so it can explode. Both girls apologize for their behavior towards one another, promising to be kinder.
20	4	"Ride or Die"	Trey Buongiorno; Annie J. Li (co-director)	Halima Lucas	Chivaun Fitzpatrick, Annie J. Li, Jessica Lin & Kalen Aris Whitfield	February 10, 2024	204	0.11
Lunella finally catches Quickwhip, but due to S.H.I.E.L.D. getting swamped with work, Lunella is forced to take her to their base by herself. On the train, they are attacked by Lady Bullseye and her Diabolical Darts. Quickwhip, whose real name is Zakiya, reveals that she wanted to be a chef, but circumstances lead her to be a criminal working for Lady Bullseye; she has been on the run since. Lunella finally understands her and they work together to defeat Lady Bullseye. When Maria Hill arrives to pick up Zakiya, Lunella instead offers an outreach program for her. Zakiya begins working at Bubbe Bina's bakery, fulfilling her dream.
21	5	"Kid Kree"	Samantha Suyi Lee; Samir Barrett (co-director)	Maggie Rose	Samir Barrett, Sixiao Tang & Yunhao Zhang	February 17, 2024	205	0.19
Lunella meets Marvin, a mysterious boy who turns out to be a Kree child named Mel-Varr, who was sent to Earth to capture Moon Girl and prove himself to his father, Pad-Varr. Lunella and "Marvin" end up befriending one another over their shared interest in science, while their alter egos battle one another on the streets. Lunella discovers Mel-Varr's true identity, saddening both of them, as Mel-Varr genuinely liked her. As Pad-Varr comes to pick up his son, Lunella admits that she still likes him, and Mel-Varr finally impresses his father with his science know-how. Lunella and Mel-Varr decide to stay in touch with each other.
22	6	"The Gatekeeper"	Samantha Suyi Lee	Maggie Rose	Samir Barrett, Sixiao Tang, Yunhao Zhang & Jordan K. Rosato	N/A (Note: This episode was produced as the sixth episode of the second season, but was left unaired due to its LGBTQ+ themes. It was leaked online on November 15, 2024.)	206	N/A
IS 833's volleyball team, the Squirrels, prepare to face off against the Lady Leopards. Upon learning that the Squirrels' captain—Brooklyn—is transgender, the Leopards' coach—Greer—attempts to have her disqualified from playing. When this fails, Greer uses a key that she purchased from a supervillain's yard sale to transform the Squirrels' locker room into a shape-shifting escape room, with the team and Lunella locked inside; a hologram of Greer explains that they must "follow [her] rules" and find twenty keys in order to escape. Despite finding the keys, the room does not let them out, since Brooklyn's gender identity falls outside the confines of Greer's "rules". Instead, the team forcibly breaks through the bounds of the escape room, banding together and reaching the exit. Greer is removed from the court for her bigotry, and the Squirrels are able to begin the game.
23	7	"Wish-Tar"	Samantha Suyi Lee	Halima Lucas	Samir Barrett, Sixiao Tang & Yunhao Zhang	February 17, 2024	207	0.12
Lunella and Casey try to keep up with the trends started by rapper Bobby the Myth. When the Lafayettes purchase a machine called Wish-Tar, Lunella learns that the Beyonder has possessed it and wants to help her. He grants her every wish, before finally wishing for Bobby the Myth to play at Roll With It. When Bobby asks for a new piano, Lunella wishes for the "baddest" piano, but the new model ends up turning Bobby evil. Lunella angrily tells the Beyonder to go away, forcing Lunella and Devil to defeat Bobby and returning him back to normal. Lunella decides to no longer jump to follow trends, before wondering what happened to the Beyonder.
24	8	"Make It, Don't Break It!"	Annie J. Li	Story by : Halima Lucas; Teleplay by : Taylor Vaughn-Lasley	Chivaun Fitzpatrick, Jessica Lin & Kalen Aris Whitfield	February 24, 2024	208	0.14
IS 833 gets a new science teacher, Dr. Akonam Ojo from Wakanda. Lunella gets Dr. Ojo to sponsor her for the RobotWarz competition, but finds her methods to be harsh and demeaning. Dr. Ojo explains that she wants her to be her best, and Lunella makes a more satisfactory robot. However, when her robot comes apart, Lunella has a panic attack just as Big Wheel arrives, forcing Devil and the STEM kids to fight and defeat him. Casey and Mimi get Lunella to think clearly, and she tells off Dr. Ojo, who admits that her methods were unfair. She invites Lunella to join her top secret group, but Lunella decides to join the STEM kids instead.
25	9	"The Devil You Know"	Christine Liu	LaGina Hill	Jules Bridgers, Lidia Liu, Morgan Hillebrand & Shanelle Wang	February 24, 2024	209	0.11
Lunella and her family go on a road trip for the weekend, leaving Devil to feel bad over the fact that she cannot tell her family about him. He finds a support group for other animals, led by Pebble, the former sidekick to Granite, and has fun with them. Devil later realizes that they are irresponsible troublemakers, and puts his foot down when Pebble demands that they destroy Granite's base. They fight until Granite returns. Granite reveals to Pebble that their falling-out was due to a misunderstanding, and they make up. Lunella returns and apologizes to Devil about his secrecy, promising that she will make the effort to introduce him to her family.
26	10	"In the Heist"	Christine Liu	Liz Hara	Jules Bridgers, Morgan Hillebrand & Lidia Liu	March 2, 2024	210	0.16
While visiting the museum, Lunella and the STEM kids become curious about a gem. Lunella recognizes it as Kree and calls Mel-Varr, who reveals that it can cause weather-type disasters. Lunella convinces the STEM kids to help steal it, but must avoid the museum curator Dr. Stern, who is onto their scheme. Anand nearly ruins their plan due to his self-demoralizing, but Lunella coaxes him to help. In the end, the kids successfully abscond with the diamond, replacing it with a fake, and Dr. Stern is fired. Afterward, Lunella delivers the diamond to Mel-Varr.
27	11	"Dog Day Mid-Afternoon"	Annie J. Li; Chivaun Fitzpatrick (co-director)	Maggie Rose	Chivaun Fitzpatrick, Jessica Lin & Shanelle Wang	March 2, 2024	211	0.23
In preparation for the annual dog show, Pops finds an unusual dog, who he names Franklin. Lunella quickly discovers that Franklin is not normal, and after following him one night, believes that he is trying to kidnap other dogs. At the dog show, a chase ensues that ends with Lunella, Pops, Devil, and Casey learning that Franklin can talk and is an alien trying to take down Kat Swan, the organizer behind the show and the true culprit—thanks to a dog whistle she uses to rob banks. The group work together and defeat Kat. Franklin gives Pops a tearful goodbye before taking Kat away to face her crimes on his planet.
28	12	"Roller Jam!"	Samantha Suyi Lee; Samir Barrett (co-director)	Roxy Simons	Samir Barrett, Sixiao Tang & Yunhao Zhang	March 9, 2024	212	0.18
The Lafayettes hold their annual Roller Jam, but Lunella accidentally invites Vernell Lewis, Pops' former friend turned rival. The two were blading partners, but broke up due to a disagreement. Lunella attempts to bring them both together, but neither is willing to admit defeat and hold a skate off to determine who will continue skating. Their competition is put off by the arrival of Brian Glory, Blue Streak, who wants to prove himself the best by beating Moon Girl. Lunella teams up with Pops and Vernell, who finally put aside their differences, to defeat the deranged villain and become friends again.
29	13	"Dancing With Myself"	Christine Liu; Morgan Hillebrand (co-director)	Liz Hara	Jules Bridgers & Lidia Liu	March 9, 2024	213	N/A
Lunella is interested in going to the middle school dance with her friends, but when they all find dates, she begins to feel left out. Mel-Varr suddenly arrives, trying to escape General Hyles and the Zingaran Army, and Lunella asks him to go with her. When Hyles arrives to kidnap Mel-Varr, Lunella learns that her friends were also nervous about dating and realizes that it is okay to not be ready. Lunella and Mel-Varr suit up as Moon Girl and Kid Kree and fight and defeat Hyles and his army. Lunella and Mel-Varr decide to remain friends for the time being while Mel-Varr forms a friendly rivalry with Eduardo, who also has a crush on Lunella.
30	14	"Family Matters"	Annie J. Li	Halima Lucas	Luz Batista, Chivaun Fitzpatrick, Jessica Lin, Travis Marks & Shanelle Wang	March 16, 2024	214	0.18
While struggling with revealing her double life to her family, Lunella encounters the superhero Turbo doing battle with Silvermane, who is after her armor. The two of them team up and eventually capture the villain and send him to S.H.I.E.L.D. Turbo reveals her origin and the fact that she and her mother, Erma, have not spoken in a long time as she has neglected to bring up her double life. Silvermane escapes and kidnaps Erma, but Lunella and Turbo transfer his consciousness to a stuff toy. Moved by her experience with Turbo and not wanting to make the same mistakes as her, Lunella finally sits her family down to tell them the truth.
31	15	"The Molecular Level"	Samantha Suyi Lee	Liz Hara	Samir Barrett, Luz Batista, Sixiao Tang, Yunhao Zhang & Waymond Singleton	March 16, 2024	215	0.17
Lunella finally tells Adria, James Jr., and Pops that she is Moon Girl, but the family does not believe her until Devil shows up. Mimi reveals that not only did she know already, but that she was a former scientist as well. As Lunella explains that there is no reason for them to be afraid of anyone else knowing her identity, their home is suddenly attacked by Molecule Man. He reveals that he could not find the Beyonder, so he decided to go after Moon Girl instead. Molecule Man entraps the family, and Lunella is pushed to her limit. With Devil's help, she rescues her family, and helps Molecule Man by reminding him the reason he created his planet. Changed by the events, Molecule Man apologizes to Lunella, uses his powers to rebuild her house, and returns home. While the Lafayettes are grateful for Lunella's superheroics, Adria forbids her from doing them anymore.
Part 2
32	16	"Moon Girl, Grounded"	Christine Liu	Liz Hara	Jules Bridgers & Lidia Liu	February 6, 2025	216	N/A
With Adria forbidding Lunella from being Moon Girl, she creates a robotic clone of herself dubbed Schmoon Girl to act in her place. However, Adria accidentally exposes Schmoon Girl as a robot and extends Lunella's grounding. Meanwhile, Rat King, Stiletto, Instantanegirl, and Blue Streak come together as the Felonious Four to gain control over the Lower East Side. When Adria finds Lunella trying to sneak out, she relents and lets her battle the villains. Upon returning home, Adria soullessly refuses to acknowledge Lunella's heroics, leaving Lunella feeling relieved, yet empty inside.
33	17	"Ride Along"	Annie J. Li	LaGina Hill	Chivaun Fitzpatrick, Jessica Lin & Shanelle Wang	February 6, 2025	217	N/A
Worried that her dad, James Jr., will drift away from her like her mom when he realizes that he's never had a "Moon Girl moment" like the rest of the family, Lunella decides to have him tag along during her crime fighting, where he is dubbed Jazzy J and given powered rollerblades. However, his clumsiness allows Rockin' Rudy to escape and frees Beetle from SEAL, with Maria Hill scolding him. In an attempt to help James, Casey works with Torg and Geri to pose as a group of chicken-themed villains to fabricate a "Moon Girl moment" for James, as he "defeats" one of them. Unfortunately he lets the win get to his head, getting him and Lunella captured by Beetle. Lunella admits to James that she fabricated his victory and apologizes, but he lets her know that their connection will never be broken, as they manage to free themselves and defeat Beetle.
34	18	"Lava Actually"	Annie J. Li	Angelica Weaver	Chivaun Fitzpatrick, Jessica Lin & Shanelle Wang	February 15, 2025 (Note: This episode was first released on Disney+ on February 7, 2025.)	218	N/A
Mimi finally invites Merle and Matsuye to meet the family; however, their scientific tales and jokes become too much for Pops to comprehend. Believing he is not smart enough for Mimi, Pops convinces Lunella to create a temporary mind-enhancing potion that increases his intelligence, but his newfound smarts make him too prideful, resulting in Mimi deciding to give herself some space from him. In an effort to redeem himself, Pops rebuilds a device Mimi and her friends worked on in the past, an anti-earthquake machine, but it grows out of control and causes lava to spew from the Earth's mantle, and at the same time, the potion's effects wear off, forcing him to admit the truth to his wife and her friends. As Lunella suits up as Moon Girl to help civilians, Mimi and Pops manage to reconcile as they repair the machine with duct tape. During the credits, some of the lava goes through Rat King's lair.
35	19	"Full Moon"	Samantha Suyi Lee	Liz Hara	Jules Bridgers, Travis Marks and Sixiao Tang	February 15, 2025	219	N/A
With tensions still stiff between Lunella and Adria, things begin to look up when Lunella suddenly experiences her first period, and Adria plans a mother-daughter bonding day to gather items for future periods. At the same time, Devil picks up a plant mutated by a mysterious meteor to make into tea, but it comes to life and attacks him. At a salon, Lunella and Adria begin to rekindle their relationship, but the plant begins rampaging on the streets. Lunella tries to stop it and save Devil but is too distracted with trying to appease Adria. Realizing how much this is hurting Lunella, Adria apologizes for her earlier reaction and reassures her daughter that she will love every part of her. She does provide Lunella with a CD player to replace her tape player allowing Moon Girl to destroy the plant as Adria fully accepts her daughter's superhero life. A party to celebrate Lunella's period is held involving the right plant as she gets a new scanner.
36	20	"Crushed"	Christine Liu	Liz Hara	Jules Bridgers & Lidia Liu	February 22, 2025	220	N/A
Due to his crush on Lunella, Eduardo begins acting strange around her, much to Lunella's confusion. Meanwhile, Casey sets up a new Moon Girl hotline to better handle the superhero job. Lunella receives a call from Eduardo, who asks her for dating advice, which leads to Lunella discovering his crush on her. As a result, Lunella attempts to avoid him to keep from hurting his feelings by rejecting him, and she lies to him about having a boyfriend. To keep up the charade, she transforms her failed Bobby the Myth clone into a 80s-style heartthrob named Corey, bringing him along to a party Eduardo is hosting. However, things grow out of control as a spilled drink causes Corey to malfunction and attack Eduardo, going on a rampage. As Lunella tries to help him, she admits to him that she doesn't want to date him, allowing him to understand her feelings. Lunella suits up to stop Corey as Eduardo distracts him with a dance fight, allowing Moon Girl to defeat him; Lunella and Eduardo remain friends, but the former is left downtrodden as Eduardo develops a newfound crush on Moon Girl instead.
37	21	"To Intervention and Beyond-er"	Samantha Suyi Lee	Crescent Imani Novell	Sixiao Tang & Yunhao Zhang	February 22, 2025	221	N/A
Lunella is content in her current balance of her superhero/everyday life but is still upset over her strained relationship with the Beyonder. Meanwhile, the depressed Beyonder crashes at Devil Girl's lab, where she lures him to a sandwich joint in the L.E.S. to make amends with Lunella. When he attempts to return Devil Girl home, his powers go haywire, causing several spatial disasters across the city. Casey deduces that the Beyonder's powers stem from his emotions, and in order for them to work properly, he and Lunella must mend their relationship; as Casey tries to get them to work their feelings out, they both express their aggressions at one another, allowing them to both apologize and forgive each other. However, the Beyonder's attempt to fix the damage results in a race of dangerous bio-mechanical insects called Paramites invading the city. The Beyonder attempts to erase his memory of Moon Girl to regain control of his powers, but she stops him and gives him a chance, finally blossoming their friendship and allowing the Beyonder's powers to reverse the damage.
38	22	"A Devil-ish Birthday"	Annie J. Li	LaGina Hill	Chivaun Fitzpatrick, Jessica Lin & Shanelle Wang	March 1, 2025	222	N/A
At a live Q&A event, everyone on the Lower East Side discovers that Devil does not know when his birthday is, leaving him saddened. His animal friends at the ABC Club throw a surprise party, but the party gets tough when the Lafayettes and Casey throw a party also. To attend both parties at once, Devil uses Lunella's experimental clone patches to clone himself, periodically swapping places. However, when Clone Devil eats a cake, his molecular system goes haywire, causing him to destroy the party, and as Devil confronts the clone, is caught by Moon Girl, Casey, and the ABC Club. Clone Devil ends up sticking himself with more clone patches and multiplying all over the city, and the group teams up to round them up. After Clone Devil is stopped, Devil enjoys his "birthday" with his friends.
39	23	"Party Girl"	Annie J. Li	LaGina Hill	Chivaun Fitzpatrick, Ashe Jacobson & Shanelle Wang	March 1, 2025	223	N/A
After a recent victory, a civilian gives Lunella a piece of vibranium as a reward. Overjoyed at the rare prize, Lunella uses it to upgrade her tech but runs out halfway, prompting she, Casey and Devil to take up a series of side jobs to gain funds. When they fail to raise enough, the three decide to open a party service, where Moon Girl and Devil make appearances at birthday parties. The extra funds allow Lunella to upgrade all of her tech with vibranium, but her powered-up gadgets cause the party service to suffer a downspiral, forcing Casey to close the business. Against both Casey's and Adria's warnings, Moon Girl attends a party at a high-rise, only to fall into a trap set by arrogant billionaire Mister Negative. When he strips Moon Girl of her vibranium tech, she uses gear recreated from trash to defeat him, allowing Lunella to learn her lesson.
40	24	"Guess Who's Coming to Dinner"	Samantha Suyi Lee	Liz Hara	Travis Marks, Sixiao Tang & Yunhao Zhang	March 8, 2025	224	N/A
After busting the mad scientist Dr. Madness, Moon Girl receives an offer from Maria Hill to join S.H.I.E.L.D. on a special mission, leaving her conflicted as it means leaving her family and home. When Casey and the Lafayettes notice Lunella's change in demeanor, they become worried. Adria's attempt to pry the truth from her daughter leads to her meeting the Beyonder who has come to visit Lunella to learn about the concept of family. After discovering his expansive knowledge, Adria invites the Beyonder to dinner with the family to convince him to tell the Lafayettes about Lunella's issues while Devil goes to attend a sleepover. However, he causes chaos among Adria, James Jr., Pops, and Mimi by enchanting them into revealing their secrets and teaches them a lesson about giving someone time to truly share what they are thinking, allowing them to sympathize with Lunella. As the dinner returns to normalcy, Lunella tells Casey about the S.H.I.E.L.D. offer, but decides not to tell her family yet.
41	25	"Shoot for the Moon"	Christine Liu; Morgan Hillebrand (co-director)	Halima Lucas & Crescent Imani Novell	Luz Batista, Jules Bridgers, Chivaun Fitzpatrick, Travis Marks, Lidia Liu & Shanelle Wang	March 8, 2025	225	N/A
Conflicted about the offer to join a S.H.I.E.L.D. mission, Lunella Lafayette (Moon Girl) fantasizes about being honored at the White House alongside famous heroes like Ant-Man, Captain America, Captain Marvel, and Hulk. She and Devil Dinosaur attend a graduation ceremony for the Good Word Program, an initiative which has successfully rehabilitated many villains they have encountered. The event is crashed by a bomb attempt, which Moon Girl and Devil Dinosaur prevent it. A second bomb attempt is found in New Jersey, which they set out to neutralize. On the way there, Lunella reflects on the S.H.I.E.L.D. offer. She finds the bomb on a bridge. They found out that the villain Decoy, previously apprehended by Moon Girl, set up the bomb as a trap to carry out his true plan: steal the Athena Ray (S.H.I.E.L.D.'s cloning device) and take control of the Lower East Side. With Agent Maria Hill and her team captured, Moon Girl and Devil escape and return to stop Decoy. Moon Girl is nearly overwhelmed by Decoy's clones in the battle, but the Good Word Program graduates arrive to aid her and defeat Decoy together, saving the Lower East Side. Realizing she can leave her community in good hands, Lunella accepts the S.H.I.E.L.D. mission. She shares an emotional farewell with her friends and family before departing with Devil Dinosaur aboard a transport shuttle.

== Shorts ==
=== Chibi Tiny Tales ===
Chibi Tiny Tales is a series of shorts that depict characters from various Disney Channel properties in chibi-style animation. In June 2023, the series began releasing shorts based around Moon Girl and Devil Dinosaur.

No.	Title	Original release date
1	"Hot Dog!"	June 3, 2023
2	"Perilous Parade"	July 1, 2023
3	"Carnival Carnivore"	August 1, 2023
4	"Lunella Puts it Together"	November 15, 2024
5	"Me and Mimi"	January 4, 2025

=== How NOT To Draw ===
No.	Title	Original release date
1	"How NOT To Draw: Moon Girl"	September 4, 2023

=== Theme Song Takeover ===
No.	Title	Original release date
1	"Devil Theme Song Takeover"	January 29, 2024

=== Moon Girl's Lab ===
A musical series which showcases Moon Girl using scientific concepts to take down bad guys.

No.	Title	Original release date
1	"Adaptations"	June 11, 2024
Lunella and Devil are chasing the Bone Raider within the museum. Lunella orders Devil to use his "adaptations" and proceeds to explain, through rap, what adaptations are and how they help with everyday life for him. Together, they capture Bone Raider and Lunella promises to explain how Devil is related to a chicken.
2	"States of Matter"	June 28, 2024
Lunella and Devil are battling Vicente Cimetta, the matter shifter, in an ice cream factory. Lunella decides to explain to Devil how his powers work and they work together to literally put him on ice. Afterwards, Devil sneaks off to eat the ice cream in the factory.
3	"Plants"	July 5, 2024
Lunella buys a greenhouse thanks to Casey finding a good discount on it, only to discover that it houses a sinister plant monster. Lunella realizes that it needs TLC and raps about plants need for sunlight, water, and fresh dirt. Casey, who wanted to do a photoshoot, winds up covered in dirt and Devil's mucus after he sneezes.
4	"Forces & Motion"	July 12, 2024
Lunella and Devil once again run into Rockin' Rudy who speeds off. Lunella decides to use the method of forces and motion. They manage to successfully get Rudy to crash his vehicle, but he calls a backup vehicle and escapes. Luckily, Lunella and Devil manage to get the money he stole back.
5	"Light"	July 19, 2024
Lunella, Devil, and Casey chase Nox to Coney Island. Using her new Sun Blaster, which Nox and Casey feel is brand confusion, Lunella raps about light and uses it to defeat Nox. She comes up with a new name, but it is too long, causing Casey to embrace Sun Blaster.
6	"Echolocation"	July 26, 2024
Lunella and Casey are in the subway listening to subway musicians when Flying Fox appears and steals their money. Using her knowledge of echolocation, Lunella manages to trace where Flying Fox is and sets a trap using foam to block out her sound, trapping her and delivering her to justice.
7	"Coding"	August 2, 2024
While enjoying an outdoor concert by Bobby the Myth, the public is attacked by the Gammadroid, a creation of the Mad Thinker's. Lunella sings a song about coding and locates Gammadroid's code for destroying and replaces it with dancing, saving everyone.
8	"Save the Moon"	August 9, 2024
While admiring the moon, Lunella and Devil are accosted by Beyonder who sends an asteroid towards it. Lunella explains the moon's importance to Earth's ecosystem and they successfully destroy the asteroid, with Beyonder claiming that he did it so Devil can be educated, though he still thinks the moon is made of cheese.

== Production ==
=== Development ===
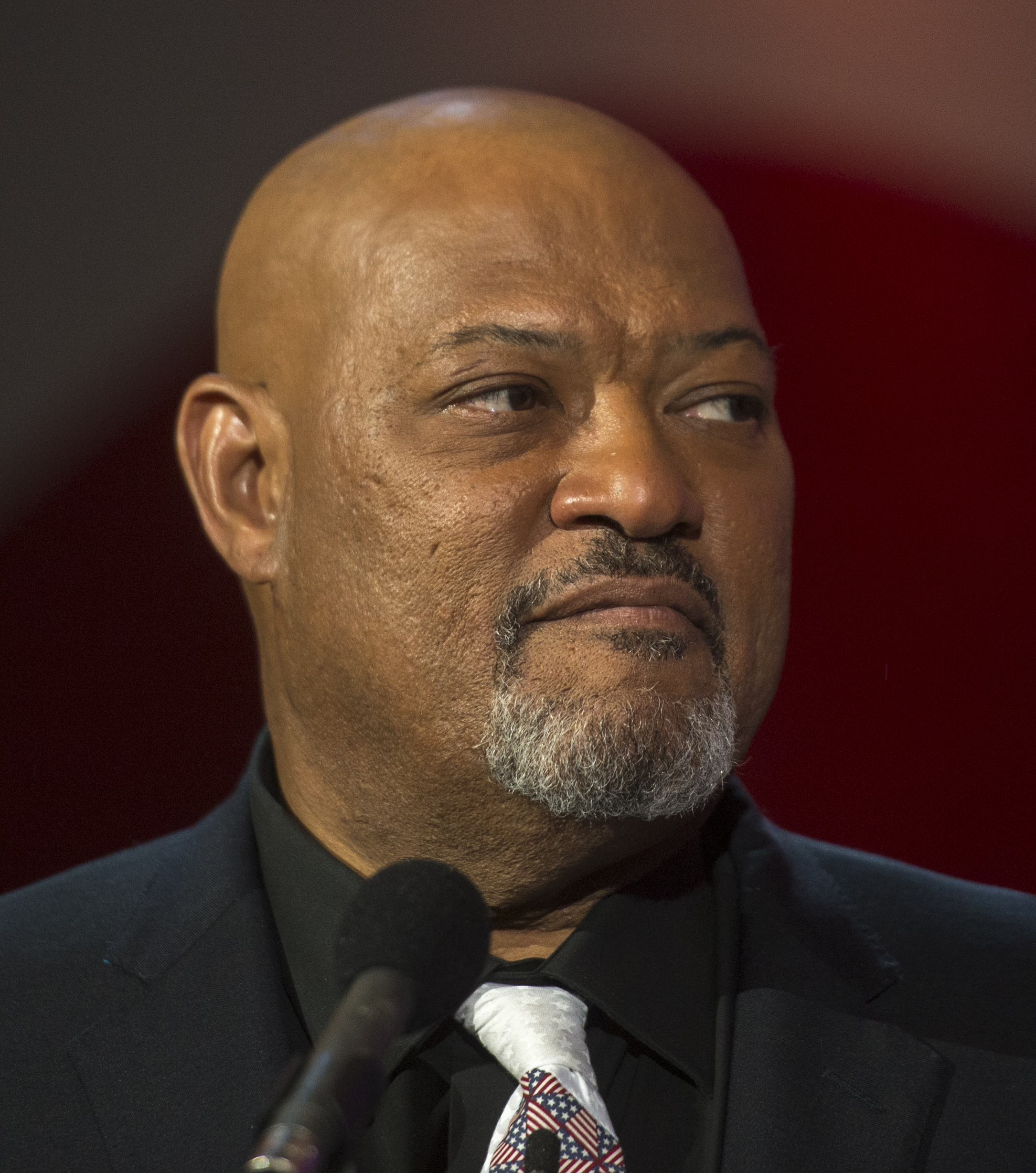
Executive producer Laurence Fishburne in 2017

During discussions with Marvel Studios regarding a potential collaboration with Cinema Gypsy Productions for a Marvel Cinematic Universe (MCU) project, president Louis D'Esposito showed actor and comic book fan Laurence Fishburne the comic book series Moon Girl And Devil Dinosaur. Having read the original Moon-Boy and Devil Dinosaur comic book as a child, Moon Girl piqued Fishburne's interest. He afterwards began reading the comics, which gave him the inspiration to create an animated series adaptation based on the duo. Fishburne and a production team worked on the series for two years at Disney Television Animation, before hiring Steve Loter as executive-producer due to his experience on female-centered shows such as Disney's Kim Possible. Loter and the team then created a roller-skating sequence played over "Sweatpants" by Childish Gambino as a proof-of-concept piece and pitched it to both executives at Disney Television Animation and a Marvel Studios team including Brad Winderbaum and president Kevin Feige, who greenlit the series for development.

On February 20, 2018, it was reported that Marvel Animation and Cinema Gypsy Productions were developing a Moon Girl and Devil Dinosaur series for Disney Channel Worldwide. Fishburne (a long-time Marvel alumni; having played Silver Surfer in Fantastic Four: Rise of the Silver Surfer and Bill Foster in Ant-Man and the Wasp) and Helen Sugland serve as the series' executive producers. 20 half-hours were ordered for the first season, but it was later cut down to 17.

On August 24, 2019, during the D23 Expo, Fishburne revealed that the series would premiere in 2020 on Disney Channel, with Disney Television Animation being set to co-produce the series, marking the first time Disney and Marvel worked together on an animated series. Loter executive produces the series alongside Fishburne and Sugland; Loter also serves as the series' showrunner. Jeff Howard and Kate Kondell work on the series as co-producers and story editors. Howard and Kondell were the first two writers hired for the series. The two helped the production team define the characters, with an hour being dedicated to a specific character. By the time writing for the episodes started, the characters were defined enough that not many ideas were revised. Kondell also serves as head writer for the series.

Fishburne said that "Disney Channel is the perfect platform to explore this pint-sized female African American superhero and [he] can't wait for their audience to enjoy the lighthearted adventures of Lunella and Devil Dinosaur", while Cort Lane, Marvel Family and Entertainment's then-senior vice president, said that "[Moon Girl's] adventures with giant buddy, Devil Dinosaur, are filled with so much wonder and joy, and this historic partnership with Disney Television Animation and Cinema Gypsy Productions proved the right formula to bring them to television".

In February 2021, it was reported that Rodney Clouden would serve as supervising producer for the series, while Pilar Flynn would produce. Due to Disney Television Animation's studios having closed in 2020 in response to the COVID-19 pandemic, most of the series was produced remotely. The producers developed each episode with a feature film-like pipeline, with each script receiving a "color script" as with films, and each episode being treated as a "mini-movie". The producers wanted the team to be composed of people with different filmmaking experiences.

In October 2022, the series was renewed for a second season. The series was renewed after a positive reception from both Disney and Marvel executives. Rafael Chaidez took over as producer for season two, while Flynn and Clouden serve as co-executive producers alongside Kondell. Kondell also serves as story editor alongside Halima Lucas, the latter who also became a co-producer alongside Ben Juwono, who replaced Clouden as supervising director. Flynn was also promoted to co-showrunner alongside Loter. Production for season 2 began by February 2023.

Loter said that the production team envisions the series to span three seasons, believing they could tell a complete story within that timeframe while remaining open to the possibility of creating more seasons. He also mentioned that the show's renewal or cancellation depends on the ratings of the season 2 premiere on both Disney Channel and Disney+.

=== Writing ===
The series is composed entirely of women of color in its writers' room, as well as on its directing team, as the producers wanted the production team to reflect the diversity within New York City, where the show is set. The writers, alongside other crew members of color, were allowed to provide feedback regarding representation of minorities within the show, with some of said crew members receiving promotions within the crew while working on the series. The crew also worked alongside Disney production coordinator Allen March to identify moments to add diversity to the show via background or speaking characters, as well as to calculate the representation per episode. Loter, who lives in New York City, said that it was important for the crew to "make sure they've got New York right", wanting to respect the city's "vibe" and "tone". He also reused elements of the series' portrayal of NYC from his cancelled Cars spin-off film Metro, such as prominently featuring the New York City Hall station, which appears in the series as Lunella's lab. The series starts off with an episodic format as it explores Lunella becoming Moon Girl, before transitioning into a more serialized story, with an arc unfolding throughout the first season, and continuing on into the second season, being more serialized than the first.

Supervising producer Rodney Clouden said it was important for the production crew to accurately portray a multigenerational African-American family. They wanted to show both Moon Girl learning from her family and her family learning from her through their multiple perspectives. Each character was given a different personality and profession, such as Pops being owner of a roller-skate and Andria being a DJ, to further explore diversity and how "everyone is so different [from each other]". Sasheer Zamata, who voices Lunella's mother, said that family is a crucial theme in the show, and described the series as "a nice way to see a Black family work together and enjoy each other and spread love in their community". Producer Pilar Flynn said it was important for the writers to have Moon Girl and Casey have a close and supportive relationship, which is rarely seen among female friendships in animation.

The producers used the original comic as "a springboard" and "a point of reference" for the series, although making several alterations regarding the source material to make the story fit in a television format while still incorporating nods to multiple comic-book storylines. According to Diamond White, the series features "levels of emotions" that were absent from the original comic. The series portrays the relationship between the duo as "a partnership" instead of "a pet/owner dynamic", with Devil becoming fiercely loyal to Moon Girl and feeling "at home with her" due to how she treats him. Another changes were the increased role of Lunella's family and the addition of her friend Casey, which were made to showcase how Lunella's world changes as she grows through the series. They also felt it was important for Lunella to have a support system, and for her household to represent that of many audiences' households. The producers changed Lunella's age from 9 to 13-years-old because they wanted social media to play a prominent role in her character, which they felt would not work with her being 9-years-old.

The series features several obscure characters from Marvel comics. The characters included were selected due to potential roles they could play in the story, interest from the producers, and/or recommendations from Marvel, such as the Beyonder, who was suggested by Marvel Studios president Kevin Feige as a foil for Lunella; the producers were particularly interested in featuring characters that hadn't been adapted to other media before, such as Aftershock, as their obscurity allowed the creators to make changes that fitted within the show's narrative, though more prominent Marvel characters are also set to appear. Fishburne noted, however, that some characters were unable to appear due to "proprietary issues", such as Amadeus Cho, whom the team wanted to include in season 1 but were forbidden by Marvel; elements of the team's plans for the character were ultimately used for Kid Kree in season 2. Elements from Marvel comics appeared more prominently later in the series, after Lunella and "her world" were properly established. Some of the villains represent real-life issues within the show, such as Aftershock draining the Lower East Side's energy in the first episode, which serves as "a statement" about gentrification. The series was also described as "complimentary" to the MCU, with the creators including multiple nods to the franchise through the series. Fishburne claimed that the series is not "connected to the MCU officially", while Loter revealed that "a couple of MCU characters" would appear in the series. Additionally, Flynn stated that the producers consider the series a "companion series" to the MCU but not part of the franchise.

=== Casting ===
In February 2021, it was reported that White and Tatasciore would voice the titular duo, with Woodard, Williams, Zamata, and Fowler providing the voices of Lunella/Moon Girl's grandparents and parents, respectively, and Barer as her best friend, Casey. It was also reported that Fishburne would voice The Beyonder in a recurring capacity. Additional recurring and guest roles were announced at San Diego Comic-Con in July 2022. White was cast shortly after Loter heard her audition tape; according to Loter, her tape was the only one he heard, as he was impressed with her performance.

Voice recordings for season one were partially done remotely due to the COVID-19 pandemic. Williams, whose work on the show was his first role during the pandemic, received help from his wife to prepare to record his lines from their home. White and Barer ad-libbed several dialogues between Moon Girl and Casey, with the two recording their lines simultaneously either physically or through Zoom. White also recorded some of her lines with Tatatsciore, as well as with Woodward, Zamata, and Williams. While providing the vocal effects for Devil, Tatasciore was given a script with lines for him, which he would later work into animal vocals. The idea of Fishburne voicing the Beyonder was suggested by Loter. For his performance, Fishburne wanted it to be lighter and less recognizable than his previous roles, so he and Loter worked together to develop his voice for the Beyonder.

=== Animation ===
The series is animated by Flying Bark Productions, in Sydney, Australia. Titmouse worked on early visual development for the series. Flying Bark, whose employees were fans of the source material, was hired due to the studio's work on Rise of the Teenage Mutant Ninja Turtles. Animation lead Kat Kosmala created a series of rules for the animators, among them being that the character animation must draw the viewers' attention, the action must be "simple and direct", and simplification should be used only for designs. The visual style is meant to "[lean] heavy into [a] 2D graphic comicbook sensibility". The animation combines hand-drawn animation with Toon Boom Harmony, with Toon Boom being used for stage and head-rigging, while the bodies of the characters are hand-drawn. The producers originally planned to only use Toon Boom, but ultimately felt hand-drawn animation was also required.

Multiple animation styles were used per episode. For the New York sequences, the producers drew inspiration from graffiti artists, as well as artists such as Andy Warhol, for the series' art style, to portray New York in a more realistic style than most animated shows, while also portraying the city as its own character. Loter and Clouden drew inspiration from their childhood for the series' portrayal of NYC. Graffiti artists were hired to work on the graffiti depicted through the show to show accurate graffiti. The camera movement was also meant to evoke the feeling of a real-life city recording, with "forced tight shots" and "object obstruction". The buildings and streets were also drawn to be accurate to their real-life counterparts. The musical sequences feature a more abstract art style that is more colorful and action-focused. Flashback sequences feature a simpler graphic style with colors that "quickly enhance emotional beats".

Due to Fishburne's love of comic books, producers also wanted the animation to "feel like an illustrated moving comic book", so the artists drew inspiration from comic books from the 1970s, featuring a lack of "perfect shapes" and "edgy line work", while having a hand-drawn feel. Details such as black spots were also added so they could "[feel] like a very complete piece" even before adding color. Artists wanted to avoid using digital techniques such as motion blur, wanting instead to rely mainly on ink-and-paint techniques. The animation also drew inspiration from Spider-Man: Into the Spider-Verse, with the producers wanting the animation to be as energetic as possible within a budget for a TV series. The animators also sought for the animation to be "complimentary" to Into the Spider-Verse without recycling its animation style. Marvel Studios Animation's What If...? was also an influence on the series' visual design.

Lead character designer Jose Lopez wanted the characters to have multiple shapes that were "fun to look at", such as Moon Girl's silhouette changing when she dons her superhero outfit. He also wanted Devil Dinosaur to look like "a mean dinosaur" while also being "believable as a lovable pet". He also drew inspiration from comic strip artist Bill Watterson, of whom Lopez is a fan of. Marc Hempel and Devil's co-creator Jack Kirby were also inspirations for the art style of the show, with the artists incorporating the Kirby Krackle into the series. The artists also incorporated elements to visually represent the characters' feelings, such as manga-style "flairs", as well as emojis that were "simple and clear and direct".

=== Music ===
In July 2022, it was announced that Raphael Saadiq would serve as the executive music producer for the show. He also provided both the score and songs for the show. Loter, a fan of Saadiq, approached him to work on the project during an autograph signing. Each episode features a different song by Saadiq, depicted in-universe as part of a mix-tape Moon Girl listens to; the songs were written before animation work began so the animators could synchronize the songs to the sequence. Saadiq included different musical genres in the soundtrack to reflect the diversity within New York City. Producer Pilar Flynn described his score as "sophisticated" and "unlike anything [she has] seen in animation before", saying it "elevated the entire show to another level". According to Flynn, the crew generally pitched ideas for the score to Saadiq, only for him to discard them in favor of something different, which the producers received positively. The first episode features a song titled "Where You Come From", which Loter described as "a love letter to New York". Saadiq also wrote songs for the series' villains.

The show's theme song, "Moon Girl Magic", was performed written by Saadiq alongside Halima Lucas and Taura Stinson, and performed by White. The song was written by Saadiq with "a similar energy" to "Juice" by Lizzo, and received an "instant green-light" by the executives, which is rare for most theme songs for a television series. Saadiq said he wanted the song to be both "uplifting" and "happy", while White was excited to "bring Lunella's voice to the show in a singing way". The title sequence was storyboarded by supervising director Ben Juwono, who drew inspiration from the music video for Cyndi Lauper's "Girls Just Want to Have Fun" and storyboarded it to play to "Juice", as the theme song had not been written by that point. The song was released as a single on November 14, 2022.

A soundtrack featuring selected songs from the first season was released on February 10, 2023.

=== Censorship ===
An episode from Season 2, entitled "The Gatekeeper", was shelved from release; however, the full episode leaked on November 15, 2024. The episode revolved around the openly-transgender character Brooklyn. James Whitbrook of io9, after reviewing the leaked footage, noted that "the episode is clearly not subtle" with its focus on Brooklyn and "the explicit prejudice she faces as a trans teen who wants to participate in school sports". Artists who worked on series alleged that the episode was pulled as a result of the political climate surrounding Donald Trump winning the 2024 United States presidential election and the Republican Party winning both chambers of Congress. Michael McWhertor of Polygon reported that a Disney source stated the episode was "held" instead of banned, with that determination occurring "more than a year ago and was not based the result of recent U.S. elections". Whitbrook reported that a Disney source claimed the intent of the hold was "to ensure material doesn't potentially push ahead discussions around social issues before families can have them themselves", however, Whitbrook also commented that "it would not be the first time Disney has capitulated to right-wing systems of power by censoring its own material". Despite being unreleased, the episode won a Velma Award from the non-profit LGBT rights organization The Rainbow Project the following month.

== Release ==
Moon Girl and Devil Dinosaur premiered on Disney Channel on February 10, 2023. The series was originally scheduled to premiere in 2020, before being delayed to 2022, and later to its eventual premiere date. The first six episodes of the series were added to Disney+ on February 15, 2023, resulting in episodes 3 to 6 being released prior to their television debuts.

=== Marketing ===
A teaser trailer showing clips from the opening was released by executive-producer Laurence Fishburne on December 15, 2021. An official clip was released during San Diego Comic-Con in 2022, while the first trailer was released during the D23 Expo, where the first episode was shown to the attendees. The series' intro was released during the New York Comic Con 2022, with the first two minutes of the season premiere also being shown during the panel. A music video for the theme song was released on November 14, 2022.

Merchandising for the show will include apparel and a series of toys produced by The World of EPI and Funko Pop! that serve as tie-ins for the series. Characters from Moon Girl and Devil Dinosaur appear as limited-time meet-and-greet characters at the Avengers Campus at Disney California Adventure starting from February 15, 2023, in commemoration of Black History Month. A soundtrack featuring songs from the first season, in digital and audio cassette formats, was released on January 4, 2023, by Walt Disney Records.

== Reception ==
=== Critical reception ===
On the review aggregator website Rotten Tomatoes, the first season holds an approval rating of 100%, based on 16 reviews with an average rating of 8.7/10. The site's critical consensus reads: "With dazzling visuals and punchy pacing that feel beamed straight from a child's imagination, Moon Girl and Devil Dinosaur will enthrall kids while impressing animation connoisseurs."

Joel Keller of Decider asserted, "Marvel's Moon Girl And Devil Dinosaur is a dynamic, smart, visually arresting series that has a unique girl at its center, a puppy-like dinosaur, and stories that will entertain both kids and their parents." Matthew Aguilar of ComicBook.com gave the series a 4 out of 5, writing, "Marvel's Moon Girl and Devil Dinosaur is an enchanting adventure that wears its heart and charm on its sleeve. The show carves out a corner of the Marvel universe all its own with personality for days and characters that leap off the screen, and any Marvel fan will regret missing out on this one-of-a-kind gem."

=== Awards and nominations ===
Year	Award	Category	Nominee(s)	Result	Refs
2023	TCA Awards	Outstanding Achievement in Family Programming	Moon Girl and Devil Dinosaur	Nominated	
2023	Humanitas Prize	Children's Teleplay (Live-Action or Animation)	Lisa Muse Bryant (for "Hair Today, Gone Tomorrow")	Nominated	
2023	Children's and Family Emmy Awards	Outstanding Children's or Young Teen Animated Series	Laurence Fishburne, Steve Loter, Helen Sugland, Rodney Clouden, Pilar Flynn, Jeffrey M. Howard, Kate Kondell, Rafael Chaidez and Lisa Muse Bryant	Nominated	
2023	Children's and Family Emmy Awards	Outstanding Animated Special	Laurence Fishburne, Steve Loter, Helen Sugland, Rodney Clouden, Pilar Flynn, Jeffrey M. Howard, Kate Kondell, Rafael Chaidez and Lisa Muse Bryant (for "Moon Girl Landing")	Won	
2023	Children's and Family Emmy Awards	Outstanding Voice Performance in a Children's or Young Teen Program	Laurence Fishburne	Nominated	
2023	Children's and Family Emmy Awards	Outstanding Writing for an Animated Program	Lisa Muse Bryant, Jeffrey M. Howard, Kate Kondell, Liz Hara, Halima Lucas, Maggie Rose and Taylor Vaughn Lasley	Nominated	
2023	Children's and Family Emmy Awards	Outstanding Voice Directing for an Animated Series	Sam Riegal	Won	
2023	Children's and Family Emmy Awards	Outstanding Main Title and Graphics	Sean Jimenez, Christopher Whittier, Jose Lopez, Ben Juwono, Kat Kosmala and Jen Dickinson	Won	
2023	Children's and Family Emmy Awards	Outstanding Editing for an Animated Program	Sandra Powers, Ryan Burkhard and Phil Lomboy	Nominated	
2023	Children's and Family Emmy Awards	Outstanding Casting for an Animated Program	Tatiana Bull, Aaron Drown and Jennifer Trujillo	Won	
2023	Children's and Family Emmy Awards	Individual Achievement in Animation	Kaz Aiwaza	Won	
2023	Peabody Awards	Children's/Youth	Moon Girl and Devil Dinosaur	Nominated	
2024	Annie Awards	Best TV/Media – Children	"The Beyonder"	Nominated	
2024	Annie Awards	Best Character Design – TV/ Media	Jose Lopéz (for "The Beyonder")	Won	
2024	Annie Awards	Best Storyboarding – TV/Media	Ben Juwono (for "Run the Rink")	Won	
2024	Annie Awards	Best Voice Acting—TV/Media	Diamond White (for "Moon Girl Landing")	Won	
2024	GLAAD Media Award	Outstanding Kids & Family Programming or Film – Animated	Moon Girl and Devil Dinosaur	Nominated	
2024	Humanitas Prize	Children's Teleplay	Halima Lucas (for "Ride or Die")	Won	
2025	Annie Awards	Best TV/Media – Children	"The Molecular Level"	Won	
2025	Annie Awards	Best Character Design – TV/ Media	Jose Lopéz (for "The Molecular Level")	Won	
2025	Annie Awards	Best Editorial – TV/ Media	"The Molecular Level"	Nominated	
2025	NAACP Image Awards	Outstanding Animated Series	Moon Girl and Devil Dinosaur	Nominated	
2025	Children's and Family Emmy Awards	Outstanding Children's or Young Teen Animated Series	Laurence Fishburne, Steve Loter, Helen Sugland, Rodney Clouden, Pilar Flynn, Rafael Chaidez, Laura Leganza Reynolds, Cameron Castillo, Jeffrey M. Howard and Kate Kondell	Won	
2025	Children's and Family Emmy Awards	Outstanding Writing for a Children's or Young Teen Animated Series	Kate Kondell, Halima Lucas and Liz Hara (for "Dancing With Myself")	Won	
2025	Children's and Family Emmy Awards	Outstanding Directing for an Animated Series	Samantha Suyi Lee, Ben Juwono and Jen Dickinson (for "The Molecular Level")	Won	
2025	Children's and Family Emmy Awards	Outstanding Voice Directing for an Animated Series	Sam Riegel	Nominated	
2025	Children's and Family Emmy Awards	Outstanding Editing for an Animated Program	Sandra Powers, Ryan Burkhard and Phil Lomboy	Nominated	
2025	GLAAD Media Award	Outstanding Kids & Family Programming or Film – Animated	Moon Girl and Devil Dinosaur	Nominated	
2026	Children's and Family Emmy Awards	Outstanding Directing for an Animated Series	Samantha Suyi Lee, Annie J. Li, Christine Liu and Jen Dickinson (for "Guess Who's Coming to Dinner")	Nominated	
2026	Children's and Family Emmy Awards	Outstanding Voice Directing for an Animated Series	Sam Riegel (for "Shoot for The Moon")	Nominated	
2026	Children's and Family Emmy Awards	Outstanding Writing for a Children's or Young Teen Animated Series	Liz Hara (for "Crushed")	Nominated	
2026	Peabody Awards	Children's/Youth	Moon Girl and Devil Dinosaur	Won	

== Graphic novel ==
On May 12, 2023, it was reported that a graphic novel based on the series was in development, entitled Wreck and Roll. It was released on April 2, 2024. The novel was written by Stephanie Williams with art by Asia Simone, while Scholastic published it.
