= The Gatekeeper (Moon Girl and Devil Dinosaur) =

Unaired Moon Girl and Devil Dinosaur episode

- Moon Girl and Devil Dinosaur episode
- Episode no.: Season 2 Episode 6
- Directed by: Samantha Suyi Lee
- Written by: Maggie Rose
- Running time: 21 minutes

Guest appearance
- Amy Sedaris as Coach Greer

Episode chronology
| ← Previous "Kid Kree" | Next → "Wish-Tar" |
- Moon Girl and Devil Dinosaur season 2

"The Gatekeeper" is the sixth produced episode of the second season of the animated television series Moon Girl and Devil Dinosaur. The episode was allegedly pulled due to its storyline regarding a transgender girl playing sports.

== Plot ==
The school volleyball team (Brooklyn, Tai, Fawzia, and Geri) get ready for a volleyball match, with Lunella Lafayette (Diamond White) acting as the team's water girl. Team captain Brooklyn (Indya Moore) reveals that she was forced to play for the boys' soccer team in the past, referring to it as a dark time. Greer (Amy Sedaris), the rival team's coach and mother of team captain Bella, overhears the conversation and approaches the coach, Hbrek (Fred Tatasciore) about the issue, pushing for Brooklyn to not be allowed to play. Hrbek refuses while Greer interrogates Brooklyn about her Pride flag-themed kneepads and the sticker on her water bottle with the transgender flag. Using a magical key, Greer locks the volleyball team in a recreation of their locker room with trials they need to pass in order to escape, hoping to get the team disqualified based on them not going to the match. Meanwhile, Lunella's best friend Casey (Libe Barer) is forced to delay the start of the game, with help from Devil Dinosaur (Tatasciore) and later Bella.

The team are given various tasks to retrieve keys for the door out. They pass all of the puzzles, but are still locked out as the reality resets, leading Brooklyn to realize that so long as she is on the team she would never be able to follow Greer's rules and the team would never escape, causing her to break down in tears. Her teammates console Brooklyn, reminding her of the support she always gives them, and wanting to support her in return. Although touched, Brooklyn punches the floor in a moment of rage, causing the reality around them to glitch. The team conclude that, since Greer rigged the dimension against them, they needed to break through the system rather than play by its rules. Working together, they manage to break out, defeating a large hologram of Greer with a volleyball, and successfully play the game.

== Production ==
=== Development ===
Prior to the development of "The Gatekeeper," Disney had been at the center of several controversies regarding LGBTQ people. In one such instance in 2022, they did not provide vocal support for Ron Desantis' proposed Florida Parental Rights in Education Act, leading to conflict between the two parties when Disney formally spoke against the act.

Moon Girl and Devil Dinosaur, a series targeted at children aged six through twelve, follows Lunella Lafayette protecting her neighborhood from danger alongside Devil Dinosaur, a Tyrannosaurus rex that she had accidentally brought to present day New York City. It had been celebrated for its authentic representation of black women and LGBTQ+ characters, including two non-binary characters in past episodes and a girl with two fathers, receiving 100% on Rotten Tomatoes and being praised by critics. The series' character Brooklyn had already been confirmed to be a transgender girl. The series was renewed for a second season, and "The Gatekeeper" was planned as one such episode. The latter half of the second season was set to air in 2025, with "The Gatekeeper" remaining unaired, and the series was cancelled before the second half of the season released despite having won several awards. The remainder of the series still aired.

=== Writing ===
In the episode, a rival coach attempts to disqualify a volleyball team which allows a transgender girl to play on the girls' team. It focused heavily on Brooklyn being transgender.

=== Casting and voice recording ===
Among the series' returning cast for the episode is Diamond White as Lunella Lafayette/Moon Girl, Fred Tatasciore as Devil Dinosaur and Coach Hrbek, Libe Barer as Casey, and Laurence Fishburne as the Beyonder. Tai is played by Ian Alexander, who is non-binary like their character. Amy Sedaris was cast to play Coach Greer in the episode.

=== Music ===
The episode featured the song "Unlock It" by Charli XCX and Kim Petras, which plays over its climax as Brooklyn and the team fight through Greer's system.

=== Pulled ===
In November 2024, following the results of the 2024 United States presidential election, a storyboard artist named Derrick Malik Johnson posted on the social media website Bluesky that Disney had pulled the episode "because of which party that won the recent election." Johnson expressed sadness that the episode would effectively become "lost media". A user on Reddit named Superootoro claimed to have worked on the series and verified Johnson's claim, confirming that the episode was to be centered on Brooklyn. He spoke vaguely, simply saying that paying attention to details about Brooklyn's character would lead one to conclude the reason for the cancellation.

One person who worked on the episode leaked it in its entirety onto YouTube under the username "nobiean 2", but Disney had the video blocked as a copyright violation. The episode was also uploaded to the popular media piracy website "Owlphibia." Both Superootoro's and Johnson's posts were deleted.

Disney did not publicly respond to the allegations about the episode being pulled due to transphobia. A source told multiple news websites that the decision had been made a year prior and was not the result of the political climate. They did not share a reason, but said that as part of regular review process, "We have a level of care that we take very seriously and are respectful of the role parents play in making choices for their children and having discussions on their own timeline," specifically noting the relevance of the series' age demographic. Brooklyn appeared in other episodes of the series. They added that the episode was "held" rather than banned from airing, but did not clearly say whether it would ever receive official release. However, the episode being pulled was still reported on as being due to the story focusing on Brooklyn being transgender, even months later.

== Reception ==
=== Response ===
Disney began to receive heavy criticism for pulling the episode. Social media users referred to the cancelation of the episode as ironic given the episode is about the double standards placed on transgender people, as deplorable due to an increase in violence against transgender people.

Gravity Falls storyboard artist Emma Cicirega described Disney's actions as shameful due to how late in the process the episode was apparently held and suggested that they were simply doing so for money from the Republican Party. Matt Braly described the episode as the most-needed comment, calling the cancellation cowardly. Hazbin Hotel writer Dave Capdevielle and Dana Terrace also criticized Disney, with the latter comparing the company to the villains of its own series.

The Mary Sue described Coach Greer as "full supervillain" for locking the team in the locker room. They described it as very relevant due to the controversy surrounding transgender women in sports. They added that few television series had attempted to discuss the topic prior. Despite the claims that the episode was not pulled due to its subject manner, The Mary Sue said it was disappointing that the episode was pulled at a time in which it said media portrayal of LGBTQ people is "most crucial". They expressed fear not only of direct censorship, but also of self-censorship as people might be afraid of their own episodes getting pulled. This sentiment was echoed by Collider.

LGBTQ Nation highlighted a moment from the episode in which the volleyball team rally around Brooklyn as "heartwarming." They refer to the entire episode similarly, referring to it as "heartwarming story of trans acceptance at a time when trans youth are being attacked across the country." Gizmodo similarly notes that the episode's messaging of acceptance is "not subtle," expressing a lack of surprise at the episode being revealed due to Donald Trump's then-upcoming second presidency. Polygon similarly called the messaging "unmissable." It identified themes of "prejudice, exclusion, and finding support through progressive allies" in the episode. The Verge agreed, "The episode’s messaging about embracing and celebrating people’s identities isn’t subtle, but it is fundamentally uplifting and clearly meant to emphasize the importance of respecting other people."

PinkNews analyzed the episode's villain, Coach Greer, noting that she echoes sentiment shared by people attempting to ban transgender people from playing sports, which they said mirrored real-world fears regarding Trump's presidency.

Autostraddle heavily criticized the decision, describing Disney as hypocritical for evidently supporting queer-focused stories but then pulling the episode. They praised the episode for openly discussing transgender individuals. They expressed that had the episode not been pulled, it would have been largely comforting to transgender children and provided important education to their cisgender peers. They compared the episode to The Owl House's episode "Enchanting Grom Fright," which revealed that Amity Blight had romantic feelings for Luz Noceda, noting that "Enchanting Grom Fright" was allowed to air during Trump's first presidency despite "The Gatekeeper" not being allowed to air during his second. Concluding their analysis, they were relieved the episode was leaked and able to be watched.

=== Accolades ===
The episode was awarded by the Velma Awards in the category "Best Episode (Period!) That Also Never Saw the Light of Day" for its representation of transgender stories in children's media. Award presenter Kristi Reed called the episode "a courageous work."
