= Godzilla, King of the Monsters (comics) =

American comic book series

- The cover to Godzilla, King of the Monsters #23, art by Herb Trimpe and Dan Green

Publication information
- Publisher: Marvel Comics
- Schedule: Monthly
- Format: Ongoing series
- Publication date: August 1977 – July 1979
- No. of issues: 24
- Main character: Godzilla

Creative team
- Written by: Doug Moench
- Penciller(s): Herb Trimpe (#1–3, 6–24), Tom Sutton (#4–5)
- Inker(s): Jim Mooney (#1), Frank Giacoia (#2), George Tuska (#2), Tony DeZuniga (#3–4), Klaus Janson (#5), Herb Trimpe (#6), Fred Kida (#7–13), Dan Green (#14–21, 23–24), Jack Abel (#22)
- Editor(s): Archie Goodwin (#1–11), Jim Shooter (#12–14, 18), Bob Hall (#15–17), Mary Jo Duffy (#19), Al Milgrom (#20–24)

Godzilla, King of the Monsters is an American comic book series published by Marvel Comics. Running for 24 issues from 1977 to 1979, the series starred Godzilla, a Japanese monster film character licensed from Toho. The series is set in the publishers' shared Marvel Universe and was the first ongoing American comic book based on Godzilla. (Note: The first American Godzilla comic book was a four page adaptation of the film Godzilla vs Megalon published by Cinema Shares International Distribution Corp. that was given out at movie theaters in April 1976.)

== Creation ==
While the initial cycle of Godzilla films had ended following the commercial failure of 1975's Terror of Mechagodzilla, dubbed versions remained popular attractions on American television, particularly with younger viewers. Marvel publisher Stan Lee was also a fan of the character, and arranged for a license of the character in 1976; the deal struck was for Godzilla himself only, with none of the other Toho monsters which had appeared in the film series included. Toho themselves would pay no further attention to the series.

Incredible Hulk artist Herb Trimpe was assigned to draw the series, and would later reflect on the similarities between the two characters. He was sent movie stills by Toho for reference, and attempted to keep the film version's personality by drawing Godzilla as "a guy in a rubber suit". Lee tapped Doug Moench to write it after hearing the latter wanted to work in a lighter tone following his work on Master of Kung Fu.

Lee took him to a screening of a Godzilla film which left Moench largely unimpressed; however he felt that Marvel's Silver Age audience had grown up with the company and saw Godzilla as an opportunity for the publisher to reconnect with a younger audience, and was able to successfully convince Lee of his plan. To meet the challenge of adapting the scale of the character in films to the comic book medium, Moench planned to humanize Godzilla by adding a supporting cast. To this end, and inspired by the role of children in the films, Moench devised the character of Rob Takiguchi (named after a high school friend of the writer's) to befriend Godzilla. The robot Red Ronin was also created for the series at the suggestion of Goodwin, who was aware of the success of super robots in Japan. Goodwin also came up with the plan of setting the series in Marvel's shared universe, allowing potential new readers to experience the company's other titles and appeal to other Marvel readers.

Another challenge was posed by the series being set in the Marvel Universe; having the monster consistently defeat the company's flagship superheroes would reflect badly on them. At the suggestion of Archie Goodwin, Moench used established supporting S.H.I.E.L.D. agents Dum Dum Dugan and Jimmy Woo as the Godzilla Squad (later joined by Gabe Jones) while the action avoided New York City, the hub of the company's most prominent heroes. Moench would acknowledge that this set-up still required readers to overlook why Marvel's heavy hitters took no action against Godzilla's rampages. Nick Fury, S.H.I.E.L.D.'s commander, was left out of the main cast to keep him available for guest appearances elsewhere. Moench relished the chance to give a more central role to Dugan, having been a fan of the character since reading Sgt. Fury and his Howling Commandos. One arc featured Godzilla being shrunk by Pym Particles; this was inspired by Moench's fond memories of a fight scene between a miniaturized man and a spider in science fiction movie The Incredible Shrinking Man, and his desire to devise a way Dugan and Godzilla could fight directly. While S.H.I.E.L.D. were established as Godzilla's primary adversaries numerous other Marvel characters made guest appearances, including the Fantastic Four, the Champions, Devil Dinosaur and the Avengers. The Champions, whose book was struggling for sales, were included as a personal favor to the much-loved Goodwin, while Moench felt the character was a good fit for facing off against the Fantastic Four. The inclusion of the recently cancelled Devil Dinosaur was inspired by Moench and Trimpe's admiration of Jack Kirby. Trimpe however refused Moench's suggestion of featuring the Hulk, having tired of drawing the character.

== Publishing history ==
The series ran for 24 issues between August 1977 and July 1979. During the run, toy company Mattel acquired the licence to produce merchandise based on the character as part of their Shogun Warriors line, which also featured many of the Japanese super robots which had inspired the design of Red Ronin. Impressed by Marvel's handling of Godzilla, the company made a deal to produce a Shogun Warriors comic, also by Moench and Trimpe. Despite Marvel holding the rights to both properties simultaneously they never crossed over, however - though Trimpe created promotional art for Mattel featuring Godzilla and Rodan alongside Daimos, Great Mazinger, Raydeen and Gaiking.

The first issue sold 200,000 copies. After two years of minimal communication with Marvel, Toho abruptly raised the fee for renewing the Godzilla licence. Wary of the impact it would have on the series' profitability and unwilling to sink a larger amount of money into a property they didn't own, Marvel withdrew from negotiations and Godzilla, King of the Monsters was cancelled after 24 issues.

=== After cancellation ===
A planned fill-in issue of the title by Marv Wolfman and Steve Ditko launching their Dragon Lord character was subsequently modified so Godzilla was replaced by separate monster called Wani and the story was published in Marvel Spotlight (vol. 2) #5 instead, cover-dated March 1980.

Characters from the series such as Doctor Demonicus, Yetrigar and Red Ronin would go on to appear in other Marvel titles. Demonicus was a major villain in Shogun Warriors and later appeared during Dennis O'Neil's run on Iron Man. Under the villain's control was an altered, unnamed version of Godzilla, with the story implying that Demonicus had defeated and modified his foe since the end of the series. The altered version debuted in Iron Man #193 (cover-dated April 1985) before recurring in #194 and #196 and making one final appearance in The Thing #31 in 1986. These appearances were not well received.

Following the discontinuation of Toho's deal with Marvel, the American comic license for Godzilla was dormant until 1986, when Dark Horse Comics took it up after a revival of interest in the character brought on by new film Godzilla 1985.

In 2007, Godzilla appeared in an unauthorized cameo in The Mighty Avengers #31.

In 2025, Godzilla would return to Marvel with the six issue Godzilla vs. Marvel comics event pitting Godzilla against various Marvel teams in standalone stories set in different time periods of the Marvel Universe's publishing history while incorporating more Toho monsters. Godzilla vs. Fantastic Four takes place in the 1960s with King Ghidorah becoming a Herald of Galactus, Godzilla vs. Hulk takes place in the 1970s and features Mothra, Kumonga, Mechagodzilla and Hedorah, Godzilla vs. Spider-Man takes place in the 1980s shortly after Secret Wars with Peter wearing the black symbiote suit, Godzilla vs. X-Men takes place in the 1990s with Godzilla battling a kaiju mimicking Sentinel unit, Godzilla vs. Avengers is set in the early 2000s and specifically features the New Avengers lineup recounting a battle involving Godzilla, Jet Jaguar and Fin Fang Foom in the style of Rashomon, and Godzilla vs. Thor utilizes the Godzilla, Mothra and King Ghidorah: Giant Monsters All-Out Attack version of Godzilla as the vessel for demons summoned by The Hand. A second miniseries titled Godzilla Destroys the Marvel Universe has Godzilla reawakening from a long dormant period and rampaging his way through the Marvel universe.

== Plot ==
Having been awakened and mutated by a nuclear explosion, Godzilla first appears by bursting out of an iceberg near Alaska and was soon confronted by S.H.I.E.L.D., who unsuccessfully attempted to restrain the monster with Stark Industries technology. Nick Fury tasks Dum Dum Dugan with forming a 'Godzilla Squad' to stop the kaiju, including fellow agents Jimmy Woo and Gabe Jones, scientist Doctor Yuriko Takiguchi and his grandson Robert "Little Rob" Takiguchi, and genius Tamara Hashioka. Joined by Gabe Jones, they successfully drive Godzilla back into the sea when the monster attacks Seattle. Godzilla re-emerges in San Francisco and destroys the Golden Gate Bridge before being driven off by the combined efforts of the Godzilla Squad and Champions, with Hercules able to best the monster in combat.

The Godzilla Squad then had to deal with the similar creations of the evil Doctor Demonicus, which ended up being defeated by Godzilla himself. Despite this brief alliance of convenience, the Godzilla Squad received the new Behemoth Helicarrier, together with the Tony Stark-created mecha Red Ronin to confront the monster. However, the sympathetic Rob took control of the latter, helping save Godzilla after a battle near San Diego.

Following further appearances by Godzilla - the destruction of the Hoover Dam and flooding of Las Vegas, battling mutated sasquatch Yetrigar in the Grand Canyon and fighting alongside Red Ronin against alien monsters the Beta-Beast and the Mega-Monsters-Triax, Rhiahn and Krollar (which are controlled by two warring alien races called the Betans and the Megans, respectively) in Salt Lake City. Godzilla was also incorrectly accused of cattle rustling.

In order to cut down the damage caused by Godzilla's rampages, the Godzilla Squad expose the creature to Pym particles, reducing its height to around 12 inches tall and transporting him to New York City for study. However Godzilla escapes shortly after arrival, and after battling a sewer rat begins to grow again. Rob attempts to disguise the now four-foot tall Godzilla through the city's streets in a hat and trenchcoat without success as the monster grows to seven feet and fights Dugan and Jones at the docks. With the aid of the Fantastic Four, the 20-foot and still growing Godzilla was lured to a museum but was then sent back in time. and teamed up with Devil Dinosaur and Moon Boy. Following this Godzilla reappeared full-size in Times Square, where S.H.I.E.L.D., the Fantastic Four and the Avengers attempted to steer him away from the city. In the end Rob is able to persuade Godzilla to spare the city, and return to the sea.

== Collected editions ==
The whole run was collected in a single volume of Marvel's budget price Essential series in black-and-white. In November 2023, Marvel reacquired the rights to publish the omnibus edition collecting all 24 issues of the Godzilla comic.

Title	ISBN	Release date	Contents
Essential Godzilla, King of the Monsters	9780785121534	March 15, 2006	Godzilla, King of the Monsters #1-24
Godzilla: The Original Marvel Years	978-1302958756	October 1, 2024	Godzilla, King of the Monsters #1-24

== Reception ==
In an overview of the series for Amazing Heroes, David Annandale felt the series occasionally veered towards ridiculousness, particularly the cattle rustler storyline, but felt it "was never less than entertaining" and compared it positively to some of the later entries in the original film series. He also noted that the mass property destruction without any sign of civilian casualties was "super-brawl syndrome taken to the extreme" due to the requirements of the young target audience and the Comics Code Authority.

Moench was later interviewed about writing the series for fanzine G-Fan Magazine, and discovered Godzilla fandom was evenly split between those who "loved" the Marvel version and those who felt it trivialized the character. The Marvel version of Godzilla was ranked 23rd on Den of Geek's listing of Marvel Comics' 31 best monster characters in 2015.

== See also ==
- Godzilla (comics)
