= Vanisher =

- Cover to X-Force #69

Publication information
- Publisher: Marvel Comics
- First appearance: The X-Men #2 (November 1963)
- Created by: Stan Lee; Jack Kirby

In-story information
- Alter ego: Telford Porter
- Species: Human mutant
- Team affiliations: Marauders; X-Force; Designer Gene Corporation; Brotherhood of Mutants; New Enforcers; Fallen Angels; Factor Three
- Notable aliases: El Hombre que Desaparece
- Abilities: Teleportation; Use of guns that fire gas or energy beams

Vanisher (Telford Porter) is a fictional character and mutant supervillain appearing in American comic books published by Marvel Comics. Vanisher's primary ability is teleportation. He is usually depicted as an opponent of the X-Men. The character was created by Stan Lee and Jack Kirby, and first appeared in The X-Men #2 (November 1963).

Brad Pitt portrays him in a cameo in the live-action film Deadpool 2.

== Publication history ==
The Vanisher first appeared in The X-Men #2 (November 1963), created by writer Stan Lee and artist Jack Kirby.

== Fictional character biography ==
Born in Milton, Massachusetts, Vanisher is a mutant and a professional criminal with the ability to teleport to any place imaginable. He commits a series of spectacular crimes, including building a large criminal organization, stealing confidential defense plans, and attempting to extort millions of dollars from the U.S. government. With support from a large group of non-mutant followers, he goes to the front lawn of the White House to await his payment. Professor X and the X-Men intervene when Xavier induces amnesia upon Vanisher. Vanisher, unable to teleport away, is taken into police custody while the X-Men defeat his mob.

Vanisher regains his memory and joins Factor Three, a subversive organization of mutants who seek world domination. Factor Three attempts to start World War III between the United States and the Soviet Union. After learning that their leader, Mutant Master, is an alien who intends to conquer Earth, the members of Factor Three work with the X-Men to defeat him.

Vanisher disappears for a period, but comes out of hiding to fight the Champions with the Brotherhood of Mutants. He is defeated by the Champions and is trapped in mid-teleportation by Darkstar. Half of Vanisher's body is stranded in another dimension, with the other half in Poughkeepsie, New York, where he is found by the X-Men. After returning to Earth, Vanisher organizes a group of young mutant thieves, known as the Fallen Angels. Eventually, the Fallen Angels disband and Vanisher is left to his own devices.

Vanisher later joins a second incarnation of the Enforcers, called the New Enforcers. Along with Eel and Blitz, Vanisher becomes involved in a clash between A.I.M. and Hydra.

=== X-Force ===
Vanisher is one of the few mutants who retain their superhuman powers after M-Day. He is hired to steal a vial of the Legacy Virus from one of Mister Sinister's labs, which is also sought by X-Force. In a confrontation with X-Force, Vanisher is injured and given a terminal brain tumor by Elixir to secure his cooperation in retrieving the virus. Vanisher is later forcibly inducted into the ranks of X-Force for use as transport and extraction.

When the Sapien League starts abducting mutants and infecting them with a modified version of the Legacy Virus, Vanisher teams with Warpath. He teleports X-Force to the Leper Queen and manages to disarm her, but is sent into the future by Cyclops.

=== Messiah War ===
Upon arriving in the future, Vanisher tries to teleport but his powers are blocked. He is then shot in the neck by Deadpool, but is healed by Elixir. After ambushed by Stryfe's forces, Vanisher is ordered to protect Elixir and Hope Summers. After defeating Stryfe's forces, Vanisher, Domino, X-23 and Deadpool investigate what has been blocking his powers and their time-travel devices. Together with Laura they find the problem is Kiden Nixon, who has been forced to freeze time across the United States. When Vanisher removes his time-travel device, he appears in the present at the ruins of the Xavier Institute.

=== Necrosha ===
After returning from the future, Vanisher's condition worsens. He teleports to Utopia for help and finds himself in the middle of the battle between Selene's forces and the X-Men. Vanisher meets with Elixir, who reveals that he secretly removed Vanisher's tumor while he was in the future and that Vanisher now has syphilis. After leaving, Vanisher teleports into Selene's fortress to rescue Warpath. He engages in a battle with Blink, who teleports his left arm off. After rescuing the other members of X-Force and getting them to safety, Vanisher demands to be healed. Elixir restores Vanisher's arm, but does not cure his syphilis.

=== Second Coming ===
After Cable and Hope Summers return to the present, Cyclops orders Domino and Vanisher to wait in San Francisco. Learning that Bastion was targeting teleporters to prevent Hope from reuniting with the X-Men, Cyclops gives Domino instructions to bring Vanisher back to Utopia. Hearing this, Vanisher teleports to his hideout in Portugal, but is confronted by Steven Lang and his men. Vanisher is shot multiple times and left for dead.

=== Regenesis ===
Vanisher appears in New York as a member of a group of Marauders who are brainwashed to attack the X-Men.

Vanisher later joins the Hellfire Club with Emma Frost as its Black King, but is killed by Robert Callahan.

He resurfaces during the Krakoan Age, having been resurrected through unknown means.

After the end of the Krakoan Age, Vanisher begins working for the Office of National Emergency.

== Powers and abilities ==
Vanisher is a mutant with the ability to teleport himself, his clothes, and an undetermined amount of additional mass. Apparently, Vanisher traverses the Darkforce Dimension when teleporting from one place on Earth to another. His power appears to be psionic in nature. The limits on Vanisher's teleportation range and the maximum amount of mass he can teleport with himself are unknown, but he was able to teleport himself and several others from southern California to New York without any visible strain. Vanisher has a subconscious extrasensory ability that prevents him from materializing part or all of his body within a solid object, even if he has never before been to the area he is teleporting to. This allows Vanisher to teleport with greater ease than Nightcrawler. His powers once interacted with those of Nightcrawler, sending them both into alternate dimensions.

Vanisher has used guns which shoot gas or energy beams. He also once reprogrammed Sentinel robots to do his bidding and can fluently speak Portuguese.

== Other versions ==
=== Age of Apocalypse ===
An alternate universe version of Vanisher appears in "Age of Apocalypse". This version is a servant of Apocalypse. He is ordered to retrieve Magneto's child Charles, but is confronted and killed by Charles' robotic maid Nanny.

=== House of M ===
An alternate universe version of Vanisher appears in "House of M". This version works with Pyro under the authority of Exodus as part of the mutant supremacist rulership of Australia.

=== Exiles ===
An alternate universe version of Vanisher appears in Exiles. This version is able to teleport vast distances across space.

=== Ultimate Marvel ===
An alternate universe version of Vanisher appears in the Ultimate Marvel imprint as a member of the Brotherhood of Mutants.

== In other media ==
- Two incarnations of Vanisher appear in Wolverine and the X-Men, voiced by Steve Blum. The first version makes minor recurring appearances as a member of Professor X's future X-Men while the present version makes a cameo appearance in the episode "Aces and Eights" as a Genoshan prisoner.
- Vanisher makes a cameo appearance in Deadpool 2, portrayed by Brad Pitt. This version is a mutant with invisibility. He is recruited by Deadpool and Weasel into X-Force, only to be killed on the first mission after crosswinds push him into a power line.
- Vanisher appears in The Amazing Spider-Man: Web of Fire as a member of the New Enforcers.
