= Moon Girl And Devil Dinosaur =

Ongoing series published by Marvel Comics, 2015–2019

- Textless cover of Moon Girl and Devil Dinosaur #13 (January 2017). Art by Amy Reeder.

Publication information
- Publisher: Marvel Comics
- Schedule: Monthly
- Format: Ongoing series
- Genre: Superhero
- Publication date: November 2015 – September 2019
- No. of issues: 47
- Main character(s): Lunella Lafayette / Moon Girl; Devil Dinosaur

Creative team
- Written by: Brandon Montclare; Amy Reeder
- Artist: Natacha Bustos

Collected editions
- BFF: ISBN 1-302-90005-6
- Cosmic Cooties: ISBN 1-302-90208-3
- The Smartest There Is!: ISBN 1-302-90534-1
- Girl-Moon: ISBN 1-302-90535-X
- Fantastic Three: ISBN 1-302-91099-X
- Save Our School: ISBN 1-302-91100-7
- Bad Dream: ISBN 1-302-91436-7
- Yancy Street Legends: ISBN 1-302-91437-5
- The Beginning: ISBN 1-846-53295-7
- Full Moon: ISBN 1-302-92113-4
- Bad Buzz: ISBN 1-302-92984-4
- Place In The World: ISBN 1-302-94500-9
- Menace on Wheels: ISBN 1-302-93125-3

Moon Girl and Devil Dinosaur is a superhero comic book series published by Marvel Comics, featuring Lunella Lafayette / Moon Girl and Devil Dinosaur as its main protagonists, respectively a 9-year-old Inhuman girl who is described as the smartest character in the Marvel Universe, and a dinosaur with whom she shares a mental link. Written by Brandon Montclare and Amy Reeder and primarily drawn by Natacha Bustos, the series is a direct (yet stand-alone) sequel to Moon-Boy and Devil Dinosaur by Jack Kirby. The series lasted 47 issues, from November 2015 to September 2019.

An animated television series adaptation, also titled Moon Girl and Devil Dinosaur, and starring Diamond White and Fred Tatasciore as the titular characters, aired for two seasons from February 2023 to March 2025. A brief relaunch of the comic book, subtitled Menace on Wheels, was published in 2023 as a tie-in with the series.

== Publication history ==
Moon Girl and Devil Dinosaur was created by writers Brandon Montclare and Amy Reeder (who also designed Moon Girl), and artist Natacha Bustos, launching in November 2015 as a direct sequel to the Moon-Boy and Devil Dinosaur series from Jack Kirby, hence the first villains that Moon Girl and Devil Dinosaur face being the Killer-Folk.

The genesis of the series came from editor Mark Paniccia, who was a fan of the character Devil Dinosaur and, along with editor Emily Shaw, had hired Montclare and Reeder to pen the basis for a new series that involved the character ending up in modern day. They came up with the idea of Devil Dinosaur interacting with a girl reminding him of his partner Moon-Boy and fell in love with the idea of working with a hero who wasn't a "regular cape-and-tights superhero". Reeder explains the primary inspiration for the creation of the character:

So she was just, originally this character who was kind of like Inspector Gadget, but a little less campy—a little more knowing what she's doing? You know, having gadgets come out of her backpack or whatever, and rollerskating around the city and solving crimes kind of things. And she was black. And then [Marvel] said a girl—the only difference was I made her younger, and that made her even cooler. She's somebody who's kind of awkward, a bit off the beaten path and people are not aware of her.

Artist Natacha Bustos found Moon Girl a relief from the norm of other typical superheroes. She was primarily inspired by the clear diversity that Moon Girl and Devil Dinosaur promoted, further comparing the character Lunella to herself. She compared her story to a "Ghibli one" due to the immense relationship between the title characters. Lunella Lafayette's primary gift is her advanced intelligence. She is dubbed the "smartest person in the whole world" by Amadeus Cho, implying that she is more intelligent than other geniuses in the Marvel Universe such as Valeria Richards, Reed Richards, Bruce Banner, Tony Stark, Victor von Doom, Hank Pym, and Cho himself. She uses her intelligence to build a wide variety of gadgets that she uses in battle. Her "battle armor" consists of boxing headgear, goggles, suspenders, a computerized utility belt, backpack, some minor weapons (notably her spring powered boxing glove), and a special pair of roller-skates. Lunella's Inhuman abilities allow her to switch consciousnesses with Devil Dinosaur whenever she is angry or extremely hungry. Due to her intelligence, she is also capable of speech while in his body. She also possesses some manner of enhanced strength, but according to Captain Kree it is insignificant compared to her other abilities.

Issue #47 of Moon Girl and Devil Dinosaur (released November 2019) was billed as the final issue of the series, although a limited-run relaunch of the series subtitled Menace on Wheels would see publication in 2023 as a tie-in with the self-titled animated series.

== Plot summary ==
=== Heroic beginnings ===
Lunella Louise Lafayette is a young Haitian-American girl who is the daughter of Adria Lafayette and James Lafayette. She daydreams and loves to invent. Despite possessing an astoundingly large intellect, Lunella is unable to get into better schools and attends Public School 20 Anna Silver. Her classmates make fun of her and dub her Moon Girl because of these qualities.

In the Savage Land, Devil Dinosaur and his enemies, the Killer Folk, are transported to New York by a temporal vortex, which also kills his companion Moon-Boy. Moon-Boy's dying wish was for Devil Dinosaur to reclaim the sacred Nightstone from the Killer Folk and avenge him.

Lunella later obtains the Nightstone, identifies it as a Kree Omni-Wave Projector, and intends to use it to stop her latent Inhuman genes from activating. She comes into conflict with Amadeus Cho / Totally Awesome Hulk and the Killer Folk. Lunella is caught in a cloud of Terrigen Mist and enveloped in a cocoon as her body mutates.

=== After Terrigenesis ===
Devil Dinosaur takes Lunella's cocoon to her lab and watched over it for several days until she hatched. Lunella is relieved that she had not changed physically, but is dismayed to learn her Inhuman power is switching bodies with Devil Dinosaur. While in Lunella's body, Devil Dinosaur freaks out in class and attacks other students, causing her to be ostracized.

Devil Dinosaur and Moon Girl's next opponent is Kid Kree, a misunderstood Kree boy who had failed to enter the academy twice and sought to capture an Inhuman to impress his father and make a name for himself on Earth as Captain Marvel had. He disguised himself as a human named Marvin Ellis and enrolled in Lunella's class. Moon Girl and Devil Dinosaur fight Kid Kree several times, once being separated by Ms. Marvel. Ms. Marvel recognizes their fight as a childish squabble and entrusts Moon Girl with a device to contact her if things ever got out of hand.

Lunella is then approached by Hulk, who gives her the Banner B.O.X. (Brain Omnicompetence EXaminer), and is surprised when she solves it in mere seconds, proving her to be the smartest person on Earth. After consulting experts, Moon Girl, Hulk and Devil Dinosaur encounter Mole Man, who is attacking the city with a group of monsters. The next day, at her lab, Lunella ends up having a vision of herself in the future, where she is approached by Earth's smartest heroes. After school, she is approached by the Thing, who takes her for a walk when Hulk appears. When the two start fighting, Moon Girl and Devil Dinosaur manage to contain them while protecting the civilians, until both of them are left unconscious. Meanwhile, Doctor Doom is surprised to discover that Moon Girl is considered the smartest person on Earth and vows to prove himself superior. During science class, Lunella is attacked by robot drones until she is saved by Riri Williams. They follow the drones to a nearby alley, where Moon Girl encounters Doom. After Doom escapes, Moon Girl and Ironheart go to Moon Girl's secret lab, where they discover that the energy signatures of the drones are mystic in origin. While tracing Doom's location, Moon Girl and Devil Dinosaur arrive at the Sanctum Sanctorum and are found by Doctor Strange. Waking up from a dream, Lunella is reunited with Devil, who was shrunk down by Strange. While walking back home, Moon Girl and two of her classmates are attacked by Doom and his Doombots. Moon Girl uses an enlargement potion on herself to help Strange fight Doom and his robots. A few nights later while installing an energy sensing probe, Moon Girl is found by five members of the X-Men.

Arriving at an abandoned mall, Moon Girl re-engineers a Cerebro helmet with the Omni-Wave Projector to locate Doom, only for her and the X-Men to travel back to the 1980s. Once there, Doctor Doom arrives with an army of Doombots. The X-Men and Devil fight the Doombots until Moon Girl takes off the helmet, sending them back to the present, where they discover that Doom is actually a Doombot. Lunella takes the Doombot to her lab to analyze it. Lunella later makes a major discovery about her Inhuman power: it only activates during a full moon. She then encounters an army of Doombots, along with Thing, Hulk, Ms. Marvel, Ironheart, Doctor Strange, Kid Kree, and the Killer Folk, who went to her aid after being recruited by Lunella.

=== Robot double ===
Lunella then receives a call for help from an alien girl named Illa and, after building a spaceship, goes to space with Devil and crash lands on a moon. While exploring, Lunella discovers that Illa is the moon. She soon realizes that Illa is lonely and wants company and does not understand Lunella at all. After a brief fight between Devil and giant bugs, Lunella leaves, despite Illa's objections. In the process, Lunella is sent to a parallel universe where she meets another version of herself and Devil Dinosaur. Meanwhile, the Doombot head creates robotic versions of Lunella to avoid suspicions of her absence. After fighting their counterparts, Devil Girl and Moon Dinosaur, Lunella and Devil get back on their spacecraft and return to Illa who tells them that they will never leave her. Back home, the Doombot head begins to have problems with one of Lunella's robots. Moon Girl and Devil manage to find Ego the Living Planet and reunite him with Illa, while the Doombot discovers that the Lunella robot is acting independently. Moon Girl and Devil Dinosaur later made use of a time machine to save Moon-Boy from death.

Meanwhile, the Doombot head has created multiple Moon Girl replacement robots who to his surprise are acting like real little girls. He tells them that they will be obsolete when the real Lunella returns. While up in space Lunella has united Ego and Illa as a family. On the way to Earth she uses the Omniwave projector to tearfully return Devil Dinosaur to Moon Boy in the Savage Land, where she thinks he belongs, and then returns to New York, where she tosses it away in the trash. Later, realizing that she still needs help, she begins checking out other superheroes in the search for a potential partner. She tries several while on various adventures, but this fails and when faced with the Super-Skrull she enlists the Thing and the Human Torch and uses H.E.R.B.I.E. to relocate Devil Dinosaur and bring him back in a Fantastic Four uniform of his own. They defeat Super-Skrull and Lunella realizes that she and Devil do not belong in the Fantastic Four, but that they do belong together. She apologizes for sending him away and he readily forgives her.

=== Further team ups ===
During the Monsters Unleashed storyline, Devil Dinosaur was with Moon Girl when she was studying the Leviathon attacks. Later, Kei Kawade demonstrates his abilities to the heroes present by summoning Devil Dinosaur, though Moon Girl was also brought along during Devil Dinosaur's summoning. When the Leviathon Servitors attack the Baxter Building, Kei Kawade summons Devil Dinosaur to help fight them. Moon Girl, Devil Dinosaur, and other heroes later encounter other monsters until the Leviathon Queen is defeated by Kei Kawade and his new creations.

During the Secret Empire storyline, Devil Dinosaur and Moon Girl join Daisy Johnson's Secret Warriors. After rescuing Karnak from a prison camp, the Warriors encounter the Howling Commandos after falling into a trap. While driving west, the team is found by the X-Men. After escaping New Tian, the team meets Dark Beast, an evil version of Beast, who is tortured by Daisy and Karnak on information of an Inhuman who can help them. After receiving their information, the team encounters Mister Hyde along with Hydra's Avengers. After a brief fight, the team is captured until they break out when Daisy uses her powers to destroy the Helicarrier they were in. While trying to break Devil out of his cage, Moon Girl meets Leer, the Inhuman Karnak mentioned, who knocks her unconscious when the Helicarrier crash lands. Fortunately, Moon Girl and Devil have switched minds just in time, enabling Moon Girl to lead the Warriors to an Inhuman prison camp. There, the Warriors plan a jailbreak with the imprisoned Inhumans when the Underground resistance arrives to help them. It is later revealed that Leer is Karnak's son and that Karnak had sold him to Mister Sinister to help activate his powers.

In The Unbelievable Gwenpool #25, Moon Girl, Devil Dinosaur, and the Power Pack briefly bust through the wall of the Marvel Universe's versions of Gwen's parents while she explains where she and her brother came from. They are surprisingly okay with it.

Moon Girl starred in a three part mini-series of one-shots in which she works with Spider-Man (Miles Morales), the X-Men, and the Avengers to rescue Devil Dinosaur from the High Evolutionary.

In Infinity Wars, Moon Girl is briefly merged with Squirrel Girl by the Infinity Gems, becoming Luneen Lafagreen / Moon Squirrel.

=== Dealing with Princess ===
Wilson Fisk enrolls his daughter Princess in Lunella's school. For some reason she sneaks into school and tried to steal Lunella's file, but is foiled by Moon Girl who in the middle of the fight switches with Devil. Later Lunella, happy to have Devil Dinosaur back but having to deal with all of his dinosaur issues, transforms him into a human child and enrolls him as a student, claiming he is her brother. Princess feels slighted since she did not get to enjoy being the new girl much and complains to Wilson who informs some of his villainous contacts that they may have to deal with Moon Girl while Princess tries to bully them and draw attention back to herself. When that failed she had her father send her back to her old school.

=== The S.A.D.S.A.K.s ===
Wanting to help her fellow Inhumans, Moon Girl forms the S.A.D.S.A.K.s (Support Alliance Derby for Sensationally Abled Kids) and recruits Tasha, a girl with prehensile hair; Devinder, a boy with super speed; Will, a boy with wings who can communicate with birds; and Olivia, a girl with social media influence. The group quickly become suspicious of Olivia, especially when people seem enamored with her after using a hair care product that she peddles online. Moon Girl discovers that Olivia is actually a Kree and a descendant of the scientists who created the Inhumans. In the hopes of reclaiming her family glory, she plans to use nanites embedded in her hair care products and create an army to do her bidding. Moon Girl and Devil Dinosaur rally their new allies together to defeat her.

== Characters ==
=== Main characters ===
- Moon Girl / Lunella Lafayette: A child genius who befriends Devil Dinosaur. As an Inhuman descendant, she developed the ability to switch minds with Devil Dinosaur.
- Devil Dinosaur: The famed dinosaur who entered New York City, via a portal. He is Lunella's constant companion and best friend.
- Moon-Boy: Devil Dinosaur's original partner. He was initially killed by the Killer Folk, but was saved, via time travel, by Lunella and Devil.
- Adria Lafayette: Lunella's mother who works as a prison councilor to help reform criminals.
- James Lafayette: Lunella's father who works as a nurse in the intensive care ward.
- Eduardo: Lunella's friend who claims to have seen Taylor Swift on Yancy Street.
- Zoe: One of Lunella's classmates who does not understand her or her intelligence.
- Ali: One of Lunella's classmates who is much more patient with her.
- Ms. Dominguez: Lunella's put upon teacher who struggles to understand her students. She used to smoke.
- Coach Hrbek: Lunella's good-natured, but dimwitted coach. He is indirectly responsible for bringing Devil Dinosaur and the Killer Folk to New York.
- Devinder: An Inhuman boy with the ability to move at super-speed.
- Will: An Inhuman boy who has wings and can talk to birds.
- Tasha Thomas: An Inhuman girl with prehensile hair.

=== Enemies ===
- Killer Folk: The first major threat that Lunella and Devil faced together. They are a primal tribe of ape-like beings who are savage, yet show intelligence.
- Marvin Ellis / Mel-Varr / Kid Kree: A Kree child soldier who comes to Earth to capture Lunella. He ends up falling in love with her, but she rebukes him due to their age. They apparently still stay in contact with each other.
- Princess Fisk: The daughter of Kingpin who is a spoiled brat.
- OMG Olivia: A Kree girl who is a direct descendant of the Kree that created the Inhumans and tries to mind control the populace.

== Reception ==
=== Accolades ===
- In 2020, Scary Mommy included Moon Girl in their "Looking For A Role Model? These 195+ Marvel Female Characters Are Truly Heroic" list.
- In 2021, Comic Book Resources (CBR) ranked Moon Girl 1st in their "Marvel: 10 Smartest Female Characters" list.
- In 2022, Collider ranked Moon Girl 2nd in their "10 Smartest Marvel Universe Geniuses" list.
- In 2022, Screen Rant included Moon Girl in their "15 Smartest Characters In Marvel Comics" list and their "10 Female Marvel Heroes That Should Come To The MCU" list.
- In 2022, CBR ranked Moon Girl 1st in their "10 Smartest Marvel Scientists" list, 2nd in their "10 Smartest Tech-Powered Heroes" list, and 10th in their "10 Inhumans Who Should Join The Avengers" list.

== In other media ==
=== Television ===
- Moon Girl appears in Moon Girl and Devil Dinosaur, voiced by Diamond White. This version is a normal 13-year-old human whose middle name is "Latifa", wears a superhero suit, and wields gadgets she built herself. Furthermore, she named herself "Moon Girl" after a scientist who built the machine that brought Devil Dinosaur to the present, later revealed to be her grandmother Miriam "Mimi" Lafayette (voiced by Alfre Woodard).
  - Additionally, an alternate reality variant of Moon Girl called Devil Girl appears in the episodes "Skip This Ad...olescence", "The Great Beyond-er!", and "To Intervention and Beyond-er", also voiced by White.
  - In the episode "Moon Girl's Day Off", Lunella has her best friend Casey Calderon (voiced by Libe Barer) take on the role of Moon Girl while she sneaks off to have a break.
- Moon Girl appears in Lego Marvel Avengers: Mission Demolition, voiced again by Diamond White.
- Moon Girl appears in the Spidey and His Amazing Friends episode "Moon Girl and the Dino Dilemma", voiced again by Diamond White.

=== Video games ===
- Moon Girl appears as an unlockable playable character in Marvel Future Fight.
- Moon Girl appears as an unlockable character in Marvel Avengers Academy, voiced by Cenophia Mitchell.
- Moon Girl appears as an unlockable playable character in Lego Marvel Super Heroes 2 via the "Champions Character Pack" DLC.
- Moon Girl and Devil Dinosaur appear as playable cards in Marvel Snap.
- Moon Girl and Devil Dinosaur appear as unlockable characters in Marvel Mystic Mayhem.
- Moon Girl appears as a non-playable character in Marvel Rivals, voiced again by Diamond White.

=== Miscellaneous ===
- Lunella Lafayette makes a cameo appearance in Web Slingers: A Spider-Man Adventure as a rookie engineer of the Worldwide Engineering Brigade (WEB) program.
- The television incarnation of Moon Girl appears as a meet-and-greet character at Avengers Campus.
- The television incarnation of Moon Girl, voiced again by Diamond White, appears in multiple Disney Channel web videos:
  - Moon Girl appears in the Chibi Tiny Tales shorts.
  - Moon Girl makes a non-speaking cameo appearance in the Broken Karaoke music video "Born to be Strange".
  - Moon Girl appears in the How NOT To Draw web short "How NOT To Draw Moon Girl".
  - Lunella appears in the Theme Song Takeover music video for Moon Girl and Devil Dinosaur.
  - Moon Girl appears in the Moon Girl's Lab short series.

== Collected editions ==
Title	Material collected	Writer	Artist	Publication date	ISBN
Moon Girl and Devil Dinosaur Vol. 1: BFF	Moon Girl and Devil Dinosaur (2015) #1–6	Amy Reeder, Brandon Montclare	Natacha Bustos	July 2016	978-1302900052
Moon Girl and Devil Dinosaur Vol. 2: Cosmic Cooties	Moon Girl and Devil Dinosaur (2015) #7–12	Amy Reeder, Brandon Montclare	Marco Failla, Natacha Bustos	January 2017	978-1302902087
Moon Girl and Devil Dinosaur Vol. 3: The Smartest There Is!	Moon Girl and Devil Dinosaur (2015) #13–18	Amy Reeder, Brandon Montclare	Leonard Kirk, Ray-Anthony Height, Natacha Bustos	July 2017	978-1302905347
Moon Girl and Devil Dinosaur Vol. 4: Girl-Moon	Moon Girl and Devil Dinosaur (2015) #19–24	Brandon Montclare	Natacha Bustos, Ray-Anthony Height, Dominike Stanton, Michael Shelfer	January 2018	978-1302905354
Moon Girl and Devil Dinosaur Vol. 5: Fantastic Three	Moon Girl and Devil Dinosaur (2015) #25–30	Brandon Montclare	Natacha Bustos, Alitha Martinez	July 2018	978-1302910990
Moon Girl and Devil Dinosaur Vol. 6: Save Our School	Moon Girl and Devil Dinosaur (2015) #32–36	Brandon Montclare	Natacha Bustos	December 2018	978-1302911003
Moon Girl and Devil Dinosaur Vol. 7: Bad Dream	Moon Girl and Devil Dinosaur (2015) #37–41	Brandon Montclare	Natacha Bustos, Gustavo Duarte	July 2019	978-1302914363
Moon Girl and Devil Dinosaur Vol. 8: Yancy Street Legends	Moon Girl and Devil Dinosaur (2015) #42–47	Brandon Montclare	Ray-Anthony Height, Gustavo Duarte, Alitha Martinez	December 2019	978-1302914370
Moon Girl and Devil Dinosaur: The Beginning	Moon Girl and Devil Dinosaur (2015) #1–12	Amy Reeder, Brandon Montclare	Natacha Bustos, Marco Failla	February 2019	978-1302916541
Moon Girl and Devil Dinosaur: Full Moon	Moon Girl and Devil Dinosaur (2015) #13–24	Amy Reeder, Brandon Montclare	Natacha Bustos, Ray-Anthony Height, Dominike Stanton, Michael Shelfer, Leonard Kirk	January 2020	978-1302921132
Moon Girl and Devil Dinosaur: Bad Buzz	Moon Girl and Devil Dinosaur (2015) #25–36	Brandon Montclare	Natacha Bustos, Ray-Anthony Height, Marco Failla, Alitha Martinez	June 2021	978-1302929848
Moon Girl and Devil Dinosaur: Place In The World	Moon Girl and Devil Dinosaur (2015) #37–47	Brandon Montclare	Natacha Bustos, Ray-Anthony Height, Gustavo Duarte, Alitha Martinez	September 2022	978-1302945008
Moon Girl and Devil Dinosaur: Menace on Wheels	Moon Girl and Devil Dinosaur (2023) #1–5	Jordan Ifueko	Alba Glez	July 2023	978-1302931254
