= Fallen Angels (comics) =

Comics

- Cover to Fallen Angels #1 (April 1987) by Kerry Gammill

Publication information
- Publisher: Marvel Comics
- Schedule: Monthly
- Format: Limited series
- No. of issues: 8

Creative team
- Created by: Jo Duffy and Kerry Gammill

Fallen Angels is a team of fictional superhuman teenagers appearing in American comic books published by Marvel Comics. The team featured Sunspot and Warlock of the New Mutants, Boom-Boom of X-Factor, and several other more obscure characters.

The team's only appearances were in the Fallen Angels eight-issue limited series, written by Jo Duffy, which ran from April 1987 to November 1987. The series was originally titled Misfits. Early ads and solicitations for the series showed this title shortly before it was released. A second mini-series was planned but never published. All eight issues were reprinted in 2011 in paperback and hardcover volumes.

== History ==
The group formed after Sunspot accidentally injured fellow New Mutant Cannonball, during a soccer game. Shunned by most of his teammates, a guilt-ridden Sunspot leaves the team. Warlock, unwilling to let Sunspot be alone in such a state, follows him. While living on the streets, the group befriende a young Korean girl named Chance, who can randomly enhance or inhibit the abilities of other mutants, and Ariel, a teleporter who can turn doors into temporary gateways. Ariel and Chance live with the longtime X-Men villain Vanisher, who had reinvented himself as a mentor to a group of pickpockets that included Chance and Ariel. They are soon joined by Multiple Man and Siryn, two X-Men allies who were sent to locate the wayward New Mutants, and Vanisher's former star thief Boom-Boom, who Ariel recruits after a fight with Iceman. The group soon picks up several additional non-mutant members: the cyborg Gomi, his two cybernetically enhanced lobsters Bill and Don, and Moon-Boy and Devil Dinosaur. However, Don is inadvertently killed by Devil Dinosaur.

Most of the eight issue mini-series focused upon Sunspot's guilt towards injuring Cannonball and the mystery of Ariel. It is eventually revealed that Ariel is an alien from the planet Coconut Grove, which had ceased to evolve and reached a genetic dead end. Ariel's superiors sought to remedy that situation by studying mutation in other species. Taking her friends to visit her planet, the team is captured by Ariel's superiors for vivisection. Ariel is revealed to be a mutant with persuasive abilities unlike any other members of her race. Gomi, whose abilities as a cyborg are unaffected by mutant inhibitor fields, escapes his cell and free the others, while Ariel uses her powers to convince the inhabitants of Coconut Grove to let them leave peacefully. Returning home, Sunspot and Warlock declare their intention to rejoin the New Mutants, while Siryn and Multiple Man decide to stay alongside their new friends.

== Connection to X-Men franchise ==
Fallen Angels takes place at the same time as the events of New Mutants #53-58. Sunspot and Warlock's departure from the group to join the Fallen Angels, happens in Fallen Angels #1, which takes place before the events of New Mutants #53. During a party at the Hellfire Club, Magneto notices how the New Mutants are too worried about their missing friends to enjoy themselves. Writer Louise Simonson, who took over writing New Mutants with #55, makes multiple mentions of their departure. Sunspot and Warlock's return to the team in New Mutants #59 is a major plot point, with them arriving in time to rescue their friends from Cameron Hodge and his anti-mutant group, the Right.

Boom Boom's departure from X-Factor is depicted in X-Factor #17 and in Fallen Angels #3, which respectively show the perspectives of Iceman and Boom Boom. Like with Sunspot and Warlock, Boom Boom's return to the team would serve a major plot point involving Cameron Hodge and the Right. Boom Boom returns in X-Factor #22, just as Hodge's group has attacked the team's headquarters and kidnapped the group's young charges. Following them, Boom Boom plays a critical role in rescuing her friends and unmasking Hodge as the leader of the Right.

Jamie Madrox's involvement with the Fallen Angels and his romance with Siryn was later retconned as not being the main version of the character, but a renegade clone of Madrox who drugged the real Madrox and took his place during the assignment. Madrox allies with Mister Sinister in an unsuccessful bid to destroy the real Madrox.

== Planned sequel ==
Marvel commissioned a sequel series in 1989, written by Jo Duffy and drawn by Colleen Doran. The sequel series would have jettisoned the various X-Men characters and focus instead on Chance, Ariel, Gomi, and Moon-Boy; as well as introduce several new characters. The planned sequel however, was never published though the first two issues had been completed by Duffy and Doran.

== Volume 2 ==
Fallen Angels

Publication information
- Publisher: Marvel Comics
- Schedule: Monthly
- No. of issues: 6

Creative team
- Created by: Bryan Edward Hill (writer); Szymon Kudranski (artist)

Fallen Angels was relaunched in November 2019 as part of Dawn of X. Written by Bryan Edward Hill, and drawn by Szymon Kudranski, the initial team comprised Cable, Psylocke, and X-23.

=== Cast ===
Issues	Cast
#1	Cable; Captain Britain; Magneto; Mister Sinister; Psylocke; X-23
#2	Cable; Dazzler; Mister Sinister; Psylocke; X-23
#3	Cable; Psylocke; X-23
#4	Cable; Psylocke; X-23
#5	Bling!; Cable; Husk; Magneto; Mister Sinister; Psylocke; X-23
#6	Bling!; Cable; Husk; Mister Sinister; Psylocke; X-23

== Fallen Angels Members ==
In 1987, the team debuted in Fallen Angels #1.

Original members
Character	Real name
Vanisher	Telford Porter
Ariel
Chance
Boom-Boom	Tabitha Smith

Recruits
Character	Real name	Joined in
Sunspot	Roberto Da Costa	Fallen Angels #2 (1987)
Gomi	Alphonsus Lefszycic	Fallen Angels #2 (1987)
Multiple Man	Jamie Madrox	Fallen Angels #2 (1987)
Warlock		Fallen Angels #2 (1987)
Siryn	Theresa Rourke Cassidy	Fallen Angels #3 (1987)
Moon-Boy		Fallen Angels #4 (1987)
Devil Dinosaur		Fallen Angels #4 (1987)

Fallen Angels (2019)
Character	Real name	Joined in
Psylocke	Kwannon	Fallen Angels, vol. 2 #1 (2019)
X-23	Laura Kinney	Fallen Angels, vol. 2 #1 (2019)
Cable	Nathan Christopher Charles Summers	Fallen Angels, vol. 2 #1 (2019)
Bling!	Roxanne Washington	Fallen Angels, vol. 2 #5 (2020)
Husk	Paige Guthrie	Fallen Angels, vol. 2 #5 (2020)

== Plot ==
According to the Marvel website, new series features Psylocke who finds herself in the Mutantkind world, "but when a face from her past returns only to be killed, she seeks help from others who feel similar to get vengeance."

=== Collected editions ===
Title	Material collected	Format	Publication date	ISBN
Fallen Angels by Bryan Hill Volume 1	Fallen Angels #1–6	Trade paperback	May 26, 2020	ISBN 978-1302919818
