= Devil Dinosaur =

Marvel Comics character

- Devil Dinosaur and Moon-Boy on the cover of Devil Dinosaur #1.

Publication information
- Publisher: Marvel Comics
- First appearance: Devil Dinosaur #1 (April 1978)
- Created by: Jack Kirby

In-story information
- Species: Devil-Beast
- Place of origin: Dinosaur World
- Team affiliations: Fallen Angels; Circus of Crime; Pet Avengers
- Partnerships: Moon-Boy; Moon Girl
- Abilities: Superhuman strength and durability; High intelligence

Devil Dinosaur is a character appearing in American comic books published by Marvel Comics. Created by Jack Kirby, the character first appeared in Devil Dinosaur #1 (April 1978). Devil Dinosaur is depicted as resembling an enormous, crimson Tyrannosaurus-like dinosaur. The character and his inseparable ape-like friend, Moon-Boy, are natives of "Dinosaur World," a version of Earth in a parallel universe where dinosaurs and other prehistoric creatures co-exist with tribes of primitive humanoid beings. Later, Devil Dinosaur is transported to the main universe and befriends Moon Girl in the new series Moon Girl And Devil Dinosaur.

Devil Dinosaur has appeared in various forms of media outside comics, primarily animated television series. Steve Blum and Fred Tatasciore voiced the character in Hulk and the Agents of S.M.A.S.H. and Moon Girl and Devil Dinosaur respectively.

== Publication history ==
Devil Dinosaur and Moon-Boy are the creations of artist Jack Kirby who scripted and penciled all nine issues of the first series. The comic is considered a "cult classic" by Kirby fans.

Kirby created the character during his third stint at Marvel (1975–1978). Having learned that DC Comics was working on an animated series featuring Kirby's Kamandi, Marvel attempted to one-up their competitor by instructing Kirby to create a series similar to Kamandi, but incorporating a dinosaur co-star, since dinosaurs were hugely popular with young audiences of the time. The resulting Devil Dinosaur series was short lived, lasting only nine months (April – December 1978), and the proposed animated series never entered development. The original Devil Dinosaur series chronicled Devil and Moon-Boy's adventures in their home, "Dinosaur World." After the cancellation of Devil Dinosaur, the character's appearances were relegated to one-shot comics, cameos, and supporting roles in other series.

In Devil Dinosaur #1, Kirby states in the "Dinosaur Dispatches" letters column that the original intent was for Moon-Boy and Devil to be an early human and dinosaur from Earth's past. Kirby writes: "After all, just where the Dinosaur met his end, and when Man first stood reasonably erect, is still shrouded in mystery". Writers subsequent to Kirby have approached the character's origin in various ways. Some have followed Kirby's lead and portrayed the character as being from the prehistoric past of the main Marvel continuity (sometimes referred to as "Earth-616"), while others have depicted Devil as hailing from either an alien planet or an alternate reality Earth. Marvel's most recent publications list Devil's home of origin as "Dinosaur World (Earth-78411)", a primitive version of Earth existing in one of the many alternative universes contained within the Marvel Multiverse.

The first appearance of Devil Dinosaur after the cancellation of the original series was in Marvel's Godzilla, King of the Monsters of 1979. The character was not to be referenced again in a Marvel comic until 1986 when the Thing of the Fantastic Four travels to a Pacific island where "Devil Dinosaur: The Movie" is being produced. During the Thing's visit, Godzilla appears. After battling and destroying a robot Devil Dinosaur used in the film, Godzilla disappears once again into the ocean. Devil Dinosaur himself does not actually appear in the 1986 story, but beginning with the Fallen Angels limited series of 1987, the character has continued to make sporadic appearances in Marvel publications.

In 2016, Devil Dinosaur was again given his own ongoing series Moon Girl And Devil Dinosaur. The series has Devil teaming up with Lunella Lafayette, a.k.a. Moon Girl, a 9-year-old prodigy from modern times. Moon Boy, no longer Devil's primary partner, plays only a minor role in the series.

== Fictional character biography ==
=== Early years on Dinosaur World ===
The young Devil Dinosaur was nearly burned to death by a tribe of Killer-Folk, hostile beings native to his planet, but was rescued by Moon-Boy, a young member of a rival tribe, the Small-Folk. Exposure to the Killer-Folk's fire activated a mutation in the dinosaur which gave him powers greater than others of his species and turned his skin red. Devil's early adventures on his home world include encounters with extraterrestrials and a brief teleportation to modern day Earth.

Later, Godzilla rampages through the Marvel Universe (Earth-616). In an attempt to stop the monster, S.H.I.E.L.D. shrinks Godzilla with Pym Particles and attempts to teleport him via a time machine to the prehistoric past. However, Godzilla's radiation apparently distorts the time machine so that he is transported to the alternative universe of Dinosaur World instead. While there, he briefly unites with Moon-Boy and Devil against a common foe before being pulled back to the main Marvel continuity.

=== Member of the Fallen Angels ===
After Ariel, an extraterrestrial mutant with teleportation powers, teleports the Fallen Angels to Dinosaur World, the group convinces Devil and Moon-Boy to join their team and return with them to Earth-616. During his time with the Fallen Angels, Devil Dinosaur accidentally kills "Don", the super-intelligent mutant lobster on the team by stepping on him. Devil and Moon-Boy return to their own universe when the Fallen Angels eventually disband.

=== Dinosaur World again ===
After their stint with the Fallen Angels, the duo's life back on Dinosaur World is interrupted numerous times by events occurring in the main Marvel continuity:

- During a conflict between Slapstick and his time manipulating foe, Doctor Yesterday, Devil and Moon-Boy are briefly teleported to Earth-616.
- In the midst of a tussle between the Technet and Lockheed inside Excalibur's lighthouse, Devil is once again briefly transported to Earth-616.
- Young Celestials transport the Hulk back in time to combat Devil.
- A renegade Skrull flees to Devil's planet and uses his shape shifting abilities to impersonate the late leader of the Killer-Folk, Seven Scars.
- Due to the manipulations of the interdimensional traveler Access, Devil Dinosaur's world briefly merges with the DC Comics universe, where he encounters the prehistoric hero Anthro.
- In the midst of a battle with a Kraken, Hulkpool and his unwitting companions accidentally time travel to Dinosaur World where Devil Dinosaur, Moon-Boy and the Small-Folk help destroy the kraken. During Hulkpool's effort to return to his own time, Devil and Moon-Boy are briefly teleported to the American Old West in the year 1873. While there, Devil attempts to eat a cowboy's horse.

=== Stranded on Earth 616 in modern times ===
==== New York City ====
Some time later, the sorceress Jennifer Kale, in an attempt to return Howard the Duck to his homeworld, inadvertently teleports Devil Dinosaur and Moon-Boy into her New York apartment. The disoriented dinosaur rampages through the city before being subdued by Ghost Rider. Stranded in modern-day Earth-616 after their teleportation there by Kale, the pair is hypnotized into joining the Circus of Crime. After being rescued by Spider-Man, Devil and Moon-Boy are relocated to the Savage Land.

==== The Savage Land ====
The Heroes for Hire mercenaries go on a mission to retrieve Moon-Boy from the Savage Land and encounter Devil Dinosaur, who is guarding a clutch of eggs and abandons Moon-Boy to ensure their safety. The mercenaries note the discrepancy between this development and his previously presumed male sex, and can only speculate as to the cause of the change. After returning to the U.S. the Heroes for Hire disband and group member Paladin leaves alone with Moon-Boy to collect the reward from the S.H.I.E.L.D. scientists who hired the mercenaries.

==== Devil and Moon-Boy Separated ====
Moon-Boy would remain under the custody of S.H.I.E.L.D. for some time, which drove Devil Dinosaur into a sort of saurian depression. Refusing to eat, or defend himself, he was in danger of dying. However, Stegron, the dinosaur man, became worried about the survival of the Devil-Beast due to it being the last known of its species. Leaving the Savage Land without the permission of Ka-Zar and building an army of reanimated dinosaurs, Stegron marched across the U.S. attacking S.H.I.E.L.D. base after base, until he was eventually stopped by the Fifty State Initiative. The group discovered the motive behind Stegron's plan and, though he was arrested all the same, Reptil smuggled Moon-Boy back to the Savage Land, where he was reunited with his companion.

==== Reunited in the Savage Land ====
Reunited in the Savage Land, the companions' adventures continued:

- When the Roxxon Energy Corporation attempts to extract vibranium from the Savage Land, the inhabitants of the Savage Land including Ka-Zar, Devil Dinosaur and Moon-Boy enter into battle to save their home. Roxxon's forces are soon subdued.
- Devil Dinosaur meets the Pet Avengers when they are accidentally transported to the Savage Land. Out of shock and anger, Devil attacks the group. Eventually, the group of animalian Avengers are able to return to their own world.
- An ancient entity attempts to conquer first the Savage Land, then the world. Moon Boy and Devil Dinosaur fight to defend innocent Savage Land citizens endangered by the entity. They are joined by many other heroes, some lost in time. The entity is killed by Zabu.
- The Savage Land Mutate, Brainchild, creates an army of cybernetic dinosaurs and steals Devil Dinosaur's eggs to experiment on them. Spider-Man arrives and helps Devil and Moon-Boy defeat the cybernetic dinosaurs and rescue the eggs. At the end of the adventure, one of the eggs hatches revealing a red baby Tyrannosaurus.

=== Adventures with Moon Girl ===
In the Savage Land, Devil Dinosaur and his enemies, the Killer Folk, are transported to New York by a temporal vortex, which also kills Moon-Boy. Moon-Boy's dying wish was for Devil Dinosaur to reclaim the sacred Nightstone from the Killer Folk and avenge him.

Lunella Lafeyette later obtains the Nightstone, identifies it as a Kree Omni-Wave Projector, and intends to use it to stop her latent Inhuman genes from activating. She comes into conflict with Amadeus Cho / Totally Awesome Hulk and the Killer Folk. Despite her efforts, Lunella is caught in a cloud of Terrigen Mist during a battle and enveloped in a cocoon as her body mutates.

Devil Dinosaur takes Lunella's cocoon to her lab and watches over it for several days until she emerges. Lunella is at first relieved she had not changed physically, but is dismayed to learn her Inhuman power causes her and Devil to swap bodies. While in Lunella's body, Devil Dinosaur makes her even more ostracized at school due to freaking out in class and attacking other students whilst Lunella rampages through the city.

Devil Dinosaur and Moon Girl's next opponent came in the form of Kid Kree - a misunderstood Kree boy who had failed to enter the academy twice, who sought to capture an Inhuman to impress his father and make a name for himself on Earth as Captain Marvel had - who disguised himself as a new student, Marvin Ellis, in Lunella's class. Moon Girl and Devil Dinosaur fought Kid Kree several times, once being separated by Ms. Marvel, who recognized their fight as the childish squabble it was, but still entrusted Moon Girl with a device to contact her if things ever got out of hand.

Lunella is then approached by Hulk, who gives her the Banner B.O.X. (Brain Omnicompetence Examiner), and is surprised when she solves it in seconds, proving her to be the smartest person on Earth. After consulting experts, Moon Girl, Hulk and Devil Dinosaur encounter Mole Man, who was attacking the city with a group of monsters. The next day, at her lab, Lunella ends up having a vision of herself in the future, where she is approached by Earth's smartest heroes. After school, she is approached by the Thing, who takes her for a walk when Hulk appears. When the two start fighting, Moon Girl and Devil Dinosaur manage to contain them while protecting the civilians, until both of them are left unconscious. Meanwhile, Doctor Doom is surprised to discover that Moon Girl is considered the smartest person on Earth and vows to prove himself superior. During science class, Lunella is attacked by robot drones until she is saved by Ironheart. They follow the drones to a nearby alley, where Moon Girl encounters Doctor Doom. After Doom escapes, Moon Girl and Ironheart go to Moon Girl's secret lab, where they discover that the energy signatures of the drones are mystic in origin. While tracing Doom's location, Moon Girl and Devil Dinosaur arrive at the Sanctum Sanctorum and are found by Doctor Strange.

Moon Girl and two of her classmates are attacked by Doctor Doom and his Doombots. Moon Girl uses an enlargement potion on herself to help Doctor Strange fight Doom and his robots. A few nights later, while installing an energy sensing probe, Moon Girl is found by five members of the X-Men. Arriving at an abandoned mall, Moon Girl reengineers a Cerebro helmet with the Omni-Wave Projector to locate Doom, only for her and the X-Men to travel back to the 1980s. Once there, Doctor Doom arrives with an army of Doombots. The X-Men and Devil fight the Doombots until Moon Girl takes off the helmet, sending them back to the present, where they discover that Doom is actually a Doombot. Lunella takes the Doombot to her lab to analyze it. Lunella later learns that her powers only activate during a full moon. She then encounters an army of Doombots, along with Thing, Hulk, Ms. Marvel, Ironheart, Doctor Strange, Kid Kree and the Killer Folk, who went to her aid after being recruited by Lunella.

Moon Girl attempts to return Devil Dinosaur to the Savage Land, but retrieves him after admitting that her actions were wrong. Afterwards while Wilson Fisk's daughter Princess is enrolled in her school, Moon Girl briefly transforms Devil into a human boy and enrolls him in her class to tone down his destructive accidents. Taking attention away from Princess causes her to begin focusing her and her father's negative attentions on the two.

During the Secret Empire storyline, Devil Dinosaur and Moon Girl join up with Daisy Johnson's Secret Warriors. After rescuing Karnak from a prison camp, the Warriors encounter the Howling Commandos after falling into a trap. While driving West, the team is found by the X-Men. After escaping New Tian, the team meets Dark Beast, an evil version of Beast, who's tortured by Daisy and Karnak on information of an Inhuman who can help them. After receiving their information, the team encounters Mister Hyde along with Hydra's Avengers. After a brief fight, the team is captured until they break out when Daisy uses her powers to destroy the Helicarrier they were in. While trying to break Devil out of his cage, Moon Girl meets Leer, the Inhuman Karnak mentioned, who knocks her unconscious when the Helicarrier crash lands. Fortunately, Moon Girl and Devil have switched brains just in time, enabling Moon Girl to lead the Warriors to an Inhuman prison camp. There, the Warriors plan a jailbreak with the imprisoned Inhumans when the Underground resistance arrives to help them. It is later revealed that Leer is Karnak's son and that Karnak had sold him to Mister Sinister to help activate his powers.

== Powers and abilities ==
Devil Dinosaur is a gigantic theropod, and thus possesses super strength and durability. He also possesses above normal intelligence, on par with a human's.

== Reception ==
=== Accolades ===
- In 2019, Comic Book Resources (CBR) ranked Devil Dinosaur 14th in their "15 Coolest Pets In Comic Books" list.
- In 2020, CBR ranked Devil Dinosaur 2nd in their "10 Most Iconic Pets In Marvel Comics" list.
- In 2022, Screen Rant included Devil Dinosaur in their "10 Most Powerful Dragons & Dinosaurs In Marvel Comics" list.
- In 2022, CBR ranked Devil Dinosaur 3rd in their "10 Scariest Pets In Marvel Comics" list.

== Other versions ==
=== Astonishing Spider-Man and Wolverine ===
A cybernetic, alternate universe version of Devil Dinosaur appears in Astonishing Spider-Man and Wolverine #1.

=== Deadpool Kills Deadpool ===
Deadpool Dinosaur, an alternate universe version of Devil Dinosaur amalgamated with Deadpool, appears in Deadpool Kills Deadpool #3.

=== Earth-X ===
Devil Dinosaur's skeletal remains appear in Earth X #0.

=== Infinity Wars ===
An alternate universe version of Devil Dinosaur, amalgamated with Tippy-Toe and Monkey Joe, appears in Infinity Wars. This version is a red squirrel who grew to a massive size after being exposed to Terrigen Mists.

=== Mutant X ===
An alternate universe version of Devil Dinosaur from Earth-1298 appears in Mutant X as a member of the Lethal Legion.

=== Nextwave ===
An alternate universe clone of Devil Dinosaur from Earth-63163 appears in Nextwave. This version is capable of speech and claims to be the head of the Beyond Corporation. (Note: In a 2005 interview, writer Warren Ellis commenting on his Nextwave stories stated: "I think it has to be a self contained universe. It takes from Marvel history, but I wouldn't necessarily want to drag mainstream Marvel into it for fear of what I would do to it". [Jennifer M. Contino (2005-12-08). "Ellis Talks Nextwave & Ultimate Extinction", http://www.comicon.com/cgi-bin/ultimatebb.cgi?ubb=get_topic;f=36;t=004516 Archived 2007-10-13 at the Wayback Machine] In 2006, Marvel Editor-in-Chief Joe Quesada stated that "for the time being" Nextwave is set in a universe separate from the main Marvel continuity [Wade Gum (2006-07-01). "Heros Con: Joe Quesada Panel", "Wizard Entertainment". Archived from the original on 2007-07-11.] In contradiction to these earlier statements, recent Marvel publications such as Official Handbook of the Marvel Universe and Civil War: Battle Damage Report (February 2007) seem to portray Nextwave's activities as occurring in the mainstream Marvel continuity. Nextwave's entry in Civil War: Battle Damage Report states: "Recent intelligence suggests some or all Nextwave members unknowingly had their memories and/or personalities altered by their new employers (H.A.T.E.)". The Nextwave entry in Civil War: Battle Damage Report may be evidence of an editorial decision to include the Nextwave team in the main Marvel continuity in a way that provides a plot device to explain away inconsistencies caused by the previous editorial position that Nextwave was set in an alternate universe.)

=== Planet Hulk ===
An alternate universe version of Devil Dinosaur from Earth-15513 appears in Secret Wars.

=== What If? ===
An alternate universe version of Devil Dinosaur from Earth-34882 appears in What If? #34.

== In other media ==
=== Television ===
- Devil Dinosaur appears in The Super Hero Squad Show episode "The Devil Dinosaur You Say! (Six Against Infinity, Part 4)", with vocal effects provided by Dee Bradley Baker.
- Devil Dinosaur appears in Hulk and the Agents of S.M.A.S.H., with vocal effects provided by Steve Blum. This version initially lives in the Savage Land until he is brainwashed by Sauron and forced to serve him before the Agents of S.M.A.S.H. free Devil and adopt him.
  - Additionally, two alternate universe versions of Devil Dinosaur, El Diablo and an unnamed vampiric version, appear in the "Days of Future Smash" arc, with the former voiced by Blum while the latter has no dialogue.
- Devil Dinosaur makes minor appearances in Avengers Assemble.
- Devil Dinosaur makes a cameo appearance in the Guardians of the Galaxy episode "One in a Million You" as one of several creatures in the Collector's zoo.
- Devil Dinosaur appears in Moon Girl and Devil Dinosaur, with vocal effects provided by Fred Tatasciore. This version was summoned to New York City after Lunella built a portal in an attempt to solve her town's energy problems, believing it to be a generator, and chose to stay despite her attempts to send him back.
  - Additionally, an alternate reality version of Devil Dinosaur called Moon Dinosaur appears in the episode "The Great Beyond-er!", also voiced by Tatasciore.
- Devil Dinosaur appears in Lego Marvel Avengers: Mission Demolition, voiced again by Fred Tatasciore.
- Devil Dinosaur appears in the Spidey and His Amazing Friends episode "Moon Girl and the Dino Dilemma", voiced again by Fred Tatasciore.

=== Video games ===
- Devil Dinosaur appears as an unlockable playable character in Marvel Puzzle Quest.
- Devil Dinosaur appears as an unlockable playable character in Lego Marvel's Avengers.
- Devil Dinosaur appears as an unlockable playable character in Marvel Avengers Academy.
- Devil Dinosaur appears as an unlockable playable character in Lego Marvel Super Heroes 2 as part of the "Champions Character Pack" DLC.
- Devil Dinosaur appears in Marvel Snap.
- Devil Dinosaur appears as a playable character in Marvel Rivals, voiced again by Fred Tatasciore.

=== Miscellaneous ===
- Devil Dinosaur appears in The Avengers: United They Stand #7.
- Devil Dinosaur makes a cameo appearance in Web Slingers: A Spider-Man Adventure.
- The Moon Girl and Devil Dinosaur incarnation of Devil Dinosaur appears in the 2024 graphic novel Wreck and Roll!.

== Collected editions ==
=== With Moon Boy ===
Title	Material collected	Publication date	ISBN
Devil Dinosaur Omnibus	Devil Dinosaur #1–9	July 11, 2007	0-7851-2694-5
Devil Dinosaur by Jack Kirby: The Complete Collection	Devil Dinosaur #1–9	June 14, 2014	978-0785126942
Marvel Monsters	Marvel Monsters: Devil Dinosaur and Marvel Monsters: Fin Fang Four, Monsters on the Prowl, Where Monsters Dwell and Marvel Monster Handbook	February 2006	978-0785121411

=== With Moon Girl ===
Title	Material collected	Publication date	ISBN
Moon Girl And Devil Dinosaur Vol. 1: BFF	Moon Girl And Devil Dinosaur #1-6	July 2016	978-1302900052
Moon Girl And Devil Dinosaur Vol. 2: Cosmic Cooties	Moon Girl And Devil Dinosaur #7-12	January 2017	978-1302902087
Moon Girl And Devil Dinosaur Vol. 3: The Smartest There Is	Moon Girl And Devil Dinosaur #13-18	June 2017	978-1302905347
Moon Girl And Devil Dinosaur Vol. 4: Girl-Moon	Moon Girl And Devil Dinosaur #19-24	September 2017	978-1302905354
Moon Girl And Devil Dinosaur Vol. 5: Fantastic Three	Moon Girl And Devil Dinosaur #25-30	July 2018	978-1302910990
Moon Girl And Devil Dinosaur Vol. 6: Save Our School	Moon Girl And Devil Dinosaur #31-36	January 2019	978-1302911003
Moon Girl And Devil Dinosaur Vol. 7: Bad Dream	Moon Girl And Devil Dinosaur #37-41	July 2019	978-1302914363
Moon Girl And Devil Dinosaur Vol. 8: Yancy Street Legends	Moon Girl And Devil Dinosaur #42-47	January 2020	978-1302914370
Moon Girl And Devil Dinosaur: The Beginning	Moon Girl And Devil Dinosaur #1-12	February 2019	978-1302916541
Moon Girl And Devil Dinosaur: Full Moon	Moon Girl And Devil Dinosaur #13-24	January 2020	978-1302921132
Moon Girl And Devil Dinosaur: Bad Buzz	Moon Girl And Devil Dinosaur #25-36	June 2021	978-1302929848
Moon Girl And Devil Dinosaur: Place In The World	Moon Girl And Devil Dinosaur #36-47	September 2022	978-1302945008
Moon Girl and the Marvel Universe	Moon Girl And Devil Dinosaur #24,31 and material from Extraordinary X-Men Annual #1, Venom #153, Monsters Unleashed #12, Moon Girl Marvel Legacy Primer pages	December 2018	978-1302913700
