= Moon-Boy =

Marvel Comics fictional character

- Moon-Boy with Devil Dinosaur.

Publication information
- Publisher: Marvel Comics
- First appearance: Devil Dinosaur #1 (April 1978)
- Created by: Jack Kirby (writer / artist)

In-story information
- Species: Ape-like humanoid
- Team affiliations: Fallen Angels; Circus of Crime
- Partnerships: Devil Dinosaur
- Abilities: Expertise in survival

Moon-Boy is a character appearing in American comic books published by Marvel Comics. He is best known as the constant companion of Devil Dinosaur.

== Publication history ==
Moon-Boy made his debut in Devil Dinosaur #1 (April 1978) and was a continuing character in all nine issues of the series' run. Since the cancellation of the original Devil Dinosaur series, Moon-Boy's appearances have coincided with Devil Dinosaur's various cameo appearances, supporting roles, and one-shot comics.

The team of Devil Dinosaur and Moon-Boy was created by artist Jack Kirby who scripted and penciled all issues of the first Devil Dinosaur series. Kirby's intent was for the duo to be inhabitants of Earth's prehistoric past as evidenced by a title on the cover of Devil Dinosaur #1 which proclaims Moon-Boy to be the "first human". Some later writers retconned the pair to be mutants from an alien world, while others have written them as being from Dinosaur World, a planet in the parallel universe of Earth-78411.

== Fictional character biography ==
Moon-Boy was born into a tribe of ape-like humanoids known as the Small-Folk in the Valley of Flame, a region of numerous active volcanoes. Moon-Boy's connection with Devil Dinosaur began as a young boy when he came across a female dinosaur being attacked by a rival tribe known as the Killer-Folk. The female was killed, as well as two of her three young. The third survived, but was badly burnt, turning his skin red. Moon-Boy cared for the orphaned creature after its ordeal and named him Devil.

Ostracized from his tribe because of his association with Devil, Moon-Boy and Devil become wanderers. Devil and Moon-Boy's wanderings take them to distant times and worlds. After several trips to the modern era of Earth-616 via magic, time travel, and teleportation by mutants, the two settle in the Savage Land of Earth-616.

After the Roxxon Energy Corporation invades the Savage Land, Ka-Zar recruits Moon-Boy and Devil Dinosaur to fight them. Later, the Heroes for Hire take Moon-Boy to New York City, place him into S.H.I.E.L.D. custody, and separate him from Devil. This leads Stegron to attack S.H.I.E.L.D. bases in an attempt to rescue him. After learning of Stegron's motivations, the heroes return Moon-Boy and Devil Dinosaur to the Savage Land.

Moon-Boy and Devil Dinosaur frighten off a pair of Killer Folk to reclaim the Nightstone, which the Killer Folk worshiped and had killed many Small Folk over. Devil Dinosaur chases away the Killer Folk while Moon-Boy claims the Nightstone, intending to hide it far away from the Killer Folk's reach. A band of Killer Folk emerge from the trees and attack Moon-Boy, beating him relentlessly to reclaim the Nightstone. The Nightstone disappears due to a vortex opened by Lunella Lafayette, which the Killer Folk leave through in search of the Nightstone. After Moon-Boy dies from his injuries, Devil Dinosaur travels into the vortex to avenge him.

Some time later, Devil and Moon Girl make use of a time machine to save Moon-Boy moments before his death.

== Powers and abilities ==
Moon-Boy has lifelong experience at foraging and general survival in the wild. He possesses a thick coat of hair that protects him from the elements.

== Other versions ==
- Moon-Boy's skeletal remains appear in Earth X #0.
- An alternate universe version of Moon-Boy from Earth-1298, with elements of Moon Knight, appears in Mutant X as a member of the Lethal Legion.

== In other media ==
=== Television ===
- Moon-Boy appears in The Super Hero Squad Show episode "The Devil Dinosaur You Say! (Six Against Infinity, Part 4)", voiced by Josh Keaton. This version is from an alternate universe called "Dinosaur World".
- Moon-Boy appears in the Hulk and the Agents of S.M.A.S.H. episode "Days of Future Smash: The Dino Era", voiced by James Arnold Taylor. This version is from an alternate timeline created by the Leader where dinosaurs evolved to become intelligent and civilized.

=== Video games ===
Moon-Boy appears as a playable character in Lego Marvel's Avengers, voiced again by James Arnold Taylor.
