= Lockjaw and the Pet Avengers =

Comic book series

- The Pet Avengers on the cover of Lockjaw and the Pet Avengers #1 (July 2009). Art by Karl Kerschl.

Publication information
- Publisher: Marvel Comics
- Schedule: Monthly
- Format: Limited series
- Genre: Superhero
- Publication date: July – Oct. 2009
- No. of issues: 4
- Main character(s): Lockjaw; Throg; Lockheed; Redwing; Devil Dinosaur; Zabu; Ms. Lion; Hairball

Creative team
- Written by: Chris Eliopoulos
- Artist(s): Ig Guara; Colleen Coover
- Letterer: Nate Piekos
- Colorist: Chris Sotomayor
- Editor(s): Nathan Cosby; Ralph Macchio

Collected editions
- Lockjaw and the Pet Avengers: ISBN 0-7851-4123-5
- Pet Avengers Classic: ISBN 0-7851-3966-4

Lockjaw and the Pet Avengers is a four-issue comic book limited series published by Marvel Comics from July to October 2009. It was followed up by the four-issue limited series Lockjaw and the Pet Avengers Unleashed from May to August 2010. Both series were written by Chris Eliopoulos with art by Ig Guara.

== Plot ==
Fantastic Four member Mister Fantastic visits Attilan, city of the Inhumans, seeking the six Infinity Gems (each an artifact of great power). Lockjaw, an oversized dog and pet of the Inhuman Royal Family, finds the Mind Gem, which increases the animal's intelligence. Using telepathy to read Mr. Fantastic's mind, Lockjaw decides to find the remaining Gems. The pet encounters and recruits a number of other animal companions to heroes, including the cat Hairball, the dragon-like alien Lockheed, the falcon Redwing, the frog Throg, the duck Howard the Duck, the rabbit Super Rabbit, the ferret Nosie, the monkey Hit-Monkey, the squirrels Monkey Joe and Tippy-Toe, Jeff the Land Shark, and the puppy Ms. Lion (originally a character from the animated series Spider-Man and His Amazing Friends).

Courtesy of Lockjaw's ability to teleport, the group visit the prehistoric Savage Land and acquire the Time Gem and the aid of the sabretooth tiger Zabu, and the Tyrannosaurus rex Devil Dinosaur. The Space Gem is found in the past, and after an underwater encounter and being swallowed by the whale-like Giganto, the group collect the Soul Gem and the Reality Gem. The animal team converge on the final Gem, the Power Gem, which is in the possession of the President of the United States' dog, Bo. The Titan Thanos, a previous owner of all six Gems when united as the Infinity Gauntlet, intervenes and kills Ms. Lion. The other animals are angered by this act and use the Gems to strand Thanos in an alternate dimension and subsequently revive their comrade.

Retrieving the final Gem, the group decides to separate, but not before Throg advises that they now share a psychic link and will reunite if needed. Ms. Lion (resurrected by Hairball via the Soul Gem) dubs the group the Pet Avengers. The series concludes with Lockjaw presenting the Gems to a surprised Mr. Fantastic.

== Reception ==
The first series received mixed reviews, with IGN rating the first issue a 6.5 out of 10. The first issue sold out and went to second printing.

The story of the team continued in a second series, Lockjaw and the Pet Avengers: Unleashed (May – August 2010), followed by a third limited series Avengers vs. the Pet Avengers (December 2010 – March 2011) and a guest appearance in the Power Pack all-ages miniseries title Thor and the Warriors Four (April 2010). They also appeared with Rocket Raccoon and Cosmo of the Guardians of the Galaxy in Guardians Team-Up #5 (June 2015).

== Collected editions ==
The stories have been collected into two trade paperback volumes:

- Lockjaw and the Pet Avengers (collects Lockjaw and the Pet Avengers #1-4, the Tails of the Pet Avengers digital comic, and the Marvel Pets Handbook), 176 pages, May 2010, ISBN 0-7851-4123-5 (hardcover, November 2009, ISBN 0-7851-4271-1)
- Lockjaw and the Pet Avengers Unleashed (collects Lockjaw and the Pet Avengers Unleashed #1-4, the Tails of the Pet Avengers: The Dog Days of Summer one-shot issue, and a Hulk-Pet Avengers single-page story), 120 pages, February 2011, ISBN 0-7851-4303-3 (hardcover, September 2010, ISBN 0-7851-4304-1)
- Avengers vs. Pet Avengers (collects Avengers vs. Pet Avengers #1-4 and Spider-Man Family #6), 128 pages, July 2011, ISBN 0-7851-5185-0

Previous appearances by the animals have also been collected into trade paperback:

- Pet Avengers Classic (collects Thing #4, Captain America #220, Ka-Zar the Savage #14-15, X-Men Unlimited #43, Marvel Comics Presents #72, Speedball #6, Marvel Tales #100, Marvel Super-Heroes #8, Amazing Fantasy #15, Fantastic Four #94, New Defenders #150, New Mutants Annual #4, Franklin Richards: Happy Franksgiving, New Warriors #2, and Journey into Mystery #57), 208 pages, October 2009, ISBN 0-7851-3966-4

== In other media ==
=== Video game ===
- The Pet Avengers are playable in Marvel Avengers Academy. This team also includes Throg, Redwing, Firebird, Zabu, and Howard the Duck.

== See also ==
- Legion of Super-Pets
