= Shanna the She-Devil =

Marvel Comics character

- Promotional art for Shanna the She-Devil vol. 2 #1 (April 2005). Art by Frank Cho.

Publication information
- Publisher: Marvel Comics
- First appearance: Shanna the She-Devil #1 (December 1972)
- Created by: Carole Seuling (writer); George Tuska (artist)

In-story information
- Full name: Shanna O'Hara, Lady Plunder
- Species: Human mutate
- Place of origin: Earth
- Partnerships: Ka-Zar; Zabu
- Notable aliases: Lady Plunder; Jungle Princess; Queen of the Savage Land
- Abilities: Experienced hand to hand combatant; Well-trained veterinarian; Superhuman strength; Olympic-level athlete; Extraordinary agility; Peak-level strength

Shanna the She-Devil is an adventure superheroine appearing in American comic books published by Marvel Comics. Created by writer Carole Seuling and artist George Tuska, the character first appeared in Shanna the She-Devil #1 (cover dated December 1972). She was one of three ongoing titles, alongside Night Nurse and The Claws of the Cat, that Marvel launched using concepts and names developed by Stan Lee and commissioned by editor Roy Thomas in an effort to draw back female readers. Shanna the She-Devil is the persona of Shanna O'Hara, a veterinarian, ecologist, and former Olympic-caliber gymnast who works at a Manhattan zoo. After a sniper kills the animals in her care, Shanna abandons city life and remains in Africa as a jungle-dwelling protector of its wildlife.

The character was later paired with the jungle lord Ka-Zar, whom she eventually married, and the two raised a family together in the Savage Land. In 2005, writer-artist Frank Cho introduced a separate character using the same name and visual concept for a Marvel Knights miniseries; this version, a genetically engineered blonde discovered on Monster Island, is not confirmed to share continuity with the original Shanna O'Hara.

Since her creation, commentary on Shanna has centered on the sexualized visual presentation of the character. Stan Lee said the character, along with Night Nurse and The Claws of the Cat, was created in part to appeal to male readers, and editor Roy Thomas said this shaped early creative decisions on the book. Reviewers of the character's 2013 appearances in Savage Wolverine similarly linked her depiction to the visual conventions of the earlier jungle queen comics genre.

== Publication history ==
=== Design and creation ===
Stan Lee by late 1972 was trying to "feature as many females as possible" among Marvel Comics' headlining characters, a goal that led to three new titles: Shanna the She-Devil, Night Nurse, and The Claws of the Cat. Asked years later whether the books were meant to win back a declining female readership, Lee agreed, adding that Marvel also wanted "to appeal to the male readers who liked looking at pretty girls." In a separate interview, editor Roy Thomas said Lee originated the concept and names for all three series and that his own contribution was seeking out women to write them.

Thomas asked Carole Seuling, who had written for fanzines connected to her ex-husband Phil Seuling's comic conventions, to script Shanna the She-Devil, saying he approached her because she liked jungle and adventure comics and was a fan of Wonder Woman. Seuling recalled that her brief was to write a heroine "who would fit in with the times and also was a little more prone to violence than Sheena or the other jungle queens of the past." She wrote the character's origin and scripted the series through issue #3 (April 1973), leaving after taking a full-time teaching job that prevented her from attending Marvel's script conferences. Steve Gerber, whose first Marvel assignment had been writing additional dialogue for Seuling's script on issue #1, took over as writer for the rest of the series. In a later interview, Seuling said she wanted to correct the record on Gerber's role, stating that many sources incorrectly credit him as a co-creator or originator of the character, and that Gerber himself denied any part in Shanna's origin before his death.

George Tuska drew the interior art of the debut issue. Ross Andru became the regular interior artist beginning with issue #2, inked by Vince Colletta; Thomas said in retrospect that he had specifically paired the two artists to make Andru's rendition of the character more visually appealing.

=== 1970s ===
Shanna the She-Devil #1 establishes Shanna O'Hara as a veterinarian, ecologist, and environmental specialist at the Central Park Zoo who had turned down a place on the United States Olympic gymnastics team to study big cats. After a sniper kills the zoo's African-plains animals, including her hand-reared leopard Julani, who is then fatally shot by a panicked zoo guard in front of her, Shanna travels to Africa to release Julani's surviving cubs, Ina and Biri, into the wild. The experience, combined with a childhood memory of her father accidentally shooting her mother while firing wildly at a leopard, leads Shanna to remain in Africa as the jungle-dwelling "She-Devil," working alongside game warden Patrick McShane and S.H.I.E.L.D. agent Jakuna Singh. Seuling said the story's environmental framing came from her own experience living near the New York Aquarium, where she said animals had died after being fed litter by visitors, and that a real zoo shooting had occurred the year before the comic's debut.

Issue #2 (February 1973) depicts Shanna aiding Jakuna Singh against the slave trader El Montano and includes a scene in which Shanna orders her leopards to kill a captor. Seuling said the scene drew reader complaints, including one letter, published by Marvel, accusing Shanna and Seuling of condoning murder. Issue #4 (June 1973) introduces the recurring villain the Mandrill, and issue #5 (August 1973), the series' final issue, introduces his ally Nekra, whom Shanna captures after leaving McShane on guard.

Shanna continued to appear as a guest character after her own title ended. She appeared in the final panel of the January 1974 issue of Ka-Zar: Lord of the Hidden Jungle and returned in the following issue, meeting Ka-Zar for the first time as the two battle the Red Wizard. Editor Roy Thomas said he could not recall whether introducing the pair had been his idea or that of Ka-Zar writer Mike Friedrich, and Friedrich said in a later interview that he had no memory of the stories in question. Shanna's search for her missing father, and the revelation that Nekra had escaped custody and killed McShane, carried into Steve Gerber's run on Daredevil (May–August 1974), where Shanna joins Daredevil and Black Widow against the Mandrill's organization, Black Spectre.

Shanna subsequently appeared in two issues of the black-and-white magazine Savage Tales (January and March 1975). The first, scripted by Gerry Conway with art by John Buscema and Tony DeZuniga, depicts a growing attraction between Shanna and Ka-Zar; Conway later said he introduced Shanna into the magazine to give it "a strong female lead" and to provide Ka-Zar with "a potential love interest ... who'd rival him in effectiveness as a hero." The second, written by Carla Conway and edited by Gerry Conway, kills off Jakuna Singh and the leopards Ina and Biri at the hands of a new villain, Raga Shah. Conway said the deaths were meant to raise Shanna's personal stakes and clear the way for a relationship with Ka-Zar; the story drew further reader criticism, including from future comics professionals Ralph Macchio and Peter B. Gillis, who wrote in as fans. Savage Tales was cancelled two issues later, and Conway left Marvel for DC Comics.

=== 1980s and 1990s ===
A 1978 backup story by Steve Gerber in Rampaging Hulk #9 places Shanna in San Pedro, California, two years after Savage Tales's cancellation, seeking psychiatric help for an obsessive pursuit of Raga Shah before finally confronting him. The story went unfinished for over a decade. Marvel Fanfare editor Al Milgrom said he found pencilled pages by Carmine Infantino and complete scripts for further chapters in Marvel's files and asked Gerber to complete the storyline for Marvel Fanfare #56–59 (April–October 1991); Gerber agreed, finishing a plot he had begun thirteen years earlier. Milgrom said artist Bret Blevins inked and later pencilled several chapters, and that Tony DeZuniga completed the final chapter after Blevins could not meet its deadline.

Shanna was added to the ongoing series Ka-Zar the Savage beginning in April 1981, this time in an established relationship with the title character. Several editors and writers involved with the book, including Louise Simonson, Jim Shooter, and Danny Fingeroth, said in later interviews that they could not recall who had decided to pair the characters. Writer Bruce Jones, who scripted the series, said he believed the pairing worked because Shanna "made a good foil for Ka-Zar." Shanna and Ka-Zar married in Ka-Zar the Savage #29 (December 1983), and Shanna's pregnancy was revealed in issue #34 (October 1984), the series' final issue; editor Danny Fingeroth said the marriage and pregnancy fit the series' broader theme of a young man's maturation.

Shanna later appeared in an eight-page solo story in Marvel Comics Presents #13 (February 1989), written and drawn by Bruce Jones as a favor to the title's editor. A graphic novel, Ka-Zar of the Savage Land, depicted Shanna and Ka-Zar as separated while raising their young son, Kyle, before Shanna returns to civilization and Ka-Zar remains in a newly discovered underground world; writer Chuck Dixon said the story was meant to begin a broader relaunch of Ka-Zar that was abandoned after editor Archie Goodwin left Marvel for DC Comics. Shanna also starred in the ten-part Marvel Comics Presents serial "The Bush of Ghosts" (January–June 1991), written by Gerard Jones and drawn by Paul Gulacy; Jones said the story was inspired by the film The Naked Prey and that one especially graphic sequence was redrawn at editor Tom DeFalco's request. Marvel's subsequent comics, including Namor (October 1991), depicted Shanna and Ka-Zar as still together and raising their child, treating "The Bush of Ghosts" and the graphic novel as outside the main continuity; Jones said his own favorite depiction of the character remained Bruce Jones's earlier Ka-Zar the Savage, in which Shanna was written as Ka-Zar's partner rather than his sidekick.

In writer Mark Waid's 1997 Ka-Zar series, which ran twenty issues, the couple's son is named Matthew; a later issue reveals that Ka-Zar had been unaware the boy was named after Shanna's friend Matt Murdock.

=== 2000s, 2010s, and 2020s ===
In April 2005, writer-artist Frank Cho launched a seven-issue Shanna the She-Devil miniseries under Marvel's Marvel Knights imprint, followed by a four-issue sequel in 2007. Cho's version of the character is a genetically engineered blonde discovered on Monster Island, and neither series confirms a connection to the Shanna O'Hara of the original Marvel Universe continuity.

Shanna and Ka-Zar guest-starred in Jonathan Maberry's Klaws of the Panther (2010), in which Shanna greets Black Panther successor Shuri during a visit to the Savage Land before the pair discover Ka-Zar under mind control. Maberry said the characters' appearances were tied to the Savage Land's new role as a source of vibranium rather than being "simply stunt casting."

Frank Cho wrote and drew Shanna as a co-lead alongside Wolverine in the ongoing series Savage Wolverine, which launched in January 2013 as part of Marvel's Marvel NOW! relaunch. Cho said he modeled the pair's dynamic on the film Raiders of the Lost Ark, describing Shanna as "Marion Ravenwood to Wolverine's Indiana Jones," and said he wanted a character who could "keep up with Wolverine and match his savagery." In the series, Shanna gains a mystical "bonding" to the Savage Land following a guest appearance by Man-Thing in the fourth issue. A separate 2012 miniseries, Shanna the She-Devil: Survival of the Fittest, was written by Jimmy Palmiotti and Justin Gray and drawn by Khari Evans.

Zac Thompson and artist Germán García's 2021 limited series Ka-Zar: Lord of the Savage Land depicted Shanna and a resurrected Ka-Zar bound through "a mystical merging of life energies" that grants Ka-Zar new powers. Thompson said he wrote the family's dynamic so that "Ka-Zar is bold and brash, Shanna is measured and empathetic," in contrast with their son Matthew, and said the series drew on Bruce Jones and Brent Anderson's earlier Ka-Zar the Savage for its adventure tone.

Shanna subsequently appeared in Marvel Zombies: Black, White & Blood #4 (January 2024), fighting reanimated dinosaurs in the Savage Land in a story written by Steve Skroce, Mary SanGiovanni, and Stephanie Phillips; in the anthology Women of Marvel: She-Devils #1 (February 2025), written by Stephanie Phillips and Alison Sampson; and in Rogue: The Savage Land #4 (April 2025), written by Tim Seeley, in which she helps Rogue fight the villain Zaladane.

== Characterization ==
=== Fictional character biography ===
Shanna the She-Devil #2 (Feb. 1973), cover art by Jim Steranko.

Shanna O'Hara is the only daughter of a wealthy diamond miner. She spent her early childhood growing up in the jungles of Zaire. At the age of six, she witnessed her father accidentally shoot and kill her mother, which caused Shanna to develop a lifelong hatred of firearms. Following the tragedy, a traumatized Shanna was sent to live with relatives in the United States. In America, she grew into an athletic adult, competing in the Summer Olympics in both swimming and track and field. She also turned down an opportunity to join the US Olympic Gymnastics Team. She instead studied to become a veterinarian and an ecologist.

After graduation, Shanna worked as an environmental specialist for the Central Park Zoo. Her life changed when a sniper broke into the facility and killed most of the big cats in her care. Shanna leaped into the enclosure and found Julani, a leopard she had raised from a cub, severely wounded. When a zoo guard attempted to intervene, he accidentally shot and killed Julani. Following the incident, Shanna quit her job. The zoo director allowed her to take Julani's surviving cubs, Ina and Biri, and return them to the wild. She relocated to the Dahomey Reserve in Africa, wearing Julani's pelt to help the cubs recognize her scent. Realizing her affinity for the jungle, she took on the name "Shanna the She-Devil" and began protecting the reserve from poachers.

In Africa, Shanna worked alongside game warden Patrick McShane and S.H.I.E.L.D. agent Jakuna Singh. She thwarted a slave trader named El Montano and deposed the insane high priest of a hidden Greek civilization descended from Cretan refugees. Her father was later kidnapped by the Mandrill, a villain attempting to overthrow several African nations. During her search for her father, the wizard Malgato kidnapped Shanna and transported her to the Savage Land. She was assisted by Ka-Zar, whom she knocked unconscious before developing a plan to defeat a foe known as the Red Wizard. She declined Ka-Zar's offer to stay in the Savage Land in order to resume her search.

Shanna discovered that the Mandrill and his organization, Black Spectre, was responsible for her father's death. She traveled to the United States and partnered with Daredevil and the Black Widow to stop the Mandrill and his mutant ally Nekra from taking over the White House. Nekra later escaped captivity and killed Patrick. Shanna returned to Africa when the Cult of Kali priest Raga Shah killed Jakuna and her leopards, Ina and Biri. Shanna spent two years unsuccessfully hunting Raga Shah before moving to San Pedro, California, to seek psychiatric help. During this time, she raised a giant python named Ananta. A chance encounter eventually allowed Shanna to track down Raga Shah and feed him to Ananta.

Shanna returned to the Savage Land and became Ka-Zar's lover, discovering that their home was part of a larger realm known as Pangea. Their early relationship was volatile, and Shanna briefly married a Botor widower named Mele, who died in a hunting accident. She was also targeted by the demon Belasco, who believed she resembled his lost love Beatrice. When Ka-Zar was seemingly killed in New York, a distraught Shanna was institutionalized and nearly romanced Peter Parker. Spider-Man helped a revived Ka-Zar rescue her, and the couple returned to Antarctica. They married despite further interference from Belasco and others. Shanna and Ka-Zar had a son named Matthew, employing a native warrior named Zhira as his nanny and protector.

Following the temporary destruction of the Savage Land by Terminus, Shanna returned to Africa for a time and briefly separated from Ka-Zar after the two discovered an underground prehistoric world. She ultimately returned to the Savage Land, where she and Ka-Zar fought to preserve the region from external threats and technological pollution. Shanna briefly gained a mystical bond to the spirit of Africa to defeat Sir Guy Cross-Wallace, and the High Evolutionary once granted her power over the natural world.

Shanna was later killed in the Savage Land but was resurrected using the blood of a native Man-Thing. This process tied her life force directly to the land. Due to this connection, the Cotati took control of her mind during their attempted invasion of Earth. (Note: Colati's invasion of Earth takes place during the "Empyre" event.) Ka-Zar and his allies helped Shanna break free from their control. When Ka-Zar was killed in the ensuing battle against the Cotati, Shanna saved his life by submerging him in the same Man-Thing waters that resurrected her, granting him a similar connection to the Savage Land. Afterward, the Phoenix Force selected Shanna as a potential host before it ultimately chose Echo.

=== Powers and abilities ===
Shanna is a gymnast and an Olympic-class athlete possessing extraordinary agility. Her hunting, foraging, healing, and fighting skills are trained to the absolute limits of human capacity. As a trained veterinarian, she is highly skilled in working with wild animals. In combat, she utilizes primitive paraphernalia, including weapons such as knives, spears, and a bow and arrows. Following her resurrection, Shanna became tied to the Savage Land, granting her an inherent knowledge of the region's languages and history. Additionally, this connection provides her with superhuman strength and speed.

== Reception ==
Commentary on Shanna, from her creation through her most recent appearances, has centered on the sexualized visual presentation of the character. Stan Lee's stated goal for the character, alongside Night Nurse and The Claws of the Cat, was in part "to appeal to the male readers who liked looking at pretty girls." Editor Roy Thomas said this readership shaped early creative decisions on the book: he paired penciller Ross Andru with inker Vince Colletta specifically "to make Ross's Shanna look attractive." Reflecting on the title's run decades later, Thomas said Marvel's attempt to draw back female readers with Shanna the She-Devil, Night Nurse, and The Claws of the Cat did not succeed, and that the Shanna title instead attracted "guys who liked looking at good-looking girls."

Reviewers of Frank Cho's 2013 Savage Wolverine connected the character's depiction to the earlier "jungle queen" genre, in which heroines were conventionally drawn in "leopard print bikinis." Jesse Schedeen of IGN described the series' "definite cheesecake quality," writing that Shanna "parades around in her skimpy bikini and slides through the mud." In a review of Shanna the She-Devil: Survival of the Fittest #3, Schedeen wrote that Shanna was "a little too chest-heavy" to plausibly perform some of her acrobatics, and that comics of this type are "all about the art," with the story existing mainly to be "ogled." An AIPT review made a similar point about Cho's rendering of the character, suggesting the story existed largely to showcase his skill at drawing women's bodies, and used its accompanying image captions to comment directly on how Shanna's figure was framed on the page.

A 2021 retrospective review of the collected Savage Wolverine run for AIPT wrote that the book "shows its age" in its depiction of Shanna, who is "constantly framed so her breasts can be in focus," and describing the character's treatment as "male-gazey." The review noted that Shanna is written to repeatedly prove her competence and is never placed in "sexually disrespectful" situations, but argued that the visual framing of her body "hinders the pacing and framing of the story" and that enjoying the book required readers to "ignore the oversexualized nature of Shanna."

Marc Buxton of Den of Geek took a more favorable view of the same series, praising Frank Cho's artwork and pacing and arguing that Savage Wolverine functioned as much as a vehicle for Shanna as for its title character; Buxton also noted that Wolverine's stories are traditionally free of the "colonialism, racism" associated with earlier jungle-adventure fiction, since the Savage Land setting removes real-world geography from the genre.

Shanna's original writer has also commented on this pattern. Asked for her thoughts on later versions of the character, Seuling said she wanted to see the character move away from "reincarnations where she looks like Scarlett Johansson in a teeny leopard bikini" and instead be portrayed decades older, working in African wildlife conservation.

== In other media ==
=== Television ===
- Shanna the She-Devil, referred to as Shanna the Jungle Queen, appears in the Spider-Man and His Amazing Friends episode "7 Little Superheroes", voiced by Janet Waldo.
- Shanna the She-Devil appears in X-Men: The Animated Series, voiced by Megan Smith. This version is Ka-Zar's wife. Much like Ka-Zar, this iteration appears to be a native of the Savage Land; rather than her classic background.

=== Games ===
- Shanna the She-Devil appears in X-Men Legends II: Rise of Apocalypse, voiced by Masasa Moyo.
- Shanna the She-Devil makes a cameo appearance in Amaterasu's ending in Marvel vs. Capcom 3: Fate of Two Worlds.
- Shanna the She-Devil appears in Marvel Heroes, voiced by Catherine Taber.
- Shanna the She-Devil appears as an unlockable playable character in Marvel: Avengers Alliance.
- Shanna the She-Devil appears in Marvel Snap.
- Shanna the She-Devil appears as a supporting character in the 2023 X-Men Resistance version of Zombicide.

== See also ==
- Cavewoman
- Sheena, Queen of the Jungle
