= Savage Wolverine =

2013 Marvel Comics ongoing series

- Cover of Savage Wolverine #1 (January 2013). Art by Frank Cho.

Publication information
- Publisher: Marvel Comics
- Schedule: Monthly
- Format: Ongoing series
- Genre: Superhero
- Publication date: January 2013
- No. of issues: 23

Creative team
- Created by: Frank Cho
- Written by: Frank Cho (#1-5); Zeb Wells (#6-8); Jock (#9-11); Phil Jimenez (#12-13); Scott Lope (#12-13); Richard Isanove (#14-17); Jen Van Meter (#18); Gail Simone(#19); Frank Tieri (#20); John Arcudi (#21-22)
- Artist(s): Frank Cho; Richard Isanove

Savage Wolverine was an ongoing comic book series published by Marvel Comics and starring Wolverine. The series began in January 2013 as part of Marvel's relaunch initiative, Marvel NOW!. The series ended after 23 issues.

== Publication history ==
Marvel Comics first teased the announcement of Savage Wolverine in October 2012 by releasing an image of the word "Savage" by Frank Cho. One week later a new Wolverine title was announced called Savage Wolverine. "This isn't just a solo Wolverine story. It's actually a team-up story with Shanna the She-Devil. Both Wolverine and Shanna have similar assertive personalities. The story is not just a quest to get home; it's a story about surviving each other's company and the Savage Land", said Cho.

Following the first story arc by Cho, the series shifts to a story by Zeb Wells and Joe Madureira which features a team-up of Wolverine, Spider-Man and Elektra.

== Plot ==
Wolverine awakens to find himself on a mysterious island in the Savage Land's inland sea. He is suddenly attacked by a Velociraptor and manages to easily slay it. While trying to find his way back to civilization, he stumbles upon some Neanderthals carrying a S.H.I.E.L.D. Agent and begins to fight them. During the fight, he has an encounter with Shanna the She-Devil who accidentally wounds Wolverine. Shanna states to Wolverine that she was with a bunch of S.H.I.E.L.D. Agents investigating a Cthulhu-like device until their airplane went down on the mysterious island.

The next morning, Wolverine wakes up upon falling out the tree he was sleeping in. He finds Shanna the She-Devil fighting off a dinosaur. Wolverine and Shanna the She-Devil set out to destroy the machine and encounter heavy Neanderthal resistance.

During the fight against the Neanderthals, Shanna the She-Devil ends up killed by one of the Neanderthals. Luckily for Wolverine, Amadeus Cho was also on the island and convinced the Neanderthals that he was their god and to help Shanna the She-Devil. Amadeus Cho tells them that the island had been a prison for a "Dark Walker" that was sealed on this island by a Celestial.

Using the life blood of a Man-Thing that was native to the Savage Land, the Neanderthal tribe resurrected Shanna the She-Devil. This left Shanna the She-Devil connected to the very life force of the Savage Land, giving her supernatural power. Amadeus Cho told Shanna the She-Devil what the Neanderthal natives had explained to him. The machine powering the damping field was also powering a prison, one holding an ancient hostile alien presence. Realizing that Wolverine would be releasing this creature, Shanna the She-Devil raced to stop him. She arrived in time with Amadeus Cho right behind her and was able to stop Wolverine. Suddenly, Hulk appeared before them.

When Hulk wonders where he is, Amadeus Cho tells him that he is in the Savage Land and tells Hulk and Wolverine to stand down. Just then, they are attacked by giant gorillas. During the fight with the giant gorillas, the dampening field is accidentally damaged during the fight which freed the alien Morrigon (who was the "Dark Walker") who flees from Earth. Morrigon returns to his master Visher-Rakk, an alien with the same planet-eating motive as Galactus. Morrigon told Visher-Rakk of a galaxy filled with planets for him to feed on.

== Collected Editions ==
Title	Material collected	Publication date	ISBN
Savage Wolverine Vol. 1: Kill Island	Savage Wolverine #1-5	August 2013	978-0785168409
Savage Wolverine Vol. 2: Hands on a Dead Body	Savage Wolverine #6-11	February 2014	978-0785168416
Savage Wolverine Vol. 3: Wrath	Savage Wolverine #12-17	July 2014	978-0785154860
Savage Wolverine Vol. 4: The Best There Is	Savage Wolverine #18-23	December 2014	978-0785154877
