= Liberty Meadows =

American comic by Frank Cho

Publication information
- Publisher: Creators Syndicate (when syndicated); Insight Studios (#1–26, Wedding Special); Image Comics (#27–present, Sourcebook)
- Schedule: Bimonthly (#1–3, #19–36); Monthly (#4–18); Irregular (#37–>)
- Format: Comic strip Ongoing comic book
- Publication date: Syndicated comic strip: March 30, 1997 to December 31, 2001; Comic book: 1999–2004, 2006
- No. of issues: 37 + 2 specials

Creative team
- Created by: Frank Cho
- Written by: Frank Cho
- Artist(s): Frank Cho

Collected editions
- Book 1: Eden: ISBN 1-58240-301-5

Liberty Meadows is an American comic strip and comic book series created, written and illustrated by Frank Cho. It relates the comedic activities of the staff and denizens of the eponymous animal sanctuary/rehabilitation clinic. The comic strip launched on March 31, 1997, and ran until December 30, 2001.

== Publication history ==
Liberty Meadows is the evolution of University² (University Squared), a strip Cho wrote during his college years for The Diamondback, the student newspaper at the University of Maryland, College Park.

Originally, it was syndicated and appeared in many newspapers, while also being collected in comic books produced by Insight Studios. At the end of 2001, Cho ceased syndication, partly because editors kept censoring it, and announced he would publish it directly in comic book format.

Cho self-published the comic book at first, with Image Comics taking over printing and distribution with issue #27. The comic book went on a hiatus in early 2004, after issue #36. June 2006 saw the publication of issue #37, and Cho commented at the time that he would be "trying to have a couple of issues of Liberty Meadows out per year". Issue #37 was the first issue that did not contain material previously published in newspapers, also being the last issue published to date.

From around 2008 until May 2011, the rights to Liberty Meadows were in the hands of Sony Pictures Digital which wanted to develop it as a downloadable series, and then Sony Pictures Television which wanted to develop it as an animated television series. After a change in executives at Sony the projects went inactive, and the rights reverted to Cho, who in May 2011 announced plans to publish issue #38. On February 5, 2012, Frank Cho stated that work on Liberty Meadows had effectively stopped due to other commitments. "I thought I could do Liberty Meadows and my Marvel and outside work but I can't. I have a mortgage and child support that I have to pay each month. As much as I want to do Liberty Meadows (believe me I want to), the other jobs pay better".

== Style ==
Cho makes references to and parodies other comic strips, such as Dilbert, Cathy and Peanuts.

== Characters ==
=== The humans ===
- Brandy Carter – A beautiful animal psychiatrist. Her appearance is based on that of actress Lynda Carter, Bettie Page, and women Cho was attracted to in his youth.
- Frank Melisch – A nerdy veterinarian. Frank is in love with Brandy but afraid to tell her.
- Tony – An accident-prone maintenance man.
- Julius – The owner of Liberty Meadows animal sanctuary and an avid fisherman.
- Jen – Brandy's roommate, a sexy rocket scientist who enjoys toying with men.
- Al – Owner of Al's Treetop Tavern, the local bar where many of the other characters hang out. An educated man and believer in various conspiracies.
- Roger – Brandy's ex-fiancé who's trying to win her back.
- Barbara Carter – Brandy's controlling, malevolent mother. She hates Frank, and is constantly scheming to fix Brandy up with Roger.
- John Carter – Brandy's doting father. The complete opposite of Brandy's mother.
- Evil Brandy – Brandy's evil twin from a mirror universe. A megalomaniacal criminal mastermind. In volume 3, she tied up Brandy, duct-taped her mouth shut, and shoved her in a closet in an attempt to impersonate her and kill Frank.
- Alternate Frank / "Ace" – Frank's super-studly twin from a mirror universe. The most feared lawman in the world and Evil Brandy's nemesis.

A Liberty Meadows gallery
Tony	Ralph	Dean	Julius	Leslie	Jen	Truman	Oscar

=== The animals ===
- Ralph – A midget circus bear with a perpetual squint and a penchant for inventing dangerous gadgets.
- Dean – A former fraternity house mascot rescued by Brandy, Dean is a lecherous, sexist pig with a drinking problem and an addiction to cigarettes. Dean is at the clinic for detox but keeps breaking the rule forbidding smoking. A recurring segment has him hitting on various women in bars, only to have them beat him for his boorishness.
- Leslie - A dim-witted frog with hypochondria, and Ralph's friend.
- Truman – A cute, naive young duck who always addresses the humans as "sir" and "ma'am."
- Oscar – A mischievous dachshund and Truman's best friend. Oscar is the only animal in the strip who is not anthropomorphized, and does not speak aside from typical canine vocalizations.
- The Cow – A psychotic villain who suffers from mad cow disease.
- Khan – A giant catfish who serves as Julius' constant nemesis. He appears in strips that depict the characters fishing.
- Mike – A raccoon with obsessive–compulsive disorder.

=== The author ===
- Frank Cho, aka "Monkey Boy" – Creator of the strip. Appears in the strip as a chimpanzee to break the fourth wall.

== Collected editions ==
The comics collecting the daily strips have themselves been collected into a series of books:

ISG Hardcover	Collects	Deluxe Signed	Unsigned Trade
Liberty Meadows: Big Book of Love	# 1 – 5	1-889317-15-2	1-889317-14-4
Image Comics	Collects	Hardcover	Softcover
Liberty Meadows Book 1: Eden	# 1 – 9	1-58240-301-5	1-58240-390-2
Liberty Meadows Book 2: Creature Comforts	#10–18	1-58240-333-3	1-58240-432-1
Liberty Meadows Book 3: Summer of Love	#19–27	1-58240-401-1	1-58240-534-4
Liberty Meadows Book 4: Cold, Cold Heart	#28–36	1-58240-502-6	1-58240-720-7
Liberty Meadows: Cover Girl	#1–37 (covers)	1-58240-640-5	
Liberty Meadows 10th Anniversary Edition	# 1 – 9	1-58240-929-3	
Liberty Meadows Sunday Strips, vol. 1		1-60706-132-5	
Liberty Meadows Sunday Strips, vol. 2		1-60706-150-3	
Big Book of Love included an all new introduction piece and the Sunday strips, both in color. Eden also included the intro piece (in black and white), but did not include the Sunday strips.

== Awards ==
Frank Cho has won many awards, including: the prestigious National Cartoonists Society’s Awards for Best Book Illustration (2001) and Best Comic Book (2001), the 2008 Eagle Award, the 1994 Charles M. Schulz Award for Excellence in Cartooning, College Media Association for Cartooning, and Germany’s Max & Moritz Prize for Best International Comic Strip. He was also nominated for the Harvey and Eisner Awards.
