= Nekra =

Publication information
- Publisher: Marvel Comics
- First appearance: Shanna the She-Devil #5 (August 1973)
- Created by: Steve Gerber (writer); Ross Andru (artist)

In-story information
- Alter ego: Nekra Sinclair
- Species: Human Mutant
- Team affiliations: Lethal Legion; Black Spectre; Exiles
- Partnerships: Mandrill; Oya
- Notable aliases: Adrienne Hatros
- Abilities: Emotional empowerment; Magic user

Nekra (Nekra Sinclair) is a supervillain appearing in American comic books published by Marvel Comics. The character was created by Steve Gerber and Ross Andru for the 1973 comic book Shanna the She-Devil. She is a mutant whose mutation was caused by an atomic explosion at the Los Alamos Proving Grounds. She shares an origin with the mutant supervillain Mandrill, with whom she has a sibling-like bond. Nekra initially discovered her own superhuman durability while defending herself against the attack of a lynch mob.

== Publication history ==
Nekra first appeared in Shanna the She-Devil #5 (August 1973), and was created by Steve Gerber and Ross Andru.

The character subsequently appears in Marvel Two-In-One #3 (May 1974), Daredevil #109–112 (May–August 1974), Spider-Woman #13–16 (June–July 1979), #50 (June 1983), West Coast Avengers #2 (October 1985), The Vision and the Scarlet Witch #1–2 (October–November 1985), #12 (September 1986), Web of Spider-Man #46 (January 1989), Alpha Flight #79–80 (December 1989–January 1990), Avengers Spotlight #29 (February 1990), Avengers West Coast #65 (December 1990), and the graphic novel Avengers: Death Trap, the Vault (1991). The character does not appear for several years after that, until she reappeared in Witches #1 (August 2004), and The Loners #1 (June 2007), and #4–5 (September–October 2007). The character appears as a recurring member of the 198, appearing in X-Men comics of that era. She also appeared in Chaos War: Dead Avengers and Power Man and Iron Fist (vol. 3). During the Krakoan Age, Nekra appeared as a member of the Exiles, appearing in Sabretooth (vol. 4), Sabretooth & the Exiles, and Wolverine (vol. 7).

Nekra received entries in the original Official Handbook of the Marvel Universe #8, Official Handbook of the Marvel Universe Deluxe Edition #9, and All-New Official Handbook of the Marvel Universe A–Z #8 (2006).

== Fictional character biography ==
Nekra is African-American, but was born a mutant with pale skin and vampire-like fangs due to her mother Gemma being exposed to radiation at Los Alamos National Laboratory decades prior. As a result, she is neglected and runs away to live in the wilderness at the age of 14. She soon encounters Jerome Beechman, who had been mutated by the same explosion. Although his parents are white, he was born dark-skinned and had developed fur and baboon-like features, for which he had named himself Mandrill. For six years, the two live by theft and scavenging until they are attacked by a lynch mob who believe them to be monsters. During the battle, Nekra discovers that she possesses superhuman durability. She and Mandrill escape and develop a sibling-like bond.

Nekra later falls in love with the Grim Reaper. When the Grim Reaper dies in combat, Nekra briefly resurrects him as a zombie. Nekra manages to resurrect the Grim Reaper again, with the condition that he must kill one person every 24 hours to remain alive. The Reaper chooses Nekra as his first victim and kills her.

Sensing the potential threat of Doctor Druid, Daimon Hellstrom uses his magic to resurrect Nekra and has her investigate Druid. First, she seduces Doctor Druid, which negates his powers, but he manages to regain them via sacrifice. Nekra then shoots Druid in the forehead, killing him.

At some point, Nekra accepts citizenship of the sovereign mutant nation Krakoa and becomes involved with Oya. When the two of them kill several mercenaries who were invading Krakoa, they are sentenced to the Pit of Exile for breaking Krakoa's law against murder. Arriving in the pit's simulated reality, they are greeted by Sabretooth, who promises to torture them as practice. When a fight between Sabretooth and Melter almost kills everyone in the pit, Nekra and Oya are saved when Third-Eye drags their consciousnesses to the astral plane. Shortly afterwards, they meet with Cypher, who informs them that Sabretooth has betrayed them and escaped the Pit on his own. Cypher allows the two to leave alongside Toad and Nanny and Orphan-Maker, tasking the group with hunting down Sabretooth so he can be punished for his crimes. The team sails away on a boat made by Madison Jeffries, with Nekra assuring Oya that they will never return to Krakoa.

After Nanny and Jeffries build a new suit for Orphan-Maker, the team escapes with the freed Orchis prisoners on their boat, which Jeffries transforms into a vessel big enough to contain them all. Sabretooth decides to enact one last plan for revenge against the Quiet Council of Krakoa by turning all the young mutant prisoners against Krakoa, but is interrupted when the team arrive at the final, underwater Orchis base and are hit by a tidal wave. During the commotion, Sabretooth is again abducted by Orchis, telling his team to come looking for him before disappearing. The rest of the team are trapped in the base with the children, who attack them out of fear. Nanny shuts down the brains of everyone except herself and Orphan-Maker, who takes in the children.

== Powers and abilities ==
Nekra possesses the mutant ability to increase her strength and durability by harnessing her emotions. At her peak, she can lift approximately 10 tons, withstand an explosion of about 100 pounds of TNT and extreme cold and heat. Her powers are limited by how long she can sustain her emotional state, generally for no more than an hour.
