= Zabu =

Fictional character

Publication information
- Publisher: Marvel Comics
- First appearance: X-Men #10 (March 1965)
- Created by: Stan Lee (writer); Jack Kirby (artist)

In-story information
- Full name: Zabu Plunder
- Species: Smilodon
- Place of origin: Savage Land
- Team affiliations: Agents of Wakanda; Pet Avengers
- Partnerships: Ka-Zar; Shanna the She-Devil
- Abilities: Smilodon physiology granting: Razor-sharp claws and teeth; Heightened sense of smell; Remarkable hearing; Two elongated front canine teeth ("saber-teeth"); Night vision; Near-human intellect; Slowed aging

Zabu is a fictional saber-toothed cat appearing in American comic books published by Marvel Comics. Zabu is connected primarily to the Savage Land, and the X-Men, and most recently the Avengers (by way of the "Pet Avengers"). He is the last known living Smilodon and is a companion and ally of Ka-Zar.

An earlier version was known simply as Zar, in the pulp version of Ka-Zar the Savage, featured in the Ka-Zar magazine.

== Publication history ==
He first appeared in X-Men #10 (March 1965), created by Stan Lee and Jack Kirby. Zabu starred in the Pet Avengers series.

== Fictional character biography ==
Zabu was born in the Savage Land. While still a cub, his mother and siblings were killed by human hunters. He wandered the Savage Land on his own, teaching himself how to survive as he grew to adulthood. His mate was among the Smilodons killed by a Man-Ape tribe led by Maa-Gor. Zabu encountered a young boy named Kevin Plunder as he was about to be attacked by a group of Man-Apes. Zabu saved Kevin, and the two became companions. Zabu protected the boy as he grew to adulthood, and eventually took on the name Ka-Zar, which means "Son of the Tiger". Zabu was brought to near-human intelligence due to exposure to radioactive mists.

Zabu helps Ka-Zar battle many enemies. For example, in Ka-Zar: Lord of the Hidden Jungle #3 they confront El Tigre and Maa-Gor's Man-God form. This particular battle resulted in El Tigre mentally controlling Zabu for a time, causing him to attack Ka-Zar. El Tigre lost control before any serious injuries happened. The assistance of Bobbi Morse was vital in rescuing Zabu's mind.

Ka-Zar marries Shanna the She-Devil and they later have a son named Matthew. Zabu befriends the Savage Land native, Zira, who becomes Matthew's nanny. He also assists when Gregor, a hunter, kidnaps Matthew.

=== New York, New York ===
Zabu left the Savage Land in at least one instance, venturing to New York City with Ka-Zar during marital difficulties; his master was having difficulty controlling an addiction to outside technology. Zabu had many adventures in New York City, as he assisted Ka-Zar and Shanna against Parnival Plunder, who wished to kill them all. In a follow-up to these sequence of adventures, as Kevin attempts to clear out their New York holdings, Zabu is forced to act as a seeing eye tiger. His master had been temporarily blinded and deafened in a subway shoot-out, framed for it and pursued by the police and the Punisher. During this, Zabu practices his jumping, as he keeps blowing them, causing property damage.

=== Amazing Spider-Man ===
In a Spider-Man family one-shot in issue #6, the secondary story is about Zabu having emotional troubles, knowing that he has no family left. Ka-Zar asked Peter to watch Zabu while he attends a world summit on global warming. Later, Peter's Aunt May, completely unaware that Zabu is hiding in the garage, told Peter that this is how she felt, knowing she has outlived her friends, husband, and relatives. Peter uses this to bond with Zabu. Peter took Zabu to a museum to interact with the fake saber-toothed cats on display, and they were almost caught by a guard. Peter told Zabu to pull a "Calvin and Hobbes" maneuver, to which he played as though he were a stuffed animal, leaving Peter stunned at Zabu's intelligence. Afterward, Zabu felt better and Ka-Zar picked him up from Spider-Man.

=== Avengers ===
Zabu is part of the resistance army when the Savage Land comes under attack by resource-stealing Skrulls disguised as S.H.I.E.L.D. agents. An array of Avengers help beat back this invasion, unaware of the Skrull involvement.

During the "Secret Invasion" storyline, Zabu was present when the Skrull ship landed in the Savage Land. He helped Shanna and Ka-Zar battle the Skrulls, killing the Skrull pretending to be Jessica Jones. Tie-in issues at this point flashback to Zabu assisting his family in battling the murderous S.H.I.E.L.D. impostors.

Zabu joined with other animal sidekicks to form the Pet Avengers. Mentally linked to each other by one of the Infinity Gems, they joined to fight Thanos. The gems were noted for increasing the intelligence of the animals. The mental link also includes Barack Obama's dog, Bo, an honorary member of the team. During the series, Zabu survives a confrontation with Devil Dinosaur and being swallowed by the monster Giganto. In another incident, Zabu and his fellow Pet Avengers travel to China to confront a small group of ancient dragons. This incident leads to them fighting the human Avengers. The confrontation ends well, earning Zabu and the others their own personal home-away-from-home on the grounds of the Avengers Mansion.

During the "Empyre" storyline, Zabu and Ka-Zar later work for the Avengers as part of the Agents of Wakanda. Ka-Zar's son Matthew has matured enough to join the family in defense of the Savage Land against the Cotati.

== Powers and abilities ==
Zabu possesses the natural abilities associated with saber-toothed cats like Smilodon. The character has powerful claws and teeth, a heightened sense of smell and hearing, and night vision. Zabu ages at a slow rate as well. Zabu developed near human intelligence because of a mutation caused by radioactive mists.

== Reception ==
=== Critical response ===
Kevin Lee of Screen Rant included Zabu in their "10 Best From DC & Marvel" list, while Bradley Prom included him in their "10 Best Animal Characters Who Should Join The MCU" list. Darby Harn of CBR.com ranked Zabu 10th in their "10 Most Iconic Pets In Marvel Comics" list, while Kevin Shaffery ranked him 8th in their "15 Coolest Pets In Comic Books" list, and Michael Austin ranked him 10th in their "10 Most Powerful Animals In Marvel Comics" list. The A.V. Club ranked Zabu 21st in their "21 Top Superhero Pets" list.

== Other versions ==
=== Marvel Zombies ===
Zabu and Ka-Zar are seen infected with the zombie virus, eating Barbarus and other super-powered inhabitants of the Savage Land.

=== Ultimate Marvel ===
In the Ultimate Marvel universe, Zabu is a normal tiger with Smilodon-like fangs. Flashbacks reveal that Zabu, Shanna, and Ka-Zar have been together since childhood.

== In other media ==
=== Television ===
- Zabu appears in the Spider-Man episode "The Hunter and the Hunted".
- Zabu appears in X-Men: The Animated Series.
- Zabu appears in The Super Hero Squad Show, with vocal effects provided by Steve Blum. This version wears a collar made from Star Quartz, a material capable of binding and merging any metal in the presence of Vibranium.
- Zabu appears in Ultimate Spider-Man as a member of the New Warriors.
- Zabu makes a cameo appearance in the Hulk and the Agents of S.M.A.S.H. episode "Savage Land".

=== Video games ===
- Zabu makes a cameo appearance in Amaterasu's ending in Marvel vs. Capcom 3.
- Zabu appears in Marvel: Avengers Alliance.
- Zabu appears in Marvel Snap.
- Zabu makes a cameo appearance in Marvel Tōkon: Fighting Souls in the Savage Land stage.

=== Merchandise ===
- Zabu received a figure in Toy Biz's "X-Men: Savage Land" set alongside Ka-Zar.
- Zabu, alongside Ka-Zar, received a 7-inch statue from sculptor Mark Newman.
- Zabu received a figure in HeroClix's "The Incredible Hulk" expansion set alongside Ka-Zar.
