= Frank Cho =

Korean-American comic strip and comic book creator (born 1971)

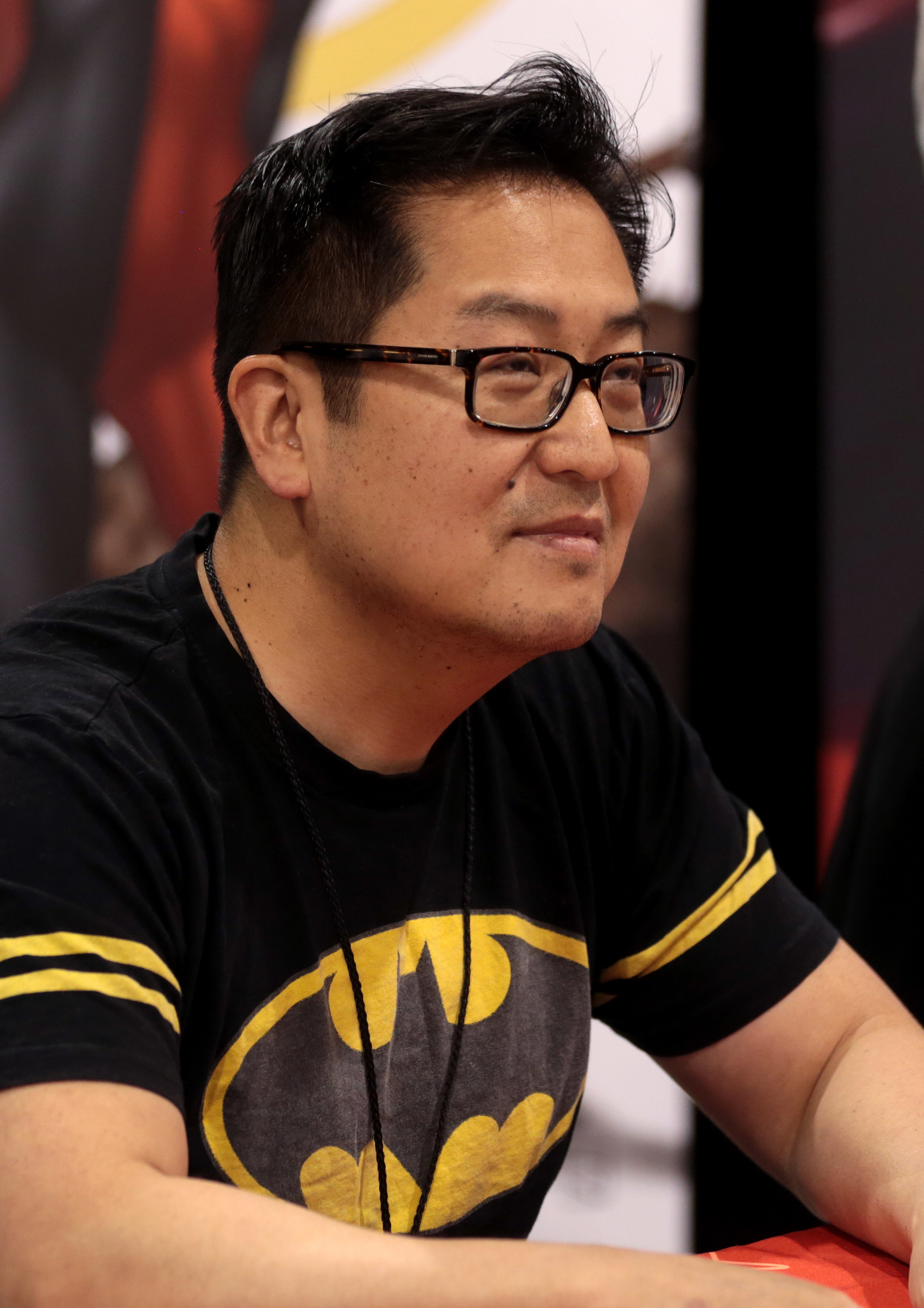
- Cho at the 2018 Phoenix Comic Fest
- Born: Duk Hyun Cho; 1971 (age 54–55) Seoul, South Korea
- Areas: Cartoonist, Writer, Penciller, Inker
- Notable works: Liberty Meadows
- Awards: 2006 Haxtur Award for Best Artist; 2006 Haxtur Award for Best In Show; 2001 National Cartoonists Society's Award for Best Comic Book; 2001 National Cartoonists Society's Award for Best Book Illustration; Charles M. Schulz Award for Excellence in Cartooning; Max & Moritz Medal for Best International Comic Strip

Frank Cho (born Duk Hyun Cho; Korean: 조덕현; 1971) is a Korean-American comic strip and comic book writer and illustrator, known for his series Liberty Meadows, as well as for books such as Shanna the She-Devil, Mighty Avengers and Hulk for Marvel Comics, and Jungle Girl for Dynamite Entertainment. Cho is noted for his figure drawing, precise lines, and depictions of curvaceous women.

== Early life ==
Frank Cho was born near Seoul, South Korea in 1971 to Kyu Hyuk Cho and Bok Hee Cho. He has two brothers, Rino and Austin. The family moved to the United States when he was six in search of better economic opportunities. Cho was raised in Beltsville, Maryland.

His parents had college degrees, but because they did not speak English well, they took whatever jobs they could to support the family. His mother worked in a shoe factory, and his father was a carpenter during the day and a janitor at a Greyhound Bus station at night. Because money was scarce, Cho, who describes his latchkey childhood as "rough", was relegated to finding his own extracurricular entertainment. When Cho was ten, his older brother, Rino, brought some comic books home, and Cho started copying the art. When a friend saw that Cho could reproduce the artwork without tracing it, he urged Cho to illustrate comics for a living. Cho refined his abilities without formal training beyond some basic art classes. He found inspiration in Depression-era comics such as Prince Valiant and Li'l Abner, and in the work of artists such as Norman Rockwell, N.C. Wyeth, Andrew Loomis, Al Williamson and Frank Frazetta.

After graduating from High Point High School in 1990, he attended Prince George's Community College and was offered a scholarship to the Maryland Institute College of Art in Baltimore, which he declined because he disliked the school's academic focus. Cho's parents were not particularly supportive of Cho's interest in art, so he placated them by transferring to the University of Maryland School of Nursing, which he says was his parents' idea. Cho graduated with a B.S. in Nursing in 1996.

== Career ==
=== 1990s ===
Cho wrote and drew a cartoon strip called Everything but the Kitchen Sink in the weekly Prince George's Community College newspaper The Owl, where he was also comics editor. At the University of Maryland, College Park, he drew the daily strip University^{2} for The Diamondback, the student newspaper.

During his final year in college, in 1994 or 1995, Cho received his first professional comic book assignment, doing short stories for Penthouse Comix with Al Gross and Mark Wheatley. The trio conceived of a six-part "raunchy sci-fi fantasy romp" called The Body, centering on an intergalactic female merchant, Katy Wyndon, who can transfer her mind into any of her "wardrobe bodies", empty mindless vessels that she occupies to best suit her negotiations with the local alien races that she encounters while traveling the galaxy trading and seeking riches. The story was never published for a number of reasons.

After graduation, Cho adapted elements of University^{2} for use in a professionally syndicated strip, Liberty Meadows. Cho signed a 15-year contract with Creators Syndicate, which he later realized was unusually long and, perhaps jokingly, blamed on having a bad lawyer. After five years of doing Liberty Meadows, Cho grew weary of the arguments with his editor over the censorship of the strip, as well as the pressure of the daily deadlines, and pulled the strip from syndication in December 2001, though he continued to print it uncensored in book form.

In 1999, Cho attracted controversy when, while serving as one of the jurors for the third annual Ignatz Awards, which are awarded to small press creators or creator-owned projects published by larger publishers, he nominated his own book Liberty Meadows. Writer Ed Brubaker, one of the original jurors and developers of the award, criticized that year's jury for their lack of support and acknowledgment of independent works, and for allowing self-nomination. Brubaker also questioned whether the guidelines he and Expo board member Chris Oarr had developed for the Awards were provided to that year's judges. The Comics Journal reacted to this by saying that this revealed some flaws in the Ignatz nomination system, but Cho defended his decision, stating that in his opinion few of the submissions he received as a judge were deserving of nomination, and that the Ignatz coordinator he consulted instructed him to use his own judgment, as there were no rules against self-nomination. Cho eventually won two Ignatz Awards that year for Outstanding Artist and Outstanding Comic, and although he did not cast the winning vote, he called his self-nomination a mistake he would not repeat.

=== 2000s ===
As he worked on Liberty Meadows, he also did occasional cover work or anthology work for other publishers. These included Ultimate Spider-Man Super Special for Marvel Comics in 2000, The Savage Dragon #100 and The Amazing Spider-Man #46 in 2002, Hellboy: Weird Tales #6 in 2003 and Invincible #14 in 2004. He then began doing full interior work on other Spider-Man books for Marvel, including issues #5 and 8 of Marvel Knights Spider-Man in 2004 and 2005, respectively, and The Astonishing Spider-Man #123, also in 2005.

Marvel Comics' then-senior editor Axel Alonso, who had been impressed by Liberty Meadows, approached Cho about revamping the third-string character Shanna the She-Devil, a scantily clad jungle lady who first appeared in the early 1970s, as a college-educated defender of wildlife and opponent of firearms. Cho, seeing possibilities, recast Shanna in a seven-issue, 2005 miniseries as an Amazonian naïf, the product of a Nazi experiment with the power to kill dinosaurs with her bare hands but an unpredictable lack of morality. The miniseries was originally meant to feature uncensored nude drawings of the heroine, but Marvel later decided against this, and had Cho censor his already completed pages for the first five issues. However, Cho has indicated on his website that Marvel plans to release a hardcover collection under its MAX imprint which will contain the uncensored artwork.

Cho then penciled issues 14 and 15 of Marvel's New Avengers in 2006, and illustrated the first six issues of Marvel Comics' 2007 relaunch of Mighty Avengers with writer Brian Bendis. He is the plotter and cover artist of Dynamite Entertainment's Jungle Girl. Cho drew issues 7–9 of Hulk, which were published in 2009. In 2010–2011, Cho illustrated writer Jeph Loeb's run on New Ultimates for Marvel Comics. In 2011 he worked on the miniseries X-Men: Schism with writer Jason Aaron.

=== 2010s ===
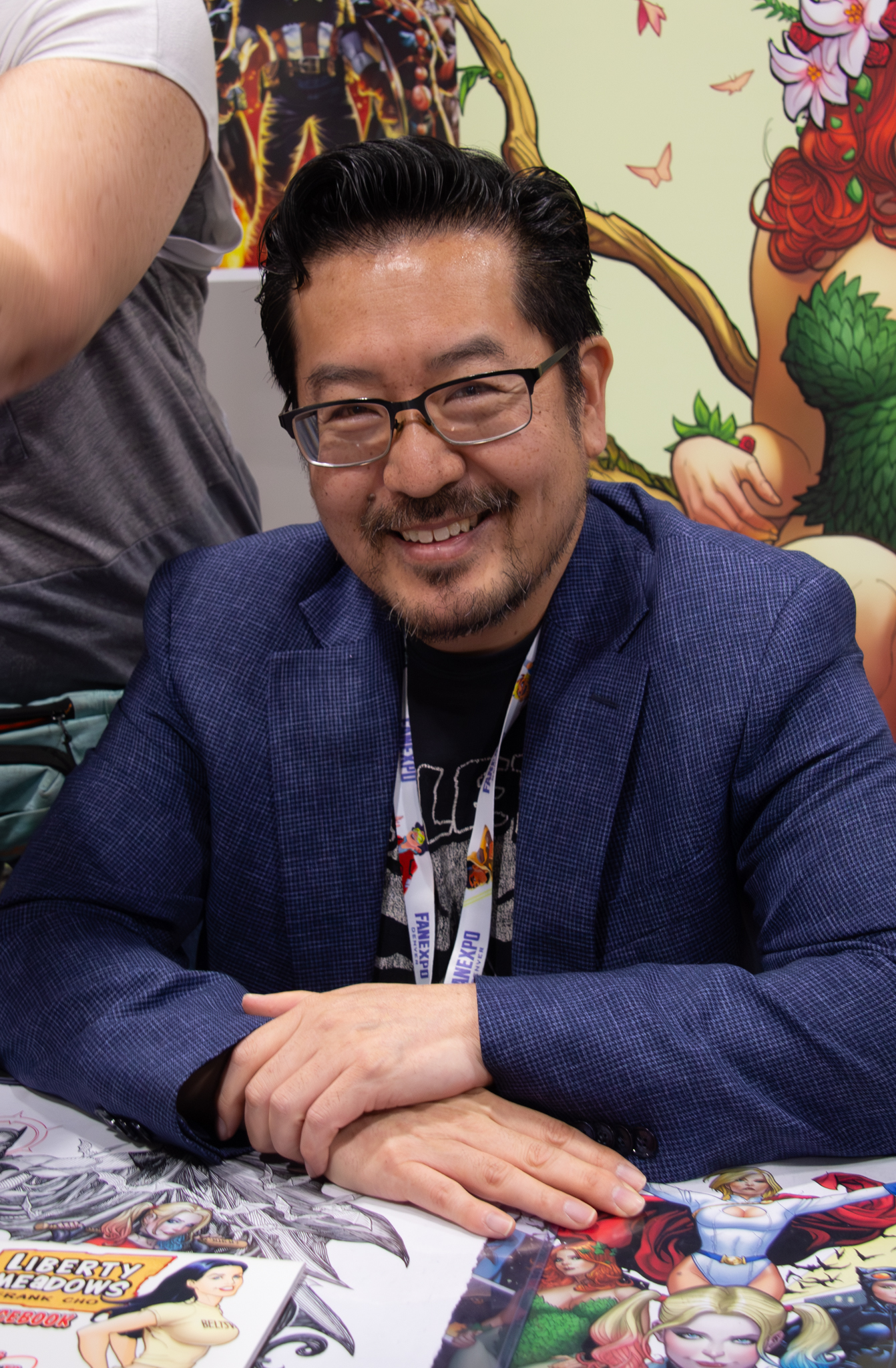
Frank Cho at Fan Expo Denver 2026

In January 2013, as an expansion of the Marvel NOW! initiative, Marvel premiered Savage Wolverine, a series written and illustrated by Cho that stars both Wolverine and co-stars Shanna the She-Devil and Amadeus Cho. The "Lost World"–type story that comprises the first five issues is intended to evoke a "classic adventure feel", and is inspired by the Indiana Jones films and the pulp horror of H.P. Lovecraft's Cthulhu Mythos.

In April 2015, Cho posted on his website an image he had drawn on a sketch cover of Spider-Gwen of that character on all fours, with her rear end pointing upward, which mirrored a Spider-Woman cover by Milo Manara that had caused a controversy the previous November. The Cho image drew criticism from Spider-Gwen writer Robbi Rodriguez, who, while expressing appreciation of Manara's work, feared that such an image might drive away prospective female readers. Sam Maggs of The Mary Sue also criticized Cho because the character Spider-Gwen is a teenager. Other artists like J. Scott Campbell and Rob Liefeld defended Cho. Cho parodied the controversy by drawing the character Harley Quinn in the same pose on a sketch cover of that character's series. In April the following year, Cho revisited the controversy by illustrating the character Cammy in the same type of pose on the cover of Udon Studios' Street Fighter Legends #1. When asked if these controversies hurt his career, Cho replied that the publicity tripled the traffic on his website, increased attention given to him by convention organizers and convention attendees, and led to an increase in job offers.

In February 2016, Marvel premiered Totally Awesome Hulk, a series written by Greg Pak and drawn by Cho which sees teenager Amadeus Cho become the newest incarnation of the Hulk. Cho drew the first four issues of the series, his final page of which represented the end of his 14-year exclusivity contract with Marvel. He was then hired by DC Comics to draw variant covers of the first 24 issues of Wonder Woman as part of the company's Rebirth initiative. However, Cho quit the project in July following the completion of the sixth issue's cover, due to conflicts with series writer Greg Rucka, who objected to the sexualized manner in which Wonder Woman was depicted in Cho's illustrations.

As of May 2016, Cho was writing and drawing Skybourne for Boom! Studios, a five-issue creator-owned miniseries that Cho describes as "a cross between Highlander, Game of Death, and Cthulhu." The story focuses on a god trying to find the one weapon that can kill him, the mythical sword Excalibur, before it is found by others. At the time Cho was also writing and drawing another creator-owned book, World of Payne with his co-creator, Tom Sniegoski, for Flesk Publications. World of Payne stars Lockwood Payne, a psychic private investigator, and modern day sorcerer from an ancient society of witches and wizards who with his urgent care expert friend Doctor Hurt, and the beautiful witch-in-training Michelle, find themselves embroiled in strange misadventures in the world of the occult. Cho describes the book part prose novel and part comic, and "a cross between Sherlock Holmes and Harry Potter with a dash of Hellblazer." Skybourne #1 was published September 7, while World of Payne was set to premiere in late 2016.

== Technique and materials ==
Cho produces his artwork on Strathmore 300 Series Bristol Pad, which has a vellum surface. To pencil his artwork, Cho uses a Pentel mechanical pencil with 0.7mm HB lead. To ink his work, he uses black Micron Pigma pens, sizes 01 and 08. For erasure, he uses both a Vanish eraser and a kneaded eraser.

== Personal life ==
Cho met his first wife, Cari Guthrie, when they served together on a student residence council at the University of Maryland. They were married in 1999. Their first child was born in 2001 and their second in 2004. They lived in Ellicott City, Maryland. Cho and Cari separated in 2008 and divorced in 2009, after which Cho temporarily moved to a nearby apartment to be close to his two children, and began dating Mara Rose, a film major he first met when she cared for his kids.

Cho identifies as a "life-long liberal Democrat and advocate for free speech and equal rights."

== Awards ==
- 1994 College Cartoonist Charles M. Schulz Award
- 1999 Ignatz Award for Outstanding Artist (for Liberty Meadows #1)
- 1999 Ignatz Award for Outstanding Comic (for Liberty Meadows #1)
- 2001 National Cartoonists Society's Award for Best Comic Book
- 2001 National Cartoonists Society's Award for Best Book Illustration
- 2002 Max & Moritz Medal for Best International Comic Strip
- 2006 Haxtur Award for Best Artist
- 2006 Haxtur Award for Best In Show
- 2006 Eagle Award for Best Artist (for Liberty Meadows and Shanna the She-Devil)
- 2006 Eagle Award for Best Artist for Best In Show (for Liberty Meadows and Shanna the She-Devil)
- 2008 Eagle Award for Favourite Comics Artist: Pencils
- 2011 The Emmy Award for the documentary Creating Frank Cho's World
- 2011 The Daily Record Influential Marylander Award for Communications
- 2017 Ringo Award for Best Cover Artist
- 2023 Doylean Honors for Best Illustration
- 2025 Raremarq Achievement Award

=== Nominations ===
- 2000 Eisner Award for Best Cover Artist
- 2006 Harvey Award for Best Artist
- 2006 Harvey Award for Best Cartoonist
- 2006 Harvey Award for Best Cover Artist
- 2006 Haxtur Award for Best Cover Artist
- 2006 Haxtur Award for Best Humor

== Bibliography ==
=== Story and art ===
==== DC ====
- Superman and Batman: World's Funnest, one-shot (various artists) (2000)
- The Many Worlds of Tesla Strong, one-shot (various artists) (2003)

==== Marvel ====
- Ultimate Spider-Man Special #1 (various artists) (2002)
- Marvel Knights Spider-Man #5, 8 (artist) (2004–05)
- Shanna, the She-Devil, miniseries, #1–7 (writer, artist) (2005)
- New Avengers #14–15 (artist) (2006)
- Mighty Avengers #1–6 (artist) (2007–08)
- Hulk, vol. 3, #7–9, King-Size #1 (artist) (2008–09)
- New Ultimates, miniseries, #1–5 (artist) (2010–11)
- X-Men: Schism, miniseries, #2 (artist) (2011)
- Avengers vs. X-Men, #0 (artist) (2012)
- Savage Wolverine #1–5 (writer, artist) (2013)
- X-Men: Battle of the Atom #1 (artist, with Stuart Immonen) (2013)
- Guardians of the Galaxy Annual #1 (artist) (2014)
- The Totally Awesome Hulk #1–4 (artist) (2015–16)

==== Other publishers ====
- University^{2} (writer, artist; in The Diamondback, University of Maryland 1994–1995)
- Liberty Meadows #1–26 (writer, artist; Insight Studios, 1999–2002)
- Liberty Meadows #27–37 (writer, artist; Image Comics, 2002–2006)
- Greyshirt: Indigo Sunset #6 (artist; America's Best Comics, 2001)
- More Fund Comics: "Road to Home", graphic novel (writer, artist; Sky Dog Press, 2003)
- Zombie King #0 (writer, artist; Image Comics, 2005)
- 50 Girls 50 #1–4 (co-writer, designer; Image, 2011)
- Skybourne #1–5 (writer, artist; BOOM Studios, 2016–2018)
- Fight Girls #1–5 (writer, artist; AWA/Upshot Studios, 2021)

=== Cover art ===
- Cavewoman: Jungle Tales #1 (Basement, 1998)
- Jingle Belle's All Star Holiday Hullabaloo #1 (Oni Press, 2000)
- Hammer of the Gods #1 (Insight Studios, 2001)
- Blue Line Pro's Sketch #12 (Blue Line Pro, 2001)
- Codename: Knockout #1 (Vertigo, 2001)
- Cavewoman: Pangaean Sea #1 (Basement, 2001)
- Footman 15: Fairy Fire #1 (Bald Guy Studios, 2002)
- The Amazing Spider-Man v2 #46–48 (Marvel, 2002–2003)
- Opposite Forces #4 (Funny Pages Press, 2003)
- PvP #1–2, 16 (Image, 2003–2005)
- Trouble #1 (Marvel, 2003)
- Hellboy: Weird Tales #6 (Dark Horse, 2003)
- Invincible #14 (Image, 2004)
- Even More Fund Comics (Sky Dog Press, 2004)
- Witchblade #80 (Top Cow, 2004)
- Marvel Knights 4 #13 (Marvel, 2005)
- Black Panther #3, 8, 18 (Marvel, 2005–2006)
- Uncanny X-Men #461 (Marvel, 2005)
- Nodwick #30 (Henchman, 2005)
- Image Holiday Special '05 (Image, 2005)
- Ms. Marvel #1–5 (Marvel, 2006)
- Red Sonja #13 (Dynamite, 2006)
- Savage Red Sonja: Queen of the Frozen Wastes #1–4 (Dynamite, 2006)
- Fear Agent: The Last Goodbye #1 (Dark Horse, 2007)
- The Irredeemable Ant-Man #7 (Marvel, 2007)
- Jungle Girl #0–5 (Dynamite, 2007–2008)
- Killing Girl #1 (Image, 2007)
- Ultimates 3 #3 (Marvel, 2008)
- Mighty Avengers #7 (Marvel, 2008)
- Conan the Cimmerian #1–9 (Dark Horse, 2008–2009)
- Captain America #41 (Marvel, 2008)
- Secret Invasion #6 (Marvel, 2008)
- Jungle Girl Season 2 #1–5 (Dynamite, 2008–2009)
- Fantastic Four #561 (Marvel, 2009)
- Masquerade #1 (Dynamite, 2009)
- Jennifer's Body (Boom! Studios, 2009)
- The Astounding Wolf-Man #18 (Image, 2009)
- War Heroes #3 (Image, 2009)
- Dark Reign: The List – Avengers #1 (Marvel, 2009)
- Dark Reign: The List – Daredevil #1 (Marvel, 2009)
- Dark Reign: The List – X-Men #1 (Marvel, 2009)
- Dark Reign: The List – Hulk #1 (Marvel, 2009)
- Dark Reign: The List – Punisher #1 (Marvel, 2009)
- Dark Reign: The List – Secret Warriors #1 (Marvel, 2009)
- Dark Reign: The List – Wolverine #1 (Marvel, 2009)
- Dark Reign: The List – The Amazing Spider-Man #1(Marvel, 2010)
- Hit-Monkey #1 (Marvel, 2010)
- Hulk #21 (Marvel, 2010)
- The Incredible Hulk #608 (Marvel, 2010)
- Astonishing Spider-Man & Wolverine #1 (Marvel, 2010)
- Ultimate Avengers vs. New Ultimates #1, 3, 5 (Marvel, 2011)
- 50 Girls 50 #1–4 (Image, 2011)
- The Incredible Hulks #629 (Marvel, 2011)
- The Amazing Spider-Man #663–664 (Marvel, 2011)
- Ultimate Spider-Man #159 (Marvel, 2011)
- Ultimate Avengers Vs New Avengers #5 (Marvel, 2011)
- X-Men: Schism #1, 3–5 (Marvel, 2011)
- Wolverine & the X-Men #1 (Marvel, 2011)
- Uncanny X-Men v2 #1 (Marvel, 2011)
- Fear Itself Fearless #1 (Marvel, 2011)
- Loki: Agent of Asgard #1 (Marvel, 2014)
- Where Monster Dwell #1-4 (Marvel, 2015)
- Miracleman #2 (Marvel, 2015)
- Wonder Woman #1–6 (DC, 2016)
- Street Fighter Legends: Cammy #1 (Udon, 2016)
- Trinity #2 (DC, 2016)
- Harley and Her Gang of Harleys #4–6 (DC, 2016)
- Harley Quinn: Harley Loves Joker #1–2 (DC, 2018)
- Reborn #1 (variant) (Image, 2016)
- Harley Quinn #8–56, 60–75 (DC, 2017–2020)
- Dejah Thoris #1 (Dynamite Entertainment, 2018)
- Amazing Spider-Man #799–800 (Marvel, 2018)
- The Incredible Hulk #717 (Marvel, 2018)
- Batman #48,50,71 (DC, 2018, 2019)
- Extermination #2 (Marvel, 2018)
- Punisher #1 (Marvel, 2018)
- Venom #7 (Marvel, 2018)
- The War of the Realms #1 (Marvel, 2019)
- Red Sonja #1 (Dynamite Entertainment, 2019)
- Vampirella #1 (Dynamite Entertainment, 2019)
- Gotham City Monsters #1 (DC, 2019)
- Black Cat #3 (Marvel, 2019)
- Catwoman: 80th Anniversary (DC, 2020)
- Action Comics #1026 (Wonder Woman 1984 variant) (DC, 2020)
- Punchline #1 (DC, 2020)
- Iron Man #5 (Marvel, 2021)
- Eternals #1 (Marvel, 2021)
- Wonder Woman Black & Gold #1 (DC, 2021)
- Invincible Red Sonja #1-10 (Dynamite, 2021)
- Future State: Superman of Metropolis WW84 #1 (DC, 2021)
- ET:ER #2 (Upshot/AWA Studios, 2022)
- Redemption #1 (Upshot/AWA Studios, 2022)
- Moon Knight:Black White & Blood #1 (Marvel, 2022)
- She-Hulk Omnibus #3 (Marvel, 2022)
- Absolution #1 (Upshot/AWA Studios, 2022)
- Ascencia #13 (Wake Entertainment, 2022)
- Harley Quinn 30th Anniversary Special #1 (DC, 2022)
- Poison Ivy #1 (DC, 2022)
- Fortnite X Marvel Zero War #3 (Marvel, 2022)
- Daredevil #7 (Marvel, 2023)
- Thor #30 (Marvel, 2023)
- 300: 25th Anniversary #1 (Dark Horse, 2023)
- Batman #134 (DC, 2023)
- Batman: The Brave and the Bold #1 (DC, 2023)
- Red Light #1 (AWA Studios, 2023)
- Catwoman #55 (DC, 2023)
- Green Arrow #1 (DC, 2023)
- Poison Ivy #13 (DC, 2023)
- Savage Red Sonja #1-5 (Dynamite, 2023)
- Batman #138-140 (DC, 2023)
- Superman #7 (DC, 2023)
- Supergirl Special #1 (DC, 2023)
- TMNT Last Ronin: Lost Years #5 (IDW, 2023)
- Birds of Prey #1 (DC, 2023)
- Catwoman #69-Present (DC, 2024)
- G'nort's Swimsuit Edition: Power Girl #1 (DC, 2024)
- Poison Ivy #22-23 (DC, 2024)
- Witchblade #1 (Image, 2024)
- Action Comics #1068 (DC, 2024)
- Superman #16 (DC, 2024)
- Batman Superman Worlds Finest #35 (DC, 2025)
- Wonder Woman #17 (DC, 2025)
- New History of the DC Universe: Black Canary #2 (DC, 2025)
- Batman #161 (DC, 2025)
- Zatanna #5 (DC, 2025)
- Superman Unlimited #3 (DC, 2025)
- Detective Comics #1101 (DC, 2025)
- Comic Book Creator: Len Wein #41 (TwoMorrows Publication, 2025)
- Harley Quinn and Elvira #1 (DC/Dynamite, 2025)
- Harley Quinn: Pumpkin Spicy #55 (DC, 2025)
- DC K.O. #1 (DC, 2025)

=== Books ===
- University Squared: The Angry Years, Insight Studios Group, 1996 (author, artist)
- Frank Cho Illustrator, Insight Studios, 2000 (author, artist)
- Liberty Meadows, Big Book of Love, Insight Studios, 2001 (author, artist)
- Liberty Meadows Book 1, Eden, Image, 2003 (author, artist)
- Liberty Meadows Book 2, Creature Comforts, Image, 2003 (author, artist)
- Liberty Meadows Book 3, Summer of Love, Image, 2004 (author, artist)
- Liberty Meadows Book 4, Cold, Cold Heart, Image, 2005 (author, artist)
- Women: Selected Drawings & Illustrations, Image, 2006 (author, artist)
- Modern Masters Volume 14: Frank Cho, TwoMorrows Publishing, 2007
- Jungle Queens Art Book, Brand Studio Press, 2008 (author, artist)
- Mars Maidens Art Book, Brand Studio Press, 2008 (author, artist)
- Apes and Babes Volume 1, Image, 2009 (author, artist)
- Liberty Meadows Sundays Book 1, Image, 2012 (author, artist)
- Women Book 2: Selected Drawings & Illustrations, Image, 2013 (author, artist)
- Drawing Beautiful Women: The Frank Cho Method, Flesk Publications, 2014 (author, artist)
- Frank Cho's Savage Wolverine, Artist Edition, IDW 2018 (author, artist)
- Ballpoint Beauties, Flesk Publications, 2019 (author, artist)
- Marvel Monograph: The Art of Frank Cho, Marvel, 2020 (artist)
- The Art of Frank Cho: Twenty Year Retrospective, Flesk Publications, 2020 (author, artist)
- Outrage, Book 1, Comic Sketch Art, 2021 (author, artist)
- Outrage, Book 2: More Outrage, Comic Sketch Art, 2022 (author, artist)
- What Child Is This?, HarperCollins, 2022 (artist)
- Outrage, Book 3: Even More Outrage, Comic Sketch Art, 2023 (author, artist)
- Outrage, Book 4, Comic Sketch Art, 2024 (author, artist)
- Outrage, Book 5, Comic Sketch Art, 2025 (author, artist)
- Illustrators Issue 49, The Book Palace, 2025
