= Ka-Zar (Kevin Plunder) =

Fictional character appearing in American comic books published by Marvel Comics

- Ka-Zar with his Smilodon Zabu. Art by Mike Mayhew.

Publication information
- Publisher: Marvel Comics
- First appearance: The X-Men #10 (March 1965)
- Created by: Stan Lee; Jack Kirby

In-story information
- Alter ego: Kevin Reginald Plunder
- Place of origin: Savage Land
- Team affiliations: Agents of Wakanda; Captain Britain Corps; Excalibur
- Partnerships: Zabu; Shanna the She-Devil
- Notable aliases: Kazar of the Savage Land; Lord of the Hidden Jungle
- Abilities: Near-superhuman strength and endurance; Ability to communicate with some animals; Skilled hunter, trapper, fisherman, forager; Survival expert

Kevin Reginald Plunder, also known as Ka-Zar, (Note: /ˈkeɪzɑːr/ KAY-zar, /ˈkeɪsɑːr/ KAY-sar) is a superhero appearing in American comic books published by Marvel Comics. Created by writer Stan Lee and artist Jack Kirby, the character first appeared in The X-Men #10 (March 1965). Kevin Plunder is the second character to use the codename Ka-Zar.

== Publication history ==
Cover to the X-Men #10 the first appearance of Ka-Zar and his sabretooth tiger, Zabu; art by Jack Kirby.

The second Ka-Zar started as a character similar to the first Ka-Zar, but also reminiscent of both Tarzan and of writer-artist Joe Kubert's 1950s caveman character, Tor. Created by Stan Lee and Jack Kirby in The X-Men #10 (March 1965), he lives in the dinosaur-populated Savage Land, which was hidden in Antarctica by extraterrestrials. The character was based on his pulp magazine namesake only to the extent that he used the same name and rough "jungle lord" concept, and Lee later admitted that he had never even read any of the original Ka-Zar stories.

Originally written as a primitive and belligerent savage who spoke in broken English, Ka-Zar later became more articulate and civilized, although he retained a certain degree of distrust toward civilization and was generally wary of outside visitors to the Savage Land. Kevin Plunder refers to himself as the "Lord of the Savage Land", a phrase others have adopted, but this is not a formal title.

Ka-Zar's first solo story was published in Marvel Super-Heroes #19 (1969), and the character had features in the black-and-white magazine Savage Tales and the color title Astonishing Tales. He has had five self-titled series, the first published in 1970–1971 (three issues, mostly reprints), the second, which continued the storyline from Astonishing Tales, in 1974-1977 (20 issues, subtitled Lord of the Hidden Jungle) written by Mike Friedrich, Gerry Conway, and Doug Moench, the third in 1981-1984, Ka-Zar the Savage, (34 issues) written by Bruce Jones and Mike Carlin, the fourth in 1997-1998 (20 issues) written by Mark Waid and drawn by Andy Kubert, and the fifth in 2011 (a five-issue miniseries) written by Paul Jenkins.

== Fictional character biography ==
Ka-Zar is Kevin Reginald, Lord Plunder, born in Castle Plunder, Kentish Town, London, England. He is the eldest son of Lord Robert Plunder, the English nobleman who discovered the Savage Land. After his father was killed by the barbaric Man-Ape natives led by Maa-Gor in the Savage Land, Plunder was found and raised by the saber-toothed cat Zabu, who possesses near-human intelligence thanks to a mutation caused by radioactive mists. "Ka-Zar" means "Son of the Tiger" in the language of the Man-Apes. Under his guidance, Ka-Zar became an expert hunter, trapper, and fisherman, living off the wild land.

In the Savage Land, some territories are populated by several human or humanoid tribes, and while most of them are on friendly terms with Ka-Zar, some of them consider him an outlander and an enemy. He acts more like an unofficial general protector, preventing outside commercial exploitation, such as poaching and mining, as well as enforcing peace between tribes and serving as goodwill ambassador to friendly visitors.

The original X-Men discovered the Savage Land, and Ka-Zar encountered them, battling Maa-Gor for the first time. He then encountered Daredevil for the first time, and battled his brother Parnival, who had become the supervillain called the Plunderer. He first battled Magneto's Savage Land Mutates alongside the X-Men. He then encountered the Hulk for the first time, and battled Umbu the Unliving. He was once 'tricked' into confronting Spider-Man after J. Jonah Jameson convinced him that Spider-Man was a menace when the wall-crawler's memory was erased and he was tricked into working with Doctor Octopus. Spider-Man's memory was restored during the fight, with Ka-Zar subsequently apologizing for the mistake and proclaiming Spider-Man as the most valiant opponent he had ever fought. Ka-Zar then battled Kraven the Hunter for the first time. Shortly after this encounter, Ka-Zar encounters Zaladane and Garokk for the first time. After the Savage Land became known to outsiders after the visit by the X-Men, many people began traveling to the territory. Ka-Zar has also become romantically involved with female visitors, the first being S.H.I.E.L.D. agent Barbara Morse (who later became the Avenger named Mockingbird). He first battled A.I.M., and met the Man-Thing.

Ka-Zar, during a search for the lost Zabu, later discovered Pangaea, an ancient refuge created by the Atlanteans. Ka-Zar and Shanna began to gradually fall in love. He then battles Belasco for the first time. After a meeting with A.I.M. spies disguised as scientists, Ka-Zar is shot in the head, but survives. He is flown to New York City, but escapes the plane at Kennedy Airport. With no memory and no ability to speak, he wanders New York, saving lives and fighting crime. His memory returns and he encounters Kraven The Hunter again, who has been released from prison by an A.I.M. agent to capture him. Saved by Shanna and Spider-Man, he is brought to the hospital where A.I.M. fakes his death to use him in a scheme. Escaping with Spider-Man's aid, he and Shanna return to the Savage Land. He later marries Shanna, who has taken the name Shanna the She-Devil.

Ka-Zar assisted the Avengers in their attempt to repel the space conqueror Terminus, but while they rescued many natives, they were unable to prevent the destruction of the Savage Land. Ka-Zar was rescued by the Avengers, but left the Savage Land for the civilized world. Together, he and Shanna had a son named Matthew. The territory was later reconstructed by the High Evolutionary using Garokk, and Ka-Zar and Shanna returned with their newborn and resumed their previous roles. Ka-Zar and Shanna separated for a time, but got back together before long. Ka-Zar fought and defeated Thanos in one of his many attempts to end life, and later sought the help of investigator Jessica Jones for assistance locating Zabu.

Shanna and Ka-Zar find Skrulls mining the rare metal vibranium in the Savage Land. Soon afterward as part of the Secret Invasion storyline, a Skrull ship crashes in the Savage Land releasing earlier versions of modern superheroes (who claim to be the originals replaced by Skrulls for some time), and who have escaped. Shanna and Ka-Zar soon learn, however, that these are simply more Skrulls in disguise. Spider-Man soon encounters Ka-Zar, Shanna, Zabu, and some of the natives accusing them of being Skrulls. Just then, the Captain America from the ship attacked thinking the same for Spider-Man. Ka-Zar, Shanna, and Zabu help Spider-Man fight Captain America until Captain America is hit by a dart, revealing him to be a Skrull imposter.

Ka-Zar later appears as a member of the Agents of Wakanda.

Ka-Zar would have trouble adjusting to his newly expanded senses while life in the Savage Land would come under threat by a precursor to its creation known as Domovoy the Flesh Weaver. He would work through this odd connection with the world, Kevin calls home now shared between him and his wife in the time needed to save their son from the Polyscion's plans of global terraforming.

In the meantime, between domestic concerns and globe trotting adventures, Ka-Zar would continue his work as an Agent of Wakanda. Working as a temporal explorer sent back to the distant past of the newly-formed Earth on an observation mission regarding its primordial defenders wellbeing on T'Challa's behalf. After an encounter with the ancient ancestors of Earth's Mightiest, during a battle with Kid Thanos of Titan, a rival time traveler, Ka-Zar's attempted return to his own time is waylaid by the Iron Inquisitor on orders from Mephisto. Finding himself stranded in an alien timeline on a world soon to be consumed by its still living iteration of Galactus, Ka-Zar poises himself for the fight of his life. He soon becomes Galactus' new herald in exchange for maneuvering this new handler into getting back to his home reality to warn the Avengers of the threat posed to their universe. Now backed by the Power Cosmic, the Savage Herald seeks out viable and uninhabited planets for Galactus to feed upon whilst navigating time and space to make his way home.

== Powers and abilities ==
Kevin Plunder is an athletic man with no superhuman powers. He fights using his own style of hand-to-hand combat shaped by years of surviving in the Savage Land. He has developed great skills in hunting, trapping, fishing, foraging, and general survival in the wild. He carries a 12-inch (300 mm) Bowie knife, and occasionally uses a sling, bow and arrow, and other primitive weapons. He can also communicate with some animals. It was revealed in Astonishing Tales #11, scripted by Roy Thomas, that Ka-Zar's and Zabu's physical abilities had been enhanced by passing through some mysterious mist. The mists later endowed other characters (Maa-Gor and El Tigre) with superhuman abilities.

After being healed by the same waters used to resurrect Shanna the She-Devil, Ka-Zar became tied to the life force of the Savage Land. He now boasts an even greater extrasensory connection with the primeval realm he calls home, Ka-Zar's senses having been expanded to the point he can literally share sensations with the Savage Land and its faunal denizens. He can even emit destructive energy pulses or mimic the strengths and abilities of the creature living within it.

When stranded on a parallel world in the distant past, Ka-Zar became a herald of that reality's iteration of the World Eater; being imbued with the space titan's Power Cosmic granted him all the myriad faculties that comes with such a position of power.

== Reception ==
=== Accolades ===
- In 2011, IGN ranked Ka-Zar 84th in their "Top 100 Comic Book Heroes" list.
- In 2022, Newsarama included Ka-Zar in their "Best Marvel characters left to adapt to the MCU" list.
- In 2022, Screen Rant included Ka-Zar in their "15 Best Black Panther Comics Characters Not In The MCU" list.
- In 2022, CBR.com ranked Ka-Zar 15th in their "Top 15 British Superheroes in the Marvel Universe" list.

== Other versions ==
Various alternate universe versions of Ka-Zar have appeared throughout the character's publication history. A version of Kevin Plunder, named Kavin Plundarr, is Gotowar Konanegg, a member of the Captain Britain Corps. In Earth X, Ka-Zar and Shanna were mutated into humanoid saber-toothed tigers. Ka-Zar the Hunter, a composite character based on Ka-Zar and Kraven the Hunter, appears in Spider-Geddon.

== In other media ==
=== Television ===
- Ka-Zar appears in the Spider-Man episode "The Hunter and the Hunted", voiced by Arlin Miller.
- Ka-Zar appears in X-Men: The Animated Series, voiced by Robert Bockstael.
- Ka-Zar appears in The Super Hero Squad Show, voiced by Kevin Sorbo.
- A young Ka-Zar appears in Ultimate Spider-Man, voiced by Steve Blum. This version uses various hand-made weapons including a spear, Bowie knives, and wrist-mounted weapons with retractable blades. After joining Spider-Man's New Warriors, Ka-Zar gains an upgraded version of his wrist weapons and a Bo staff.

=== Film ===
In 2009, Marvel Studios announced that Ka-Zar, among other Marvel properties, were being considered for development.

=== Video games ===
- Ka-Zar appears in X-Men Legends II: Rise of Apocalypse, voiced by John Cygan.
- Ka-Zar makes a cameo appearance in Amaterasu's ending in Marvel vs. Capcom 3 and Ultimate Marvel vs. Capcom 3.
- Ka-Zar appears as an NPC in Marvel Heroes, voiced by Crispin Freeman.
- Ka-Zar appears as an unlockable playable character in Marvel Avengers Alliance.
- Ka-Zar appears in Marvel Snap.
- Ka-Zar appears in Marvel Cosmic Invasion, voiced by Jacob Dudman.
- Ka-Zar makes a cameo appearance in Marvel Tokon: Fighting Souls in the Savage Land stage.

== Collected editions ==
Title	Material collected	Published date	ISBN
Marvel Masterworks: Ka-Zar Volume 1	Marvel Super-Heroes #19, Astonishing Tales #1-16, Savage Tales #1	2013	978-0785159575
Marvel Masterworks: Ka-Zar Volume 2	Astonishing Tales #17-20, Ka-Zar (vol. 2) #1-5, Shanna the She-Devil #1-5, Daredevil #110-112, material from Daredevil #109, Marvel Two-in-One #3	2018	978-1302909666
Marvel Masterworks: Ka-Zar Volume 3	Ka-Zar #6-9 and material from Savage Tales #6-11	2023	978-1-302-94918-1
Marvel Masterworks: Ka-Zar Volume 4	Ka-Zar #10-20, The X-Men #115-116; material from Rampaging Hulk #9, Marvel Fanfare #56-59	2025	978-1-302-95560-1
Ka-Zar: Guns of the Savage Land	original graphic novel	1990	978-0871356413
Ka-Zar: Savage Dawn	Ka-Zar the Savage #1-5	2017	978-1302905064
Ka-Zar the Savage Omnibus	Ka-Zar the Savage #1-34	June 2021	978-1302926786
Ka-Zar by Mark Waid and Andy Kubert Vol. 1	Ka-Zar (vol. 3) #1-7, -1	2011	978-0785143536
Ka-Zar by Mark Waid and Andy Kubert Vol. 2	Ka-Zar (vol. 3) #8-14, Annual '97	2012	978-0785159926
Ka-Zar: The Burning Season	Ka-Zar (vol. 4) #1-5	2012	978-0785155645
Ka-Zar: Lord of the Savage Land	Ka-Zar: Lord of the Savage Land #1-5	April 2022	978-1302927554
