= Garokk =

- Garokk as depicted in X-Men #115 (November 1978). Art by John Byrne.

Publication information
- Publisher: Marvel Comics
- First appearance: Astonishing Tales #2 (Nov. 1970)
- Created by: Roy Thomas (writer); Jack Kirby (artist)

In-story information
- Alter ego: Unknown (first body); Kirk Marston (second body)
- Species: Human mutate
- Partnerships: Zaladane; Magneto
- Notable aliases: The Petrified Man, Lazarus, Terminus
- Abilities: Energy and matter manipulation Shape-shifting; Telepathy; Superhuman strength, stamina and durability Immortality

Garokk (/ˈɡærɒk/; also known as the Petrified Man) is a fictional character appearing in American comic books published by Marvel Comics. He is a resident of the Savage Land and an enemy of the X-Men and Ka-Zar, and possesses a stone-like body and matter-manipulating abilities.

Garokk has made limited appearances in media outside comics. An uncredited actor voiced him in X-Men: The Animated Series, while Dwight Schultz voiced him in X-Men Legends II: Rise of Apocalypse.

== Publication history ==
Garokk first appeared in Astonishing Tales #2 (Nov. 1970) and was created by Roy Thomas and Jack Kirby.

== Creation ==
Roy Thomas explained in an interview the creation of the character stating,

"So, the Petrified Man clearly is similar to elements in the later Burroughs Tarzan novels where he'd have some kind of weird character that Tarzan would encounter. And Tongah was like a combination of Tarzan's native buddies that he would occasionally have. And it was also reference to one of my favorite series from Gold Key Comics Turok, Son of Stone. And so, Turok... Tongah... there was an element of that."

== Fictional character biography ==
Garokk was originally a sailor from Great Britain, whose ship, the H.M.S. Drake, crashed on the shores of Antarctica during the 15th century. The sailor was swept overboard and taken by a warm stream to the Savage Land. Wandering the Savage Land, the sailor entered the lands of the Sun People, who worshipped the sun god Garokk. The sailor found a statue of Garokk with a cup beneath it. Thirsty, the sailor drank from the cup, but was chased off by the Sun People. The sailor escaped to the Kingdom of England, but found that he had become immortal after drinking the potion. Over time, the sailor's body became a living, organic, stone-like substance until he looked identical to the statue of Garokk.

When the sailor, now known as the Petrified Man, returns to the Savage Land, he finds that its natives had been waging war as a form of worship, believing that he would return. He manages to stop a battle by dissolving the combatants' weapons, but goes insane and believes himself to be the god Garokk. Ka-Zar lures Garokk into an underground pool that removes his powers, causing him to age rapidly and die.

Zaladane later captures adventurer Kirk Marston and magically resurrects Garokk in Marston's body, which is transformed into a duplicate of Garokk's own. With Zaladane, Garokk attempts to unite the Savage Land tribes by forcing them to erect a colossal city for them. Garokk and Zaladane battle the X-Men and Ka-Zar; Garokk is defeated by Cyclops and falls into a thermal shaft. The X-Men believe Garokk to be dead. The X-Men's enemy Magneto later learns that Garokk survived and was transformed into a half-molten, half-crystal form. Magneto forces Garokk to serve as the guardian of his Antarctic base. In this role, he battles the X-Man Storm, but again falls into a deep pit.

Garokk survives and returned to his normal size and appearance. When the X-Men defeat the alien Terminus, leaving him to die, Garokk finds Terminus' armor and takes it for himself, devastating the Savage Land. The X-Men fought this "Terminus" and destroyed the armor to reveal Garokk. Garokk regains his free will and together with a machine made by the High Evolutionary, he restores the Savage Land to its original state. This process infuses Garokk's essence into the land, effectively killing him.

Garokk returns years later as an enemy of Ka-Zar, but Ka-Zar defeats him.

== Powers and abilities ==
Garokk's body consists of an organic, stone-like substance, giving him gray skin that seems rock-like and "petrified" in appearance. He has superhuman stamina and his petrified body also makes him difficult to injure. Garokk has the ability to project tremendous amounts of heat, light, and concussive force from his eyes. He can tap into other energy sources to replenish his own powers. Garokk has the ability to create dimensional warps with the energy projected from his eyes, and is capable of transporting an entire city through one of these dimensional portals. He has the ability to change his size and transform into a being of pure energy, and then back into his stone-like physical form at will. Garokk can also manipulate matter on a sub-atomic scale; he could rearrange the fabric of the Savage Land. He has a limited telepathic ability which allows him to learn of the activities of his worshippers through his dreams and his mental connection to his followers. Garokk is immortal; he does not age, and even when his body is destroyed, he can be brought back to life.

== Other versions ==
An alternate universe version of Garokk appears in 2099: World of Tomorrow, where he possesses the Sorcerer Supreme Mlle Strange.

== In other media ==
Garokk as depicted in X-Men: The Animated Series.

- Garokk appears in the X-Men: The Animated Series two-part episode "Savage Land, Strange Heart", voiced by an uncredited actor. This version was previously defeated by the High Evolutionary and imprisoned in the Earth.
- Garokk appears in X-Men Legends II: Rise of Apocalypse, voiced by Dwight Schultz.
