= List of Marvel Comics characters: Z =

== Zadkiel ==
Zadkiel is a former archangel in the service of Heaven and an enemy of the Ghost Rider, named after the mythical angel of the same name. Created by Jason Aaron, the character debuted in Ghost Rider (vol. 4) #27.

Zadkiel is in charge of overseeing the Spirits of Vengeance in God's army, and gradually develops a hatred of humanity as God favors the sinners over the angels. Zadkiel decides to overpower and dethrone God, something that he would need the power of Spirits of Vengeance to do. It was revealed that he had endowed Johnny Blaze with the powers of Ghost Rider. Zadkiel battles Blaze and Blaze's brother, Danny Ketch, but is defeated and imprisoned in Hell.

Other versions

During the 2015 "Secret Wars" story line, a variation of Zadkiel resides in the Battleworld domain of Doomstadt and works for Arcade as the Killiseum's chief of security.

== Zaladane ==
Zaladane is a character appearing in American comic books published by Marvel Comics. The character first appeared in Astonishing Tales #3 (1970), and was created by Gerry Conway and Barry Windsor-Smith.

Zaladane is the high priestess and queen of the Sun People, who live in the Savage Land. She attempts to lead the Sun People in a war to conquer the peoples of the Savage Land, but is stopped by Garokk. Zaladane attempts to force Garokk to do her bidding, but is attacked by him. She is defeated by Ka-Zar and seemingly destroyed.

Zaladane later returns and claims to be the sibling of Polaris, who she exploits to take over the Savage Land. She captures Magneto, Shanna, and Nereel, and attempts to steal Magneto's powers as well. After a series of attacks, Zaladane is captured and executed by Magneto.

Zaladane is a sorceress with an extensive knowledge of sorcery, and the ability to wield and manipulate the forces of magic for an undefined variety of effects. She primarily has used these powers for mind control and limited energy projection. For a time she wielded the ability to control magnetic forces in a manner similar to Magneto, but of a more limited nature.

=== Zaladane in other media ===
- Zaladane appears in the X-Men: The Animated Series episode "Savage Land, Strange Heart".
- A Danger Room construct of Zaladane appears in X-Men (1993).

== Zaniac ==
Zaniac is an enemy of Thor, first appearing in Thor #319 (1982). Brad Wolfe is an actor playing the character Zaniac when he is possessed by entities who had originally been summoned by Dormammu in the 19th century to possess individuals who would then murder women as Jack the Ripper. Wolfe is possessed by the entities, becomes a serial killer, and is later irradiated by residual energy from Manhattan Project experiments, giving him superhuman strength and the ability to project energy blades.

Thug Thatcher becomes the second Zaniac after he breaks Wolfe out from prison. Wolfe attempts to betray Thatcher and is killed, causing the entities to leave Wolfe's body and possess Thatcher. Thatcher kills Thor's ex-girlfriend Jane Foster, so Thor goes back in time with Justice Peace to kill the entities before they can possess Thatcher.

== Princess Zanda ==
Princess Zanda is a character in the Marvel Universe. The character, created by Jack Kirby, first appeared in Black Panther #1 (January 1977). She was the ruler of the African nation of Narobia and a potential love interest of T'Challa/Black Panther.

=== Princess Zanda in other media ===
Princess Zanda appears in Avengers Assemble, voiced by Mela Lee. This version is a member of the Shadow Council who possesses shapeshifting abilities.

== Zarek ==
Zarek is a supervillain associated with Mar-Vell and the Kree, first appearing in Marvel Super-Heroes #12 (1967). He is the second in command of the Kree Empire while serving as Prime Minister. Working with Ronan the Accuser, he attempts to seize power from the Supreme Intelligence by presenting blue Kree like himself as heroes and pink Kree as villains to trigger ethnic conflict. Zarek is eventually caught by the Supreme Intelligence and exiled.

Zarek founds a blue Kree supremacist movement, the Lunatic Legion, with the intention of destroying Mar-Vell and the other pink Kree, but he is defeated.

== Zealot ==
Zealot is a character appearing in American comic books published by Marvel Comics.

Thomas Moreau is Philip Moreau's brother and one of the two sons of David Moreau who possesses terrakinesis. He opposed Magneto when he proclaimed as Genosha's ruler. Convening a large following, he creates a resistance force against Magneto. Magneto confronts Moreau and kills him by imprisoning him in a metallic cocoon and sending him into space.

=== Zealot in other media ===
Zealot appears as a boss in X-Men Legends II: Rise of Apocalypse, voiced by Armin Shimerman.

== Zeitgeist ==
Zeitgeist is the name of several characters appearing in American comic books published by Marvel Comics.

== Zemu ==
Zemu is an enemy of the Fantastic Four, first appearing in Strange Tales #103 (1962). He is the ruler of an alternate Earth from the Fifth Dimension who attempts to conquer Earth. The Human Torch tries to stop Zemu, who takes him to the Fifth Dimension. The Human Torch works with a resistance movement to overthrow Zemu.

Zemu returns to power and conquers Attilan. The Fantastic Four arrived to help fight Zemu after he attempts to kidnap Medusa. Zemu flees to the Fifth Dimension, but the Human Torch follows him and manages to overthrow him.

== Zenpool ==
Zenpool is the name of several characters appearing in American comic books published by Marvel Comics.

=== Wade Wilson ===
During the "AXIS" storyline, Deadpool is among the characters affected by Scarlet Witch's morality-inverting spell, transforming him into a pacifist named Zenpool.

=== Eleanor Camacho ===
In the Marvel 2099 reality of Earth-16356, the 2099 version of Eleanor Camacho is the daughter of Deadpool who operated as the 2099 version of Zenpool. She possesses a version of Deadpool's healing factor that enables her to revive after being killed with her memories intact.

=== Zenpool in other media ===
Zenpool appears in Deadpool & Wolverine, portrayed by Kevin Fortin. This version is an alternate universe version of Deadpool and a member of the Deadpool Corps.

== Zero ==
Zero is the name of several characters appearing in American comic books published by Marvel Comics.

=== Kenji Uedo ===
Kenji Uedo was created by Matt Fraction and Kieron Gillen. He is one of the "Five Lights"—a group of mutants who manifested their abilities after the events of "Second Coming". Following his introduction, Zero, along with Hope Summers, Velocidad, Transonic, Oya, and Primal, is featured in the series Generation Hope. He is the last of the Lights to join Hope's team, as the first storyline of Generation Hope involves the team getting his powers under control.

Kenji Uedo is a successful nineteen-year-old artist from Tokyo, Japan, when his powers first appear. Though originally Kenji just seems to be a messy introvert with hygiene issues, his powers quickly manifest into uncontrollable organic tendrils, which kill his assistant and start to wreak havoc in Tokyo. Soon afterward, Cyclops, Wolverine, Rogue, Hope, and the other Lights arrive in Japan to find Kenji destroying the city. After Hope subdues him, Kenji is remorseful, admitting that he has fantasies of killing people, and he wants the X-Men's help to ensure that he never goes on a rampage again. After Emma Frost probes his mind, she convinces Cyclops that Kenji truly is remorseful, and Cyclops agrees to help Kenji.

After Hope decides that each of the Lights needs their own codename, Kenji begins to consider his several options. At first, he suggests Derivative or Rei (Japanese for "zero") before settling on simply Zero.

The "Schism" storyline concludes with the separation of the X-Men into two different teams (one led by Cyclops and the other by Wolverine). Velocidad, Transonic, Primal, and Zero choose to stay on Utopia with Hope, while Oya leaves with Wolverine for the rebuilt X-Mansion, now named the Jean Grey School for Higher Learning.

When the Lights are attacked by a group of Utopia residents jealous of the young team's status with the X-Men, Hope usurps Zero's control over his powers to force an end to the conflict. This incident galvanizes Zero's distrust of Hope, who he believes means to subjugate all mutants with her immense power. Using implants he had placed into the brains of a number of Utopia inhabitants, he manipulates a large group of mutants into clamoring for Hope's death. During the ensuing battle, Martha Johansson disrupts Zero's powers, killing him and freeing the affected mutants from his influence.

While traveling the globe, Storm discovers that Kenji has survived, but lost all memories of his time with the X-Men. Kenji attacks Storm, but she manages to convince him to stand down. Kenji vanishes, telling Storm that he would see her again.

Zero resurfaces during the Krakoan Age, where he joins the Dark X-Men.

=== ADAM Unit Zero ===
Zero was created in the late 39th century by the Askani as a prototype for the Ambient-energy Dampening Automated peacekeeping Mechanisms (ADAMs). After being damaged, Zero is found by the mutant Stryfe, who manipulates it into serving him.

After Deadpool convinces him to stop working for Stryfe, Zero joins Tyler Dayspring for a short while, helping him in finding out the true relationship between Cable and Stryfe. Seeking to achieve sentience and true life, Zero leaves Tyler and encounters the techno-organic being Douglock, granting him independence from the Phalanx. Zero sacrifices itself to protect Excalibur, Douglock, and a family of innocents from the destruction of Stryfe's base, but transfers his memories to Douglock before being destroyed.

== Zero/One ==
Zero/One is a character appearing in American comic books published by Marvel Comics.

Parul Kurinji is a scientist who infected herself with a technological virus created by MODOK with the intent to stop it from spreading further. However, Red Hulk interrupts the process, leaving Kurinji in a half-mechanical state. Recognizing herself as neither fully human nor mechanical, Kurinji dubs herself Zero/One, derived from binary code.

== Zhered-Na ==
Zhered-Na is an ancient sorceress in Marvel Comics, first appearing in Fear #15 (1973). Born in Atlantis prior to its sinking, she worshiped the god Valka and trained in sorcery under Agamotto. Zhered-Na was banished from Atlantis around 18000 BC after predicting it would sink into the ocean, and she founded her own religious cult where she fought the Dweller-in-Darkness. She assisted Daimon Hellstrom when he went back in time to fight the magic serpent Kometes.

Zhered-Na was killed when her cult was attacked by villagers, controlled by the Dweller-in-Darkness and his creation D'Spayre, causing Agamotto to forsake Earth.

== Abraham Zimmer ==
Abraham Zimmer is a supporting character of the superhero Iron Man. Zimmer first appeared in Iron Man #219 (1987). He was a computer technician whose company failed after it was sabotaged by the supervillain Ghost. He later began working at Stark Enterprises, the company owned by Iron Man's alter ego Tony Stark, where he began assisting Iron Man after helping Stark identify Ghost. Zimmer helped track the stolen Iron Man armors during the Armor Wars and assisted with various technological developments that Iron Man used to fight supervillains. Zimmer also sought out technology to heal Stark's spine following paralysis and helped put him in cryostasis when he was infected with a deadly parasite.

Zimmer joined the Stark Enterprises Board of Directors following Stark's apparent death. Zimmer attempted to covertly remove the Iron Man armors from the premises when the company was being bought out by Fukikawa International, but he was killed in a fight with Calico and Brass.

== Zoe Zimmer ==
Zoe Zimmer is a character appearing in American comic books published by Marvel Comics.

Zoe Zimmer is the most popular girl at Coles Academic High School. She is a former school bully of Kamala Khan who later befriended her and developed a romantic interest in Nakia Bahadir.

=== Zoe Zimmer in other media ===
Zoe Zimmer appears in Ms. Marvel (2022), portrayed by Laurel Marsden.

== Zirksu ==
Zirksu is a character appearing in comic books related to Marvel Comics. The character, created by Roy Thomas and Jim Craig, first appeared in Marvel Premiere #35 (January 1977). He is a Skrull who assumed the alias Diabolik while being an enemy of 3-D Man.

=== Zirksu in other media ===
Zirksu appears in Secret Invasion, portrayed by Mark Lewis. This version is a member of the Skrull Resistance who posed as an unidentified man.

== Zodiac ==
Zodiac is an alias used by several characters appearing in American comic books published by Marvel Comics. The first incarnation, the One-Man Zodiac (Darren Bentley), was created by writer Roy Thomas and artist Sal Buscema, and debuted in Avengers vol. 1 #72 (November 1969). The second incarnation, Mister Zodiac (Astro), was created by George S. Elrick and debuted in the story Spider-Man Zaps Mr. Zodiac (1976). The third incarnation, Zodiak (Norman Harrison), was created by writer Howard Mackie and artist Javier Saltares, and debuted in Ghost Rider vol. 3 #10 (December 1990). The fourth incarnation of Zodiac was created by writer Joe Casey and artist Nathan Fox, and debuted in Dark Reign: Zodiac #1 (June 2009).

== Zom ==
Zom is a character, a gigantic semi-humanoid demon who has clashed with Doctor Strange. Created by Stan Lee and Marie Severin, he first appeared in Strange Tales #156.

Zom is a powerful mystical entity who Dormammu and Eternity previously imprisoned in an amphora. In the present day, Doctor Strange battles Dormammu's sister Umar and frees Zom to assist him. He succeeds in getting Umar to retreat, but is overwhelmed when Zom attacks him. The Ancient One instructs Strange to cut off Zom's hair, which summons the Living Tribunal to defeat Zom.

In the "World War Hulk" storyline, Strange harnesses Zom's power in an unsuccessful attempt to battle the Hulk.

== Weaponless Zsen ==
Weaponless Zsen is a character appearing in American comic books published by Marvel Comics, created by Simon Spurrier and Jan Bazaldua. She is an Arakkii mutant with the power to "paint the truth", an ability she considers useless as it has no application in combat.

Zsen is the daughter of the Fisher King and Zsora of the Spirit Flame. After her parents are captured following a failed attack on the Great Ring of Arakko, Zsen and her sister Khora are made to witness Zsora's execution. Disgusted by her father's perceived cowardice, Zsen allows Tarn the Uncaring to alter her to compensate for her non-offensive power, giving her retractable blades in her arms. She later joins the Inward Watch under the command of Ora Serrata.

== Zsora of the Spirit Flame ==
Zsora of the Spirit Flame is a character appearing in American comic books published by Marvel Comics, created by Al Ewing and Yıldıray Çınar. She is an Arakkii mutant with burning eyes that can see the truth. Imprisoned by Tarn the Uncaring at a young age with her sister Syzya because of their powers, she meets the Fisher King after stopping him from assassinating Tarn. They fall in love, marry, and have two daughters, Khora and Zsen. Zsora, her husband, and her sister secretly reform the Night Table of the Great Ring of Arakko and work to overthrow Annihilation's rule of Arakko. During an attack on the Great Ring, Zsora is captured and executed by Famine.

== Zula ==
Zula is a character first appearing in Conan the Barbarian, and an original creation of Marvel Comics writer Roy Thomas, rather than the classic Conan the Barbarian novel authors: Robert E. Howard, L. Sprague de Camp, or Lin Carter. Zula is a mighty black warrior/swordsman and a very skilled sorcerer. He is from south Darfar, the son of the chieftain, and the last survivor of his massacred "Zamballah tribe". Zula is clothed in a "Vendyhan" (Indian) tiger skin, and dons a mohawk-like "war crest". He is a loyal comrade of Conan the Barbarian; and Conan's long time lady companion, Bêlit, pirate Queen of the Black Coast; as well as Red Sonja. Although allies, Conan and Zula have also been known to bitterly battle, from time to time.

=== In other media ===
- A female version of Zula appears in Conan the Destroyer (1984), portrayed by Grace Jones.
- Zula appears in Conan the Adventurer (1992).

== Zuri ==
Zuri is a character appearing in American comic books published by Marvel Comics. The character was created by Christopher Priest and Mark Texeira, and first appeared in Black Panther (vol. 3) #1 (November 1998). He is an elderly Wakandan warrior who fought alongside T'Chaka and is implied to have trained T'Challa. Zuri is later killed by Morlun.

Zuri has superhuman strength, and is also an expert hunter, skilled tracker, and a master at armed and hand-to-hand combat.

=== Zuri in other media ===
Zuri appears in Black Panther (2018), portrayed by Forest Whitaker as an adult, and by Denzel Whitaker as a young adult. As a young man, Zuri posed as an American named James to tail N'Jobu, T'Chaka's brother and a traitor, and witnesses the latter's death at T'Chaka's hands. Twenty-five years later, Zuri appoints T'Challa as the king, and oversees the latter's fight with M'Baku by administering a liquid to temporarily negate abilities. Killmonger later kills Zuri when he attempts to protect T'Challa.

== ZZZXX ==
ZZZXX, also known as ZZXZ, is a symbiote appearing in American comic books published by Marvel Comics. The character, created by Christopher Yost and Dustin Weaver, first appeared in X-Men: Kingbreaker #2 (March 2009). ZZZXX is a mutant symbiote which feeds on a host's brains. It was discovered years prior by the Shi'ar, and experimented upon and tamed by Emperor D'Ken. Classified as a dangerous criminal of the Shi'ar empire, ZZZXX serves in Vulcan's Imperial Guard while having bonded to an unnamed soldier to fight with the Starjammers.

== Works cited ==
- Official Handbook of the Marvel Universe A to Z. Vol. 13. Marvel Comics. 2010. ISBN 9780785141785.
- Official Handbook of the Marvel Universe A to Z. Vol. 14. Marvel Comics. 2010. ISBN 9780785141792.
