= X-Men Legends II: Rise of Apocalypse =

2005 video game

- Developer: Raven Software (Note: Beenox developed the Windows port. Vicarious Visions developed the PSP port. Barking Lizards Technologies developed the N-Gage port. Mforma developed the Mobile port.)
- Publisher: Activision
- Director: Dan Vondrak
- Producer: Matthew Paul
- Designer: Keith Fuller
- Programmers: Daniel Edwards; Gil Gribb
- Artist: Dan Hay
- Writer: Robert Love
- Composer: Gregor Narholz
- Engine: Vicarious Visions Alchemy
- Platforms: GameCube; PlayStation 2; Windows; Xbox; PlayStation Portable; N-Gage; Mobile phone
- Release: September 20, 2005: GameCube, PlayStation 2, Windows, & Xbox; NA: September 20, 2005; AU: October 12, 2005; EU: October 14, 2005 PlayStation Portable; NA: October 19, 2005; AU: November 23, 2005; EU: November 25, 2005 N-Gage; EU: October 28, 2005; NA: October 31, 2005 Mobile December 19, 2005
- Genre: Action role-playing
- Modes: Single-player, multiplayer

X-Men Legends II: Rise of Apocalypse is an action role-playing game developed by Raven Software and published by Activision. It is the follow-up to 2004's X-Men Legends. It was released in September 2005 for the GameCube, Windows, PlayStation 2, and Xbox. Later, the game was ported to PlayStation Portable, N-Gage, and mobile. It is set after the events of X-Men Legends and features the mutant supervillain Apocalypse as the primary antagonist.

The developers intended the game to have a greater sense of scale than its predecessor, with a story where the villains known as the Brotherhood of Mutants would need to ally themselves with the X-Men to defeat a greater threat. Blur Studio created the cinematics. Online multiplayer was also added. Multiplayer on Xbox Live was available to players until April 15, 2010. X-Men Legends II is now playable online again on the replacement Xbox Live servers called Insignia.

The game was well received by gaming critics on all platforms. They felt that the inclusion of online play, additional mutant powers, and a larger cast made the game an improvement over its predecessor. Some reviewers were critical of the game's voice acting and felt that the gameplay was repetitive. It sold enough copies to be added to the budget line known as PlayStation 2's Greatest Hits.

== Gameplay ==
Gameplay from X-Men Legends II. Here the heroes battle Sugar Man

X-Men Legends II is an action role-playing game. It unites two Marvel Comics superhero teams, the heroic X-Men and the villainous Brotherhood of Mutants as they together face the mutant supervillain Apocalypse and his minions. Players can choose up to four characters to use at once from a larger roster. Players unlock additional characters as they proceed through the game. Four players can play on one machine cooperatively, and players can join or leave at any time. The game also features online play for up to four players, a first for the series. A new game plus mode is included that allows players to play through the game a second time while retaining all character stats.

As characters gain experience points, their mutant superpowers and unique abilities can be upgraded. Items found during gameplay can also be equipped to further enhance a character's abilities. Characters can combine attacks to create a combo, in which two or more players punch or kick a single enemy at the same time. The character's special abilities can also be used in the same manner to create a Super Combo which inflicts massive damage on enemies. Each character has several mutant powers that players can assign to controller buttons. The game also features a skirmish mode, which allows players to fight against each other or waves of computer-controlled enemies.

X-Men Legends II: Rise of Apocalypse features a central hub that players return to between missions. It is a designated area free from enemies, and its setting changes to coincide with the current act of the game. Here players can view loading screen art, cinematics, and comic book covers acquired during gameplay. Biographies of the X-Men and their enemies can be accessed here. Players can also participate in an X-Men trivia game which awards experience points for correct answers. Additionally, players can access a virtual combat environment known as the Danger Room to play additional missions unlocked during gameplay.

The mobile phone version of the game is primarily a beat 'em up with role-playing elements. Unlike the console versions, the game plays as a side-scroller in the same vein as the 1992 X-Men arcade game. There are five selectable characters, and players upgrade each through experience points earned. Players control one character at a time, and can switch to another at the press of a button.

== Synopsis ==
=== Setting ===
X-Men Legends II: Rise of Apocalypse takes place some time after the events of X-Men Legends. The mutant supervillain Apocalypse, having witnessed the X-Men's defeat of Magneto remotely, declares that the Age of Apocalypse is nigh. Prior to the game's campaign, he kidnaps Professor X and Polaris for unknown purposes. Locations include a military prison in Greenland, the mutant sanctuary of Genosha, the Savage Land, and Egypt.

=== Plot ===
The game begins with members of the X-Men (Cyclops, Storm, and Wolverine) meeting up with members of the Brotherhood (Magneto, Mystique, and Sabretooth) at a military prison outpost in Greenland to free Professor X, who was captured alongside Polaris. Magneto reveals that his son, Quicksilver, was also captured by Apocalypse.

Upon freeing Xavier, the teams relocate to the mutant haven of Genosha. They find that the island was ravaged by Apocalypse's forces during an intense battle with Magneto's airships. The teams set out to free the island from Apocalypse's control. They briefly encounter Mister Sinister, who was experimenting on Genoshan mutants, and fight Grizzly, Lady Deathstrike, and Zealot as they free captive citizens and collect information. To free the island completely, they defeat Abyss, the first of Apocalypse's Horsemen. Assuming that the need for cooperation has ended, the teams decide to go their separate ways. However, Apocalypse kidnaps Beast from the X-Mansion and destroys it.

Beast manages to point the team in the direction of the Savage Land, a prehistoric preserve in Antarctica. The teams work their way through the Savage Land, defeating Garokk, Sauron, and Omega Red, as well as the second Horseman, Mikhail Rasputin. They learn that Apocalypse has gained information from the ancient alien technology to use toward a machine of unknown power.

Apocalypse sets his plans in motion by conquering New York City. The teams work to sabotage Apocalypse's resources by destroying his army's cloning facility and disabling his main power plant while defeating Sugar Man. However, Emma Frost is captured before the teams battle the Stepford Cuckoos and the third Horseman, Holocaust. Angel is captured shortly after and is transformed into Archangel, the final Horseman of Apocalypse.

With Apocalypse's army weakened, the teams begin liberating New York City. They help Nick Fury regain control of the Sentinels from Bastion. Within the city, they defeat Apocalypse's armies, along with Stryfe and a mind-controlled Deadpool. The teams defeat Archangel at Apocalypse's tower, where they find Beast, now under the control of Mister Sinister; he kidnaps Sabretooth and escapes with Apocalypse and Mister Sinister to Egypt.

They learn that Apocalypse's plan is to use Polaris, Quicksilver, Frost, and Sabretooth as part of a machine to fuel an experiment to grant him massive amounts of power. The teams then follow Apocalypse to Egypt where they defeat Mister Sinister while freeing Beast from Sinister's control. After besting the final guard, the Living Monolith, the teams battle Apocalypse and defeat him by stealing the powers from his machine.

In the final cutscene, Magneto and Professor X part once again as adversaries, noting that Apocalypse was defeated but not destroyed. Beast ponders why the machine did not work properly, wondering if sabotage was a factor. As the X-Jet flies away, Sinister is seen on top of the pyramid, laughing, hinting that he sabotaged the machine.

=== Playable characters ===
X-Men Legends II features 18 playable characters, limited to only six in the mobile version. Several playable characters return from X-Men Legends, and select members of the Brotherhood of Mutants are also playable. Some non-playable X-Men and Brotherhood characters appear during levels. In some instances dialogue throughout the game can be character-to-character specific, depending on the player character's alignment and relationship with the non-player character. The Windows version features two additional playable characters, while the PlayStation Portable features four exclusive characters.

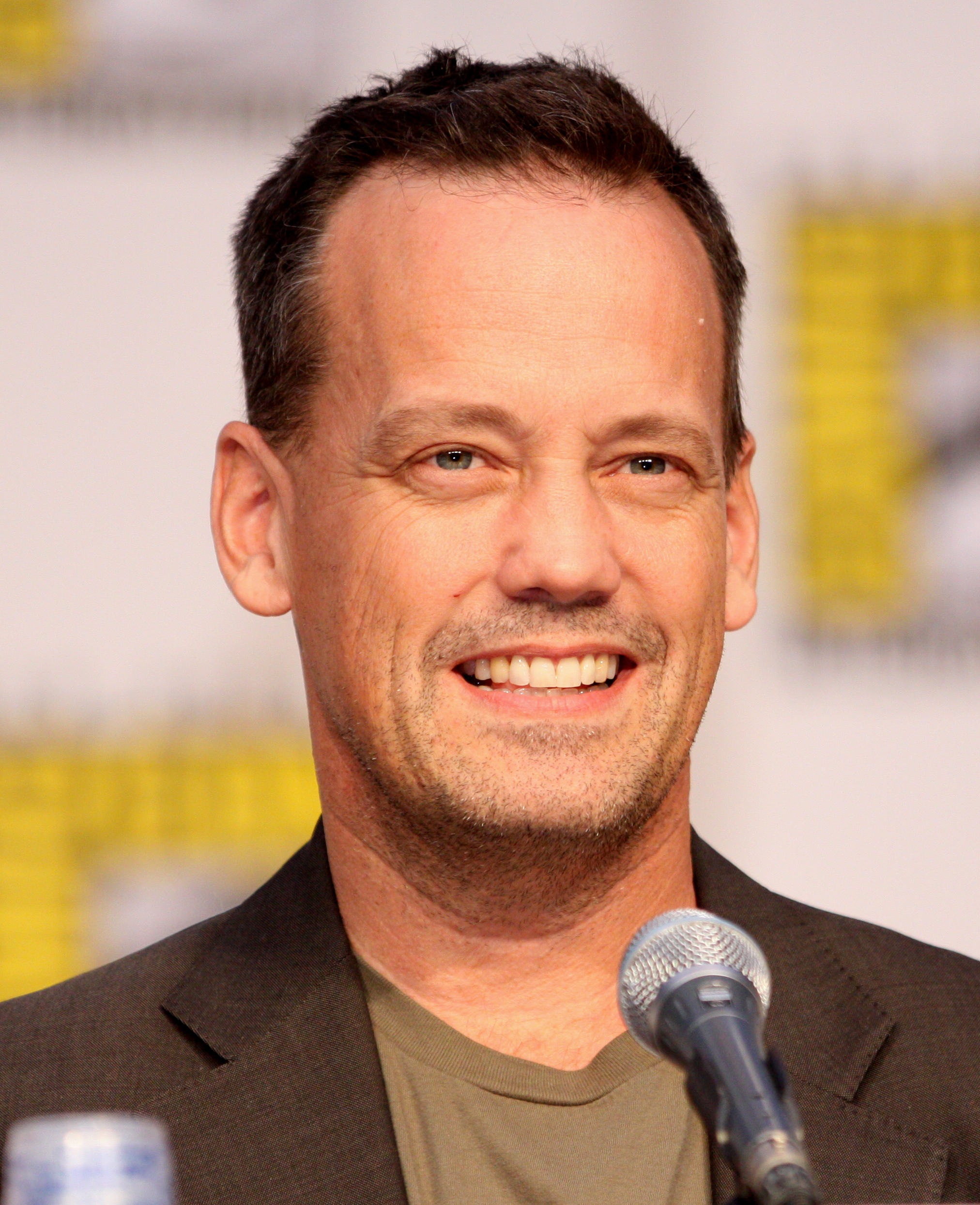
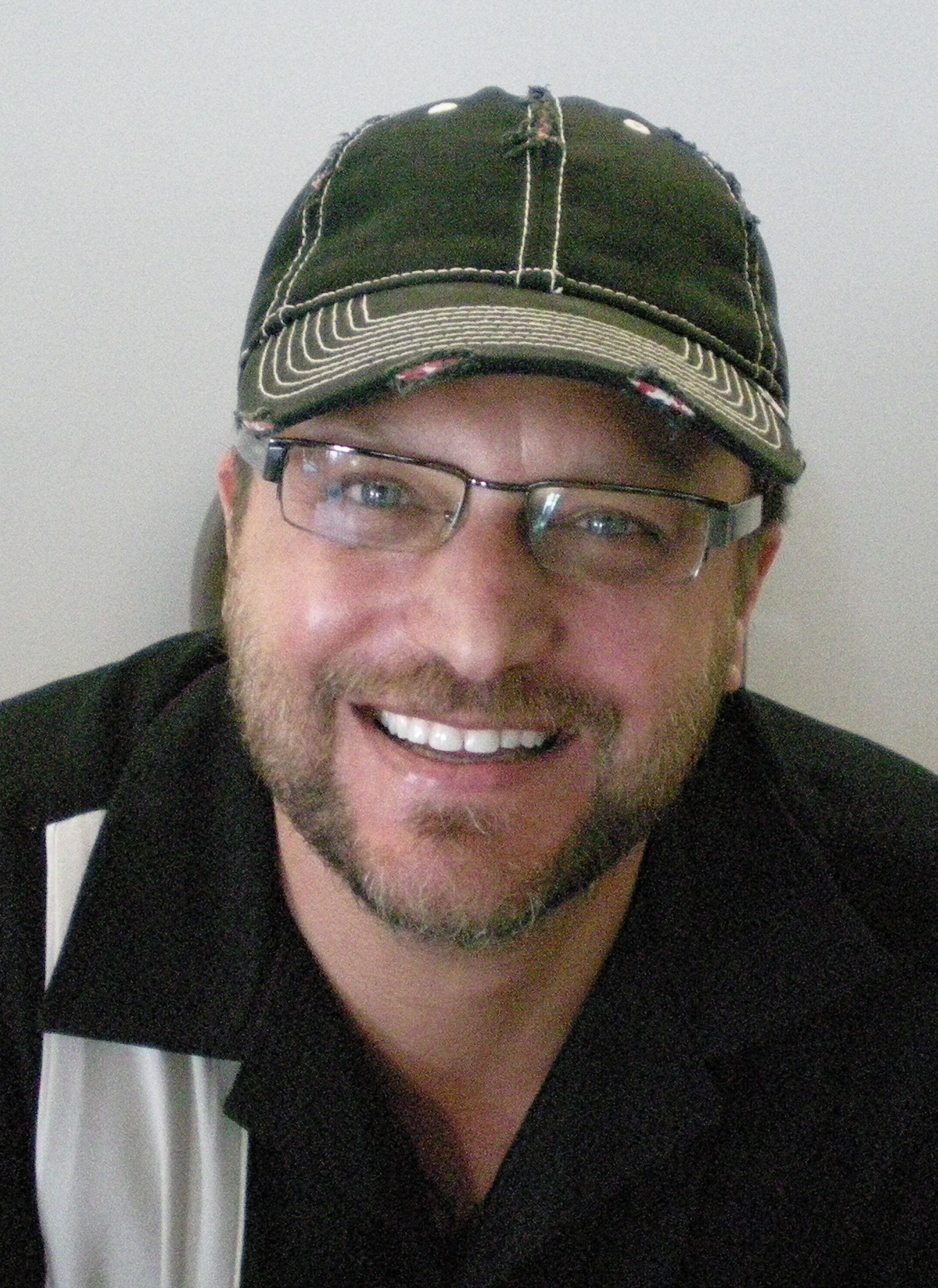
X-Men Legends II features voice acting from veteran voice talent, including Dee Bradley Baker, who voices Nightcrawler (top), and Steve Blum, who voices Wolverine.
- Beast (Note: Exclusive to mobile version.)
- Bishop
- Cable (Note: Exclusive to PSP version)
- Cannonball
- Colossus
- Cyclops (Note: Playable in the mobile version of the game.)
- Dark Phoenix
- Deadpool
- Gambit
- Iceman
- Iron Man
- Jean Grey
- Juggernaut
- Magneto
- Nightcrawler
- Professor X
- Pyro (Note: Exclusive to Windows version)
- Rogue
- Sabretooth
- Scarlet Witch
- Storm
- Sunfire
- Toad
- Wolverine
- X-Man

== Development and marketing ==
X-Men Legends II: Rise of Apocalypse was announced on October 21, 2004, exactly one month after the release of X-Men Legends. It was shown at Electronic Entertainment Expo (E3) and San Diego Comic-Con in 2005. It was first released for the GameCube, PlayStation 2, Xbox and Windows in North America on September 20, 2005, Australia on October 12, 2005, and in Europe on October 14, 2005. The PlayStation Portable version was released approximately one month later in North America on October 19, Australia on November 23, and in Europe on November 25. Developed by Barking Lizards Technologies, a distinct version of the game was released on the first-generation N-Gage handheld platform in Europe on October 28, and in North America on October 31. A mobile phone version developed by Mforma was launched on December 19. A playable demo was released for the Windows version of the game on November 3.

Developer Raven Software sought to expand on the preceding game's scale. As such, characters were given additional powers to choose from. Locations were also made more diverse. "With the environments we tried to create [something] more exotic and organic" stated Dan Vondrak, Project Lead on X-Men Legends II. Locations span from the mutant haven of Genosha, to the Savage Land, to ancient temples in Egypt. Raven Software collaborated directly with Marvel to write the game's story. Man of Action, a group of former Marvel writers who were responsible for the previous game's story, were not involved. The music was composed by Gregor Narholz. Gameplay and story aspects were adjusted to ensure that four players can play continuously, whereas in the previous game certain missions were limited to one player. The CGI cinematics were created by Blur Studio, who would go on to create cinematics for games such as Marvel: Ultimate Alliance and Star Wars: The Force Unleashed II.

Vicarious Visions's engine powers Rise of Apocalypse and its predecessor. They were also responsible for the PlayStation Portable version of the game. Karthik Bala, CEO of Vicarious Visions felt strongly that the PSP version should have the same gameplay as the consoles: "One of our main goals [...] was to really bring the depth and detail of the console game over to portable form on the PSP". Four new exclusive characters were added to the PSP version along with nine new side missions. The control system had to be modified to accommodate the PSP's fewer buttons. Online play is available on the PSP, both in ad-hoc and infrastructure modes. Bala stated that it was a priority for his team. SuperVillain Studios was brought on to the project to focus on the online component of the game. Beenox ported X-Men Legends II to Windows.

== Reception ==
Reception

Aggregate scores
Aggregator	Score
GameRankings	(Xbox) 82.62% (PSP) 82.57% (PC) 81.40% (GC) 80.83% (PS2) 80.71%
Metacritic	(Xbox) 84/100 (PSP) 82/100 (GC) 82/100 (PS2) 82/100 (PC) 80/100

Review scores
Publication	Score
1Up.com	A (PC) B+
GameSpy	(Xbox & PS2) 4.5/5; 4/5
IGN	8.5/10 (PSP) 8.4/10 (GC) 8/10

X-Men Legends II: Rise of Apocalypse received generally favorable reviews. All platforms hold aggregate scores in the 80–85% range at aggregate review websites GameRankings and Metacritic. Reported scores at Metacritic ranged from 59% to 100% approval. According to the NPD Group, Rise of Apocalypse sold over 63,000 units on the Xbox during the month of its release. It sold enough copies to be added to the budget line known as PlayStation 2's Greatest Hits. PALGN's Jeremy Jastrzab felt that Rise of Apocalypse "caters for X-Men fans and if you can gather three others, you're going to have a great time". Tom Byron of 1UP.com praised several aspects of the game, and felt that amidst The Incredible Hulk: Ultimate Destruction, Ultimate Spider-Man and Fantastic Four game releases in 2005 X-Men Legends II was the best release from Marvel that year.

Commentary on gameplay was generally positive. G4TV's reviewer lauded the destructible environments, but felt that the gameplay lacked variation. The reviewer from VideoGamer.com noted that the co-operative gameplay was strong, and that the addition of online play "opens the [gameplay] up to a wider range of people". PALGN's Jeremy Jastrzab felt that the game's menus were convoluted and difficult to navigate, and also felt that the game began to drag near the end of the story. The inclusion of additional mutant powers and online gameplay were points of praise. GameSpot's Greg Mueller praised the game's vast cast of characters, destructible environments and unlockable content, but felt that the user interface was awkward. Mueller also felt that the game loaded content far too frequently. GamesRadar's Raymond Padilla had similar complaints about the frequency and length of the game's load times. Padilla praised the addition of online play and the automatic upgrade system.

Reviewers have high marks on the game's cast of characters, but were divided in their opinions of the choice of voice actors. GameTrailers's reviewer disliked that several famous X-Men and Brotherhood characters were not playable, but appeared only as side characters. They also cited issues with voice acting and a convoluted story. Unlike the critic from GameTrailers, G4's reviewer praised the overall story, and further praised the selection of characters for the cast. Greg Mueller of GameSpot also praised the game's vast cast of characters.

Critics were split on their assessment of the game's visuals. The reviewer from GameTrailers noted that the game's visuals had improved greatly, citing the effects, environments and cinematics as some of the largest upgrades. Inversely GamesRadar's Raymond Padilla felt that the game's graphics felt dated. Steve Steinberg of GameSpy conceded that while the visuals were generally improved over the game's predecessor, it still lacked in quality and variation. Steinberg stated that the characters now felt like "a part of the environments, as opposed to cut-outs floating on top of it". He noted that even with the improvements the players may lose their character amidst the environment, causing confusion.

The success of the X-Men Legends series led Raven Software, Marvel, and Activision to create the video game Marvel: Ultimate Alliance, which was released on several consoles, handheld devices and Microsoft Windows in 2006. Barking Lizards, Vicarious Visions and Beenox handled the ports for different platforms. Marvel: Ultimate Alliance was followed by Marvel: Ultimate Alliance 2, jointly developed by Vicarious Visions, n-Space and Savage Entertainment. Marvel Ultimate Alliance 2 was released on several consoles and handhelds in the fall of 2009. Vicarious Visions developed the PS3 and Xbox 360 versions, while n-Space developed the Nintendo DS, PSP PS2 and Wii versions. Savage Entertainment ported the version developed by n-Space to the PSP.
