= Savage Land =

Fictional place on Marvel Comics

- Location of the Savage Land in Antarctica.
- First appearance: The X-Men #10 (March 1965); Marvel Mystery Comics #22 (August 1941, retroactive)
- Created by: Stan Lee; Jack Kirby

In-universe information
- Type: Prehistoric Earth
- Races: Aerians; Ape-Men; Awakilius; Bhadwuans; Cat People; Cliff Forest People; Disians; Durammi; Ethereals; Fall People; Golden People; Gondorans; Gorankians; Gwundas; Hauk'ka; Hill-Forest People; Jeriens; Kantos; Karems; Klantorr; Lemurans; Lizard Men; Locot; Man-Apes; Neo-Men; N'Galans; Nhu'Ghari; Nowek; Palandorians; Pterons; Reptile Men; Rock Tribe; Saurians; Snowmen; Sun-People; Swamp Men; Sylandans; Tandar-Kaans; Tokchis; Tordon-Naans; Tree People; Tribe of Fire; Tubanti; Uruburians; Waidians; Water People; Zebra People
- Locations: Antarctica
- Characters: Ka-Zar; Shanna the She-Devil; Zabu; Sauron; Garokk; Zaladane; Savage Land Mutates; Devil Dinosaur; Moon-Boy; Chtylok; Dinah Soar
- Publisher: Marvel Comics

The Savage Land is a fictional prehistoric land that features in American comic books published by Marvel Comics. It is a tropical preserve, hidden in Antarctica. It has appeared in many story arcs in Uncanny X-Men as well as other related books.

The Savage Land has appeared in various media outside comics, including animated series and video games. It also makes a brief appearance in the 2022 Marvel Cinematic Universe film Doctor Strange in the Multiverse of Madness.

== Publication history ==
The Savage Land first appeared in X-Men #10 (March 1965), by Stan Lee and Jack Kirby.

An earlier story in Marvel Mystery Comics #22 (Aug. 1941), was retrospectively regarded as the first appearance of the Savage Land, though not intended as such upon original publication. In the story "Khor, the Black Sorcerer" by Joe Simon, Jack Kirby, and Syd Shores, was featured a fictional place called 'The Land Where Time Stands Still'.

== Fictional history ==
In the X-Men series of comics, the Savage Land was created by the alien Nuwali at the behest of the Beyonders, who sought to observe the process of evolution under relatively controlled conditions. In order to accomplish this, they had the Nuwali set up a number of game preserves on several planets. One of these planets was Earth during the Triassic period where the Nuwali chose a valley in Antarctica surrounded by active volcanoes. They proceeded to install a number of advanced technological devices in order to maintain a tropical climate. The aliens then stocked the area with all manner of Earth life over the following several millennia such as dinosaurs and prehistoric mammals. They also brought over the Man-Apes, earlier hominid ancestors of Homo sapiens.

The Beyonders eventually grew bored with the experiment, and the Nuwali stopped maintaining the Savage Land during the Late Pleistocene era (the Ice Age era). However, the self-maintaining technology that allowed the pocket of tropical climate was left running, and many species which became extinct in other areas of Earth continued to thrive within the Savage Land.

Later on, a group of human survivors from Atlantis sailed to Antarctica before the "Great Cataclysm" which sank Atlantis into the ocean. There, they discovered a cavern where they found an immense climate-controlling device and harnessed the technology used to keep the Savage Land's volcanoes working. They named their location "Pangea", which is Atlantean for "paradise".

They mastered genetic engineering, which had been used on the Man-Apes when the Nuwali were still maintaining the Savage Land area. They used their genetic engineering techniques to transform other Savage Land inhabitants like the Golden People, the Lizard Men, the Reptile Men, the Tubantis, and others. The Atlanteans then forced them to work for them until these animal people revolted. After a time of war, the animal people demanded civil rights and the Atlanteans used technology to expand the Savage Land's surface area for the animal people to live in. When the Great Cataclysm struck, the Atlantean empire fell and thanks to the machines, the Savage Land locations were spared from sinking into the sea.

The Savage Land was rediscovered by English explorer Robert Plunder, who took back a sample of vibranium with him. This mysterious metal had the ability to produce vibrations which would liquefy all other metals. Fleeing from those who sought to steal this discovery, Plunder took his eldest son Kevin with him for a second trip into the Savage Land. The elder Plunder was killed by Man-Apes.

Kevin survived, thanks to the timely intervention of the orphaned Smilodon Zabu. He grew to adulthood in the Savage Land, becoming Ka-Zar. Ka-Zar had many team-ups with the X-Men, who first revealed the Savage Land's existence, Spider-Man, and many other superheroes who had visited the Savage Land. He later met and married Shanna the She-Devil.

The Savage Land's existence is common knowledge throughout the world. The United Nations considers the Savage Land an international wildlife preserve and forbids any commercial exploitation of its resources. Areas of the Savage Land are tame enough that the X-Men visit for recreation, including having a vacation home there.

== Savage Land races ==
=== Human tribes ===
- Awakilius – The Awakilius are a tribe of pygmies that live in the Savage Land and are descended from African immigrants.
- Bhadwuans – The Bhadwuans are an advanced society who are the supposed descendants of the Atlanteans. They specialize in magic, allowing them to fly and discharge energy when they act in unison.
- Cat People – The Cat People (also called Pandorians) are a tribe of hunter-gatherers who live in Pandori, Pangea and in the periphery of the Lemuran society.
- Cliff Forest People – The Cliff Forest People are a tribe of humans who live on a steep cliff in the Savage Land.
- Durammi – The Durammi are a tribe of humans who live in a peaceful valley within the Savage Land.
- Fall People – The Fall People are a hunter-gatherer tribe that live in villages, and are led by a chieftain. Their appearance and culture are similar to Native Americans.
- Gondorans – The Gondorans are a tribe of humans that inhabit Gondora, a city in a dormant volcano. It was ruled by Montgomery Ford, a rogue scientist from the outside world.
- Gwundas – The Gwundas are a race of primitive hunter-gatherers who live in the Savage Land.
- Hill-Forest People – The Hill-Forest People are a race of primitive humans that live in the Savage Land. They worshipped a capsule containing Grond of Gondwanaland until Grond woke up and was defeated by Ka-Zar.
- Lemurans – The Lemurans are a society of humans who inhabit Lemura. Their level of technology is the same as Medieval England.
- Locot – The Locots are a society of hunter-gatherers who are at war with the Noweks.
- Nowek – The Noweks are a society of hunters and gatherers who are at war with the less developed tribes.
- Palandorians – The Palandorians are a tribe of humans that live on an island surrounded by a lake in the original Savage Land. They live in the city of Palandor and ride giant lizards. Their culture likely derives form ancient Atlantis (same as the Lemurans). The Palandorians were often preyed upon by the Klantorrs. During the reign of Queen Omel, the Palandorians performed human sacrifices which ceased when a mutated Apatosaurus destroyed the temple which killed Queen Omel.
- Sun People – The Sun People control the Sun Empire, formerly ruled by Zaladane. They were the most powerful grouping of sentient beings within the Savage Land, and they established a small empire through conquest in the name of their sun god Garokk.
- Swamp Men – The Swamp Men are hairy humanoids who live in the swamplands of the Savage Land. These tribal people have a level of technology comparable to that of Europe's Dark Ages, ride giant birds, and are highly skilled in devising weaponry.
- Sylandans – The Sylandans are a society of humans that are one of the descendants of the ancient Atlanteans. They live in Sylanda, a city of glass located in the Savage Land's Mountain of Darkness. They cling to their Atlantean ways as their level of technology is high. The Sylandans use the Water of Life to cure all diseases and used it to treat the people of the Savage Land for centuries.
- Tandar-Kaans – The Tandar-Kaans are a tribe of people who live in the Savage Land. They are expert ship builders and fishermen. They formed a community of barges on the river Tabar, allowing them to move to new shores when they want to.
- Tokchis – The Tokchis are never seen and only alluded to. They are mentioned to be a human society of hunter-gatherers that use walkie-talkies. Ka-Zar formed an alliance with them to coordinate efforts to hunt.
- Tordon-Naans – The Tordon-Naans inhabit a city called Tordon-Naa in a secluded valley deep in the Savage Land behind the "curtain of gods' tears". They worship the god Ilaka-Aron and their beliefs were manipulated Sylitha who sought greater power.
- Tribe of Fire – The Tribe of Fire is a tribe of human hunter-gatherers who live in the Savage Land. They are a hunter-gatherer society. Some of the tribe members were used in an experiment conducted by an Apocalypse robot until it was destroyed by Wolverine. The cyborgs from these experiments joined the Tribe of Fire.
- Water People – The Water People are a tribe of humans that live in the Savage Land. They are a hunter-gatherer society that live close to the rivers and primarily hunt by fishing.
- Zebra People – The Zebra People are a racially integrated biracial society made of up both white and black people, who wear makeup over their body in the form of zebra-like stripes.
  - Lizard People – The Lizard People are a rogue faction of the Zebra People who wear reptilian armor.

=== Primitive hominids ===
- Ape-Men – The Ape-Men consist of all the species of upright apes that developed into man. Each group lives in its own territory and has its own level of technology. The most advanced species of Ape-Man are the most dominant human race of the Savage Land and are capable of bringing down even large dinosaurs.
- Kantos – The Kantos are a race of primitive humans who live near an underground river.
- Karems – The Karems are a race of primitive hunter-gatherers. Many of the Karem were abducted by the Nuwali and Plunderer using the Motyka Bone (a teleportation bone that was lost for centuries), but were rescued by Ka-Zar and Shanna the She-Devil.
- Man-Apes – The Man-Apes are tribal, highly primitive cave-dwelling humans that are often called Neanderthals by paleontologists. These savage hominids were the first humanoid beings native to Earth to inhabit the Savage Land.

=== Beast-Men ===
- Aerians – The Aerians are avian-type Beast-Men with large feathered wings which allow them to fly. They live in Aerie Shalan, a city located on a stone pillar high above Pangea.
- Gorankians – The Gorankians are gray-skinned, ape-like, semi-intelligent, Beast-Men with small tusks and pointed ears. The Gorankians are a hunter-gatherer society and are long-time enemies of the Uruburians.
- Jeriens – The Jeriens are Pterosaur-like Beast-Men that live in the Savage Land.
- Klantorrs – The Klantorrs are Saurian-like Beast-Men with Pterosaur-like wings who live in the forest surrounding Palandor.
- Lizard Men – The Lizard Man are a lizard-like race who were one of the Beast-Men created by the ancient Atlanteans. There are two types of Lizard Men.
  - Lizard Men of Vala Kuri – The first Lizard Men are a hunter-gatherer society of Beast-Men who reside in the city of Vala Kuri.
  - Queen Iranda's Lizard Men – The second Lizard Men are humans who were temporarily turned into Lizard Men by Queen Iranda.
- N'Galans - The N'Galans are humanoid dinosaurs with possible ties to the Lizardmen and are a hunter-gatherer society.
- Pterons – The Pterons are a race of Beast-Men who resemble humanoid Pterosaurs and reside in the caverns of Athmeth beneath Pangea.
- Reptile Men – The Reptile Men are reptilian humanoids who reside in the marshes of the Savage Land. They are a hunter-gatherer society.
- Tree People – The Tree People are Beast-Men that resemble humans with monkey-like tails. They live in Botor (a treetop village in Pangea) and are a hunter-gatherer society.
- Tubanti – The Tubantis are fish-like Beast-Men who live in Pangea's inland Gorahn Sea.
- Uruburians – The Uruburians are a race of Beast-Men with cat-like faces. They are hunter-gatherers and are long-time enemies of the Gorankians.
- Waidians – The Waidians are a race of green-skinned dinosaur-like Beast-Men who are a hunter-gatherer society and are very peaceful. When Ka-Zar was a teenager, he was trained by the Waidian sage Benazu.

=== Others ===
- Disians – The Dissians (also known as the Children of Dis) are yellow-skinned humanoids who are the descendants of the Dante's Crew. They reside in the underground city of Belasco.
- Ethereals – The Ethereals are a race of advanced humanoids who were genetically enhanced by the Nuwali thousands of years ago. They are culturally arrogant and hostile to outsiders.
- Golden People – The Golden People are the descendants of the Gortokians of Subterranea. The Golden People are longtime allies of Ka-Zar and have salvaged Atlantean technology.
- Hauk'kas – The Hauk'kas are a race of reptilians who evolved from dinosaurs. The Hauk'kas possess technology, culture, and civilization that rival humans.
- Neo-Men – The Neo-Men are a society of mutated humans that were mutated by Nuwali technology.
- Nhu'Gari – The Nhu'Gari are a race of mutated humans with winged forms. They were altered by the radioactive properties of Hidden Valley which also provides them with telepathy.
- Rock Tribe – The Rock Tribe are stone-like humanoids.
- Saurians – The Saurians (also known as "The People") were originally lizards who were exposed to the first nuclear bomb test in New Mexico. It took them a while for them to evolve and they built an underground city.
- Snowmen – The Snowmen are hunter-gatherers who live in the steppes of Pangea and resemble the Yeti.

== Other versions ==
=== Age of Apocalypse ===
In the Age of Apocalypse reality, the Savage Land houses Avalon, a secret haven for humans and mutants led by Destiny, Juggernaut, and Cypher.

=== Earth X ===
In the Earth X universe, the Savage Land is where Magneto built a sanctuary called Sentinel City.

=== House of M ===
In the House of M universe, the Savage Land is known as "Pangea". Kevin Plunder was granted political asylum in the United States for his human rights activism in Pangea.

=== Marvel 2099 ===
In the alternate future depicted in Marvel 2099, an alien attack floods much of the earth rendering the Savage Land the only habitable space. Thousands of refugees (including Miguel O'Hara and most of X-Nation and X-Men) make new homes there.

=== Ultimate Marvel ===
In the Ultimate Marvel universe, the Savage Land is a large island somewhere in the southern hemisphere. It was originally stated in Ultimate Origins to have been created by Magneto, using theories and methods developed by Professor X, as the site for genetic experiments. Magneto's goal there was to create a new human race who would be less trouble to rule than the current one. He decided to restart evolution from scratch, and control the process to his own specifications. As a result of this, at its current level of advancement it has dinosaurs, but Magneto has shown no further interest in advancing the evolution of the Savage Land. This story is later revealed as false.

In Ultimates 3, it is revealed that the dinosaurs were conjured by Scarlet Witch as a result of her reality warping abilities and not by Magneto's creation. The aboriginal inhabitants were wiped out and only a small tribe of survivors including Ka-Zar and Shanna remain.

=== Ultimate Universe ===
An alternate universe version of the Savage Land appears in the Ultimate Universe imprint. This version was devastated by Roxxon during the 1970s, causing an extinction event.

== In other media ==
=== Television ===
- The Savage Land appears in the Spider-Man (1967) episode "Neptune's Nose Cone".
- The Savage Land appears in the Spider-Man (1981) episode "The Hunter and the Hunted".
- The Savage Land appears in X-Men: The Animated Series and X-Men '97.
- The Savage Land appears in The Super Hero Squad Show episode "Brouhaha at the World's Bottom!".
- The Savage Land appears in a self-titled episode of Hulk and the Agents of S.M.A.S.H..
- The Savage Land appears in the Avengers Assemble episode "Savages".
- The Savage Land appears in the Ultimate Spider-Man episode "The Savage Spider-Man".

=== Film ===
The Savage Land makes a cameo appearance in Doctor Strange in the Multiverse of Madness (2022).

=== Video games ===
- The Savage Land appears as Wolverine's stage in X-Men: Children of the Atom.
- The Savage Land appears as the first stage of X-Men.
- The Savage Land appears as a stage in X-Men 2: Clone Wars.
- The Savage Land appears as a stage in X-Men: Next Dimension.
- The Savage land appears in X-Men Legends II: Rise of Apocalypse as the home of the Brotherhood of Mutants' field base, Avalon.
- The Savage Land appears in Marvel Super Hero Squad.
- The Savage Land appears in Marvel: Avengers Alliance.
- The Savage Land appears as a stage in Marvel Tokon: Fighting Souls, with Ka-Zar, Zabu and Sauron appearing as stage background cameos in a Savage Land stage segment located at Ka-Zar's house. It is also the main location of both Hulk (who was banished due to losing control at the end of the Kree-Skrull War), and the Brotherhood of Evil.

== See also ==
- Caprona (island)
- Skartaris
