= List of Ultimate Marvel characters =

This is a list of characters from Ultimate Marvel, a re-imagining of iconic Marvel characters launched in 2000.

== A ==
Character	First appearance	Notes	Ref.
Mojo Adams	Ultimate X-Men vol. 1 #54 (January 2005)		
Agent Crock	All-New Ultimates #7 (August 2014)		
Alex Black Knight	The Ultimates 2 vol. 1 #6 (May 2005)		
Liz Allan Firestar	Ultimate Spider-Man vol. 1 #1 (September 2000)		
Abdul Al-Rahman Colonel	The Ultimates 2 vol. 1 #7 (July 2005)		
Anaconda	Ultimate Power #1 (October 2006)		
Apocalypse	Ultimate X-Men vol. 1 #49 (July 2004)		
Amara Aquilla Magma	Ultimate Comics: X-Men #19 (November 2012)		
Arcade	Ultimate X-Men vol. 1 #55 (January 2005)		
Marlene Alraune	Ultimate Spider-Man vol. 1 #82 (September 2005)		
Atrea	Ultimate Fantastic Four #51 (February 2008)		

- Agatha Harkness
- Alpha Dog
- Arcanna (Squadron Supreme)
- Arsenal
- Aurora

== B ==
Character	First appearance	Notes	Ref.
Montana Bale	Ultimate Spider-Man vol. 1 #8 (April 2001)		
Bruce Banner Hulk	Ultimate Marvel Team-Up #2 (March 2001)		
Bucky Barnes	The Ultimates vol. 1 #1 (January 2002)		
Georges Batroc Batroc the Leaper	Ultimate Comics: Spider-Man #13 (August 2012)		
Ruth Bat-Seraph	Ultimate Comics: Armor Wars #2 (October 2009)		
Lana Baumgartner Bombshell	Ultimate Spider-Man vol. 2 #2 (September 2009)		
Lori Baumgartner Bombshell	Ultimate Spider-Man vol. 2 #2 (September 2009)		
Jean-Paul Beaubier Northstar	Ultimate X-Men vol. 1 #46 (May 2004)		
Beetle	Ultimate Spider-Man vol. 1 #124 (July 2008)		
Katie Bishop	Ultimate Comics: Spider-Man #12 (July 2012)		
Lucas Bishop	Ultimate X-Men vol. 1 #76 (November 2006)		
Bobby Blackthorne Vengeance	Ultimate Comics: Avengers 2 #4 (June 2010)		
Alison Blaire Dazzler	Ultimate X-Men vol. 1 #42 (February 2004)		
Johnny Blaze Ghost Rider	Ultimate Comics: Avengers 2 #2 (May 2010)		
Emil Blonsky Abomination	Ultimate Comics: The Ultimates #27 (July 2013)		
Odin Borson	Ultimate Comics: Thor #1 (October 2010)		
Tandy Bowen Dagger	Ultimate Comics: Spider-Man #23 (May 2013)		
Betsy Braddock Psylocke	Ultimate X-Men vol. 1 #83 (June 2007)		
Brian Braddock Captain Britain	Ultimate X-Men vol. 1 #19 (October 2002)		
Jamie Braddock Captain Britain	Ultimate Comics: The Ultimates #1 (August 2011)		
Abigail Brand	Ultimate Comics: The Ultimates #20 (January 2013)		
Betty Brant	Ultimate Spider-Man vol. 1 #6 (February 2001)		
Eddie Brock Jr. Venom	Ultimate Spider-Man vol. 1 #33 (December 2002)		
Eddie Brock Sr.	Ultimate Spider-Man vol. 1 #33 (December 2002)		
Eric Brooks Blade	Ultimate Spider-Man Super Special #1 (June 2002)		
Vernon Brooks	All-New Ultimates #1 (April 2014)		
Burglar	Ultimate Spider-Man vol. 1 #4 (December 2000)		
Roland Burroughs Death Adder	All-New Ultimates #2 (May 2014)		

- Banshee (character) (Sean Cassidy)
- Baron Strucker
- Ben Reilly
- Black Bolt
- Black Jack Tarr
- Black Panther (T'Challa Udaku)
- Black Talon
- Blacklash (Marc Scott)

== C ==
Character	First appearance	Notes	Ref.
Luke Cage Power Man	The Ultimates 2 vol. 1 #6 (May 2005)		
Caliban	Ultimate X-Men vol. 1 #82 (May 2007)		
Callisto	Ultimate X-Men vol. 1 #43 (March 2004)		
Brian Calusky Piledriver	Ultimate Spider-Man vol. 1 #86 (November 2005)		
Henry Camp Bulldozer	Ultimate Spider-Man vol. 1 #86 (November 2005)		
Marian Carlyle Rogue	Ultimate X-Men vol. 1 #7 (June 2001)		
Carnage	Ultimate Spider-Man vol. 1 #61 (June 2004)		
Sharon Carter	Ultimate Spider-Man vol. 1 #16 (December 2001)		
Frank Castle Punisher	Ultimate Marvel Team-Up #6 (July 2001)		
Arthur Centino Longshot	Ultimate X-Men vol. 1 #54 (January 2005)		
Chang Lam Abomination	The Ultimates 2 vol. 1 #9 (December 2005)		
Monica Chang Black Widow	Ultimate Comics: Avengers #3 (October 2009)		
Amadeus Cho	Cataclysm: The Ultimates' Last Stand #2 (December 2013)		
Malcolm Colcord	Ultimate Origins #1 (June 2008)		
Curt Conners Lizard	Ultimate Marvel Team-Up #10 (December 2001)		
Doris Conners	Ultimate Marvel Team-Up #10 (December 2001)		
Timmy Conners	Ultimate Marvel Team-Up #10 (December 2001)		
Valerie Cooper	Ultimate Fallout #4 (August 2011)		
Abraham Cornelius	Ultimate Origins #1 (June 2008)		
Ashley Crawford Big Bertha	Ultimate X-Men vol. 1 #50 (August 2004)		
Victor Creed Sabretooth	Ultimate Marvel Team-Up #1 (February 2001)		

- Camellia
- Cannonball (Sam Guthrie)
- Captain Atlas
- Captain France (Hugo Etherlinck)
- Captain Italy (Umberto Landi)
- Captain Spain (Carlos Fraile)
- Captain UK
- Cathrine Mora
- Chameleon
- The Champion
- Chitauri
- Clay Quartermain
- Valentina Allegra de Fontaine
- Crystal

== D ==
Character	First appearance	Notes	Ref.
Lorna Dane Polaris	Ultimate X-Men vol. 1 #61 (July 2005)		
Carol Danvers	Ultimate Secret #1 (March 2005)		
Aaron Davis Prowler	Ultimate Comics: Spider-Man #1 (September 2011)		
Anthony Davis Ringer	Ultimate Spider-Man vol. 1 #91 (March 2006)		
Jefferson Davis	Ultimate Comics: Spider-Man #1 (September 2011)		
Death Adder	Ultimate Power #1 (October 2006)		
Renee Deladier Ecstasy	All-New Ultimates #10 (November 2014)		
Charles Delazny Scourge	All-New Ultimates #2 (May 2014)		
Paul Dennis Crippler	All-New Ultimates #2 (May 2014)		
Max Dillon Electro	Ultimate Spider-Man vol. 1 #10 (June 2001)		
Dormammu	Ultimatum #4 (June 2009)		
Heather Douglas Moondragon	Ultimate Extinction #1 (January 2006)		
Blackie Drago Vulture	Ultimate Spider-Man vol. 1 #89 (January 2006)		
Bobby Drake Iceman	Ultimate X-Men vol. 1 #1 (December 2000)		
Jessica Drew Spider-Woman / Black Widow	Ultimate Spider-Man vol. 1 #98 (August 2006)		
Beatta Dubiel Bloodlust	All-New Ultimates #8 (September 2014)		
Zelda DuBois Princess Python	Ultimate Power #1 (October 2006)		
Dum Dum Dugan	Ultimate X-Men vol. 1 #39 (November 2003)		
Franklin Dukes Blob	Ultimate X-Men vol. 1 #3 (February 2001)		

- Dai Thomas
- Daniel Toliver
- Derek Morgan
- Detonator (Ricky Gibson)
- Diablo (Esteban Corazon de Ablo)
- Domino
- Drake Raven
- Doombot
- Dreamcatcher
- De Lone Wolf (Asim Limbu)

== E ==
Character	First appearance	Notes	Ref.
Abraham Erskine	Ultimate Origins #1 (June 2008)		
Nathaniel Essex Mister Sinister	Ultimate X-Men vol. 1 #46 (May 2004)		

- Echo (Maya Lopez)
- Enchantress
- Enid Rich

== F ==
Character	First appearance	Notes	Ref.
Amahl Farouk Shadow King	Ultimate X-Men vol. 1 #81 (April 2007)		
Johann Fennhoff Doctor Faustus	Ultimate Comics: Armor Wars #2 (October 2009)		
Fin	All-New Ultimates #1 (April 2014)		
Wilson Fisk Kingpin	Ultimate Spider-Man vol. 1 #9 (May 2001)		
Leeann Foreman Whiplash	All-New Ultimates #8 (September 2014)		
Danielle Forte Mindblast	All-New Ultimates #8 (September 2014)		
Frederick Foswell Mister Big	Ultimate Spider-Man vol. 1 #9 (May 2001)		
Frank Spot	Ultimate Spider-Man vol. 1 #111 (July 2007)		
Eliot Franklin Thunderball	Ultimate Spider-Man vol. 1 #86 (November 2005)		
Deacon Frost	Ultimate Avengers vs. New Ultimates #2 (March 2011)		
Emma Frost	Ultimate X-Men vol. 1 #42 (February 2004)		
Nick Fury	Ultimate Marvel Team-Up #5 (June 2001)		

- Fandral
- Fenris (Andrea and Andreas von Strucker)
- Filament
- Fin Casey (Ivory Shadow)
- Firepower
- Forge (unknown)
- Fountain
- Franklin Richards
- Fred "Flash" Thompson
- Fury

== G ==
Character	First appearance	Notes	Ref.
Gah Lak Tus	Ultimate Extinction #1 (January 2006)		
Albert Gaines Nuke	Supreme Power vol. 1 #18 (August 2005)		
Maximus Gargan Scorpion	Ultimate Comics: Spider-Man #6 (January 2012)		
Dirk Garthwaite Wrecker	Ultimate Spider-Man vol. 1 #86 (November 2005)		
Geldoff Proton	Ultimate Spider-Man vol. 1 #40 (May 2003)		
Ghost	Ultimate Comics: Armor Wars #1 (September 2009)		
Marie Grant Tigra	Ultimate Comics: The Ultimates #22 (March 2013)		
Jean Grey Marvel Girl / Phoenix	Ultimate X-Men vol. 1 #1 (December 2000)		
Ben Grimm The Thing	Ultimate Fantastic Four #1 (January 2004)		

- Gallowglass
- Gambit (Remy LeBeau)
- Garrison Kane
- Ghostware
- Gladiator
- Glenn Talbot
- Gorgon
- Grizzly

== H ==
Character	First appearance	Notes	Ref.
Mark Hallett Sunder	Ultimate X-Men vol. 1 #82 (May 2007)		
Justin Hammer	Ultimate Spider-Man vol. 1 #16 (December 2001)		
Justine Hammer	Ultimate Comics: Armor Wars #1 (September 2009)		
Felicia Hardy Black Cat	Ultimate Spider-Man vol. 1 #50 (December 2003)		
Daimon Hellstrom Son of Satan	The Ultimates 2 vol. 1 #6 (May 2005)		
H.E.R.B.I.E.	Ultimate Fantastic Four #25 (November 2005)		
Hercules	Ultimate Comics: The Ultimates #27 (July 2013)		
Robert Herman Glob Herman	Ultimate Comics: X-Men #23 (February 2013)		
Happy Hogan	The Ultimates vol. 1 #2 (February 2002)		
Heather Hudson	Ultimate X: Origins #1 (February 2010)		
James Hudson	Ultimate X: Origins #1 (February 2010)		
Jimmy Hudson Wolverine	Ultimate X: Origins #1 (February 2010)		
Hurricane	The Ultimates 2 vol. 1 #9 (December 2005)		

- Hammer (Eisenhower Canty)
- Hard-Drive (unknown)
- Hawk-Owl (Jack Danner)
- Hawkeye (Clint Barton)
- Heather Hudson
- Heimdall
- Hela
- Hogun
- Howard the Duck

== I ==
Character	First appearance	Notes	Ref.
Hisako Ichiki Armor	Ultimate Comics: X-Men #18 (October 2012)		

- Inertia (Squadron Supreme)

== J ==
Character	First appearance	Notes	Ref.
J. Jonah Jameson	Ultimate Spider-Man vol. 1 #6 (February 2001)		
Janis Black Mamba	Ultimate Power #1 (October 2006)		
Edwin Jarvis	The Ultimates vol. 1 #2 (February 2002)		
Daisy Johnson Quake	Ultimate Comics: The Ultimates #22 (March 2013)		
Tyrone Johnson Cloak	Ultimate Comics: Spider-Man #23 (May 2013)		
Jessica Jones	Ultimate Spider-Man vol. 1 #106 (March 2007)		
Joseph Hammerhead	Ultimate X-Men vol. 1 #13 (December 2001)		
Eugene Judd Puck	Ultimate X-Men vol. 1 #50 (August 2004)		

- Jackal
- James Braddock
- James Hudson
- Jane Foster
- Jeanne de Wolfe
- John Ryker

== K ==
Character	First appearance	Notes	Ref.
Kaine	Ultimate Spider-Man vol. 1 #97 (July 2006)		
Danny Ketch Machine Man	Ultimate Comics: The Ultimates #27 (July 2013)		
Misty Knight	Ultimate Extinction #1 (January 2006)		
Sergei Kravinoff Kraven the Hunter	Ultimate Spider-Man vol. 1 #16 (December 2001)		
Kuan-Yin Xorn	Ultimate Comics: Hawkeye #3 (October 2011)		

- Kang the Conqueror
- Karnak
- Ka-Zar
- Kenny "King Kong" McFarlane
- Kree

== L ==
Character	First appearance	Notes	Ref.
Cassie Lang Giant-Woman / Stature	Ultimate Comics: The Ultimates #17 (October 2012)		
Scott Lang Giant-Man	Ultimate Avengers vs. New Ultimates #1 (February 2011)		
Petra Laskov Swarm / Wasp	The Ultimates 2 vol. 1 #9 (December 2005)		
Joseph Ledger Doctor Spectrum	Supreme Power vol. 1 #2 (September 2003)		
Ganke Lee	Ultimate Comics: Spider-Man #2 (September 2011)		
Leech	Ultimate X-Men vol. 1 #81 (April 2007)		
Miranda Leevald Stacy X	Ultimate X-Men vol. 1 #81 (April 2007)		
Rachel Leighton Diamondback	All-New Ultimates #1 (April 2014)		
Erik Lensherr Magneto	Ultimate X-Men vol. 1 #1 (December 2000)		
Pietro Lensherr Quicksilver	Ultimate X-Men vol. 1 #1 (December 2000)		
Wanda Lensherr Scarlet Witch	Ultimate X-Men vol. 1 #1 (December 2000)		
Logan Cable	Ultimate X-Men vol. 1 #75 (October 2006)		
Logan Wolverine	Ultimate X-Men vol. 1 #1 (December 2000)		

- Lady Lark
- Lady Mastermind
- Layla Miller
- Lee (first name unknown)
- Leviathan
- Lilandra Neramani
- Lockjaw
- Luke Cage
- Liberatos

== M ==
Character	First appearance	Notes	Ref.
Moira MacTaggert	Ultimate X-Men vol. 1 #16 (March 2002)		
Luther Manning Deathlok	Ultimate Spider-Man vol. 1 #70 (December 2004)		
Conrad Marcus Venom	Ultimate Comics: Spider-Man #1 (September 2011)		
Cain Marko Juggernaut	Ultimate X-Men vol. 1 #8 (August 2001)		
Flint Marko Sandman	Ultimate Spider-Man vol. 1 #17 (January 2002)		
Alicia Masters	Ultimate Fantastic Four #29 (April 2006)		
Anthony Masters Taskmaster	Ultimate Comics: Spider-Man #26 (August 2013)		
Hank McCoy	Ultimate X-Men vol. 1 #1 (December 2000)		
Mephisto	Ultimate Comics: Avengers 2 #3 (June 2010)		
Layla Miller	Ultimate Mystery #3 (September 2010)		
Mark Milton Hyperion	Supreme Power vol. 1 #1 (August 2003)		
Mister Jip	All-New Ultimates #3 (June 2014)		
Robert Mitchell Vision	Ultimate Comics: The Ultimates #22 (March 2013)		
Arthur Molekevic Mole Man	Ultimate Fantastic Four #2 (January 2004)		
Miles Morales Spider-Man	Ultimate Fallout #4 (August 2011)		
Rio Morales	Ultimate Comics: Spider-Man #1 (September 2011)		
Ororo Munroe Storm	Ultimate X-Men vol. 1 #1 (December 2000)		
Matt Murdock Daredevil	Ultimate Marvel Team-Up #7 (September 2001)		
Fred Myers Boomerang	Ultimate Spider-Man vol. 1 #61 (June 2004)		
Mysterio	Ultimate Spider-Man Annual #3 (October 2008)		

- Magician (Elliot Boggs)
- Man-Ape (M'Baku)
- Mandarin
- Marrina Smallwood
- Master Menace (Emil Burbank) (Squadron Supreme)
- Maximus
- Mister Nix
- Mr. Rose
- Morbius (Michael Morbius)
- Morlocks
- Medusa
- Multiple Man (Jamie Madrox)
- Mystique (Raven Darkhölme)
- M-Twins (Nicole and Claudette)
- Machete (Ferdinand Lopez)
- Madame Sanctity (Tanya Trask)
- Maggot (Japheth)
- Magik (Illyana Rasputina)
- Magique
- Magnir
- Maha Yogi
- Mahkizmo
- Mahr Vehl (Geheneris Hala'son)
- Mainframe
- Major Mapleleaf (Louis Sadler Jr.)
- Malice
- Mammomax (Maximus Jensen)
- Man-Beast
- Man-Elephant (Manfred Haller)
- Man-Killer (Katrina Van Horn)
- Man-Spider (Peter Parker)
- Manbot (Bernie Lachenay)
- Mangog
- Manifold (Eden Fesi)
- Manikin (Whitman Knapp)
- Manphibian
- Mansalughter
- Manta
- Marrow (Sarah)
- Marvel Boy (Noh-Varr)
- Marvelman (Michael Moran)
- Massacre (Marcus Lyman)
- Masked Marauder (Frank Farnum)
- Masked Raider (Jim Gardley)
- Mass Master (Jack Power)
- Master Hate (Sire Hate)
- Master Khan
- Mastermind Excello (Amadeus Cho)
- Master Mold (Stephen Lang)
- Master of the World (Eshu)
- Master Order
- Match (Anthony Masters)
- Maxam
- Megatak (Gregory Nettles)
- Meggan
- Mentallo (Marvin Flumm)
- Micromax (Scott Wright)
- Milan (Francisco)
- Mimic (Calvin Rankin)
- Mindless Ones
- Mindworm (William Turner)
- Minotaur (Dario Agger)
- Miracle Man (Joshua Ayers)
- Mirage (Desmond Charne)
- Mister M (Absolon Mercator)
- Modred the Mystic

== N ==
Character	First appearance	Notes	Ref.
Namor	Ultimate Fantastic Four #24 (October 2005)		
Namora	Ultimate Fantastic Four #60 (February 2009)		
Elektra Natchios	Ultimate Spider-Man Super Special #1 (June 2002)		
Cleo Nefertiti Asp	Ultimate Power #1 (October 2006)		
Foggy Nelson	Ultimate Daredevil and Elektra #1 (November 2002)		
Nightmare	Ultimate Spider-Man vol. 1 #70 (December 2004)		
Nihil	Ultimate Fantastic Four #15 (January 2005)		

- Nathaniel Richards
- Nerd Hulk (clone of Hulk)
- Nebula
- The New Sentinels
- Northstar (Jean-Paul Beaubier)
- Nova (Rick Jones)
- Nuke

== O ==
Character	First appearance	Notes	Ref.
Otto Octavius Doctor Octopus	Ultimate Spider-Man vol. 1 #2 (October 2000)		
Balder Odinson	Ultimate Comics: Thor #1 (October 2010)		
Loki Odinson	The Ultimates 2 vol. 1 #1 (December 2004)		
Thor Odinson	The Ultimates vol. 1 #4 (May 2002)		
Alex O'Hirn R.H.I.N.O.	Ultimate Spider-Man vol. 1 #28 (October 2002)		
Frank Oliver Kangaroo	Ultimate Spider-Man Annual #2 (August 2006)		
Brigid O'Reilly	All-New Ultimates #1 (April 2014)		
Harry Osborn Hobgoblin	Ultimate Spider-Man vol. 1 #1 (September 2000)		
Martha Osborn	Ultimate Spider-Man vol. 1 #5 (January 2001)		
Norman Osborn Green Goblin	Ultimate Spider-Man vol. 1 #1 (September 2000)		
Yuriko Oyama Deathstrike	Ultimate X-Men vol. 1 #59 (May 2005)		

- Omega Red (unknown)
- Onslaught
- Orb Weaver (unknown)
- Owl

== P ==
Character	First appearance	Notes	Ref.
Karen Page	Ultimate Marvel Team-Up #7 (September 2001)		
Ben Parker	Ultimate Spider-Man vol. 1 #1 (September 2000)		
Mary Parker	Ultimate Spider-Man vol. 1 #33 (December 2002)		
May Parker	Ultimate Spider-Man vol. 1 #1 (September 2000)		
Peter Parker Spider-Man	Ultimate Spider-Man vol. 1 #1 (September 2000)		
Richard Parker	Ultimate Spider-Man vol. 1 #33 (December 2002)		
Perun	The Ultimates 2 vol. 1 #9 (December 2005)		
Benjamin Poindexter Bullseye	Ultimate Elektra #2 (September 2004)		
Melvin Potter Gladiator	Ultimate Spider-Man vol. 1 #60 (June 2004)		
Pepper Potts	The Ultimates vol. 1 #2 (February 2002)		
John Proudstar Shaman	Ultimate X-Men vol. 1 #94 (May 2008)		
Hank Pym Giant-Man / Ant-Man / Yellowjacket	The Ultimates vol. 1 #2 (February 2002)		
Janet Pym Wasp	The Ultimates vol. 1 #2 (February 2002)		
Pyro	Ultimate X-Men vol. 1 #80 (March 2007)		

- Pandora (Margaret Watson)
- Penultimate
- Phil Coulson
- Phoebe McAllister
- Piledriver
- Primal Screamer
- The Principal (Larry Jones)
- Proteus (David Xavier)
- Ultimate Marvel

== Q ==
- Quasar (Wendell Vaughn)

== R ==
Character	First appearance	Notes	Ref.
Norrin Radd Silver Searcher	Ultimate Fantastic Four #42 (May 2007)		
Danny Rand Iron Fist	Ultimate Spider-Man vol. 1 #½ (January 2001)		
Peter Rasputin Colossus	Ultimate X-Men vol. 1 #1 (December 2000)		
Elizabeth Rawson Knockout	All-New Ultimates #8 (September 2014)		
Mark Raxton	Ultimate Spider-Man vol. 1 #78 (June 2005)		
Red Skull	Ultimate Comics: Avengers #1 (August 2009)		
Regent	Ultimate Fantastic Four #45 (August 2007)		
Jim Rhodes War Machine	Ultimate Origins #5 (October 2008)		
Kingsley Rice Amphibian	Supreme Power vol. 1 #2 (September 2003)		
Reed Richards Mister Fantastic / Maker	Ultimate Fantastic Four #1 (January 2004)		
Kyle Richmond Nighthawk	Supreme Power vol. 1 #2 (September 2003)		
Robbie Robertson	Ultimate Spider-Man vol. 1 #6 (February 2001)		
Steve Rogers Captain America	The Ultimates vol. 1 #1 (January 2002)		
Natalia Romanova Black Widow	Ultimate Marvel Team-Up #14 (March 2002)		
Ronan	Ultimate Fantastic Four #35 (October 2006)		
Betty Ross She-Hulk	The Ultimates vol. 1 #3 (March 2002)		
Thunderbolt Ross	Ultimate Marvel Team-Up #3 (May 2001)		
Dan Rubinstein Fancy Dan	Ultimate Spider-Man vol. 1 #8 (April 2001)		
Brock Rumlow Crossbones	All-New Ultimates #2 (May 2014)		

- Rage
- Red Ghost
- Red Guardian
- Rhona Burchill
- Robbie Burchill
- Ronin

== S ==
Character	First appearance	Notes	Ref.
Ariana Saddiqi Black Racer	All-New Ultimates #1 (April 2014)		
Ted Sallis Man-Thing	Ultimate Marvel Team-Up #10 (December 2001)		
Bruno Sanchez Ox	Ultimate Spider-Man vol. 1 #8 (April 2001)		
Ophelia Sarkissian Viper	Ultimatum: Spider-Man Requiem #1 (June 2009)		
Schizoid Man	The Ultimates 2 vol. 1 #9 (December 2005)		
Terry Schreck Terror	All-New Ultimates #1 (April 2014)		
Herman Schultz Shocker	Ultimate Spider-Man vol. 1 #8 (April 2001)		
Scorpion	Ultimate Spider-Man vol. 1 #97 (July 2006)		
Sebastian Shaw	Ultimate X-Men vol. 1 #24 (November 2002)		
Shinobi Shaw	Ultimate X-Men vol. 1 #81 (April 2007)		
Shen-Yin Zorn	Ultimate Comics: Hawkeye #3 (October 2011)		
Allan Silvermane	Ultimate X-Men vol. 1 #14 (February 2002)		
Rahne Sinclair Wolfsbane / Sasquatch	Ultimate X-Men vol. 1 #43 (March 2004)		
Blanche Sitznski Anaconda	All-New Ultimates #4 (June 2014)		
Marc Spector Moon Knight / Ronin	Ultimate Spider-Man vol. 1 #79 (July 2005)		
Gwen Stacy	Ultimate Spider-Man vol. 1 #14 (October 2001)		
John Stacy	Ultimate Spider-Man vol. 1 #5 (January 2001)		
Loni Stane	Ultimate Iron Man #1 (March 2005)		
Obadiah Stane	Ultimate Iron Man #3 (August 2005)		
Zebediah Stane	Ultimate Iron Man #1 (March 2005)		
Gregory Stark			
Maria Stark	Ultimate Marvel Team-Up #4 (May 2001)		
Tony Stark Iron Man	Ultimate Marvel Team-Up #4 (May 2001)		
Elijah Stern Tinkerer	Ultimate Spider-Man vol. 1 #90 (February 2006)		
Samuel Sterns	Ultimate Mystery #3 (September 2010)		
Stanley Stewart Blur	Supreme Power vol. 1 #1 (August 2003)		
Gerald Stone Stone	All-New Ultimates #1 (April 2014)		
Franklin Storm	Ultimate Fantastic Four #1 (January 2004)		
Johnny Storm Human Torch	Ultimate Fantastic Four #1 (January 2004)		
Mary Storm Doctor Doom	Ultimate Fantastic Four #23 (September 2005)		
Sue Storm Invisible Woman	Ultimate Fantastic Four #1 (January 2004)		
Clea Strange	Ultimate Marvel Team-Up #12 (January 2002)		
Stephen Strange Jr. Doctor Strange	Ultimate Marvel Team-Up #12 (January 2002)		
Stephen Strange Sr. Doctor Strange	Ultimate Marvel Team-Up #12 (January 2002)		
Alex Summers Havok	Ultimate X-Men vol. 1 #46 (May 2004)		
Scott Summers Cyclops	Ultimate X-Men vol. 1 #1 (December 2000)		

- Sentinels
- Shadowcat (Kitty Pryde)
- Shape (Squadron Supreme)
- Sky-Eater
- Skrull
- Snowbird (Narya)

== T ==
Character	First appearance	Notes	Ref.
Tarantula	Ultimate Spider-Man vol. 1 #100 (September 2006)		
George Tarleton	Ultimate Vision #1 (December 2006)		
David Taylor Styx	All-New Ultimates #1 (April 2014)		
Thanos	Ultimate Fantastic Four #35 (October 2006)		
Tigershark	Ultimate Fantastic Four #60 (February 2009)		
Adrian Toomes	Ultimate Spider-Man vol. 1 #125 (August 2008)		
Mortimer Toynbee Toad	Ultimate X-Men vol. 1 #1 (December 2000)		
Duc No Tranh Bengal	All-New Ultimates #7 (August 2014)		
Bolivar Trask	Ultimate X-Men vol. 1 #1 (December 2000)		

- Titanium Man
- Tom Thumb (Squadron Supreme)
- Trey Langstrom
- Triton
- Thunderbolt

== U ==
Character	First appearance	Notes	Ref.
Ben Urich	Ultimate Spider-Man vol. 1 #6 (February 2001)		
Ultron Yellowjacket	The Ultimates 2 vol. 1 #6 (May 2005)		

- Unus (unknown)
- Unicorn
- Ulik (Rock Troll)
- Ultimatum (Comic Miles Morales)
- Ultimo (Giant Robot)
- Ultimus (Ard-Con)
- Ultragirl (Suzy Sherman)
- U-Man (Meranno)
- Underworld
- Uni-Mind
- Union Jack (Joseph Chapman)
- Underdog (TV series)
- Unuscione
- Uranos
- Phil Urich
- Ursa Major (Mikhail Ursus)

== V ==
Character	First appearance	Notes	Ref.
Victor Van Damme Doctor Doom	Ultimate Fantastic Four #2 (January 2004)		
Bram Velsing Dreadknight	Ultimate Comics: Armor Wars #2 (October 2009)		
Volstagg	The Ultimates 2 vol. 1 #1 (December 2004)		
Klaus Voorhees King Cobra	All-New Ultimates #2 (May 2014)		

- Valkyrie (Barbara (surname unknown))
- Vanisher (unknown)
- Vision
- Valkume
- Vagabond
- Valkin
- Vanguard
- Vapor
- Vargas
- Varnae
- Veil

== W ==
Character	First appearance	Notes	Ref.
Kurt Wagner Nightcrawler	Ultimate X-Men vol. 1 #7 (June 2001)		
John Walker	Ultimate Comics: X-Men #9 (March 2012)		
Patsy Walker Hellcat	Ultimate Spider-Man vol. 1 #8 (April 2001)		
Jennifer Walters	The Ultimates 2 vol. 1 #3 (February 2005)		
Warlock	Ultimate X-Men vol. 1 #58 (April 2005)		
Watcher	Ultimate Origins #2 (July 2008)		
Mary Jane Watson	Ultimate Spider-Man vol. 1 #1 (September 2000)		
Cassandra Webb	Ultimate Spider-Man vol. 1 #102 (November 2006)		
Edward Whelan Vermin	All-New Ultimates #7 (August 2014)		
Dane Whitman Black Knight	Ultimate Comics: The Ultimates #22 (March 2013)		
Leonard Williams Tyrone Cash	Ultimate Comics: Avengers 2 #1 (April 2010)		
Riri Williams Ironheart	Spider-Men II #5 (December 2017)		
Simon Williams Wonder Man	Ultimate Comics: The Ultimates #22 (March 2013)		
Sam Wilson Falcon	Ultimate Nightmare #1 (August 2004)		
Wadey Wilson Deadpool	Ultimate Spider-Man vol. 1 #91 (March 2006)		
Pete Wisdom Leader	Ultimate Human #1 (January 2008)		
Wong	Ultimate Marvel Team-Up #12 (January 2002)		
Jimmy Woo	Ultimate Spider-Man vol. 1 #16 (December 2001)		
Warren Worthington III Angel	Ultimate X-Men vol. 1 #40 (December 2003)		
John Wraith Vindicator	Ultimate X-Men vol. 1 #2 (January 2001)		
Jason Wyngarde Mastermind	Ultimate X-Men vol. 1 #3 (February 2001)		

- Wiz Kid (Taki Matsuya)
- Wildpack (Chen, Powell, Quartermain)
- Woody (Hank Kipple)
- Walking Stiletto
- Wallflower (Laurie Collins)
- Walrus (Hubert Carpenter)
- War (Abraham Kieros)
- Warpath (James Proudstar)
- Warrior Woman (Julia Frieda Koenig Lohmer)
- Warstar (B'nee)

== X ==
Character	First appearance	Notes	Ref.
Charles Xavier Professor X	Ultimate X-Men vol. 1 #1 (December 2000)		
David Xavier Proteus	Ultimate X-Men vol. 1 #16 (March 2002)		
Xuân Cao Mạnh Karma	Ultimate X-Men vol. 1 #42 (February 2004)		

== Y ==
Character	First appearance	Notes	Ref.
Yao Ancient One	Ultimate Spider-Man vol. 1 #70 (December 2004)		
Shiro Yoshida Sunfire	Ultimate X-Men vol. 1 #94 (May 2008)		

- Ymir (Ice Giant)
- Y'Garon
- Yandroth
- Mariko Yashida
- Shingen Yashida
- Yellow Claw (Plan Tzu)
- Yeti
- Ho Yinsen
- Yon-Rogg (Magnitron)

== Z ==
Character	First appearance	Notes	Ref.
Zarda Power Princess	Supreme Power vol. 1 #2 (September 2003)		
Helmutt Zemo	Ultimate Comics: Thor #1 (October 2010)		
Zheng Shang-Chi	Ultimate Marvel Team-Up #15 (April 2002)		
Arnim Zola I	The Ultimates 2 Annual #2 (August 2006)		
Arnim Zola III	Ultimate Mystery #3 (September 2010)		

- Zabu
- Zero
- Zadkiel
- Zeus
- Zaladane
- Zarathos
- Zarrko
- Zeitgeist
- Zephyr
- Zero-G
- Zheng Zu
