= Trouble (comics) =

2003 Marvel Comics series

- Cover of Trouble #1.

Publication information
- Publisher: Marvel Comics (Epic Comics)
- Schedule: Monthly
- Format: Limited
- Genre: Romance
- Publication date: September 2003 – January 2004
- No. of issues: 5
- Main character(s): May Reilly, Mary Fitzpatrick, Ben Parker, Richie Parker

Creative team
- Written by: Mark Millar
- Penciller: Terry Dodson
- Inker: Rachel Dodson
- Letterer: Chris Eliopoulos
- Colorists: Matt Hollingsworth; Brian Reber

Collected editions
- Trouble: ISBN 978-0785150862

Trouble is a five-issue limited comic book series written by Mark Millar and illustrated by Terry and Rachel Dodson. It was published from 2003 to 2004 by Marvel Comics as the debut title for its relaunched Epic Comics imprint. The series follows the summer vacation of recent high school graduates May, Mary, Ben, and Richie, depicting subjects such as abstinence, teenage pregnancy, and abortion.

The series was heavily marketed as a potential new origin story for the superhero Spider-Man (Peter Parker), with much of the promotion centered around how the series' primary characters are heavily suggested to be younger versions of Spider-Man's family members Aunt May, Uncle Ben, and Richard and Mary Parker. This reflected the so-called "made-you-look" marketing strategy Marvel pursued in the early 2000s under executive vice president Bill Jemas, characterized by provocative editorial gimmicks aimed at attracting media coverage at little direct financial cost to the company.

Trouble was positioned by Marvel as an attempt to broaden its appeal among female readers by re-expanding into romance comics, a genre which enjoyed significant popularity in the mid-20th century, and to expand from the comic book store market into the more lucrative bookstore market. Though the first issue of Trouble went to a second printing in a significant reversal of Marvel's then-longstanding policy never to reprint comics, the series received generally negative reviews from critics, underperformed commercially, and was never formally incorporated into the broader Spider-Man canon.

== Plot ==
May and her best friend Mary get summer jobs at a resort in The Hamptons, where they begin dating fellow workers Ben and his brother Richie, respectively. May and Ben's relationship soon becomes sexual, but Mary tells Richie she is abstinent. A sexually frustrated Richie begins having an affair with May; soon thereafter, May becomes pregnant. The affair is exposed after May discloses her pregnancy to Ben, and he responds that he cannot be the father as he is sterile.

Fearing reprisal from her religious parents, May considers an abortion before deciding to run away from home. A desperate May later contacts Mary, and despite Mary's continued anger over the affair, she agrees to help her. Mary formulates a plan to claim May's baby as her own, allowing May to conceal the truth from her parents and test Richie's commitment to their relationship. May gives birth and returns to her parents, and Mary and Richie begin to raise her son Peter as their child.

== Development ==
=== Context ===
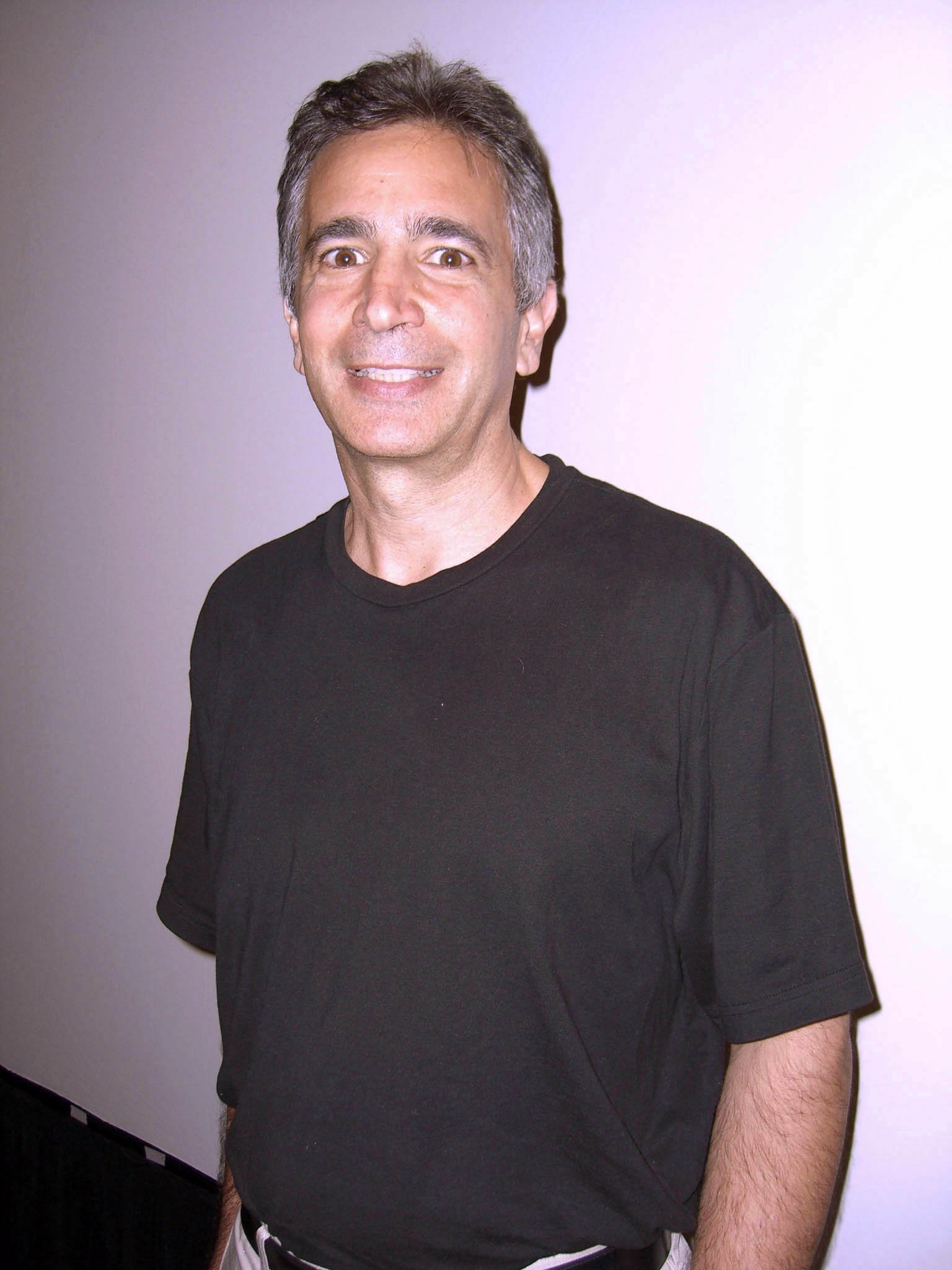
Bill Jemas (pictured 2010)

Bill Jemas became executive vice president of Marvel Comics in 2000, and significantly reorganized the company as it emerged from its mid-1990s bankruptcy proceedings. Among these changes were replacing Marvel editor-in-chief Bob Harras with Joe Quesada, and withdrawing the company from the Comics Code Authority (CCA), a system of comic book content regulation. The latter change allowed Marvel to depict material in their comics that had been forbidden under the CCA, such as sexual intercourse. The company also sought to expand from the comic book store market into the more lucrative bookstore market, whose comic sales were dominated by graphic novels and manga, and made its first attempt to break into this market with the 2003 young adult novel Mary Jane by Judith O'Brien.

Jemas pursued a so-called "made-you-look" marketing strategy of provocative editorial gimmicks aimed at attracting media coverage at little direct financial cost to Marvel, such as reimagining the Rawhide Kid as an openly gay character and publishing the limited series Truth: Red, White & Black, which introduced an African American Captain America. He additionally oversaw a revival of Marvel's Epic Comics imprint, which was to publish a combination of creator owned comics, new interpretations of existing Marvel characters, and comics based on licensed properties from other media such as television.

=== Production ===
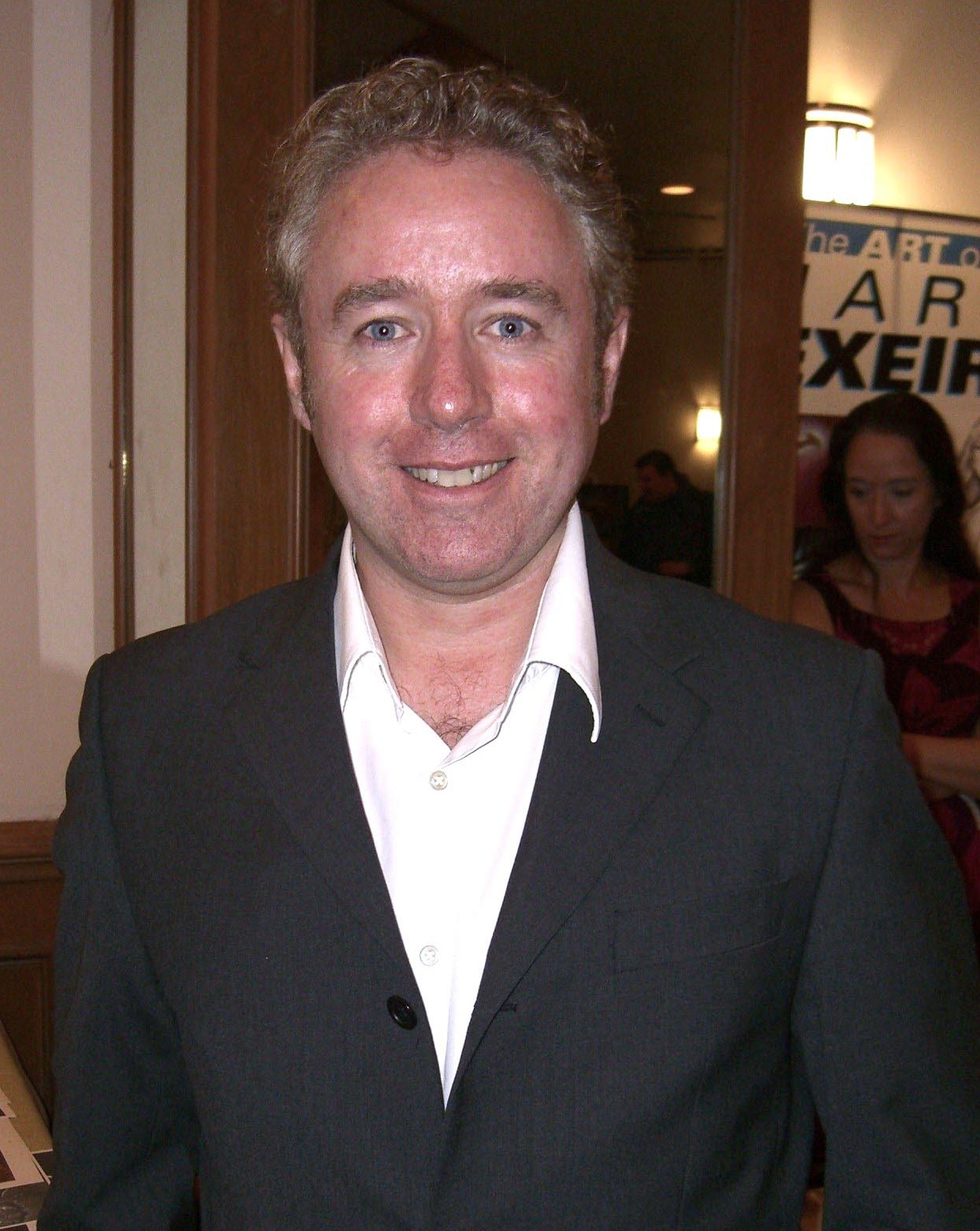
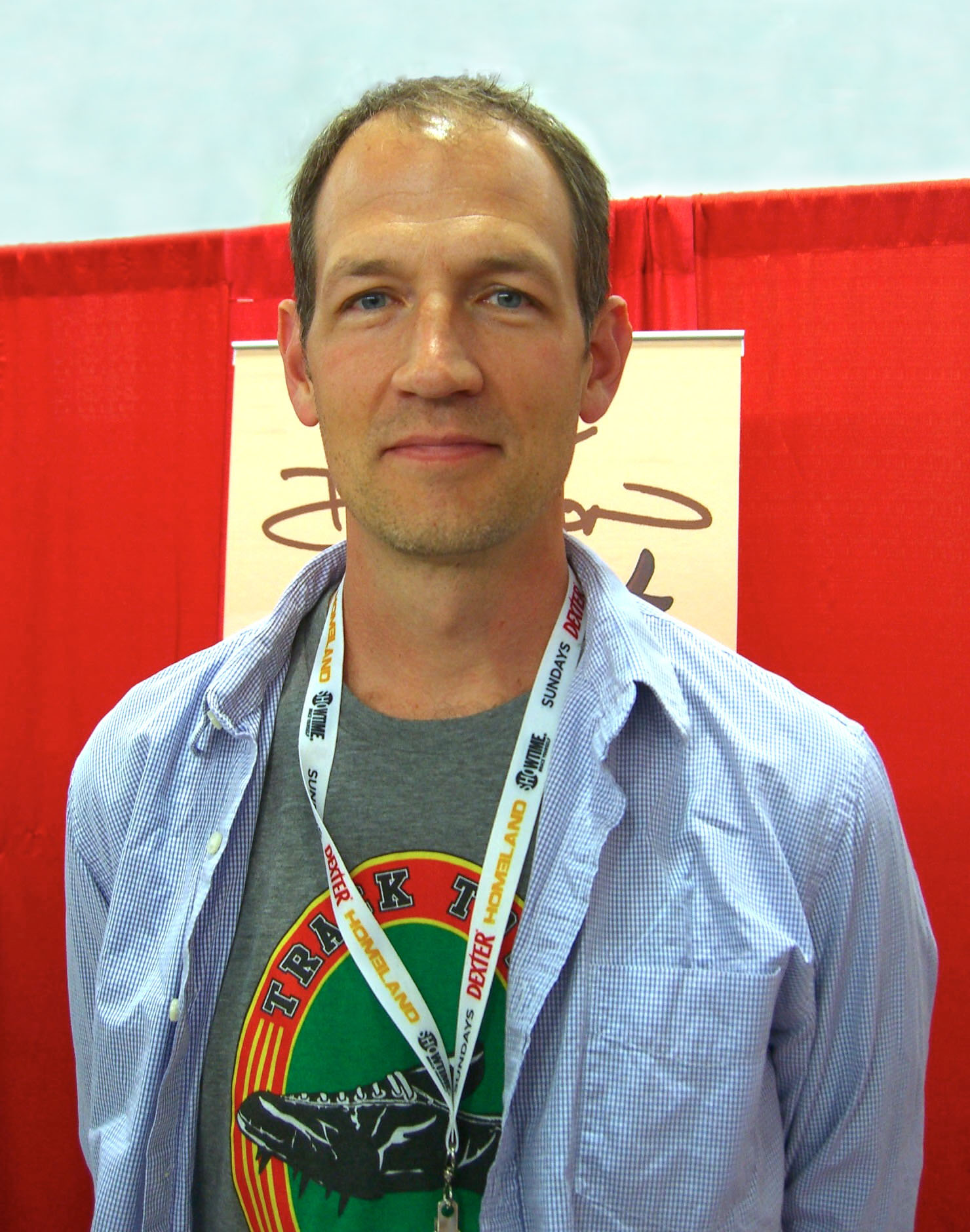
Mark Millar (left, pictured 2010) and Terry Dodson (right, pictured 2012)

The concept for Trouble originated from Jemas and Quesada under the working title Parents, and was originally envisioned as a series that would tell the story of Peter Parker's conception. Similarly to the 2002 comic series Origin, which tells the backstory of the superhero Wolverine, Jemas and Quesada aimed to depict an origin story that was distinct from what had been depicted in the then-recent film adaptations of these characters. (Note: Wolverine is a major character in the X-Men film series that began in 2000, while Spider-Man stars in a trilogy of films that began in 2002.) As the story was developed by its creative team, it shifted focus from Spider-Man's conception to the lives of May and Mary, and was renamed Trouble. It was positioned as an attempt to revive romance comics, a genre which enjoyed significant popularity in the mid-20th century but which had dwindled by the 1970s, with the hope that it would appeal to a readership of both women and traditionally male superhero comic readers.

Jemas and Quesada approached writer Mark Millar about writing the series in December 2002; Millar was among Marvel's top talent at the time, following his acclaimed runs on The Authority at WildStorm, and The Ultimates and Ultimate X-Men at Marvel. Millar said that he agreed to take on the series because he thought it was interesting hook for a story that could appeal to both superhero and romance fans – he remarked that Trouble was his first comic that his wife read cover to cover – and that it would be a change of pace from writing superhero comics. He prepared by reading a range of teen and romance publications, and said that he intentionally wrote the story as one that could stand on its own without requiring knowledge of Spider-Man continuity. Millar stated that he was particularly intrigued by the idea that while Aunt May was originally written as being born in the 1920s, Marvel's floating timeline meant that she could have an origin story set in an era closer to the present day.

Terry Dodson, also among Marvel's top creative talent, was Jemas' first choice to illustrate series due to what Jemas described as his "modern day sensibility that also hearkens back to the great romance books of the past". Axel Alonso served as the series' editor. The covers of the series were shot by fashion photographer Philippe Biabolos; photographic covers are an atypical approach for comics, and according to Jemas, Biabolos agreed to participate in the project because he was a fan of Marvel.

=== Promotion and release ===
"Is [Trouble] the origin of Spider-Man? I'll give you an honest answer because right now we don't know. I don't think that the answer to that question ought to be up to Joe or Mark or Terry or Axel or me. We think the final answer ought to come from the comics community based on the acceptance of the story."

— Bill Jemas, at a press conference announcing Trouble in 2003

In March 2003, Marvel announced that Epic Comics would be revived with Trouble as its debut title. The series was promoted as the "secret origin" of Spider-Man, with emphasis on how the series' primary characters are heavily suggested to be younger versions of Spider-Man's family members Aunt May, Uncle Ben, and Richard and Mary Parker. Jemas indicated that fan reaction to the series would determine whether Trouble would be formally recognized as Peter Parker's new origin story in subsequent Spider-Man comic books.

Retailers had a largely negative reaction to the early promotion of the book. Jemas remarked that "this policy of not deciding about continuity leaves some enormous problems for our business partners", because "you can't really order Trouble like it's the origin of Wolverine, because we're not calling it the official origin of Spider-Man". The photo covers depicting teen models wearing bikinis faced accusations of having pornographic or even pedophiliac overtones; Marvel and Millar contended that they match the photo covers commonly used for young adult novels aimed at teen girls. Critics noted similarities to the covers of the young adult novel series Gossip Girl, and suggested that the cover appears more sexually suggestive in the context of a comic book shop where other covers are intended to titillate an older audience. Others expressed concern about the depiction of subjects such as teenage pregnancy and abortion in a book ostensibly aimed at children. Millar compared Trouble's depiction of this material to the controversial Stan Lee–authored issues of Amazing Spider-Man in the 1970s where Harry Osborn becomes addicted to amphetamines, with Jemas arguing that as a youth publisher Marvel risks becoming "irrelevant to children by hiding significant issues" from them. Quesada stated that he did not see Trouble as being specifically pro-life or pro-choice, but that it was simply "a story to be told".

In response to this criticism, Marvel pursued an aggressive promotion strategy that saw an in-house advertisement for Trouble placed in all Marvel comic books published in July 2003, and sought to have reviews for the series placed the publications Wizard, Entertainment Weekly, and The Washington Post. Simultaneous with the series announcement, it was revealed that the first issue of Trouble would go to a second printing with a variant cover by the artist Frank Cho if it sold favorably. This marked a significant reversal of what was then Marvel's longstanding policy to never reprint comics in order to preserve their value as collector's items. Certain aspects of the marketing strategy for Trouble were based on Marvel's meetings with retailers, who indicated that the company's marketing strategy of promoting books months from their publication dates in order to compel retailers into ordering them meant that general interest invariably dissipated by the time the book arrived in stores.

The first issue of Trouble was published in July 2003, with a cover date of September 2003, and ran for five issues until January 2004. Jemas stated that he expected Trouble to underperform in the direct market, and that significant sales and market efforts were to be made for the trade paperback edition of the series. This collected edition was to be sold primarily in bookstores, where it was believed the female audience the series was attempting to attract would be more easily reached.

== Reception ==
=== Critical reaction ===
"It's a perfect metaphor for [Marvel's] position, when you think about it: an attempt to break into another, possibly more profitable market, it nonetheless retains just enough trace elements of the Marvel Universe to ensure that Mark Millar remains legally replaceable. It mimics the latest advances in modern teen novels (sex, booze and an attempt to deal with 'modern issues'), but still feels like it was written by committee; I've had a chance to read the first issue, and frankly I couldn't shake the impression that I was about to watch Archie and Veronica fuck."

— Dirk Deppey, reviewing Trouble for The Comics Journal in 2003

Trouble received generally negative reviews from critics, and underperformed commercially. Though the first issue of Trouble sold well enough for the Frank Cho variant cover to print under the title Trouble #1: The Second Chances Edition, the strategy to use the collected edition of the series to expand into the bookstore market never materialized as Trouble would not be published as a trade paperback until 2011. Among the comics enthusiast press, the series frequently places on lists of the worst or most controversial Spider-Man storylines.

Reviewing Trouble for The Comics Journal, Dirk Deppey unfavorably contrasted Trouble to other comics that had gained popularity among female readers such as Love Hina and Chobits, writing that these titles possess "an underlying personality behind the storytelling" because "their authors have an owner's stake in the property and know that they're in it for the long haul," whereas Trouble "reads like its job is to produce a hit comic which leads to bigger paychecks on better projects."

Several critics offered praise for Trouble's attempt to diversify Marvel's editorial output and expand the company beyond traditional comic book stores. Comics critic Ora C. McWilliams considers Trouble as an "interesting derivation" that demonstrates the extent to which Marvel was willing to potentially change the origin of one of its most prominent characters. They consider the series as an "interesting thought experiment" of a Spider-Man as a comic told from the perspective of Aunt May, a largely underdeveloped secondary character defined almost exclusively by her relationship with Peter Parker.

=== Legacy ===
Trouble's revelation that Aunt May is not Peter Parker's aunt but his biological mother was never acknowledged in subsequent Spider-Man stories. McWilliams writes that it "may never be known" whether Trouble represented a genuine attempt to write a new origin story for Spider-Man or was "simply Marvel attempting to attract attention to the new book." Jemas' aspirations for Trouble and Epic Comics as parts of a broader sales and marketing strategy for Marvel would never come to pass: by October 2003 his responsibilities within the company had been curtailed significantly, reportedly because Marvel chief creative officer Avi Arad believed his "made-you-look" marketing strategy was hindering efforts to pitch Marvel properties to Hollywood studios.

Trouble has only been reprinted once in 2011 and has never been made available on any of Marvel's digital distribution platforms but is available on the kindle app. The series has been cited alongside X-Men: Misfits and Sentinel as being a precursor to the young adult graphic novel line launched by DC Comics.

== See also ==
- Marville (comics), satirical comic written by Bill Jemas
