= Thomas Logan =

- Thomas Logan; Andy Kubert, Art

Publication information
- Publisher: Marvel Comics
- First appearance: Origin #1 (November 2001)
- Created by: Bill Jemas (co-writer); Paul Jenkins (co-writer); Joe Quesada (story); Andy Kubert (art)

In-story information
- Alter ego: Thomas Logan

Thomas Logan is a fictional character appearing in American comic books published by Marvel Comics. The character has been depicted as the biological father of X-Men member Wolverine. He was created by Bill Jemas, Joe Quesada, and Paul Jenkins. He was featured in the limited series Origin, which detailed the youth and formative years of Wolverine and was published from November 2001 to July 2002.

== Fictional character biography ==
Thomas Logan lives in Alberta, Canada during the late 19th century and is the groundskeeper for the Howlett estate. His surname, Logan, implies that Thomas has Scottish ancestry. Thomas is a very short-tempered man and is known to be a heavy drinker. Thomas is abusive towards his son Dog, often beating him severely, and introduces the boy to alcohol. Thomas has a long-time affair with his employer's mentally-unstable wife, Elizabeth Howlett, which resulted in the birth of James Howlett.

After being fired and kicked off his estate for failing to control his son, Thomas returns to his house in the middle of the night, accompanied by Dog. He sneaks into the Howlett household and tries to persuade Elizabeth to leave with him. Before Elizabeth can reply, John returns to the bedroom and is confronted by Logan. After a heated exchange, Thomas shoots and kills John. He is, in turn, killed by James Howlett, who stabs him in the chest with his claws.

== In other media ==
- Thomas Logan appears in X-Men Origins: Wolverine, portrayed by Aaron Jeffery. This version is the father of Victor Creed in addition to Wolverine.
- Thomas Logan appears in the Wolverine: Origin motion comic, voiced by Brian Drummond.
