= Hawk Owl =

Hawk Owl could refer to:

- The northern hawk-owl (Surnia ulula)
- Any of the species of owl in the Australo-Asiatic genus Ninox
- The main character of Ultimate Adventures
