= Lists of Marvel Comics characters =

This is a list of Marvel multiverse fictional characters which were created for and are owned by Marvel Comics. Licensed or creator-owned characters (G.I. Joe, Godzilla, Groo the Wanderer, Men in Black, Conan the Barbarian, Mighty Morphin Power Rangers, RoboCop, Star Trek, Rocko's Modern Life, The Ren and Stimpy Show, etc.) are not included.

Marvel-Electronic Arts video game characters are also included with references. Characters from the Marvel Comics/DC Comics intercompany crossover series of one-shots and Amalgam Comics, created and published by Marvel Comics, are included with reference.

== List ==
- List of Marvel Comics characters: 0–9
- List of Marvel Comics characters: A
- List of Marvel Comics characters: B
- List of Marvel Comics characters: C
- List of Marvel Comics characters: D
- List of Marvel Comics characters: E
- List of Marvel Comics characters: F
- List of Marvel Comics characters: G
- List of Marvel Comics characters: H
- List of Marvel Comics characters: I
- List of Marvel Comics characters: J
- List of Marvel Comics characters: K
- List of Marvel Comics characters: L
- List of Marvel Comics characters: M
- List of Marvel Comics characters: N
- List of Marvel Comics characters: O
- List of Marvel Comics characters: P
- List of Marvel Comics characters: Q
- List of Marvel Comics characters: R
- List of Marvel Comics characters: S
- List of Marvel Comics characters: T
- List of Marvel Comics characters: U
- List of Marvel Comics characters: V
- List of Marvel Comics characters: W
- List of Marvel Comics characters: X
- List of Marvel Comics characters: Y
- List of Marvel Comics characters: Z

== Other character lists ==
- List of alien races in Marvel Comics
- List of hidden races in Marvel Comics
- List of Marvel Comics teams and organizations
- List of criminal organizations in Marvel Comics
- List of S.H.I.E.L.D. members
- List of Inhumans
- List of first appearances in Marvel Comics publications
- List of Marvel Comics Golden Age characters
- List of Ultimate Marvel characters

== See also ==
- Battle dice
- Essential Marvel Comics
- Marvel Universe Cards
- Official Handbook of the Marvel Universe
