= X-Men Origins: Wolverine =

2009 film by Gavin Hood

- Theatrical release poster
- Directed by: Gavin Hood
- Screenplay by: David Benioff; Skip Woods
- Based on: Wolverine by: Roy Thomas; Len Wein; John Romita Sr.
- Produced by: Lauren Shuler Donner; Ralph Winter; Hugh Jackman; John Palermo
- Starring: Hugh Jackman; Liev Schreiber; Danny Huston; Lynn Collins; Ryan Reynolds
- Cinematography: Donald M. McAlpine
- Edited by: Nicolas De Toth; Megan Gill
- Music by: Harry Gregson-Williams
- Production companies: 20th Century Fox; Marvel Entertainment; Dune Entertainment; The Donners' Company; Seed Productions
- Distributed by: 20th Century Fox
- Release dates: April 8, 2009 (Sydney); May 1, 2009 (United States)
- Running time: 107 minutes
- Country: United States
- Language: English
- Budget: $150 million
- Box office: $373 million

X-Men Origins: Wolverine is a 2009 American superhero film based on the Marvel Comics character Wolverine. It is the fourth installment in the X-Men film series, the first Wolverine solo film, and a spin-off/prequel to X-Men (2000). The film was directed by Gavin Hood and written by David Benioff and Skip Woods. Hugh Jackman stars as Wolverine, alongside Liev Schreiber, Danny Huston, Lynn Collins, and Ryan Reynolds. The film's plot details Wolverine's childhood as James Howlett, his time with Major William Stryker's Team X, the bonding of Wolverine's skeleton with the indestructible metal adamantium during the Weapon X program and his relationship with his half-brother Victor Creed.

The film was mostly shot in Australia and New Zealand, with Canada also serving as a location. Filming took place from January to May 2008. Production and post-production were troubled, with delays due to the weather and Jackman's other commitments, an incomplete screenplay that was still being written in Los Angeles while principal photography rolled in Australia, conflicts arising between director Hood and Fox's executives over the film's direction, and an unfinished workprint being leaked on the internet a month before the film's debut.

X-Men Origins: Wolverine was released on May 1, 2009, by 20th Century Fox. The film received mixed reviews from critics. It opened at the top of the North American box office and grossed $179 million in the United States and Canada and $373 million worldwide. Two subsequent films, The Wolverine and Logan, were released in 2013 and 2017, respectively. Beginning with Deadpool (2016), Reynolds would star as a new version of his Origins character, Wade Wilson (as the titular character). Later, both Jackman and Reynolds would star together in the 2024 film Deadpool & Wolverine.

== Plot ==
In 1845, James Howlett, a boy living in the Northwest Territories, witnesses his father's murder by groundskeeper Thomas Logan. Rage activates the boy's mutation: bone claws that protrude from his knuckles, and he impales Thomas, who reveals that he is James' biological father before dying. James flees with Thomas' other son, Victor Creed, James' elder half-brother, who has sharp claw nails and a healing factor mutation like James. They spend the next century fighting in the American Civil War, both World Wars, and the Vietnam War. In Vietnam, the increasingly violent Victor attempts to rape a Vietnamese woman and kills a senior officer who tries to stop him. James returns to Victor and rushes to defend him. The pair is sentenced to execution by firing squad, which they survive. Major William Stryker offers them membership in Team X, a group of mutants including marksman Agent Zero, katana-wielding mercenary Wade Wilson, teleporter John Wraith, super-strong and invulnerable Fred Dukes, and technopath Chris Bradley. They join the team for a few missions, with James using the alias Logan, but Victor and half of the group's lack of self-control and empathy causes Logan to leave.

In 1979, Logan works as a logger in Canada, where he lives with his girlfriend Kayla Silverfox. Stryker and Zero approach Logan, reporting that Wade and Bradley have been killed, revealing someone is targeting the team. Logan refuses to rejoin Stryker, but after finding Kayla's bloodied body in the woods, he realizes that Victor is responsible. He finds Victor at a bar but loses the subsequent fight. Stryker explains that Victor has gone rogue and offers Logan a way to become strong enough to get his revenge. Logan undergoes a painful operation to reinforce his skeleton with adamantium, a virtually indestructible metal. Stryker orders that Logan's memory be erased so he can be used as their personal weapon, but Logan overhears and escapes to a nearby farm, where an elderly couple takes him in. Zero kills the couple the following morning and tries to kill Logan, but Logan takes down Zero's helicopter, killing him as he swears to kill both Stryker and Victor.

Logan locates Wraith and Dukes at a boxing gym in Las Vegas. Dukes, who has ballooned in size due to a guilt-induced eating disorder, explains that Victor still works for Stryker, hunting down mutants for Stryker to experiment on at his new laboratory, located at "The Island". Dukes also mentions Remy "Gambit" LeBeau, the only one who escaped from the island and therefore knew its location. Wraith and Logan find Gambit in New Orleans, and then both fight Victor, who kills Wraith and extracts his DNA. Agreeing to help release mutants that Stryker has captured, Gambit takes Logan to Stryker's facility on Three Mile Island. Logan learns that Kayla is alive, having been forced by Stryker into surveilling him in exchange for her sister's safety. However, Stryker refuses to release her sister and denies Victor the adamantium bonding promised for his service, claiming that test results revealed Victor would not survive the operation. Stryker activates Wade, now known as Weapon XI, a "mutant killer" with the powers of multiple mutants.

As Logan and Victor fight off Weapon XI, Kayla is mortally wounded while leading the captive mutants to Professor Charles Xavier and safety. After Logan kills Weapon XI, Stryker arrives and shoots Logan in the head with two adamantium bullets, rendering him unconscious. Before Stryker can shoot Kayla, she grabs him and uses her mutant power to persuade him to turn around and walk away until his feet bleed, then succumbs to her injuries. Logan regains consciousness but has lost his memory. He notices his dog tags read "Logan" on one side and "Wolverine" on the other; he pauses upon noticing Kayla's body but does not recognize her.

In a mid-credits scene, Stryker is detained for questioning by MPs in connection with the death of General Munson, whom Stryker murdered to protect his experiment. In the theatrical post-credits scene, Logan is at a bar in Japan (Note: Later depicted in The Wolverine.) with a waitress asking if he's drinking to forget. He then answers: "No, I'm drinking to remember". In the home media post-credits scene, Weapon XI's hand crawls out of the rocks and touches his still living head.

== Cast ==
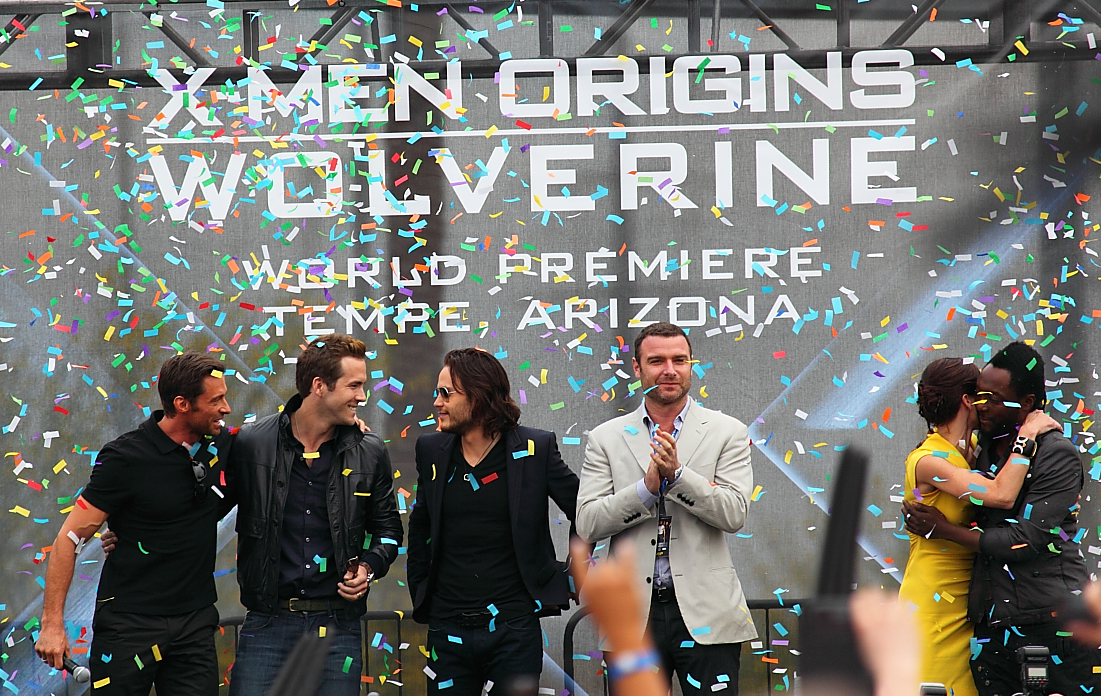
Jackman, Reynolds, Kitsch, Schreiber, Collins and will.i.am at the film's premiere in Tempe, Arizona

- Hugh Jackman as Logan / Wolverine:
  A Canadian mutant and future X-Men member. Jackman became producer of the film via his company Seed Productions and earned $25 million for the film. Jackman underwent a high intensity weight training regimen to improve his physique for the role. He altered the program to shock his body into change and also performed cardiovascular workouts. Jackman noted that no digital touches were applied to his physique in a shot of him rising from the tank within which Wolverine has his bones infused with adamantium.
  - Troye Sivan as James:
    Casting directors cast Sivan as the young Wolverine after seeing him sing at the Channel Seven Perth Telethon, and he was accepted after sending in an audition tape. Kodi Smit-McPhee was originally cast in the role, when filming was originally beginning in December 2007, but he opted out to film The Road. McPhee later played Nightcrawler in X-Men: Apocalypse and Dark Phoenix.
- Liev Schreiber as Victor Creed:
  Logan's mutant half-brother and fellow soldier, who becomes his nemesis Sabretooth. Jackman and Hood compared Wolverine and Victor's relationship to the Borg–McEnroe rivalry in the world of tennis, in that they are enemies but they can't live without each other. Creed represents the pure animal and embodies the darker side of Wolverine's character, the aspect Wolverine hates about himself. These characters are two sides to the same coin. Tyler Mane, who played him in X-Men, had hoped to reprise the role. Jackman worked with Schreiber before, in the 2001 romantic comedy Kate & Leopold and described him as having a competitive streak necessary to portray Creed. They egged each other on set to perform more and more stunts. Schreiber put on 40 lb (18 kg) of muscle for the part, and described his character as the most monstrous role he ever played. As a child, he loved the Wolverine comics because of their unique "urban sensibility". Schreiber had studied to be a fight choreographer and wanted to be a dancer like Jackman, so he enjoyed working out their fight scenes.
  - Michael-James Olsen as young Victor
- Danny Huston as William Stryker:
  Schreiber was originally in negotiations for the part, while Brian Cox, who played the character in X2, wanted to reprise the role. He believed computer-generated imagery, similar to the program applied to Patrick Stewart and Ian McKellen in the opening flashback of X-Men: The Last Stand, would allow him to appear as the younger Stryker. Huston liked the complex Major Stryker, who "both loves and hates mutants because his son was a mutant and drove his wife to suicide. So he understands what they're going through, but despises their destructive force." He compared the character to a racehorse breeder, who rears his mutant experiments like children but abandons them when something goes wrong. His son is shown to be frozen at the Weapon X facility and the reason Stryker starts the Weapon XI program.
- Lynn Collins as Kayla Silverfox:
  Wolverine's Native American (Blackfoot/Niitsítapi) mutant love interest and pawn of Stryker. She has the powers of tactile hypnosis, which allows her to control or convince others to do the things she wants them to by physical touch. However, Victor is immune to telepathy. Describing her role, Collins said "I had to play off all the guys and their testosterone-heavy abilities. But I learned that the female powers of persuasion easily trump fangs and knives and guns." Michelle Monaghan turned down the role because of scheduling conflicts, despite her enthusiasm to work with Jackman. In an article for Indian Country Today, Rob Schmidt criticized the casting of Collins as a character of Blackfoot/Niitsítapi descent as representing part of a broader revival of the practice of redface (the casting of non-Indigenous actors as Indigenous characters) within the film industry.
- will.i.am as John Wraith:
  A teleporting mutant. This was will.i.am's major live-action film debut. Although he initially did not get on with the casting director, he got the role because he wanted to play a mutant with the same power as Nightcrawler. He enrolled in boot camp to get into shape for the part. When filming a fight, he scarred his knuckles after accidentally punching and breaking the camera. Quinton Jackson was offered the role but turned it down.
- Kevin Durand as Fred Dukes:
  A mutant with a nearly-indestructible layer of skin. In the film's early sequences, he is a formidable fighting man, but years later, due to a poor diet, has gained an enormous amount of weight and trains as a boxer to lose weight. Logan taunts Dukes about the whereabouts of Stryker and when he calls him "Bub", Dukes mishears this as "blob" and starts fighting him. A fan of the X-Men movies, Durand contacted the producers for a role as soon as news of a new film came out. The suit went through six months of modifications, and had a tubing system inside to cool Durand down with ice water. David Harbour auditioned for the role, but was turned down for being too fat at the time.
- Dominic Monaghan as Chris Bradley:
  A mutant who can manipulate electricity and electronic objects. It was originally reported that Monaghan was going to play Barnell Bohusk / Beak.
- Taylor Kitsch as Remy LeBeau:
  A Cajun thief who has the ability to convert the potential energy of any object he touches into kinetic energy, forcing it to explode. The size of the object determines the magnitude of the resulting explosion. He is also skilled in the use of a staff and happens to be very agile. Due to the nature of his power, he displays supernatural durability, being able to take Wolverine's elbow to his face and return to fight moments later. When asked about his thoughts on the character, Kitsch had said, "I knew of him, but I didn't know the following he had. I'm sure I'm still going to be exposed to that. I love the character, I love the powers, and I love what they did with him. I didn't know that much, but in my experience, it was a blessing to go in and create my take on him. I'm excited for it, to say the least." Josh Holloway was initially cast in the role but was dropped after the studio wanted someone ten years younger for the role. Chris Hemsworth came close to playing the role, but lost out to Kitsch.
- Daniel Henney as Agent Zero:
  A mutant member of the Weapon X program and a superhumanly accurate assassin with enhanced agility and reflexes, expert tracking abilities and lethal sniper skills. Producer Lauren Shuler Donner says on the DVD commentary that Agent Zero has no scent which makes him difficult for Logan to sense. An X-Men fan, Henney liked the role of a villain because "there are no restrictions playing it, allowing you freely to express it, so you can act how you want to". He described the film as more realistic and cruder than the X-Men trilogy.
- Ryan Reynolds as Wade Wilson:
  A wisecracking mercenary with lethal swordsmanship skill and peak athleticism who is later transformed into Weapon XI. Initially believed to have been killed by Victor, Weapon XI is a genetically altered mutant killer. He has powers taken from other mutants killed or kidnapped in the film, including the power to shoot concussive energy beams from his eyes, healing factor, teleportation, and retractable blades in his arms. He is referred to by Stryker as "the pool, the mutant killer: Deadpool" because the compatible powers of the other mutants have been 'pooled' together into one being. This interpretation of Deadpool is lacking his traditional red suit and mask, and also includes a mouth sewn shut. Reynolds portrays Weapon XI for close-ups, standing shots, and simple stunts while Scott Adkins is used for the more complicated and dangerous stunts. Originally, Reynolds was only going to cameo as Wilson but the role grew after he was cast. Reynolds played a different version of the character in Deadpool, Deadpool 2, and Deadpool & Wolverine.

Additionally, Tim Pocock portrays the young Scott Summers. Max Cullen and Julia Blake portrayed Travis Hudson and Heather Hudson, an elderly couple who take care of Wolverine after his adamantium bonding. The Hudsons are heavily adapted from the comics' James MacDonald and Heather Hudson. Tahyna Tozzi portrays Emma, a mutant with the power to turn her skin into diamond, who in the film is Silverfox's sister. The film depiction of Emma was originally intended to be Emma Frost. However it was noted that she does not exhibit the character's traditional telepathic abilities. It is later revealed by Bryan Singer that this character is actually not Emma Frost, but instead a mutant with similar abilities. January Jones portrayed the actual Emma Frost in the next film, X-Men: First Class. Wolverine's parents also appeared in the film; Aaron Jeffery portrayed Thomas Logan while Alice Parkinson portrayed Elizabeth Howlett and Peter O'Brien appeared as John Howlett. The film includes numerous cameo appearances of younger versions of characters from the previous films, including Jason Stryker (William's lobotomized telepathic son whom he keeps in cryogenic suspension). There was a cameo for a young Storm, which can be seen in the trailer, but it was removed from the released film. Patrick Stewart (digitally rejuvenated) also makes an uncredited cameo as a younger Professor Charles Xavier who appeared to have not yet lost the use of his legs. Asher Keddie played Dr. Carol Frost. Poker player Daniel Negreanu has a cameo. Phil Hellmuth wanted to join him but was unable because he committed to an event in Toronto. X-Men co-creator Stan Lee said he would cameo, but Lee ended up not appearing in the film as he could not attend filming in Australia.

== Production ==
=== Development ===
David Benioff pursued the project for almost three years before he was hired to write the script in October 2004. In preparing to write the script, he reread Barry Windsor-Smith's "Weapon X" story, as well as Chris Claremont and Frank Miller's 1982 limited series on the character (his favorite storyline). Also serving as inspiration was the 2001 limited series Origin, which reveals Wolverine's life before Weapon X. Hugh Jackman collaborated on the script, which he wanted to be more of a character piece compared with the previous X-Men films. Skip Woods, who had written Hitman for Fox, was later hired to revise and rewrite Benioff's script. Benioff had aimed for a "darker and a bit more brutal" story, writing it with an R rating in mind, although he acknowledged the film's final tone would rest with the producers and director.

Deadpool had been developed for his own film by Reynolds and David S. Goyer at New Line Cinema in 2003, but the project fell apart as they focused on Blade: Trinity and an aborted spin-off. Benioff wrote the character into the script in a manner Jackman described as fun, but would also deviate from some of his traits. Similarly, Gambit was a character who the filmmakers had tried to put in the previous X-Men films. Jackman liked Gambit because he is a "loose cannon" like Wolverine, stating their relationship echoes that of Wolverine and Pyro in the original trilogy. David Ayer contributed to the script. Benioff finished his draft in October 2006 and Jackman stated there would be a year before shooting, as he was scheduled to start filming Australia during 2007. Before the 2007–2008 Writers Guild of America strike began, James Vanderbilt and Scott Silver were hired for a last-minute rewrite.

Gavin Hood was announced as director of the project in July 2007 for a 2008 release. Previously, X-Men and X2 director Bryan Singer and X-Men: The Last Stand director Brett Ratner were interested in returning to the franchise, while Alexandre Aja and Len Wiseman also wanted the job. Zack Snyder, who was approached for The Last Stand, turned down this film because he was directing Watchmen. Jackman saw parallels between Logan and the main character in Hood's previous film Tsotsi. Hood explained that while he was not a comic book fan, he "realized that the character of Wolverine, I think his great appeal lies in the fact that he's someone who in some ways, is filled with a great deal of self-loathing by his own nature and he's constantly at war with his own nature". The director described the film's themes as focusing on Wolverine's inner struggle between his animalistic savagery and noble human qualities. Hood enjoyed the previous films, but set out to give the spin-off a different feel. Hood also suggested to make the implied blood relation of Wolverine and Sabretooth into them explicitly being half brothers, as it would help "build up the emotional power of the film". In October, Fox announced a May 1, 2009, release date and the X-Men Origins prefix.

=== Filming ===
Preliminary shooting took place at the Fox Studios Australia in Sydney, during late 2007. Principal photography began in January 2008 in New Zealand. One of the filming locations that was selected was Dunedin. Controversy arose as the Queenstown Lakes District Council disputed the Department of Labour's decision to allow Fox to store explosives in the local ice skating rink. Fox moved some of the explosives to another area. The explosives were used for a shot of the exploding Hudson Farm, a scene which required 13 cameras. Jackman and Palermo's Woz Productions reached an agreement with the council to allow recycling specialists on set to advise the production on being environmentally friendly. According to Hood, the screenplay was still incomplete as filming begun, with the production in Australia receiving regularly new script pages from Los Angeles, at times in the night before shooting.

Filming continued at Fox (where most of the shooting was done) and New Orleans, Louisiana. Cockatoo Island was used for Stryker's facility; the enormous buildings there saved money on digitally expanding a set. Production of the film was predicted to generate A$60 million for Sydney's economy. Principal photography ended by May 23. The second unit continued filming in New Zealand until March 23 and were scheduled to continue filming for two weeks following the first unit's wrap. This included a flashback to Logan during the Normandy Landings, which was shot at Blacksmiths, New South Wales.

Hood and Fox were in dispute on the film's direction. One of the disputes involved the depiction of Wolverine as an Army veteran with post-traumatic stress disorder, with the executives arguing that audiences would not be interested in such heavy themes. The studio had two replacements lined up before Richard Donner, husband of producer Lauren Shuler Donner, flew to Australia to ease on-set tensions. Hood remarked, "Out of healthy and sometimes very rigorous debate, things get better. [...] I hope the film's better because of the debates. If nobody were talking about us, we'd be in trouble!" Hood added he and Thomas Rothman were both "forceful" personalities in creative meetings but they had never had a "stand-up" argument. In January 2009, after delays due to weather and scheduling conflicts, such as Hugh Jackman's publicity commitments for Australia, production moved to Vancouver, mostly at Kitsilano Secondary School and in University of British Columbia. Work there included finishing scenes with Ryan Reynolds, who had been working on two other films during principal photography.

Gavin Hood announced that multiple "secret endings" exist for the film and that the endings will differ from print to print of the film. One version shows Wolverine drinking in a Japanese bar. The bartender asks if he is drinking to forget, to which Logan replies that he is drinking to remember. The other ending shows Weapon XI on the rubble of the destroyed tower, trying to touch his severed head.

=== Visual effects ===
More than 1,000 shots of Wolverine have visual effects in them, which required three effects supervisors and 17 different companies to work on the film. The most prominent was Hydraulx, who had also worked in the X-Men trilogy and was responsible for the battle in Three Mile Island and Gambit's powers. Many elements were totally generated through computer-generated imagery, such as the adamantium injection machine, the scene with Gambit's plane and Wolverine tearing through a door with his newly enhanced claws. CGI bone claws were also created for some scenes because the props did not look good in close-ups. Extensive usage of matte paintings was also made, with Matte World Digital creating five different mattes for the final scene of the film—a pullback depicting the destroyed Three Mile Island—and Gavin Hood handing company Hatch Productions pictures of favelas as reference for the Africa scenes.

== Music ==
Composed by Harry Gregson-Williams, the score for X-Men Origins: Wolverine was mixed by Malcolm Luker, engineered by Costa Kotselas, and featured Martin Tillman on the electric cello. Gregson-Williams earlier met Hood during the 63rd Golden Globe Awards dinner party where they were nominated for The Chronicles of Narnia: The Lion, the Witch and the Wardrobe and Tsotsi (both 2005), and the collaborative discussions led him to the initial interest for the film's score. The score was recorded at the Newman Scoring Stage in 20th Century Fox Studios, with Gregson-Williams conducting a 78-piece orchestra and a 40-member vocal choir. Varèse Sarabande released the soundtrack on April 28, 2009.

== Release ==
=== Leaked workprint ===
On March 31, 2009, a full-length DVD-quality workprint of the film without a timecode or watermark, with some unfinished effects shots, a different typeface for titles and casting, and alternate sound effects was leaked online. The studio said it would be able to determine the source of the leak using forensic marks in the workprint. The FBI and MPAA began investigating the illegal posting. Fox estimated the workprint was downloaded roughly 4.5 million times by the time Wolverine was released in theaters. As of 2014, Fox estimates that a minimum of 15 million people downloaded it.

The print contained a reference to Rising Sun Pictures, an Australian visual effects company working on the film. The company denied that they ever had a full copy of the film. In April, Hugh Jackman stated that he was "heartbroken" by the leak, describing it as looking at a Ferrari without paint. Executive producer Thomas Rothman claimed the leaked version lacked the ten minutes added during pick-ups in January 2009. However, the theatrical version of the film has no extra scenes that were not included in the leaked workprint. Both versions run exactly 107 minutes, but director Gavin Hood said "another ending exists that features the film's villain." The original upload was traced to a Bronx man named Gilberto Sanchez, who uploaded it to the site Megaupload in March 2009. According to Sanchez, he bought the unlicensed DVD copy from a Korean man. Sanchez was sentenced to one year in federal prison.

Ted Gagliano, President of Feature Post Production at Fox, later revealed that the leak originated from a preview copy prepared for Rupert Murdoch at short notice with inadequate security.

Roger Friedman, a freelance gossip blogger for Fox News—a channel also owned by Fox's parent company News Corporation—was fired for writing a review of the film using the leaked unfinished copy, which he downloaded from the Internet. He described how easy it was to find and download the film even if the original source of the leak was no longer available on the web. The article he wrote for his column on the Fox News website was immediately removed. Bruce Simmons wrote in Screen Rant: "What was Friedman thinking?" Not only was it foolish for him to review the movie, but then "he bragged" about how easy it was to find and download the pirated version. "When you work for the bank, you should not brag that you stole their money!"

=== Marketing ===
Among the companies which provided tie-in merchandising were 7-Eleven, Papa John's Pizza, and Schick. Hugh Jackman also posed as Wolverine for the Got Milk? campaign. In February 2009, Hasbro released a film-related toyline, featuring action figures and a glove with retractable claws. In April, Marvel debuted a new comic series, Wolverine: Weapon X, which writer Jason Aaron said that while not directly influenced by the film, was written considering people who would get interested in Wolverine comics after watching the film.

In December 2009, Hot Toys released the 12 inch highly detailed figure of Wolverine based on the movie with Hugh Jackman's likeness.

=== Theatrical ===
X-Men Origins: Wolverine was released on April 29, 2009, in the UK, Denmark, South Africa, and Australia; April 30, 2009 in the Philippines and in the Dominican Republic; and May 1, 2009, in the United States and Canada. A contest was held on the official website to determine the location of the world premiere on April 27. In the end, the Harkins at the Tempe Marketplace in Tempe, Arizona won the premiere. The release in Mexico was delayed until the end of May due to an outbreak of H1N1 flu in the country. On April 22, nine days before the release of the film, it was reported that X-Men Origins: Wolverine was outselling Iron Man "3-to-1 at the same point in the sales cycle (nine days prior to the film's release)."

=== Home media ===
On September 15, 2009, 20th Century Fox Home Entertainment released X-Men Origins: Wolverine on DVD and Blu-ray disc. The two-disc Blu-ray includes commentary by Hood, another commentary by producers Lauren Shuler Donner and Ralph Winter, the featurette "The Roots of Wolverine: A Conversation with X-Men creators Stan Lee and Len Wein", the featurette "Wolverine Unleashed: The Complete Origins", 10 character chronicles, two more featurettes, a trivia track, deleted scenes with commentary from Hood, two alternate sequences, a Fox Movie Channel premiere featurette and imdb BD Live technology. Disc two of the set includes a digital copy. In addition, a Wal-Mart exclusive 3-disc set, which includes a standard DVD copy of the film was also released. The two-DVD special edition includes the two commentaries, the featurette with Stan Lee and Len Wein, an origins featurette, deleted and alternate scenes, and an anti-smoking PSA on disc one; disc two has a digital copy of the film. The single-disc DVD release has the origins featurette and anti-smoking PSA.

Wolverine was the highest selling and most rented DVD release of the week, selling over three million copies, 850,000 of them on Blu-ray. Through its first six weeks the DVD has sold 3.79 million copies, generating $64.27 million in sales.

== Reception ==
=== Box office ===
During its first day of wide release, X-Men Origins: Wolverine took in an estimated $35 million, with almost $5 million of that from midnight showings. The earnings placed the film as the 16th highest-grossing opening day ever (22nd with ticket-price inflation). It went on to be number one film at the box office with a total of $85 million. Among summer kick-offs, it ranked fifth behind Spider-Man, X2, Spider-Man 3, and Iron Man and it was in the top ten of comic book adaptations. The opening was lower than the last film in the franchise, X-Men: The Last Stand, as well as X2, but higher than X-Men, the first film in the series.

The worldwide opening was over $158.1 million, but Fox stated that some markets underperformed, mostly due to the leaked workprint in countries with illegal downloading problems. However, in an article for the "piracy issue" of Screen International magazine, film critic John Hazelton was doubtful of this explanation, writing that the film's initial performance was "uncertain" as the outbreak of swine flu in territories with the worst copyright infringement problems means that other territories did not compare at all.

While it received largely unfavorable reviews from critics, the film has been a financial success at the box office. According to Box Office Mojo Wolverine has grossed approximately $179,883,157 in the United States and Canada. It took in another $193,179,707 in other territories, giving it a worldwide total of $373,062,864.

=== Critical response ===
On review aggregation website Rotten Tomatoes the film has an approval rating of 37% based on 258 reviews, with an average rating of 5.1/10. The site's critical consensus reads, "Though Hugh Jackman gives his all, he can't help X-Men Origins: Wolverine overcome a cliche-ridden script and familiar narrative." On Metacritic the film has a score of 40 out of 100, based on reviews from 39 critics, indicating "mixed or average reviews". Audiences polled by CinemaScore gave the film an average grade of "B+" on an A+ to F scale.>

Richard Corliss of TIME commented on the film's standing among other Marvel films, saying that it is "an O.K., not great, Marvel movie that tells the early story of the prime X-Man, and attempts to make it climax in a perfect coupling with the start of the known trilogy." He also said that "superhero mythologies can be so complicated, only a lonely comic-book-reading kid could make sense of it all." James Mullinger of GQ also commented on the structure of the story in saying that the "film clumsily tries to explain the origins of James [Howlett], AKA Wolverine, which had wisely only ever been briefly referred to in the original X-Men saga. In doing so, it creates a fairly bland plot which is full of holes." Peter Rainer of The Christian Science Monitor also praised Jackman's performance, saying that "Hugh Jackman demonstrates that you can segue effortlessly from a tuxedoed song-and-dance man at the Oscars to a feral gent with adamantium claws and berserker rage." Claudia Puig of USA Today considered the movie "well-acted, with spectacular action and witty one-liners".

Roger Ebert gave the film two stars out of four and asked about the title character, "Why should I care about this guy? He feels no pain and nothing can kill him, so therefore he's essentially a story device for action sequences." James Berardinelli gave Wolverine two and a half stars out of four, calling the action scenes competently executed but not memorable, and considering that when dealing with Wolverine's past "there's little creativity evident in the way those blanks are filled in", and that the revelations made Wolverine "less compelling". Comparatively, Bill Gibron of AMC's Filmcritic.com website gave the film a positive "4.0 out of 5 stars," saying that although Hugh Jackman is "capable of carrying even the most mediocre effort, he singlehandedly makes X-Men Origins: Wolverine an excellent start to the summer 2009 season." He predicted "there will be purists who balk at how Hood and his screenwriters mangle and manipulate the mythology;" and further said that "any ending which leaves several characters unexplained and unaccounted for can't really seal the full entertainment deal."

Regarding Wolverine within the context of the X-Men film series, Tom Charity of CNN commented: "Serviceable but inescapably redundant, this Wolverine movie does just enough to keep the X-Men franchise on life support, but the filmmakers will have to come up with some evolutionary changes soon if it's going to escape X-tinction." Similarly, A. O. Scott of The New York Times expressed that "X-Men Origins: Wolverine will most likely manage to cash in on the popularity of the earlier episodes, but it is the latest evidence that the superhero movie is suffering from serious imaginative fatigue." On a more negative note, Philip French of The Observer said that the film's "dull, bone-crushing, special-effects stuff" is "of interest only to hardcore fans who've probably read it all in Marvel comics."

Sukhdev Sandhu of The Daily Telegraph stated that "Wolverine is an artificial stimulus package of the most unsatisfying kind. Aggressively advertised and hyped to the hills, it will no doubt attract full houses at first; after that though, when word-of-mouth buzz-kill goes into overdrive, there's bound to be widespread deflation and a palpable feeling of being conned." Similarly, Orlando Parfitt of IGN UK praised the performances of the actors and the action scenes, but stated that the film felt underdeveloped: "There's an enjoyable time to be had with Wolverine, but it's also somewhat unsatisfying." Furthermore, Scott Mendelson of The Huffington Post gave the film a grade of "D", noting that "Wolverine was the lead character of [the X-Men] films, and we've already learned everything we need to know from the films in said franchise," adding that "the extra information given here actually serves to make the character of Logan/Wolverine less interesting." Steven Rea also felt that the film injured the character by proving that "how the hero acquired his special powers turns out to be a whole lot less interesting than what he does with them", while also being "a mash-up of meaningless combat sequences (meaningless because Logan/Wolverine is just about unstoppable), sub-par visual effects, template backstory, and some goofy Liev Schreiber-as-a-villain thespianizing".

Hugh Jackman later confessed being unhappy with the final result of X-Men Origins: Wolverine. The actor wanted primarily a film that would deepen the Wolverine character, but "somehow the first Wolverine movie ended up looking like the fourth X-Men — just with different characters." He tried to avert the same results while doing the character's next solo film: 2013's The Wolverine.

== Cultural impact ==
Two cases exist of adolescents injecting themselves with elemental mercury after watching X-Men Origins: Wolverine and incorrectly believing this would convert their bones to metal similar to how Wolverine obtains his adamantium skeleton.

== Franchise ==
=== Prequel ===
X-Men Origins: Wolverine was set to be the first of a series of X-Men Origins prequels, with the next being focused on Erik Lensherr / Magneto. However, this entered development hell and was eventually cancelled, with elements instead being incorporated in X-Men: First Class (2011).

=== Sequels ===
A second Wolverine film, titled The Wolverine (2013), was set years after X-Men: The Last Stand (2006) as a standalone sequel. X-Men: Days of Future Past (2014) was confirmed to erase the events of X-Men Origins: Wolverine through retroactive continuity. A third Wolverine film titled Logan was released on March 3, 2017. At one point, Schreiber was discussed as being in talks to reprise his role in Logan.

=== Spin-off series ===
The spin-off film Deadpool (2016) and its sequel Deadpool 2 (2018) feature Ryan Reynolds reprising his role as Deadpool, albeit in a more faithful depiction of the comics. Several jokes in both films are aimed at X-Men Origins: Wolverine due to the negative reaction to Weapon XI's portrayal in the film. A mid-credits scene in Deadpool 2 depicts Deadpool traveling backwards in time to the events of this film, X-Men Origins: Wolverine, to unceremoniously kill the widely criticized interpretation of the character, Weapon XI. The scene was pulled off using archival footage of Jackman from the film and with the help of stand-ins.

=== Marvel Cinematic Universe ===
Reynolds and Jackman eventually appeared together again as their respective characters in the Marvel Cinematic Universe film Deadpool & Wolverine (2024), where Reynolds reprises his role from the spin-off Deadpool series of the franchise, while Jackman portrays a Wolverine "variant" in a comic-accurate yellow-suit as the co-lead, along with multiple alternate "variants" of Logan from the multiverse. Sabretooth appears in the movie, notably called Wolverine's "brother", a plot point first showcased in this movie. Schreiber doesn't return to portray the character; instead, Tyler Mane reprises the role from X-Men (2000). Gambit appears in the movie as well, depicted in a more comic-accurate look with a Cajun accent unlike this movie's incarnation of the character. Kitsch doesn't reprise the role; instead Channing Tatum portrays the character, who was attached to star in an unproduced Gambit film in the X-Men film series.

== Video game ==
Raven Software developed a video game based on the film with the same name, which Activision published. Marc Guggenheim wrote the script, while Hugh Jackman, Liev Schreiber, and will.i.am voiced their characters from the film. The storyline goes beyond the one from the film, including other villains from the comics such as the Sentinels and the Wendigo, as well as the appearance of Mystique, who was in the other three X-Men films.
