= Man-Elephant =

Man-Elephant is the name of two fictional characters appearing in American comic books published by Marvel Comics.

== Publication history ==
The first Man-Elephant first appeared in The Savage She-Hulk #17 and was created by David Anthony Kraft and Ed Hannigan.

The second Man-Elephant first appeared in The Sensational She-Hulk #51 and was created by Scott Benson, Tom Morgan, and Brad Joyce.

== Fictional character biography ==
=== Manfred Ellsworth Haller ===
Man-Elephant

Publication information
- Publisher: Marvel Comics
- First appearance: The Savage She-Hulk #17 (June 1983)
- Created by: David Anthony Kraft; Ed Hannigan

In-story information
- Full name: Manfred Ellsworth Haller
- Notable aliases: Behemoth
- Abilities: (As Man-Elephant): Elephant-themed suit grants: Superhuman strength (As Behemoth): Superhuman strength and durability

Manfred Ellsworth Haller is the designer and owner of Haller Hydraulics, which is boasted as the world leader in hydraulics. Haller designs a powerful elephant-like suit that would enable someone to explore hostile areas and offers Sheriff Morris Walters a chance to prove its worth by capturing She-Hulk. Haller believes that his ensuing publicity would endorse the suit. Drawing She-Hulk into action, Man-Elephant proves more than a match for her. However, he backs off after realizing that he could use the suit for crime.

Manfred Haller is put out of business by Tony Stark and his assets are frozen. He travels to Timbuktu, where a wise woman tells him about Ganesha and gives him a gem shard from Cyttorak. This transforms Haller into Behemoth, an elephant-like creature. As Behemoth, Haller defends the locals from Tuareg rebels.

Behemoth tracks down She-Hulk to take revenge on her. However, She-Hulk had been imprisoned after helping the Lady Liberators oust the corrupt government of Marinmer. She-Hulk's Skrull partner Jazinda poses as her and is beaten up by Behemoth. Behemoth turns Jazinda over to the government, who place her in a military medical facility to be studied. Behemoth then attacks the real She-Hulk, only to be attacked by Thundra. Jazinda escapes as She-Hulk defeats Behemoth.

Strong Guy fights Behemoth in New York City, where their fight leads them to New York City's main switching station. Strong Guy defeats Behemoth by knocking him into the relays at the switching station, causing a city-wide blackout.

=== Second Man-Elephant ===
Man-Elephant

Publication information
- Publisher: Marvel Comics
- First appearance: The Sensational She-Hulk #51 (May 1993)
- Created by: Scott Benson; Tom Morgan; Brad Joyce

In-story information
- Abilities: Genius-level intellect

The second Man-Elephant was created by the publishers and distributors of the in-universe company Marvel Comics, who exaggerated She-Hulk's encounter with the original Man-Elephant. Through unknown means, these fictionalized versions of She-Hulk and Man-Elephant are brought to life and confront the real She-Hulk. Man-Elephant acquires technology that allows him to transform elephants into humanoid forms to serve him. Even with their mutation, the Man-Elephants retain their docile behavior and are confused over their transformations. Inciting them into violence, the Man-Elephant leads the elephants against the She-Hulk doppelganger and defeats her. The real She-Hulk appears and returns Man-Elephant and the second She-Hulk to their universe.

== Powers and abilities ==
Manfred used an elephant-themed suit which boosted his strength. He later gained a part of the Cyttorak gem, which turns him into the elephant-like creature known as Behemoth, possessing superhuman strength and durability.

The second Man-Elephant has no powers, aside from being a humanoid elephant and possessing a devious nefarious mind.
