= Arsenal (comics) =

Arsenal (comics) may refer to:

== DC Comics ==
- Nicholas Galtry, a villain who first appeared in Doom Patrol #100, December 1965 (as a civilian) and Tales of the New Teen Titans #3, August 1982 (as Arsenal)
- Arsenal, a villain who first appeared in Doom Patrol #113 (August 1967)
- Arsenal, a villain who first appeared in Adventure Comics #485 (September 1981)
- Arsenal, an alias used by Roy Harper

== Marvel Comics ==
- Arsenal (Marvel Comics), a villain who first appeared in Iron Man #114
