= Origin (comics) =

Marvel comic book series

- Origin No. 1 Cover, art by Joe Quesada and Richard Isanove.

Publication information
- Publisher: Marvel Comics
- Schedule: Monthly
- Format: Limited series
- Genre: Superhero
- Publication date: November 2001 – July 2002
- No. of issues: 6
- Main character(s): Logan/James Howlett; Rose O'Hara

Creative team
- Written by: Bill Jemas (plot); Paul Jenkins (plot/script); Joe Quesada (plot)
- Artist(s): Andy Kubert; Richard Isanove

Origin (alternatively known as Wolverine: Origin or Origin: The True Story of Wolverine) is a six-issue comic book limited series published by Marvel Comics from November 2001 to July 2002, written by Bill Jemas, Joe Quesada and Paul Jenkins, and illustrated by Andy Kubert (pencils) and Richard Isanove (color).

Origin tells the story of the superhero Wolverine, best known as a member of the X-Men. Since the character first appeared in the early 1970s his history had often been shrouded in mystery, with bits of information revealed piecemeal over time (notably in Weapon X), but this series was the first to reveal Wolverine's early days and his original background.

== Plot ==
In 19th-century Canada, Rose, a young girl who recently lost both her parents, is employed at the manor of the Howletts, a family of rich plantation owners. There, Rose is tasked with tacking care of the family's youngest son, James Howlett, a sickly child who suffers from constant illnesses and allergies. James misses the presence of his mother, Elizabeth Howlett, who- after the death of her eldest son- has shut herself inside her room. Rose meets the rest of the staff, as well as James' father, John, who remains kind and caring to his servants despite his father's disapproval.

Rose is warned to stay away from the Howletts' violent groundskeeper Thomas Logan, however both James and Rose enjoy playing with Logan's son, who all the servants in the estate simply call "Dog". The children's friendship is spoiled by the tension between the boys' fathers centering on Elizabeth. Rose later stumbles upon Elizabeth changing, and sees that she has three parallel scars along her ribs.

James Howlett first uses his claws in Origin #2.

As a result of beatings and alcohol, Dog, over the next few years, becomes increasingly like his father, and his misdeeds, including an attempted assault on Rose and the killing of James' dog, become so violent that he and his father are expelled from the manor. Thomas returns for the purpose of robbing the Howlett estate and to convince Elizabeth to leave with him (it is implied that they had an affair and that Thomas may be the biological father of Elizabeth's sons).

John Howlett enters the bedroom after hearing noises. Thomas kills John Howlett with a shotgun in front of all three children and Elizabeth. The horror of his father's death causes James' powers to manifest for the first time, and he uses his claws to kill Thomas and injure Dog, before lapsing into shock. Elizabeth tells James "Not you too" (implying that something similar had happened to his deceased brother), rejecting him with disgust. James escapes and Rose follows him. Meanwhile, Elizabeth, surprisingly, cradles the body of Thomas Logan rather than that of her husband. After a few moments, with her shallow grip on reality shattered, she picks up Thomas' shotgun and kills herself in front of Dog.

Questioned by the police, Dog accuses Rose of the killings and the fact that she fled the scene with James appears to confirm this. James is still in shock and appears to have no recollection of what happened. This loss of memory is due to Wolverine's/James' healing factor which, in effect, "healed" (by putting up a mental block) the mentally devastating traumas of witnessing his father's death, the confusion at his mother's anger towards him and the pain and surprise caused by the sudden manifestation of his claws.

Rose seeks help from her aunt, her only relative, who rejects her saying that she had stopped being family when she chose to live with the Howletts. James' grandfather then drives them both away from the house due to the manifestation of James' powers, mentioning he has had to deal with this sort of thing before. They are given some money and take the train from Alberta to British Columbia, where they are given work in a stone quarry by the foreman, Smitty. Rose claims that her male companion is her cousin and, since they are on the run, calls him Logan to conceal his identity; though why she should choose the name of their enemy remains unexplained.

Over several years James/Logan strengthens physically, to the point where he no longer resembles the sickly child he had been, although his memory is still shattered. He often goes into the woods to hunt game, typically among a pack of wolves. He quickly becomes the head of the pack, and begins using his claws to hunt. He turns down Rose's offers to tell him about his past, and reacts angrily when the subject comes up. She therefore keeps detailed notes in her diary.

James begins to become close to Smitty, who, in turn, develops romantic feelings toward Rose, which she returns. He courts her with books, including poetry by William Blake and a history of the samurai (warriors whom Wolverine of the X-Men would later model himself after). Logan's public identity as her cousin makes it impossible for him to declare his own feelings for her. He seems to deal with his feelings by working hard at the quarry, and is given the nickname Wolverine by the local population, who compare his intense digging to a wolverine going after a root. He also develops a feud with the camp's obese cook, "Cookie" Malone, who goes out of his way to cause trouble for Logan from the time he and Rose arrive. After years of enduring Malone's abuses, Logan eventually gives him a beating after the cook provokes an explosion in the quarry and kills many workers in the process.

Smitty eventually asks Rose to marry him, which she accepts, and Smitty informs her that the cage fights are a fast and easy way to earn some extra money. He asks her to leave with him, which she is reluctant to do because of Logan. Logan sees Rose kissing Smitty and, feeling betrayed, later confronts her and confesses his feelings to her, though she rejects him for Smitty after he turns down her offer for him to go with them. Just before the couple leaves to be wed, Dog comes to the bar, originally sent by Old Man Howlett, on his deathbed, to find his heir. Logan works out his violence in a series of cage fights, and confronts Smitty at the last cage fight after venting his fury on Malone, and quickly has him at his mercy. Despite mixed feelings, Logan wishes Rose to be happy and allows Smitty to defeat him purposely. After the last cage fight, Dog confronts Logan. Dog blames Logan for the events that led to his father's death and is actually there for revenge. In the ensuing fight, Logan gives Dog a beating, but as he is about to kill him, Rose is accidentally impaled on Logan's claws. Logan goes mad with grief (his healing factor throwing up another mental block due to accidentally killing his first love) and runs into the woods, where he stays for an as yet unknown amount of time, living like a wild animal. Smitty attempts to find him during this period and tries to bring him back to humanity, but fails as Logan no longer wishes to be found.

Logan would not let Rose tell him about his past, which he had forgotten anyway. Malone steals Rose's few belongings, and spitefully burns her diary which contains the truth of Logan's past.

== Themes ==
Psychologist Suzana E. Flores argues that the narrative depicts complex childhood trauma and its effects, including dissociative amnesia and hypervigilance. Among other causes, Logan's mother shows traits of a "consciously absent mother" partly as the result of the loss of her first child prior to his birth, and this led her to be "unable to conceptualize caring for another child."

== Production ==
For decades, Wolverine's origins had been a mystery. After the success of the first X-Men film, it was decided that if the character's origin was not told in the comic, it would be told on the film.

Paul Jenkins wanted certain characters, artwise and relationship-wise, to resonate with those knowledgeable about Wolverine's character history. Smitty was supposed to look somewhat like Cyclops, and his relationship with Jean Grey lookalike Rose to be what sparks Wolverine's jealousy in his fictional future. Similarly, Dog was to be a representation of Sabretooth, Wolverine's greatest nemesis.

When an interviewer asked Jenkins whether the character of Wolverine's half-brother Dog Logan was Sabretooth, Jenkins replied that he had not intended it to be him, but said he would not have a problem with another writer doing it later. In April 2009, Marvel Comics released a one-shot specialty comic entitled X-Men Origins: Sabretooth, which was part of a series of origin stories for a number of other X-Men characters. The comic chronicled some of Sabretooth's earliest childhood experiences. Within the comic, it is revealed that Sabretooth's childhood and early life, with the exception of being in an abusive family, differs distinctly from the life of Dog as shown in the Origin mini-series. The feature films X-Men Origins: Wolverine and Deadpool & Wolverine would consequently depict Sabretooth as being Wolverine's half-brother.

== Sales ==
The final issue No. 6 of Origin was ranked second in sales for the January 2002 period with pre-order sales of 166,997.

== Sequel ==
At 2013 San Diego Comic-Con, Marvel announced a sequel to the original limited series titled Origin II. Written by Kieron Gillen with art by Adam Kubert, brother of original artist Andy Kubert, the first issue was released in December 2013.

== In other media ==
The prologue of the film X-Men Origins: Wolverine is partially inspired by Origin, where James Howlett in 19th-century Canada discovers his mutant powers after his father's murder and Victor Creed is Logan's half brother.

In the video game X-Men Origins: Wolverine, a trivia caption on the loading screens says Victor Creed's nickname as a boy was "Dog".

== Collected editions ==
Title	Material collected	Published date	ISBN
Wolverine: Origin	Origin #1–6	March 2009	978-0785137276
Wolverine: Origin II	Origin II #1–5	March 2015	978-0785190325
Wolverine: Origin – The Complete Collection	Origin #1–6, Origin II #1–5	January 2017	978-1302904715
