= Richard and Mary Parker =

Fictional characters in Marvel Comics

- Richard and Mary Parker as seen in the interior artwork from Spider-Man: Back in Black TPB (February 2008), art by John Romita, Sr.

Publication information
- First appearance: Cameo appearance: The Amazing Spider-Man Annual #5 (November 1968); Full appearance: Untold Tales of Spider-Man #1 (May 1997)
- Created by: Stan Lee; Larry Lieber

In-story information
- Full name: Richard Laurence Parker; Mary Teresa Parker (née Fitzpatrick)
- Place of origin: Queens, New York
- Team affiliations: Central Intelligence Agency; S.H.I.E.L.D.
- Supporting character of: Peter Parker (son); Teresa Parker (daughter)

Richard and Mary Parker are characters appearing in American comic books published by Marvel Comics. They are the parents of Peter Parker, the superhero known as Spider-Man, and Teresa Parker, a S.H.I.E.L.D. agent.

Richard and Mary Parker have been adapted to appear in several animated television series and video games. Campbell Scott and Embeth Davidtz portrayed the characters in the films The Amazing Spider-Man (2012) and The Amazing Spider-Man 2 (2014). Emma Roberts portrayed Mary Parker in the Sony's Spider-Man Universe film Madame Web (2024), and Josh Keaton voiced Richard Parker in the Marvel Cinematic Universe animated series Your Friendly Neighborhood Spider-Man (2025).

== Publication history ==
Richard and Mary Parker were created by Stan Lee and Larry Lieber. For many years before The Amazing Spider-Man Annual #5 (November 1968), there had been no explanation of why Peter Parker was being raised by his aunt and uncle, with his parents only appearing in flashbacks and photographs. That issue finally answered the question: Richard and Mary Parker were murdered by Albert Malik, who was one of Johann Schmidt's successors as the persona of Red Skull.

In The Amazing Spider-Man #365 (August 1992), Spider-Man's 30th anniversary, they reappeared. Two years later, however, in #388 (April 1994), they were revealed to be Life Model Decoys created by the Chameleon and were destroyed.

In the novel Mary Jane, it is stated that the Parkers died in a plane accident while going to Switzerland to turn in some important discovery that Richard made. Peter tries to figure out what the discovery was but fails, as he cannot figure out the things Richard has written on his board. In July 1997, Untold Tales of Spider-Man #−1, part of Marvel Comics' "Flashback Month" event, written by Roger Stern and drawn by John Romita, Sr., the characters' origins are expanded. Since then, they have rarely been mentioned.

== Fictional character biographies ==
Captain Richard Parker, a decorated soldier of the United States Army Special Forces and younger brother of Ben Parker, was recruited by Nick Fury, the future director of S.H.I.E.L.D., to the C.I.A.

Mary Fitzpatrick was the daughter of O.S.S. agent "Wild Will" Fitzpatrick. She attended the best schools and eventually followed in her father's footsteps, becoming a C.I.A. translator and data analyst.

Richard and Mary met on the job, fell in love, and married. Originally they eloped, later having a more elaborate service, fooling many. Mary became a field agent like Richard, giving them both an easy cover as a married couple. They were assigned to investigate Baroness Adelicia Von Krupp, who had captured Logan, an agent of a "friendly power". They rescued Logan from Krupp and Baron Strucker. After that mission, they discovered Mary was pregnant. Their son, Peter, was often left in the care of Ben and his wife May when Richard and Mary were away on missions.

While on a mission to investigate Albert Malik, the third Red Skull, the Parkers pose as traitors and double agents to infiltrate his criminal organization in Algeria, ultimately being discovered. Malik has an assassin kill the two by sabotaging their airplane and causing it to crash, and they are declared missing in action by the government, as two burnt bodies are found in the remains. Following the death of his parents, Peter is raised by Ben and May.

=== After death ===
Richard and Mary's son, Peter, grew up to become Spider-Man. Although he has only vague memories of his parents and no memory of their militaristic history, his aunt and uncle share photographs and happy memories with him, but not their belief that they had been traitors to their country. When Peter discovers this, he travels to Algeria and encounters Malik, who sends the Finisher to kill Spider-Man. Spider-Man learns that his parents are innocent and returns to the United States with evidence to clear their names.

Richard and Mary Parker later were revealed to have a daughter named Teresa Parker, Peter's younger sister.

=== Life Model Decoys ===
Years after the disappearance of Peter's parents—but well before Peter's discovery of Teresa—the Chameleon, at the direction of Harry Osborn, the second Green Goblin, created Life Model Decoys (LMDs) of Richard and Mary—near-perfect robotic replicas. Since the plane-crash bodies were apparently burnt beyond recognition, Osborn and the Chameleon are able to use the LMDs to fool the State Department, Peter, and Aunt May into believing that Richard and Mary were forced out the plane in mid-air by Russian spies—two of whom, it was argued, died in their place—and that they then spent most of Peter's life “lost” in the Soviet Union’s prison system until the dissolution of the Soviet Union, when they were “discovered” and set free.

Peter is suspicious until a series of apparent revelations seem to confirm their story. Aunt May also becomes suspicious, as there were things known only to Peter's real parents that the LMDs appear not to know. When, as Spider-Man, Peter discovers that the LMDs are imposters, the decoys are ordered to attack him, but the Mary duplicate—having developed love for her “son”—saves him instead; neither LMD ultimately survives. After battling the Chameleon, Spider-Man discovers that his recently-dead best friend—Harry Osborn—was behind the whole thing, as an effort to avenge his dead father Norman Osborn.

== Other versions ==
=== Bullet Points ===
Alternate universe versions of Richard and Mary Parker make a minor appearance in Bullet Points #1.

=== Marvel Mangaverse ===
An alternate universe version of Mary Parker named Kiri appears in Marvel Mangaverse: Spider-Man. This version is a spider demon called the Spider Queen and the leader of the Spider Clan. She initially attempts to name her son, Peter, her successor until he rejects the position. Nonetheless, she appoints her pupil Venom instead.

=== Trouble ===
Characters based on Richard and Mary Parker appear in Trouble, a non-canon story following young versions of Richard, Mary, May, and Ben.

=== Ultimate Marvel ===
Alternate universe versions of Richard and Mary Parker from Earth-1610 appears in the Ultimate Marvel imprint. The former, also known as "Ray Parker", was a biologist who worked with Eddie Brock Sr. on a biological suit capable of repairing the host's body that would go on to become Venom as well as Hank Pym, Franklin Storm, and Bruce Banner in an attempt to recreate the super-soldier serum. Additionally, Richard and Mary were severely injured amidst an explosion. Artist Mark Bagley based Richard Parker's likeness on that of Peter Parker as drawn by John Romita Sr. and Gil Kane in the late 1960s and early 1970s, feeling he had not captured Peter's appearance during his earlier run on The Amazing Spider-Man in the 1990s.

=== Spider-Geddon ===
Alternate universe versions of Richard and Mary Parker from Earth-83043 appear in the Spider-Geddon tie-in Vault of Spiders #1. In this version of events, the Parkers took their son Peter with them on a plane provided by Wilson Fisk, who rigged it to crash. After Richard and Mary were killed when the plane crashed in the Savage Land, Peter was adopted by giant spiders and went on to become the Savage Spider-Man.

== In other media ==
=== Television ===
- Richard and Mary Parker make non-speaking appearances in the Spider-Man: The Animated Series episode "Doctor Strange".
- Richard Parker appears in the Your Friendly Neighborhood Spider-Man episode "If This Be My Destiny...", voiced by Josh Keaton. This version is still alive and incarcerated for an unknown crime.

=== Film ===
- Richard and Mary Parker appear in The Amazing Spider-Man and The Amazing Spider-Man 2, portrayed by Campbell Scott and Embeth Davidtz respectively. Richard was a former Oscorp employee who used his DNA to create genetically-engineered spiders and left the company to prevent his work from being used as biological weapons.
- Mary Parker appears in Madame Web, portrayed by Emma Roberts.

=== Video games ===
Richard and Mary Parker appear in Ultimate Spider-Man, with Richard voiced by Loren Lester while Mary has no dialogue.

=== Miscellaneous ===
- Richard and Mary Parker appear in the Sinister Six novel trilogy, by Adam-Troy Castro. These versions previously worked with Logan through joint missions between the American and Canadian secret services. Additionally, the Gentleman partially contributed to their deaths by exposing the Parkers' identities to the Red Skull in retaliation for them foiling one of the former's schemes.
- Richard and Mary Parker appear in the novel What If... Wanda Maximoff and Peter Parker Were Siblings?. These versions adopted an infant Wanda Maximoff when they discovered her in an abandoned research facility while on a mission.
