= Marville (comics) =

2002 Marvel comic book series

- Cover of Marville #1; Art by Mark D. Bright

Publication information
- Publisher: Marvel Comics
- Format: Limited series
- Genre: Superhero
- Publication date: 2002–2003
- No. of issues: 7

Creative team
- Written by: Bill Jemas

Marville is a 2002 comic book limited series published by American company Marvel Comics. The series was written by Bill Jemas, and the stories involve satirical comments on comic book industry conventions and trends.

== Plot ==
In the year 5002, Ted Turner and Jane Fonda have a son named Kal-AOL (a pun on Kal-El), whom they send back in time to the year 2002 to save him when they believe a meteor strike will destroy the Earth. Kal-AOL, now known as Al, attempts to become a superhero, despite his lack of superpowers, and becomes friends with a cab driver named Mickey and a police officer named Lucy. Although Al becomes rich and famous for capturing criminals, he is upset that crime is still rampant. In the year 5002, the world is not actually destroyed, and Ted Turner sends the time machine back to Al so he can come home. Instead, Al uses the time machine to travel to the dawn of creation and meet God, so he can determine the meaning of life and the nature of morality so he can be a proper hero.

At the dawn of time they meet a man named Jack, who is ambiguous as to if he is actually God or not. Jack takes them through the creation of life on Earth and then to the Jurassic period, and then to the evolution of the first human beings as nomadic hunter-gatherers led by Wolverine, the first human being. Along the way, Jack discusses with them the means behind which life evolved in this manner and why, among other philosophical concepts, and the characters come to the conclusion that God is responsible for engineering life and guiding its evolution. Jack explains he is showing them these events because World War III is going to happen, and he wants them to understand the nature of war so they can work to prevent it.

In the year 2003, Al pitches his story to the head of an unspecified comics company, framed as a recap of the events of the comic (though several things Al mentions did not occur in previous issues in the manner he claims). The unseen editor likes the story, but refuses to turn it into a comic because he believes it will not sell to mainstream audiences. Issue #6 ends with an open letter from Jemas discussing his experiences with publishing the comic and announcing the creation of a new Marvel imprint, Epic Comics; issue #7 does not actually contain any story content related to the events of Marville and is a submissions guideline book for creators on how to submit their work to Epic Comics.

== U-Decide ==
Marville was created as part of Marvel's U-Decide promotional campaign, in which fans would decide which of three books would survive. The event involved one existing book (Peter David's Captain Marvel, whose numbering was restarted at issue #1) and two new books (Marville and Ron Zimmerman's Ultimate Adventures), and was based around a bet between David and Jemas, of which Marvel editor-in-chief Joe Quesada later became a part. Jemas changed the stakes of the bet a few issues into Marville, stating that the loser would take a pie in the face for charity. Despite this, both Marville and Ultimate Adventures ended fairly quickly, while the rebooted Captain Marvel would last 25 more issues, for a total of 60 issues when combined with the first run.

== Reception ==
For its confusing plot, wanton sexuality, and thinly veiled promotional nature, Marville was universally panned by critics, and is regularly referred to as one of the worst comics of all time.

ComicsAlliance included Marville in their list of the 15 Worst Comics of the Decade, calling it little more than a "publicity stunt", and Rob Bricken of io9 likened the work to "shooting heroin directly into your adrenal gland."

Screen Rant ranked Kal-AOL (and the rest of the Marville cast) as one of the "superheroes that Marvel wants you to forget."

The A.V. Club called it "abominable", "nearly unpublishable", and — despite its professional-quality production values — "fundamentally amateurish", condemning Jemas for using the Marvel corporation as "a vanity press for himself".
