= Dirk Deppey =

American male journalist

Dirk Deppey is a comics journalist and critic. He is best known as the writer of The Comics Journal's news blog Journalista!. He was managing editor of The Comics Journal from 2004 to 2006.

== Career ==
Deppey spent almost twelve years in a number of graphic-related jobs in Arizona and for two years he was in charge of websites for a sporting newspaper, which he did not enjoy. He later worked for Fantagraphics in early 1999 for over ten years. After working for Journalista! for four years, Deppey was laid off from The Comics Journal in December 2010.
