= Mahkizmo =

- Mahkizmo as depicted in Captain Marvel (vol. 10) #1 (January 2019). Art by Carmen Carnero (penciler/inker) and Tamra Bonvillain (colorist).

Publication information
- Publisher: Marvel Comics
- First appearance: Fantastic Four #151 (October 1974)
- Created by: Gerry Conway; Rich Buckler

In-story information
- Alter ego: Mahkizmo
- Team affiliations: Men of Machus
- Notable aliases: The Nuclear Man
- Abilities: Superhuman strength and durability; Energy projection

Mahkizmo, also known as the Nuclear Man, is a fictional character appearing in American comic books published by Marvel Comics. As his name suggests, he is an extreme male chauvinist.

== Publication history ==
Mahkizmo first appeared in Fantastic Four #151 (October 1974), and was created by writer Gerry Conway and artist Rich Buckler. He is the enemy of Thundra, herself a character meant to symbolize extreme feminism.

The character subsequently appears in The Sensational She-Hulk #34 (December 1991), #38-39 (April–May 1992), Fantastic Four: Foes #1 (March 2005), #5-6 (July–August 2005).

Mahkizmo received an entry in the Marvel Legacy: The 1970s Handbook #1 (2006).

== Fictional character biography ==
Mahkizmo is the ruler of Machus, a world in an alternate 23rd century where men enslaved women. His timeline is the thematic opposite of Thundra's world of Femizonia, where women subjugated men. After Thundra travels to the 20th century of Earth-616 to change the past and prevent Machus from existing, Mahkizmo is sent to stop her. Mahkizmo battles the Fantastic Four before teleporting Thundra back to Machus. Once there, Mahkizmo imprisons Thundra and saps her will using an energy beam.

When the Fantastic Four confront him, Mahkizmo manages to stop them and capture Medusa. However, Medusa entrances Mahkizmo and knocks him out before escaping. Mahkizmo sentences Thundra and the Fantastic Four to death in a gladiatorial arena, fighting them himself when they defeat his champions. As Mahkizmo defeats them all, Medusa arrives with Thundra's Femizons, who battle the Machans. Thundra and the Thing punch Mahkizmo at the same time, causing an energy implosion that destroys his body. This causes the barriers between Machus and Femizonia to dissolve, with the two worlds merging.

Mahkizmo survives the implosion as an intangible and invisible entity, and is angered that the people of the merged world are living peacefully. He takes over the body of one of the new world's men, which he transforms to resemble his original body. Mahkizmo travels to the 20th century and planned to kill every woman in the past to keep the worlds from merging. Mahkizmo attacks She-Hulk until Cupid shoots him with an arrow that causes him to fall in love with She-Hulk instead. He takes She-Hulk back to his world to make her his bride, but is thwarted by her and the Thing.

Mahkizmo is among the Fantastic Four's enemies who meet with the Puppet Master to propose an alliance. The Fantastic Four are able to capture Mahkizmo and transfer him to Negative Zone Prison Alpha. Mahkizmo, along with the other inmates, is freed by the sorceress Threska, only to be stopped by the Fantastic Four and returned to his cell.

Mahkizmo later battles Captain Marvel when she is transported to an apocalyptic version of Roosevelt Island.
