= Bill Jemas =

American media entrepreneur, writer and editor

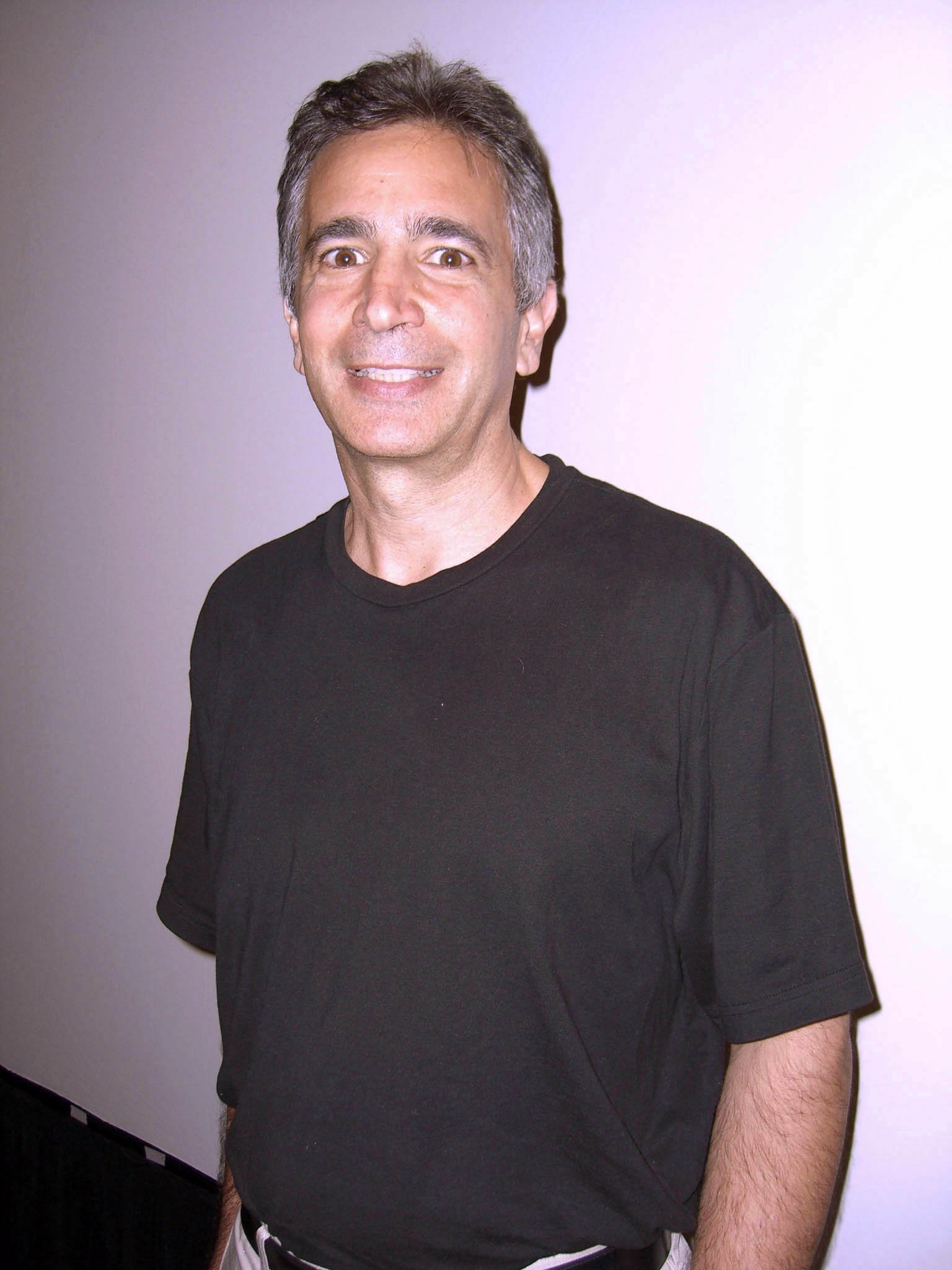
- Jemas at the Big Apple Convention in Manhattan, October 2, 2010
- Areas: Writer; Editor
- Notable works: Ultimate Marvel Universe; Marville; Origin

Bill Jemas (/ˈdʒɛməs/) is an American media entrepreneur, writer, and editor, known for his tenure as president of Fleer Entertainment Group during the 1990s, and for his work as vice president of Marvel Comics from 2000 to 2004. During his time at Marvel, Jemas and editor-in-chief Joe Quesada implemented Marvel's no-overship policy, newsstand compilation magazines, added the Marvel MAX line, fortified the Marvel Knights imprint, removed the Comics Code from Marvel books, increased Marvel's publication of trade paperbacks, and were credited with shepherding the company from bankruptcy to profit, earning positive reviews from within and outside of the comics industry. However, Jemas also was criticized for micromanagement and provocative public statements that made him a controversial figure.

== Early life ==
Jemas was raised in a Roman Catholic household. In 1980, he received a Bachelor of Arts degree from Rutgers University, where he majored in history and minored in philosophy and economics. In 1983 he graduated from Harvard Law School with a Juris Doctor.

== Career ==
After graduating Harvard, Jemas took a job as a tax attorney at Simpson Thacher & Bartlett in New York. Disappointed by this work, he left after two years to work for the National Basketball Association, which he found to be more entrepreneurial, and allowed him to focus on managing a business and working on deals, which Jemas sees as two of the things he does best. It also gave him entry into the entertainment field, which he felt would open up lucrative opportunities. While at NBA, according to Jemas, he helped build an almost non-existent basketball card business into a multimillion-dollar enterprise.

Jemas became president of Fleer Entertainment Group and Fleer Corp in 1993, and appointed Jemas as executive vice president of Marvel Entertainment Group that year. In January 2000, he became president of consumer products, publishing and new media—essentially Marvel Comics' publisher. During his tenure, his tendencies toward micromanagement and provocative public statements made him a controversial figure.

He came to prominence at Marvel Comics (which owned Fleer), during the former's bankruptcy reorganizations. During his tenure, Jemas was key in replacing editor-in-chief Bob Harras with Joe Quesada. Jemas and Quesada formed the public face of Marvel, taking the roles of, said one observer, of "good cop and bad cop". Among the policies they implemented were Marvel's no-overship policy, newsstand compilation magazines, adding the Marvel MAX line, entrenching Marvel Knights, and removal of the Comics Code from Marvel books. They also increased Marvel's publication of trade paperbacks, and are credited with shepherding the company from bankruptcy to profit, and with earning positive reviews from within and outside of the comics industry.

Other later initiatives include titles such as Trouble, The Call and Marville, the last of which was Jemas's entry in the U-Decide competition with Quesada and Peter David.

Jemas and Quesada's partnership would eventually suffer amid controversy generated by Jemas, which Marvel executives frowned upon, and which resulted in Quesada distancing himself from Jemas in the eyes of Marvel staff and freelancers. During this time, Jemas spearheaded the revival of the company's Epic line, which would publish creator-owned books, but his interference in editorial generated much ill will among creators who felt his ideas did not help the quality of the books. Producer and Marvel Studios CEO Avi Arad in particular was angered over certain comics overseen by Jemas that Arad had difficulty selling to Hollywood producers and stars. As the company's film properties grew in importance, Jemas lost the loyalty of Arad's business partner, Isaac Perlmutter, who had been instrumental in bringing Marvel out of bankruptcy through the merger of his company, Toy Biz.

Upon his departure from the company, Jemas continued to work with Marvel in a non-executive capacity through mid-2004, writing or co-writing Marvel comic books including Namor and Origin.

Comic book writer Gail Simone said on her blog that she ghost wrote for Jemas during his tenure at Marvel. She later clarified that she was referring to a comedic article about Marvel giving away free cookies rather than an actual comic.

Upon his departure from Marvel Entertainment, Jemas started 360ep, an entertainment property management firm. He developed the Freeware Bible, which translates ancient Aramaic-Hebrew words into English synonyms, for the purpose of providing an English translation of Genesis that is truer to the original Hebrew text than commonly used translations like the King James Bible, and to "show readers that widely accepted Bible translations are inherently imperfect". By February 2009, he had completed the first chapter. Jemas also managed a T-shirt line, IDtees, whose T-shirts contained positive messages. The line was eventually discontinued so that Jemas could focus on other projects.

In 2012, Jemas announced the creation of an online comics venture, the Transverse Universe. A new print comic, Wake the F#CK Up, was released December 4, 2012 via Zenescope Comics. The promotion of the comic was spearheaded with a YouTube video by hip-hop artist Kilgorian Tralfamadore.

In December 2013, Jemas joined Take-Two Interactive to start a graphic fiction imprint, Double Take Comics. Double Take Comics closed in November 2016.

In 2019, Jemas joined the new comic book publisher Artists, Writers and Artisans, or AWA Studios an initiative created by former Marvel editor-in-chief Axel Alonso, on which Jemas would serve as chief creative officer. The publisher announced that its first slate of titles would include books by creators such as Peter Milligan, Frank Cho, and Christa Faust. One of its early publications was The Resistance, a miniseries by J. Michael Straczynski and Mike Deodato, which depicts a global pandemic caused by a pathogen that kills 95 percent of those infected, leaving the remaining five percent with superhuman abilities. The series, which was intended to establish a new superhero universe, debuted on March 18, 2020, as the COVID-19 pandemic was taking hold in the United States. The series garnered positive reviews, achieved a rating of 8.9 out of 10 at the review aggregator website Comic Book Roundup, based on 24 reviews.

== Personal life ==
Jemas's wife is Jewish. They both attend the Reconstructionist synagogue in Princeton.
