= Ultimate Adventures =

Comic book

- Cover to Ultimate Adventures #1. Art by Kaare Andrews.

Publication information
- Publisher: Marvel Comics
- Schedule: monthly
- Format: miniseries
- Publication date: September 2002 to January 2004
- No. of issues: 6
- Main character: See Characters

Creative team
- Written by: Ron Zimmerman
- Artist: Duncan Fegredo

Ultimate Adventures was a six-issue comic book, written by Ron Zimmerman and drawn by Duncan Fegredo, and published by Marvel Comics. It starred Hawk-Owl and Woody, two characters who were designed by Howard Stern Show staff member Ralph Cirella as blatant parodies of Batman and Robin. At the time of its publication, it was the only Ultimate title to introduce characters who were not explicitly based on pre-existing Marvel characters (Ultimate Spider-Man followed suit with Geldoff and the series Ultimate X-Men has since added the characters of Syndicate and Magician).

== Publication history ==
It is notable for its involvement in the U-Decide campaign, and for being plagued by chronic lateness, taking a year and four months (from September 2002 to January 2004) to complete what was a supposedly monthly series. In contrast, the relaunched Captain Marvel, which debuted the same week as part of U-Decide, had its eighteenth issue released the same week as Ultimate Adventures #6 finally made it to shops.

== Characters ==
=== Heroes ===
Hawk-Owl, the Midnight Avenger/Jack Danner - A Batman pastiche, complete with secret lair ("the Nest") and crime-fighting gadgets. Unlike Bruce Wayne, Danner is far from being any sort of genius. Rather, he's a socially inept middle-aged billionaire with a rather dangerous and expensive hobby (however he is a skilled detective, able to rescue an infant who had been missing for weeks and break up a 200-million-dollar cocaine operation). He also lacks the traumatic murder experience of his DC counterpart, making him less "severe" in some respects, but also lacks a certain personal element to his own mission, however, it is implied by his Aunt Ruth and others that the death of his parents and uncle may not have been accidents as he claims, but in fact murders. His motivation for crime-fighting is instead frustration at Chicago's high crime rate after he retires from the Navy SEALS.

Woody/Hank Kipple - The Robin to Hawk-Owl's Batman. In some ways the actual main character of the story in Ultimate Adventures, which is largely about the creation and advent of the Woody character (which only appears in proper in that last issue of the series). Brash and assertive, well past the point of obnoxiousness, Hank seems to fear both making lasting connections (by rejecting nearly everybody) but also being ruthless.

=== Supporting characters ===
Daniel Toliver - Hawk-Owl's butler and best friend, the Ultimate Adventures variation on Alfred Pennyworth. An African-American veteran with an apparently difficult past, Toliver's character is often given to manic, almost aggressive outbursts throughout the series. This can be contrasted with Alfred Pennyworth's demure, passive attitude commonly shown. Toliver also proves important in Hawk-Owl's origin later on in the series.

Aunt Ruth - A mother figure of sorts towards Danner who lives at his mansion. Quite possibly an alcoholic, Ruth doesn't represent any particular Batman character so much as the supporting cast in general (although it is possible that she is a reference to Aunt Harriet from the 60's Batman television series). It is also unclear if Ruth knows about Danner's double life as the Hawk-Owl until the end of the series.

Lee - Danner's often-mute chauffeur. Not a direct relation to any Batman character either, but much closer to the Green Hornet's valet Kato.

The Principal - The main enemy of the Ultimate Adventures story. Hank's actual principal at one point, Larry Jones loses his grip on reality after a series of degrading events (including catching his wife being unfaithful multiple times) and suffering a concussion from Hank thanks to a misunderstanding. Holding on to the one grasp of identity he has left, Jones embodies the full meaning of the term Principal, becoming a sadistic disciplinarian and utilizing a series of weapons, all shaped like paddles. A satire of several Batman villains, including The Joker and Two-Face where a certain characteristic or quirk is magnified to a hyperbolic degree.

Ms. Willow - The Principal's assistant in crime. She is quite similar to the Joker's assistant, Harley Quinn.

== Plot ==
=== One Tin Soldier ===
At a Catholic orphanage located in Chicago, Hank Kipple is currently being disciplined for bad behavior (namely rigging the lights in the dorm rooms to not only use the Clapper, but also only to respond to his claps) and saying "God can shove it." Later on, there is a scene of Hank in his dorm room with several other children who live at the orphanage. It appears that his brash, rude manner even extends to his peers, and not just his authority figures. He also comments on the persistent danger of crime that is associated with living in an orphanage in downtown Chicago. Sure enough, as the children go to sleep, two burglars seek refuge in the dorm room of St. Frederick's. Hank starts smart-mouthing to the burglars, putting the other children of the orphanage in danger as the burglars decide to make them hostages. Just as one of the burglars begin threatening the children, a voice comes from the rafters of the old orphanage. It's Hawk-Owl, the Midnight Avenger. While the children don't recognize him (and some of the younger kids mistake him for Spider-Man), both of the thugs recognize him almost immediately. With Hank's help, the Hawk-Owl makes short work of the burglars with an assortment of crime-fighting tools. In the morning, while the children are still abuzz about the excitement the night before, Father Joe announces that the Orphanage is going to have a very special guest. This turns out to be Jack Danner, a successful albeit unkempt businessman, accompanied by his butler Daniel Toliver (whom he calls James in this issue,) his Aunt Ruth, and seemingly mute chauffeur Lee. Danner, interested in adopting one of the children from the orphanage, first has a question and answer session with them. Most of the children ask him about his house, especially if he has toys waiting for them. Hank, on the other hand, gives him quite a hard time on everything from his demeanor to his politics. Eventually Hank is told to leave, which he seems to appreciate. Toliver notes that Danner has already picked "the surly kid". As Danner is set to adopt one of the children, a child named John asks him if Danner will go take him "make poop," which startles Danner quite a bit, especially the prospect of having to watch him. Afterwards, Father Joe comes up to the dorm room where Hank has run off too, telling him to pack his bags. First thinking he's being kicked out, Hank grows very apologetic for the first time, until Joe explains himself: Danner has indeed chosen to adopt Hank. Hank expresses his confusion, given how rude he had been to Danner, but Joe proposed that perhaps Danner simply saw beyond the "bravado". Joe also reminds him to pack quickly, seeing how he doesn't usually recommend long goodbyes. By the time the conversation is over, Hank is back to his brash self, smart-mouthing to God one more time as he exits, in the shadow of Hawk-Owl.

In Danner's mansion in the suburbs, Toliver takes Hank to his new room and tells him that he was a street kid like Hank and he is lucky to get a break. Jack Danner, meanwhile, goes to "the Nest," his crime-fighting lair; Danner is secretly the Hawk-Owl. Later, Hank sees a flying car pass him, and learns that Hawk-Owl saved an Internet café. Next morning Hank Kipple goes to school and meets Principal Larry Jones and Ms. Willow, learning a little more about Danner's past. After his first day of school, Hank sees the flying car pass him again and finds "the Nest".

=== Afterwards ===
The duo were briefly mentioned as being Ultimates candidates in the first volume, and they have not been mentioned since.
