= List of AWA Studios publications =

AWA Studios (Artists, Writers & Artisans, Inc.) is an American independent comic book publisher founded in November 2018 by Axel Alonso, Bill Jemas and Jonathan F. Miller.

This is a list of publications by the company.

== The Resistance Universe (2020–2024) ==
Title	Issues	Writer(s)	Artist	Colorist	Start date	Conclusion date
The Resistance	#1–6	J. Michael Straczynski	Mike Deodato	Frank Martin	March 18, 2020	September 30, 2020
E-Ratic	#1–5	Karee Andrews		Brian Reber	December 2, 2020	April 28, 2021
The Resistance: Reborns	One-shot	J. Michael Straczynski	C. P. Smith	Snakebite Cortez	January 6, 2021	
The Resistance: Uprising	#1–6	J. Michael Straczynski	C. P. Smith	Snakebite Cortez	April 7, 2021	September 29, 2021
Moths	#1–6	J. Michael Straczynski	Mike Choi		June 2, 2021	November 24, 2021
Knighted	#1–5	Gregg Hurwitz	Mark Texeira	Brian Reber	November 8, 2021	March 30, 2022
The Joneses	#1–5	Michael Moreci	Alessandro Vitti	Ive Svorcina	April 6, 2022	August 31, 2022
E-Ratic 2: Recharged	#1–4	Kaare Andrews		Brian Reber	September 7, 2022	December 21, 2022
U&I	#1–6	J. Michael Straczynski	Mike Choi		February 7, 2024	September 25, 2024

== Hotell (2020–2022) ==
Title	Issues	Writer(s)	Artist	Colorist	Start date	Conclusion date
Hotell	#1–4	John Lees	Dalibor Talijic	Lee Loughridge	March 18, 2020	August 19, 2020
Hotell Vol. 2	#1–5	John Lees	Dalibor Talijic	Lee Loughridge	December 1, 2021	April 27, 2022

== Year Zero (2020–2023) ==
Title	Issues	Writer(s)	Artist	Colorist	Start date	Conclusion date
Year Zero	#1–5	Benjamin Percy	Ramon Rosanas	Lee Loughridge	April 4, 2020	September 30, 2020
Year Zero Vol. 2	#1–5	Benjamin Percy	Juan Jose Ryp	Frank Martin	November 4, 2020	March 24, 2021
Year Zero Vol. 0	#1–5	Daniel Kraus	Goran Sudžuka	Miroslav Mrva	October 5, 2022	February 22, 2023

== Devil's Highway (2020–2022) ==
Title	Issues	Writer(s)	Artist	Colorist	Start date	Conclusion date
Devil's Highway	#1–5	Benjamin Percy	Brent Schoonover	Nick Filardi	June 3, 2020	November 25, 2020
Devil's Highway Vol. 2	#1–5	Benjamin Percy	Brent Schoonover	Nick Filardi	May 4, 2022	September 28, 2022

== ET-ER (2021–2022) ==
Title	Writer(s)	Artist	Colorist	Start date
ET-ER	Jeff McComsey and Dan Panosian	Javier Pulido and Shawn Crystal	Javier Pulido and Jean-Francois Beaulieu	October 13, 2021
ET-ER Vol. 2	John Lees, Michael Coast and Stuart Moore	Vladimir Krstić-Laci, Mark Texeira and Nelson Blake II		June 8, 2022

== The Protopias Collection (2025–2026) ==
The Protopias Collection is a short story anthology of speculative fiction developed by AWA in collaboration with Futurific Studios.

Title	Writer(s)	Artist	Colorist	Start date
Polis	Mark Russell	Laci	Marco Lesko	April 2, 2025
The Purpose Project	Danny Hogan	Felipe Cunha	Lee Loughridge	June 25, 2025
Entanglement	Joshua Lak Kim and Ciara Ní Chuirc	Max Von Fafner		August 27, 2025
Gaya	Kathryn Murdoch and Michael Coast	Keron Grant		October 22, 2025
Aggie	Mark Russell	ACO and David Lorenzo Riveiro	Ive Svorcina	December 17, 2025
Black Moon Ritual	Ytasha Womack	Alitha Martinez	Marco Lesko	March 4, 2026

== Ultimate Oz Universe (2025–present) ==
Title	Writer(s)	Artist	Colorist	Start date
The Lost Lands	Cullen Bunn, Larry King and Julie McNulty	Mike Deodato Jr.	Ive Svorcina	November 11, 2025
Into the Outerlands	Fred Van Lente and Larry King	Mike Deodato Jr.	Ive Svorcina	August 25, 2026
Game of Nomes	Fred Van Lente and Larry King	Mike Deodato Jr.	Ive Svorcina	July 20, 2027

== Standalone series ==
Title	Issues	Writer(s)	Artist	Colorist	Start date	Conclusion date
Archangel 8	#1–5	Michael Moreci	C. P. Smith	Snakebite Cortez	March 18, 2020	September 23, 2020
Red Border	#1–4	Jason Starr	Will Conrad	Ivan Nunes	March 18, 2020	August 26, 2020
Old Haunts	#1–5	Ollie Masters and Rob Williams	Laurence Campbell	Lee Loughridge	May 20, 2020	October 28, 2020
Bad Mother	#1–5	Christa Faust	Mike Deodato	Lee Loughridge	August 5, 2020	December 30, 2020
Grendel, Kentucky	#1–4	Jeff McComsey	Tommy Lee Edwards		September 2, 2020	December 23, 2020
American Ronin	#1–5	Peter Milligan	ACO	Dean White	October 7, 2020	February 17, 2021
Byte-Sized	#1–4	Cullen Bunn	Nelson Blake II	Snakebite Cortez	December 9, 2020	March 31, 2021
Mann's World	#1–4	Victor Gischler	Niko Walter	Snakebite Cortez	January 13, 2021	April 21, 2021
Redemption	#1–5	Christa Faust	Mike Deodato	Lee Loughridge	February 3, 2021	June 30, 2021
Casual Fling	#1–5	Jason Starr	Dalabor Talijic	Marco Lesko	February 10, 2021	May 27, 2021
Chariot	#1–5	Bryan Edward Hill	Priscilla Petraites	Marco Lesko	March 3, 2021	July 28, 2021
Marjorie Finnigan, Temporal Criminal	#1–8	Garth Ennis	Goran Sudžuka	Miroslav Mrva	May 5, 2021	December 29, 2021
Fight Girls	#1–5	Frank Cho		Sabine Rich	July 7, 2021	November 17, 2021
Not All Robots	#1–5	Mark Russell	Mike Deodato	Lee Loughridge	August 4, 2021	December 29, 2021
Telepaths	#1–6	J. Michael Straczynski	Steve Epting	Brian Reber	September 1, 2021	February 23, 2022
Out	#1–5	Rob Williams	Will Conrad	Marco Lesko	October 6, 2021	February 23, 2022
Crimson Cage	#1–5	John Lees	Alex Cormack	Ashley Cormack	December 8, 2021	April 20, 2022
The Fourth Man	#1–4	Jeff McComsey	Mike Deodato	Lee Loughridge	January 5, 2022	April 27, 2022
Primos	#1–4	Al Madrigal	Felipe Flores	Brian Reber	February 2, 2022	May 25, 2022
Hit Me	#1–5	Christa Faust	Priscilla Petraites	Marco Lesko	March 2, 2022	July 27, 2022
Newthink	#1–5	Gregg Hurwitz	Mike Deodato	Lee Loughridge	June 1, 2022	October 26, 2022
Absolution	#1–5	Peter Milligan	Mike Deodato	Lee Loughridge	July 6, 2022	November 30, 2022
Sacrament	#1–5	Peter Milligan	Marcelo Frusin		August 3, 2022	December 28, 2022
Trojan	#1–4	Daniel Kraus	Vladmir "Laci" Krstic	Marco Lesko	January 4, 2023	April 26, 2023
Gatsby	One-shot	Jeremy Holt	Felipe Cunha	Dearbhla Kelly	May 10, 2023	
Black Tape	#1–4	Dan Panosian	Dalibor Talijic	Ive Svorcina	February 1, 2023	May 24, 2023
Red Zone	#1–4	Cullen Bunn	Mike Deodato	Lee Loughridge	March 1, 2023	June 21, 2023
Sins of the Salton Sea	#1–5	Ed Brisson	C. P. Smith		June 7, 2023	October 4, 2023
The Ribbon Queen	#1–8	Garth Ennis	Jacen Burrows	Dan Brown	July 26, 2023	February 28, 2024
The Madness	#1–6	J. Michael Straczynski	ACO	Marcelo Mariolo	August 9, 2023	January 10, 2024
Rumpus Room	#1–5	Mark Russell	Ramon Rosanas	Ive Svorcina	September 20, 2023	January 24, 2024
Red Light	#1–4	Sarah H. Cho	Priscilla Petraites	Miroslav Mrva	November 1, 2023	February 14, 2023
Little Black Book	#1–4	Jeff McComsey	Chris Ferguson	Marco Lesko	March 13, 2024	June 12, 2024
Death Ratio'd	One-shot	Mark Russell	Vladimir Krstić-Laci	Marco Lesko	May 29, 2024	
CamGirl	One-shot	Sarah Cho	C. P. Smith		February 12, 2025	
Look Out	One-shot	Dan Baillie	Tim Bradstreet	Axel Alonso	May 7, 2025	
They Choose Violence	#1–6	Sheldon Allen	Mauricio Campetella	Daniele Caramanico	June 18, 2025	October 15, 2025
ILLuminati	#1–7	Bryan Hill	Denys Cowan and Bill Sienkiewicz	Marco Lesko	July 2, 2025	November 5, 2025
Expecting the Unexpected	One-shot	Ronda Rousey	Mike Deodato Jr.	Marco Lesko	August 20, 2025	
Kill or Be Killed	One-shot	Peter Tieryas	Mike Choi	Axel Alonso	August 20, 2025	
Pick-Up	One-shot	Michael Coast	Felipe Cunha	Sabine Rich	March 18, 2026	
The Rising	One-shot	Greg Widen	Vladimir Krstić-Laci		September 23, 2026	
Beast Mode 510	One-shot	Sheldon Allen	Denys Cowan	Dexter Vines	October 7, 2026	

== Magazine ==
- Upshot Now

== Unproduced series ==
- Lil' Freakin Maniacs
- YT Savior

== Planned film and television adaptations ==
- Chariot
- Hotell
- Old Haunts
- Marjorie Finnigan, Temporal Criminal
- Devil's Highway
