= Charlot (name) =

Charlot is a Danish, German, Norwegian, and Swedish feminine given name that is an alternate form of Charlotte and a feminine form of Carl as well as the masculine Charlot. Charlot is a French masculine given name that is a diminutive form of Charles and a masculine form of Charlotte. Notable people referred to by this name include the following:

== Mononym ==
- Charlot (rowing) (fl. 1900), French coxswain
- Charlot or Chief Charlo (c. 1830 – 1910), chief of the Bitterroot Salish

== Given name ==
- Charlot Byj (1920–1983), American artist
- Charlot Jeudy (1984–2019), Haitian activist
- Charlot Kaské (fl. 1763–1765), Shawnee war chief
- Charlot Salwai (born 1963), Vanuatuan politician

== Surname ==
- André Charlot (1882–1956), French impresario
- Bernard Charlot (1944–2025), French academic and educational scientist
- Edmond Charlot (1915–2004), French publisher
- Émmanuel Charlot (born 1966), French water polo player
- Gaston Charlot (1904–1994), French chemist
- Jacques Charlot (1885–1915), French composer
- Jean Charlot (1898–1979) French-Mexican painter and illustrator
- Joseph Charlot (1827–1871), French composer
- Juli Lynne Charlot (1922–2024), American singer, actress and fashion designer
- Monica Charlot (1933–2005), British historian and political scientist
- Monique Pinçon-Charlot (born 1946), French sociologist

== Fictional characters ==
- Charlot, the French, Portuguese, Spanish and Italian name for Charlie Chaplin's character The Tramp

== See also ==
- Charlot (disambiguation)
- Charcot (disambiguation)
- Chariot (disambiguation)
- Charlo (name)
- Charlos (disambiguation)
- Sharlot Hall
