= Sharko (disambiguation) =

Sharko is a Belgian indie pop-rock band. Sharko may also refer to

- Sharko (surname)
- Sharko Shower, a French medical device
- Zig & Sharko, a French animated series
- Sharko-Bakumovka, a village in Voronezh Oblast, Russia
- Sharko, a documentary about Mark Graham

== See also ==
- Šarko (Šarplaninac), dog breed
- Charcot (disambiguation)
