= Chariot (disambiguation) =

A chariot is a two-wheeled, horse-drawn vehicle.

Chariot may also refer to:

== Vehicles ==
- Chariot (carriage), a horse-drawn vehicle for one or two standing riders
- Chariot (China), use of war chariots in China
- South-pointing chariot, an ancient Chinese vehicle that contains a movable pointer to indicate the south
- Chariot manned torpedo, underwater vehicle used by the Royal Navy in World War II
- Mitsubishi Chariot, a compact multi-purpose vehicle produced by Mitsubishi Motors
- The "Chariot", a tracked all-terrain vehicle used by the Robinson family in the television series Lost In Space

== Music ==
- Chariot (album), by Gavin DeGraw
  - "Chariot" (song), the title track from the album
- The Chariot (band), a hardcore band from Douglasville, Georgia, United States
- "The Chariot" (song), by the Cat Empire
- "Chariot", a song by Beach House from the album B-Sides and Rarities
- "Chariot", a French single by Petula Clark, translated into English as "I Will Follow Him"

== Other ==
- "Chariot", a disc golf midrange disc by Infinite Discs
- "Chariot", a fictional character from the anime series and video game Black Rock Shooter
- "Chariot", a piece in Xiangqi (Chinese chess)
- "The Chariot", the original published title of the poem "Because I could not stop for Death" by Emily Dickinson
- Chariot (Australia), Internet service provider
- Chariot (Chinese constellation), one of the twenty-eight mansions of the Chinese zodiac
- Chariot (company), a San Francisco-based commuter shuttle provider
- Chariot (comics), a 2021 comic book series
- Chariot (film), a 2022 film starring John Malkovich
- Chariot (video game), a 2014 video game
- Chariots Leisure Ltd, operator of a chain of gay bathhouses in the United Kingdom
- Operation Chariot, the St Nazaire Raid during World War II
- Project Chariot, a Project Plowshare program to excavate a harbor in Alaska with nuclear explosives
- The Chariot (tarot card), a Major Arcana tarot card
- "The Chariot" (Plebs), a 2014 television episode

== See also ==
- Charioteer (disambiguation)
- Charlot (name)
