= Carrus =

Carrus (Latin for "cart" or "cartload") may refer to:

== People ==
- Davide Carrus (born 1979), Italian footballer
- Gerald Carrus, American businessman who co-founded Infinity Broadcasting Corporation

== Other uses ==
- Load (unit), an English unit of weight or mass
- Carrus Navalis, a part of the Aalborg Carnival

== See also ==
- Car (disambiguation)
- Cart (disambiguation)
- Chariot (disambiguation)
