= Sharko (surname) =

Sharko is a gender-neutral Ukrainian surname. Notable people with the surname include:

- Greg Sharko, American tennis analyst
- Zinaida Sharko (1929–2016), Russian actress

== See also ==
- Sharkov
- Charcot (disambiguation)
