= Primos (comics) =

Latino superhero comic book

Publication information
- Publisher: AWA Studios
- Schedule: Monthly
- Publication date: February – June 2022
- No. of issues: 4

Creative team
- Created by: Al Madrigal
- Written by: Al Madrigal
- Artist: Carlo Barberi
- Penciller: Brian Reber

Collected editions
- Volume 1: ISBN 9781953165343

Primos is a 2022 science fiction comic book limited series created by writer Al Madrigal and artist Carlo Barberi. It was published by AWA Studios under itsUpshot imprint and ran for four issues. It was collected in trade paperback form in July 2022.

== Publication history ==
Madrigal's fascination with superheroes and passion for increasing the representation of Latinx stories, characters, and voices led him to create and write the comic book series Primos in 2022 with publisher AWA and former Marvel Editor in Chief Axel Alonso and artist Carlo Barberi. Primos brings together three distant cousins, bound together by their ancient spacefaring Maya lineage to the historical King Janaab, with a profoundly special purpose: to save the world as they know it.

In introducing three Latinx superheroes, Madrigal and AWA Studios are venturing into territory that has been shunned by most of the big comic book companies. But comic book fan culture is just as big in the Latinx community as it is anywhere else, and Madrigal hopes to capitalize on and honor the culture.

"A lot of the bigger characters were started in the '50s and '60s, and it's all White guys," Madrigal told Forbes Entertainment.

"They became so popular and it was sort of hard to introduce others. I always gravitated towards any minority character because I'm half-Mexican. It's nice to see yourself on the page and on the screen."

"There's so much inspiration to draw upon here, from the myth that the pyramids were built by aliens, to the success of the Mayan civilization and culture and the mystery around their cities' collapse," wrote Madrigal in an email to The Times. "However, the main inspiration was King Kʼinich Janaabʼ Pakal's rule from 603 to 683. It was a great building block for the 'Primos' mythology. I hope to be able to dive further into Mayan culture as I continue the series."

The first issue in the series was released on February 2, 2022, available in both English and Spanish.

== Synopsis ==
Centuries ago, two Mayan brothers constructed a spacecraft that sent them hurtling into outer space. Returned to Earth, only to find their culture and civilization destroyed, one of the brothers vows revenge and seeks to decimate the planet with intergalactic technology gathered on his travels. To prevent this, his sibling creates a contingency plan that activates the world's protectors – descendants of their own Pacal family. Now, the fate of the planet lies in the hands of three cousins scattered throughout Central and North America who have never even met.

== Collected editions ==
The series was collected in a trade paperback.

Title	ISBN	Release date	Issues
Primos Volume 1	978-1953165343	26 July 2022	Primos #1-4
