= Charlot (disambiguation) =

Charlot is the son of Charlemagne in the Matter of France.

Charlot may also refer to:

- Charlot equation analytical chemistry equation regarding pH
- Charlot (name)
- Charlot River Airport, airport in Charlot River, Saskatchewan, Canada
- The Tramp, known as Charlot in France, Spain and other countries
- Rue Charlot.

== See also ==
- Charlotte (disambiguation)
