= Huon of Bordeaux =

Title character of a 13th-century French epic poem

Huon of Bordeaux is a popular character of French romance. He is the title character of a late 13th-century chason de geste, a French epic poem with romance elements. Huon is a knight in the court of Charlemagne and son of Seguin de Bordeaux. Tales of his adventures tell of his exploits both at home and in the East, where he fights Saracens (the term used in the chansons de geste but rejected in contemporary criticism) and wins the heart of the Princess Escalarmonde, and eventually inherits the throne of the fairy king, Auberon.

Huon continues to be a folk hero. His adventures were adapted in the 15th and 16th centuries. The late 19th and early 20th centuries saw a renewed interest in romance characters of the Middle Ages, Huon among them, with the first modern editions by scholars like Gaston Paris, as well as retellings for both adult and young readers.

== Huon de Bordeaux ==
The poem tells of Huon, a knight who unwittingly kills Charlot, the son of Emperor Charlemagne. He is given a reprieve from death on condition that he fulfil a number of seemingly impossible tasks: he must travel to the court of the Emir of Babylon and return with a handful of the Emir's hair and teeth, slay the Emir's mightiest knight, and three times kiss the Emir's daughter, Esclarmonde. Huon eventually accomplishes all these feats with the assistance of the fairy king Auberon.

The poem is an example of late chansons de geste and recalls tropes and motifs of earlier generations of the French epics, such as the conflicts with Saracens, the Saracen Princess who converts to Christianity, and the association with the "epic of revolt". However, because of the lateness of the poem and its romance undertones, William Kibler has classified it as a "chanson d'aventure".

== Editions and Continuations ==
The oldest version of the chanson de geste that survives (in varying degrees of completeness) in three manuscripts and two short fragments. In its most complete version, it comprises 10,553 decasyllable verses grouped in 91 assonanced laisses. Presumed dates for its composition vary, but 1216 and 1268 are generally given as terminus post quem (earliest possible date) and terminus ante quem (latest possible date).

The success of the Huon story gave rise to six continuations or "sequels" and one prologue, which triple its length. Editors have not to date come up with a collective title for the Huon de Bordeaux Sequel Cycle.

The "episodes" in the cycle have been divided and titled thus by editors:

- Roman d'Aubéron – the Turin manuscript of the romance (the only manuscript to contain all of the continuations) contains the only version of this 14th-century prologue in the shape of a separate romance of Auberon. Auberon also refers to the title of another chanson de geste, Auberon, written as the prologue to Huon de Bordeaux. No prose version exists.
- Huon Roi de Féérie
- Chanson d'Esclarmonde
- Chanson de Clarisse et Florent
- Chanson d'Yde et d'Olive – summarized in the alexandrine version of the poem.
- Chanson de Croissant
- Chason d'Yde et Olive II – the story of Yde and Olive picks up again after the interlude of the story of their son, Croissant.
- Chanson de Godin – the Turin manuscript of the romance contains the only version of this 13th–14th century continuation. No prose version exists. The Turin manuscript also contains the romance of Les Lorrains, a summary in seventeen lines of another version of the story, according to which Huon's exile is due to his having slain a count in the emperor's palace.

The poem and most of its continuations were converted in 1454 to a rhymed version in alexandrines, the meter of later chansons de geste. Only one manuscript exists of this version, shelfmarked MS Paris, BnF français 1451.

The tale of Huon and his descendents was retold in prose during the 15th-century amid the wave of "mise en prose". While no manuscript exists of the prose version, it served as the base text for eleven extant 16th century printed editions, the earliest of which being the edition printed by Michel le Noir in 1513. The work was reprinted ten times in the 17th century, eight times in the 18th and four times in the 19th (notably in a beautifully printed and illustrated adaptation in modern French by Gaston Paris in 1898).

The romance came into vogue in England through the translation (c. 1540) of John Bourchier, Lord Berners, as Huon of Burdeux, through which Shakespeare heard of the French epic. In Philip Henslowe's diary there is a note of a performance of a play, Hewen of Burdocize, on 28 December 1593. The tale was dramatized and produced in Paris by the Confrérie de la Passion in 1557.

The poem was translated into Middle Dutch in the 14th-15th centuries. It stands at 1,500 lines compiled from fragments. The Middle Dutch romance takes liberties with its source material, adapting the story. It was retold in prose in the 16th century. There are three extant printed versions of the Dutch prose retelling, two of which are dated to 1540 and 1632.

The tale also serves as the basis for Christoph Martin Wieland's epic poem Oberon of 1780, in which Huon becomes the lover of the Sultan's daughter Rezia/Amanda. Andre Norton retold the tale in quasi-modern English prose as Huon of the Horn, published by Harcourt, Brace & Company in 1951. It is considered her first fantasy novel.

== Historical Sources ==
The Charlot of the story has been identified by Auguste Longnon (Romania vol. viii) with Charles the Child, one of the sons of Charles the Bald and Ermentrude of Orléans, who died in 866 in consequence of wounds inflicted by a certain Aubouin in precisely similar circumstances to those related in the romance. The father of Huon may safely be identified with Seguin, who was count of Bordeaux under Louis the Pious in 839, and died fighting against the Vikings six years later. Huon himself is probably based on Hunald I, duke of Aquitaine in the 8th century, who was defeated by Charlemagne's father.

== Translations ==
- Catherine M. Jones and William W. Kibler, ed. (2021). Huon of Bordeau. New York: Italica Press. p. 354. ISBN 978-1-59910-402-7.

== General and Cited References ==
- Frederick J. Furnivall, ed. (1871). Captain Cox, His Ballads and Books. Ballad Society. pp. xvii–xix. "Esclarmonde."
- François Guessard; Charles Loizeau de Grandmaison, eds. (1860). Huon de Bordeaux; chanson de geste (in French). Paris: F. Vieweg.
- M. Lens (2000). "Huon de Bordeaux". In W. P. Gerritson; A. G. Van Melle (eds.). Dictionary of Medieval Heroes. Boydell Press. p. 150. ISBN 0-85115-780-7. "Huon de Bordeaux."
- Lens, M. (2004). Huge van Bordeeus. Olifant, 23(1), 79–94.
- C. S. Lewis (1954). English Literature in the Sixteenth Century, Excluding Drama. Oxford History of English Literature. Oxford University Press. p. 152.
- Jean-Louis Picherit (1995). "Huon de Bordeaux". In William W. Kibler; Grover A. Zinn (eds.). Medieval France: An Encyclopedia (2nd ed.). New York: Garland. p. 4677. ISBN 0-8240-4444-4.
- Michel J. Raby, ed. (1998). Le Huon de Bordeaux en prose du XVème siècle (in French). New York: Lang. ISBN 0-8204-3301-2.
