= Charlos =

Charlos may refer to:

== People ==
- Natalia Charlos, Polish long-distance swimmer

== Places ==
- Charlos Cove, Nova Scotia, community in Nova Scotia, Canada
- Charlos Heights, Montana, unincorporated community in the United States

== See also ==
- Charlot (name)
- Charls
