= Joseph Charlot =

French composer

Joseph-Auguste Charlot (English: /ʃɑːrˈloʊ/ shar-LOH, French: [ʒɔzɛf oɡyst ʃaʁlo]; 21 January 1827 – August 1871) was a French composer.

== Life ==
Charlot began his musical education at the Conservatoire de Paris at the age of ten. He studied piano with Pierre Zimmermann and musical composition with Michele Carafa. In 1838, at the age of eleven, he received the first prize in solfège. The first prize for piano followed in 1841, the one for harmony and accompaniment in 1842. In 1850 he won the first prize of the Prix de Rome with the cantata Emma et Eginhard.

After his stay in Rome Charlot became an accompanist, later choirmaster at the Opéra-Comique. In 1866 he succeeded Eugène Vauthrot as choirmaster of the Orchestre de la Société des Concerts du Conservatoire. The Hartmann publishing house published the collection Dix mélodies from his estate.
