= Yde et Olive =

Thirteenth-century chanson de geste

Yde et Olive (Eed-eh-Oh-LEEV), sometimes spelled Ide et Olive, is a thirteenth-century chanson de geste written in decasyllabic assonanced (monorhyming) laisses in a Picard-influenced dialect of Old French. It is one episode in a cycle of sequels to Huon de Bordeaux that follow various members of Huon's family. Sometimes titled La Chason d'Yde et Olive by editors, the episode follows La Chanson d'Esclarmonde, the story of Huon's wife and Yde's grandmother, and La Chason de Clarisse et Florent, the story of Yde's parents. Yde et Olive is punctuated by a poem titled Croissant, which tells the story of Yde and Olive's son. Yde's story resumes after this interlude and is usually edited as Yde et Olive II. Caroline Cazanave's quintessential book on the Huon de Bordeaux Sequel Cycle contains an extensive discussion of the text and the manuscript tradition.

Some scholars believe it to be the earliest Old French adaptation of the myth of Iphis in Ovid's Metamorphoses though other scholars have questioned whether it is anything more than coincidentally similar to this ancient cognate. Likewise, it has been postulated that the story was worked into dramatic form in the Miracle de la fille d'un roy (1454), but some scholars have also rejected this hypothesis, claiming that the transference of the motif of a cross-dressing heroine escaping her father's incestuous desires results from oral tradition rather than direct textual influence. The play does not significantly deviate from the chanson except in its finale where the heroine Ysabelle's true sex is discovered at the end, where she restored to womanhood and married to the king instead of remaining married to his daughter. This ending recalls that of Le Roman de Silence.

== Manuscript and editions ==
The story of Yde and Olive appears in two manuscripts:

- Paris, Bibliothèque nationale de France, français, 1451, f. 225r (short summary of the text)
- Turin, Biblioteca nazionale universitaria, L. II. 14, f. 389va-395va and 397rb-399va

The latter contains the only surviving complete version of the story of Yde and Olive. The Turin manuscript, known as Ms T, is an illuminated and beautifully decorated book that fortunately survived the fire that ravaged the library in 1904. The manuscript has since been restored several times though some pages have been permanently damaged. It has recently been digitized in its entirety.

The story is split into two sections bookending the story of Croissant. This narrative arc is usually edited as Yde et Olive I, Croissant, and Yde et Olive II. The first part of Yde's story was translated into Modern English by Mounawar Abbouchi in Medieval Feminist Forum. The translation is accompanied by a facing-page edition of the original text and is accessible online. More recently in 2024, Elena Podetti published an edition of Yde et Olive I, Croissant, and Yde et Olive II with Champion. The Huon de Bordeaux Sequel Cycle had previously been edited twice in its entirety as PhD dissertations, once by Max Schweigel's in 1889, and a second time by Barbara Anne Brewka in 1977 at Vanderbilt University.

== Plot ==
The marriage of Florent to Clarisse is briefly recounted. A triumphant Florent returns to Aragon and is crowned king after the death of his father, Garin. Shortly after, Clarisse finds herself with child, but fears her pregnancy, and with good reason as the queen dies giving birth to a daughter named Yde. Florent goes into prolonged mourning, ignoring his kingly and fatherly duties, and refusing to remarry despite the insistence of his barons. However, as Yde grows into a young woman and the resemblance to Clarisse grows more pronounced, Florent falls in love with his own child and decides to marry her. Horrified by the prospect, Yde disguises herself as a man, steals her father's horse, and flees the country.

Going by Ydés, the hero now embarks on a series of chivalric adventures that eventually lead him to Rome, where he begins to serve the king, Oton. Impressed by his valor, Oton decides to marry Yde to his one and only daughter, Olive, and make him his heir. Finding no other way out, Yde reluctantly agrees to wed Olive. Yde abstains from consummating the marriage for fifteen days after their wedding, feining illness. Finally unable to resist his wife's urging that they consummate the marriage, Yde confesses his secret to Olive. The latter reassures him that his secret is safe, but their conversation is overheard and reported to the king, who vows to have them both burned if the story is true. In order to learn the truth, Oton summons Yde to bathe with him. The hero and his princess wife believe that all is lost and pray for salvation, when at the eleventh hour, an angel descends from heaven to command the king to let the matter lie, confirming that, by the will of God, Yde is now a man in body. The angel also announces that Oton will die eight days hence, that Yde and Olive will conceive a child that very night, and that the child Croissant will know hardship in life.

The episode some scholars have called Croissant follows, telling of the deeds of Yde and Olive's son. The narrative then picks up in Yde et Olive II with Florent dead and Yde returning to Aragon as the rightful heir to claim his throne.

== Influence and adaptations ==
=== Medieval and Early Modern ===
==== Adaptations into prose ====
In 1455, the entire Huon de Bordeaux cycle, including the sequels, was rewritten into prose as Les prouesses et faictz merveilleux du noble huon de bordeaulx, which was printed as an incunable. This was part of the fifteenth-century trend known as the "mise en prose", in which many famous romances were adapted into prose. In 1534, the prose version was translated into Middle English and printed as The Boke of Duke Huon of Burdeux by John Bourchier, Lord Berners, for Francis Hastings, Earl of Huntingdon, to be printed twice more, c. 1570 and in 1601. The stories were developed into a novel-like retelling.

==== Miracle play ====
A direct connection between the miracle play, Le miracle de la fille d'un roy, and Yde et Olive is contested, but the two share themes and plot points. In the play, the daughter of a king flees her father's incestuous desire and becomes a knight. It is miracle #37 in Les miracles de Nostre Dames par personnages.

=== Modern culture ===
In 2022, a short animation inspired by Yde et Olive was created by Camille Lorthioy, Julien Lin, Pauline de la Provôté, Sélène Chauveau, Meije Lanson, and Caroline Pagès for their graduating project from École Méliès. Daisy Black adapted Yde and Olive into a storytelling performance that she took on a tour in the UK in 2025.

== Bibliography ==
=== Editions and translation ===
- Abbouchi, Mounawar. "Yde and Olive." Medieval Feminist Forum. Subsidia Series no. 8. Medieval Texts in Translation 5, 2018.
- Brewka, Barbara Anne. “Esclarmonde, Clarisse et Florent, Yde et Olive I, Croissant, Yde et Olive II, Huon et les Géants, Sequels to Huon de Bordeaux, as Contained in Turin MS. L.II.14: an Edition.” PhD Diss. Vanderbilt University, 1977.
- Podetti, Elena, ed. La chanson d'Yde et Olive et de Croissant, chanson de geste de la fin du XIIIe siècle. Édition critique par Elena Podetti, d'après le manuscrit T, L. II. 14 de la bibliothèque de Turin. Paris, Champion, 2024,
- Schweigel, Max, ed. Esclarmonde, Clarisse et Florent, Yde et Olive: Drei Fortsetzungen der chanson von Huon de Bordeaux, nach der einzigen Turiner Handschrift. Marburg: N.G. Elwert, 1889.

=== Further reading ===
- Amer, Sahar. Crossing Borders: Love Between Women in Medieval French and Arabic Literatures. Philadelphia: University of Pennsylvania Press, 2008.
- Archibald, Elizabeth. “The Ide et Olive Episode in Lord Berners’ Huon of Bordeux.” Tradition and Transformation in Medieval Romance. Ed. Rosalind Field. Cambridge: D. S. Brewer, 1999.
- Cazanave, Caroline. D’Esclarmonde à Croissant: Huon de Bordeaux, l’épique médiéval et l’esprit de suite. France: Presse universitaire de Franche-Comté, 2007.
- Clark, Robert L. A. “A Heroine’s Sexual Itinerary: Incest, Transvestism, and Same-Sex Marriage in Yde et Olive.” Gender Transgressions: Crossing the Normative Barrier in Old French Literature. Ed. Karen J. Taylor. New York and London: Garland, 1998.
- De Weever, Jacqueline. “The Lady, the Knight, and the Lover: Androgyny and Integration in La Chason d’Yde et Olive.” Romanic Review 82.4 (1991): pp. 371-391.
- Dietzman, Sara Jane. “En guize d'omme : Female Cross-Dressing and Gender Reversal in Four Medieval French Texts.” PhD Diss. University of Virginia, 2005.
- Durling, Nancy Vine. “Rewriting Gender: Yde et Olive and Ovidian Myth.” Romance Languages Annual 1 (1989): pp. 256-262.
- Hotchkiss, Valerie R. Clothes Make the Man: Female Cross Dressing in Medieval Europe. New York: Garland, 1996.
- Perret, Michèle. “Travesties et Transsexuelles: Yde, Silence, Grisandole, Blanchandine.” Romance Review 25.3 (1985): pp. 328-340.
- Podetti, Elena, « Entre androgynie, sang et sainteté: aspects du sacré dans la Chanson d'Yde et Olive », La chanson de geste et le sacré. Actes du Xe colloque international de la Section française de la Société Rencesvals (Clermont-Ferrand, 18-20 octobre 2017), éd. Nathalie Bragantini-Maillard, Émilie Goudeau, Françoise Laurent, Claude Roussel et Nora Viet, Clermont-Ferrand, Presses universitaires Blaise Pascal, 2019, p. 203-214.
- Podetti, Elena, « Réminiscences mythiques et résonances hagiographiques dans la chanson d'Yde et Olive », La littérature médiévale entre mythes et sacré, éd. Hélène Averseng et Élisabeth Pinto-Mathieu, Genève, Droz (Les colloques de la Société de langues et littératures médiévales d'oc et d'oïl, 24), 2022, pp. 167-184.
- Prawer, Anna. "Melusine and Yde et Olive: Subversive Narrative Power in the Medieval Female Body." Locus: The Seton Hall Journal of Undergraduate Research 8.1 (2025): p. 7.
- Robins, William. “Three Tales of Female Same-Sex Marriage: Ovid’s “Iphis and Ianthe,” the Old French Yde et Olive, and Antonio Pucci’s Reina d’Oriente.” Exemplaria 21.1 (2009): pp. 43-62.
- Sobczyk, Agata, L'érotisme des adolescents dans la littérature française du Moyen Âge, Louvain, Peeters (Synthema, 5), 2008, pp. ix + 329.
- Spaggiari, Paolo, Yde et Olive e la figura della donna guerriera nella letteratura oitanica, Quattro Castella, Lux Victrix Edizioni, 2019, p. 44.
- Tanase, Gabriela. “Le Travestissement et ses ambiguïtés.” Jeux de masques, jeux de ruses dans la littérature française médiévale (XIIe-XVe siècles). Paris: Honoré Champion Éditeur, 2010.
- Walter, Marguerite C. “Cross-Gender Transformation and the Female Body in La Chanson d’Yde et Olive,” Mediaevalia 22.2 (1999): pp. 307-322.
- Watt, Diane. “Behaving Like a Man? Incest, Lesbian Desire, and Gender Play in Yde et Olive and Its Adaptations.” Comparative Literature 50.4 (1998): pp. 265-285.
