= Charcot disease =

Charcot disease (English: /ʃɑːrˈkoʊ/ shar-KOH, French: [ʃaʁko]) can refer to several diseases named for Jean-Martin Charcot, such as:

- Amyotrophic lateral sclerosis, a degenerative muscle disease also known as Charcot disease or Lou Gehrig's disease
- Charcot–Marie–Tooth disease, an inherited demyelinating disease of the peripheral nervous system
- Neuropathic arthropathy, progressive degeneration of a weight bearing joint, also known as Charcot joint disease or Charcot arthropathy
- Spinal osteoarthropathy, a rare abnormal bone growth disorder in reptiles

== See also ==
- Jean-Martin Charcot#Eponyms
