= Al Madrigal =

American comedian and actor (born 1971)

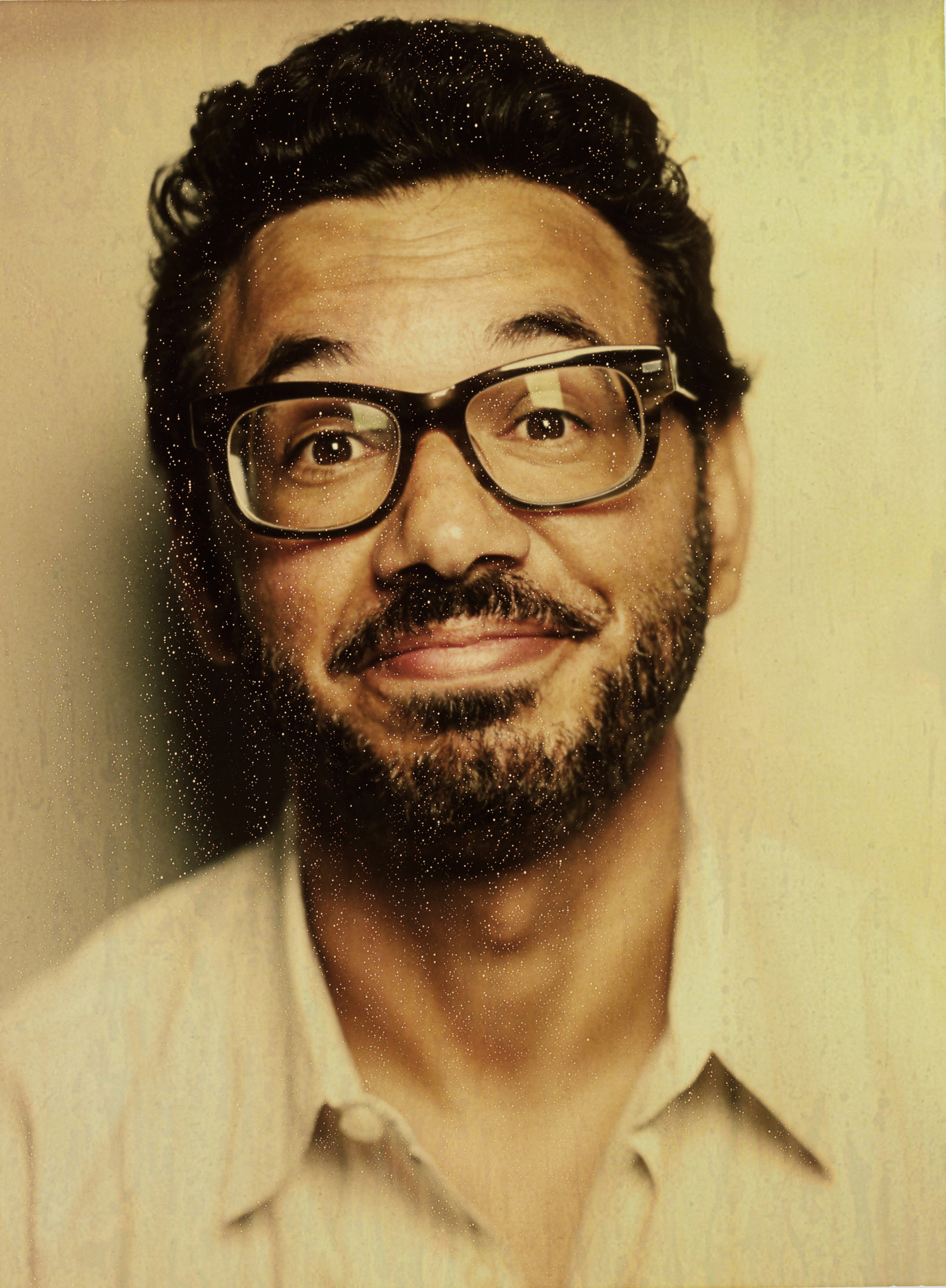
- Madrigal in 2014
- Born: Alessandro Liborio Madrigal; July 4, 1971 (age 55); San Francisco, California, U.S.
- Children: 2

Comedy career
- Medium: Stand-up, television, film
- Genres: Observational comedy, satire
- Subjects: American culture, human behavior, family, fatherhood, cultural assimilation
- Website: www.almadrigal.com

Alessandro Liborio Madrigal (born July 4, 1971) is an American comedian, actor, writer, and producer. He is a co-founder of the All Things Comedy podcast network, alongside Bill Burr. He rose to fame on The Daily Show with Jon Stewart as a regular correspondent for five seasons. Outside of the standup world, he is known for his co-starring roles in the film Night School, Showtime's dark comedy I'm Dying Up Here, NBC's About A Boy, as well as CBS sitcoms Broke, Gary Unmarried and Welcome to The Captain. He has also performed on Conan and The Tonight Show Starring Jimmy Fallon. He is currently developing multiple projects for TV within his current deal at CBS Studios.

He appeared in the sports drama The Way Back, starring Ben Affleck and directed by Gavin O'Connor. He appears in the Sony's Spider-Man Universe film Morbius as Alberto "Al" Rodriguez. He was a series regular on NBC's hit comedy Lopez vs. Lopez. In 2022, Madrigal teamed up with AWA and former Marvel Editor in Chief Axel Alonso to release the comic book Primos.

== Early life ==
Madrigal was born in San Francisco, California, to Ms. Tarantino and Mr. Madrigal, with his younger brother, Raphael. He grew up in San Francisco's Inner Sunset District, where his neighbors included successful comedians Mike Pritchard and Michael Meehan. His father is Mexican (from Tijuana) and his mother is Sicilian. He attended Ecole Notre Dame Des Victoires, a private Catholic school in San Francisco that emphasizes instruction of French language and culture. He attended St. Ignatius College Preparatory High School for the class of 1989. He then attended the University of San Francisco.

Madrigal worked for 10 years in a human resources staffing agency run by his family, where one of his main responsibilities was firing people. He often worked humor into the job. He credits his experiences at the staffing company with preparing him for stand-up comedy: "I was in so many scary situations ... by the time I got on stage, I had no stage fright. Speaking in front of a group was nothing." In 1998, he decided to pursue a full-time career in comedy.

== Career ==
=== Stand-up comedy ===
Madrigal's stand-up comedy is story-based, centering on his personal life, family, and the confusion caused by his multiethnic background. Early in his comedy career, he was often pigeonholed as a "Latino comic." Madrigal says he has been criticized as not being Latino enough, such as for not speaking Spanish.

Madrigal began his career in San Francisco's comedy clubs, both as a solo performer and as a member of the sketch group Fresh Robots, which he co-founded. In 2002, he enjoyed his first major exposure in two comedy festivals: SF Sketchfest, as part of Fresh Robots, and the "New Faces" showcase of the Just for Laughs Festival in Montreal.

In 2004, Madrigal won a jury award for best stand-up comedian at the U.S. Comedy Arts Festival in Aspen, Colorado. After winning the award, he signed a talent holding deal with CBS.

Madrigal's Comedy Central Presents half-hour special premiered in July 2005. In April 2013, Madrigal's first one-hour special, Why Is The Rabbit Crying?, also premiered on Comedy Central. The special was named one of the top 10 comedy specials of 2013 by both Westword and The Village Voice and was praised for "deconstructing stereotypes rather than enforcing them" and "milking incongruity between expectations and reality to hilarious effect."

Madrigal taped his latest stand-up special Shrimpin' Ain't Easy in December 2016 in the Masonic Lodge at Hollywood Forever Cemetery. Directed by Neal Brennan, the special premiered on Showtime in 2017.

Madrigal has been a guest on Jimmy Kimmel Live! and The Late Late Show with Craig Ferguson. He appeared on The Tonight Show with Conan O'Brien on July 8, 2009. He later appeared on Conan's TBS Show, Conan, on May 10, 2011.

=== Acting ===
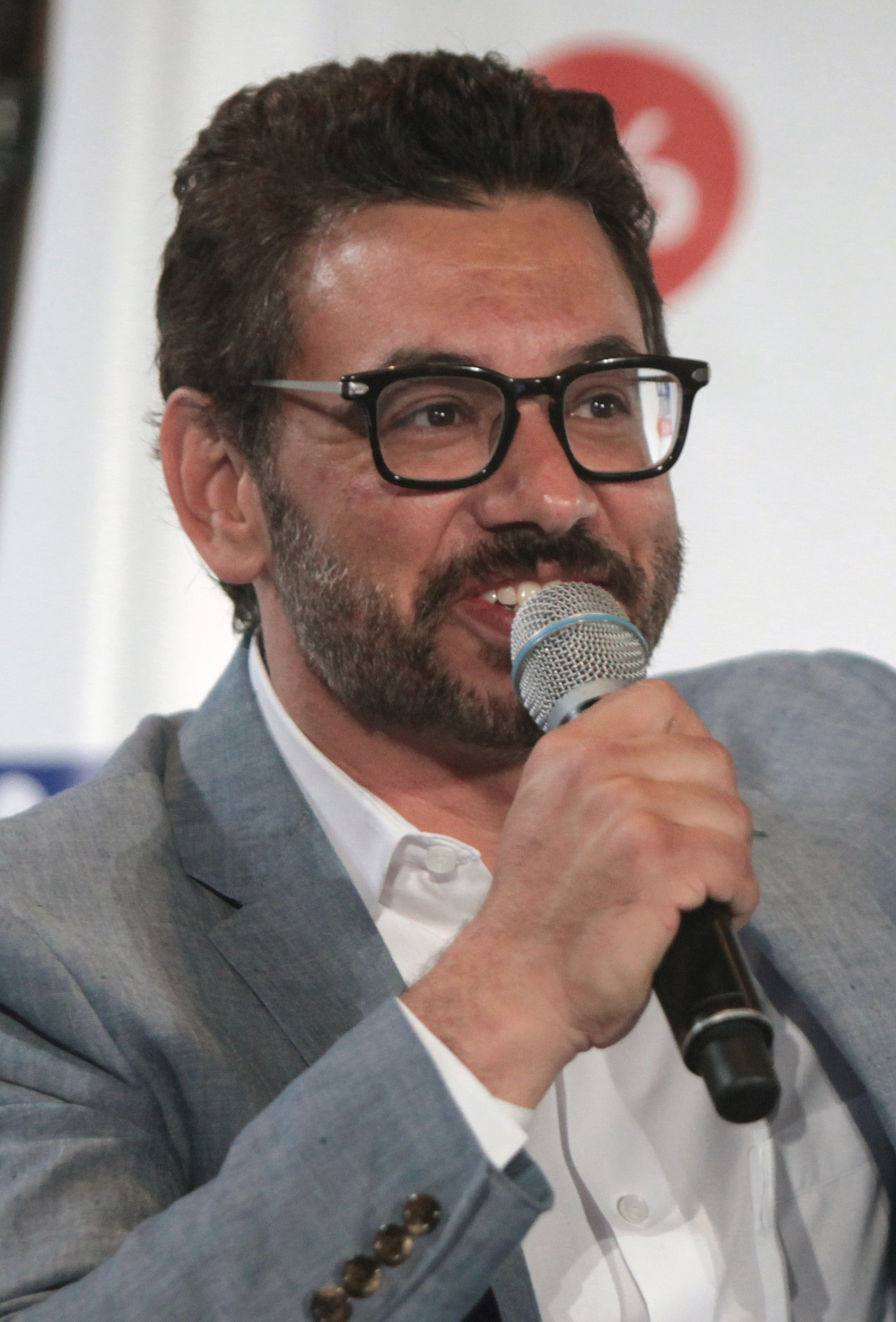
Madrigal performing at Politicon in 2016.

In 2003, Madrigal successfully auditioned for a starring role on The Ortegas, a comedy series for the Fox Network. The series, which was based on the BBC comedy The Kumars at No. 42, cast Madrigal as the son of a Mexican American family in California who hosts a TV talk show from a studio he operates in the backyard of his parents' home. However, the network dropped the series from its schedule before broadcasting any of its six filmed episodes.

In January 2008, Madrigal was cast as a building attendant named Jesús (pronounced "Hey-Soose") in the CBS comedy Welcome to The Captain. The series was cancelled after five episodes.

He co-starred in the CBS series Gary Unmarried (originally titled Project Gary), which debuted in September 2008.

On March 14, 2013, it was announced that Madrigal would be joining NBC's About A Boy as Andy, the main character's best friend. He received a 2014 Imagen Awards nomination for Best Supporting Actor for his work in the role.

Madrigal was a series regular on the Showtime series I'm Dying Up Here. He played a stand-up comedian named Edgar in the dark comedy about Los Angeles' infamous stand-up comedy scene of the 1970s. The show, which is based on William Knoedelseder's nonfiction book of the same name, is executive produced by Jim Carrey.

=== The Daily Show with Jon Stewart ===
On May 17, 2011, it was announced that Madrigal would be joining The Daily Show with Jon Stewart. He was often presented as the "Senior Latino Correspondent."

Madrigal auditioned for the show on the recommendation of stand-up comedian Adam Lowitt, one of the show's producers. Madrigal and Lowitt performed a piece at Carolines on Texas Representative Debbie Riddle, who proposed a bill that would create state punishments for those who "intentionally, knowingly, or recklessly" hired unauthorized immigrants except for domestic workers. Madrigal later did a reading of the piece with Jon Stewart, who hired him on the spot.

Madrigal made a return guest appearance on January 23, 2025.

=== All Things Comedy ===
In 2012, Madrigal and comedian Bill Burr founded All Things Comedy, a comedy podcast network and artist cooperative. The pair started the network as a way to help comedians maintain full ownership of their work.

All Things Comedy was officially launched on October 1, 2012, with a roster of eleven podcasts including the Monday Morning Podcast by Bill Burr, The Long Shot Podcast by Eddie Pepitone, and Skeptic Tank by Ari Shaffir. By 2014, the network had six dozen members and over fifty podcasts. The network was established as an artist owned cooperative, which Madrigal and Burr emphasize as an important aspect of the collective. All Things Records was started in March 2014 and released three albums in the months following its creation including Believe in Yourself by Sam Tripoli, Live at the Comedy Castle by Brian Scolaro, This Will Make an Excellent Horcrux by Jackie Kashian. Madrigal sees the network as a way of improving representation of Latin American people in media. For instance, the networks provides Spanish-language podcasts such as Leyendas Legendarias and El Dollop. Comedy Central partnered with All Things Comedy to produce a documentary about Patrice O'Neal as well as three comedy specials. The network now hosts over 50 podcasts and garners nearly 5 million listeners per month.

At South by Southwest 2015, Madrigal, Burr, and comedian Doug Benson spoke on the "Owning Your Work: The Future of All Things Comedy" panel, where they "discussed the ins and outs of their operation and how they are working to help comics carve out their own paths in show business and avoid traditional gatekeepers."

From 2010 to 2014, he co-hosted a podcast called "Minivan Men" with comedians Maz Jobrani, Aaron Aryanpur, and Chris Spencer, in which they discussed marriage, parenting, and domestic issues.

Madrigal and Burr host the All Things Comedy Live Podcast, which streams monthly. The podcast has featured comics including Sinbad, Nick Thune, Felipe Esparza, Doug Benson, Pete Holmes, Ian Edwards, and Fred Stoller.

More recently, he signed a deal with CBS Studios.

=== Primos ===
Madrigal's fascination with superheroes and passion for increasing the representation of Latino stories, characters, and voices led him to create and write the comic book series Primos in 2022 with publisher AWA and former Marvel Editor in Chief Axel Alonso and artist Carlo Barberi. Primos brings together three distant cousins, bound together by their ancient spacefaring Maya lineage to the historical King Janaab, with a profoundly special purpose: to save the world as they know it. The first issue in the series was released on February 2, 2022, and sold out. Each issue is available in both English & Spanish.

Centuries ago, two Mayan brothers constructed a spacecraft that sent them hurtling into outer space. Returned to Earth, only to find their culture and civilization destroyed, one of the brothers vows revenge and seeks to decimate the planet with intergalactic technology gathered on his travels. To prevent this, his sibling creates a contingency plan that activates the world's protectors – descendants of their own Pacal family. Now, the fate of the planet lies in the hands of three cousins scattered throughout Central and North America who have never even met.

=== Half Like Me ===
On January 22, 2015, Madrigal's one-hour comedic documentary special, Half Like Me, premiered on Fusion. The program follows Madrigal on his quest to get closer to his Mexican roots in preparation for a family reunion in Tijuana, Mexico. During the course of the program Madrigal explores different aspects of Latino culture in the U.S. The A.V. Club called it "solid and thought-provoking" while the Los Angeles Times listed the special as a "Critic's Pick". In an interview with LA Weekly, Madrigal said, "'people are actually reaching out and wanting to teach this in their classrooms.'"

== Personal life ==
He is Mexican–Sicilian, with his father's family being third-generation Mexicans. His wife is Korean–Greek.

== Filmography ==
=== Film ===
Year	Title	Role	Notes
2009	Lies and Illusions	Martin	
2013	Why Is The Rabbit Crying?	Himself	Stand-up special
2015	Still Punching The Clown	Officer Delgado	
2015	Half Like Me	Himself	Short film
2016	Punching Henry	Officer Delgado	
2016	Snatched	Embassy Official	
2018	Night School	Luis	
2020	The Way Back	Dan	
2021	The Map of Tiny Perfect Things	Mr. Pepper	
2021	Violet	Darren Brightly	
2021	Happily	Arthur	
2021	Hero Mode	Larry	
2022	Morbius	Agent Alberto Rodriguez	
2022	Unplugging	Juan	
2022	Hollywood Stargirl	Iggy	
2023	Air	Tim	
2024	Drugstore June	Detective David Foltz	

=== Television ===
Year	Show	Role	Notes
2003	The Ortegas	Luis Ortega	TV series
2004	Americana		TV movie
2004	Shorties Watchin' Shorties	Himself	Episode 2.9
2008	Welcome to The Captain	Jesus	5 episodes
2008	Happy Hour	Ray	Episode: "The Family Affair"
2008	Buddy 'n' Andy	'Mucho Gusto'	Short film
2009	Los Foley Guys	Ray	TV series
2008–2009	Gary Unmarried	Dennis Lopez	20 episodes
2009	The Very Funny Show		TV series
2007–2010	Wizards of Waverly Place	Spanish Pocket Elf	2 episodes
2010	Pretend Time	Manuel	Episode: "Powdered Doughnuts Make Me Go Nuts"
2010	Tax Man	Gilooly	TV movie
2010	3 Non Juans	Himself	Stand-up
2011–2016	The Daily Show	Himself (correspondent)	66 episodes
2011–2012	Free Agents	Gregg	8 episodes
2014	American Dad!	Mexican Security Guard (voice)	Episode: "Big Stan on Campus"
2014–2015	About a Boy	Andy	28 episodes
2016	Lucifer	Jonathan Medina	1 episode
2016	Fresh Off the Boat	Mr. G	1 episode
2016	This Is Not Happening	Himself	1 episode
2017	Shrimpin' Ain't Easy	Himself	Showtime Stand-up Special
2017–2018	I'm Dying Up Here	Edgar 'Manny' Martinez	20 episodes
2018	Single Parents	Rick	Episode: "Politician, Freemason, Scientist, Humorist and Diplomat, Ben Franklin"
2019	Ball & Tee	Range Ball / Elitist Ball / Gimmick Tree	Miniseries
2020	Broke	Derek	3 episodes
2020	Muppets Now	Pizza Delivery Person	Episode: "Getting Testy"
2021	Physical	Jack Logan	4 episodes
2021	Immoral Compass	Jeffrey	Episode: "Relationships"
2022	Rutherford Falls	Al	Episode: "White Man in the Cupboard"
2022–2025	Lopez vs Lopez	Oscar Rivera	Main role
2022–2023	Bob's Burgers	Man/Raul/Will (voice)	2 episodes
2023	Clone High	Frederico (voice)	Recurring role
2024	Barmageddon	Himself	Episode: "Al Madrigal vs. Nikki Glaser"
2024	Curb Your Enthusiasm	Lorenzo	Episode: "Ken/Kendra"
2025	St. Denis Medical	Michael	Episode: "No Wonder His Kidney Wants Out"
2026	Newlyweds	Dan	Recurring role
2027	Oswald	TBA	Post-production

=== Web series ===
Year	Show	Role	Notes
2016–present	WHIH Newsfront – With Christine Everhart	Will Adams	5 episodes

=== Video games ===
Year	Title	Role	Notes
2025	Goodnight Universe	Simon	

== Awards and nominations ==
Year	Nominated work	Award	Category	Result
2004	Stand-up	HBO Aspen Comedy Festival Juror Award	Best Stand-up Comedian	Won
2014	"Blowing the Whistle on Whistleblowers" from The Daily Show	Genesis Awards	The Sid Caesar Comedy Award	Won
2014	About a Boy	Imagen Awards	Best Supporting Actor	Nominated
2015	N/A	Mixed Remix Festival	Storyteller's Prize	Won
