= Charlot Byj =

American artist

Charlot Byj (pronounced "bye"; September 28, 1920 – August 7, 1983) was an artist known for her greeting card designs, posters and advertising artwork in the mid-1940s. She is most famous for the transformation of her artwork into a line of figurines created by Goebel.

Living in New York City after art school, Charlot ducked into the doorway of a greeting card store during a rainstorm. She admired the greeting card line, noted the name of the publisher, and called the company for an interview. She was hired by the publisher and began creating illustrations for greeting cards, featuring the impish, redheaded children that became her trademark, namely, Shabby O'Hair, his sister Raggy Muffin, and their plump mother, M'Lady O'Hair.

Franz Goebel, of the W. Goebel Porzellanfabrik company, took a liking to her artwork and invited her to his German production facility. Working with master sculptor Arthur Moeller, they designed the first figurine, named "Strike", in 1957.

Between 1957 and 1988, when the series was discontinued, more than 100 different figurines had been created. The line included both redhead and blonde children. The redhead figurines, as they are known, are mischievous characters, whereas the blondes tend to portray more serene characteristics.

Charlot became ill in 1980 and began cutting back on her designing. On August 7, 1983, she died in New York City a few weeks short of her 63rd birthday.
