= Chariot (comics) =

2021 science fiction comic book series

- The cover to Chariot #1.

Publication information
- Publisher: AWA Studios
- Schedule: Monthly
- Format: Limited series
- Publication date: March – July 2021
- No. of issues: 5

Creative team
- Created by: Bryan Edward Hill; Priscilla Petraites
- Written by: Bryan Edward Hill
- Artist: Priscilla Petraites
- Colorist: Marco Lesko

Collected editions
- Volume 1: ISBN 9781953165213

Chariot is a 2021 science fiction comic book limited series created by writer Bryan Edward Hill and artist Priscilla Petraites. It was published by AWA Studios under their Upshot imprint and ran for 5 issues, being collected in trade paperback form in October 2021.

== Publication history ==
Hill described the series as his "ode to the neon-righteous sci-fi action stories I’ve always loved"" and "synthwave fever dream". He first came into contact with Petraites in 2015 after seeing a piece of fan art she had created based on the film Blade Runner. The pair largely co-operated on the series over the internet due to the impact of the COVID-19 pandemic, using Skype; Petraites noted that they had yet to meet face-to-face when publication began. She also credited The Matrix, Akira and Ghost in the Shell as influences. Covers for the series were drawn by Jeff Dekal.

== Synopsis ==
Created in the Cold War, the Chariot is an exotic sports car with a highly advanced computer mainframe capable of digitally receiving a person's consciousness. It is targeted by sisters Gillian and Delia, assassins and thieves who have grown tired of working for various intelligence agencies before striking out on their own. Gillian is able to steal the Chariot but is pursued and knocked into a lake, where she drowns.

Some forty years later the car is discovered by junkyard worker Jim. A skilled mechanic and occasional getaway driver, Jim is a convicted felon who is divorced from his wife Sadie. The pair are still relatively cordial but their son Ben has a serious kidney ailment and they are struggling to pay his healthcare bills. Jim is already heavily in debt to local loan shark Frank. Tinkering with the Chariot after hours, Jim is attacked by Frank and his hoods, only for them to come under attack from the car. He then meets a projection of Gillian, whose consciousness was uploaded to the mainframe at the moment of her death. The reactivation of the Chariot alerts Delia, who is embittered and aged, using nanotechnology to periodically regain her youth.

After cajoling Jim into forming a partnership, Gillian uses a digital arena to rapidly teach Jim fighting skills and the pair become close, even having sexual intercourse in the virtual world. Wanting the Chariot in order to extend her life, Delia kidnaps Ben. Gillian digitally confronts Delia to distract her while Jim drives the Chariot to her base. Delia responds to his arrival by attacking with a motorcycle capable of transforming into a mech suit, but after a chase and battle with the Chariot she is killed. Delia's advanced technology cures Ben. With the authorities believing Jim is dead due to Gillian's hacking he sets off in the Chariot with her. The pair plan to find a way of restoring Gillian to a physical form while also investigating the mysterious source of Delia's orders.

== Reception ==
Reviewing the first issue for Bleeding Cool, Hannibal Tabu praised the book's art and style but was more reserved about the characterisation; he felt the second issue was much improved, describing it as "a wildly confectionary delight" and compared the style to that of Patrick Nagel. Dan Grote of Comics XF drew comparisons to Knight Rider and Baby Driver in a tentatively positive review.

== Film adaptation ==
In July 2021 it was announced that Warner Bros. had purchased the rights to a film version of the story, with Joseph Kosinski attached to direct.

== Collected editions ==
The series has been collected in a trade paperbacks.

Title	ISBN	Release date	Issues
Chariot Volume 1	9781953165213	20 Oct 2021	Chariot #1-5
