= Spinal osteoarthropathy =

Rare disease affecting reptiles

Corn snake (Panterophis guttatus) with spinal arthropathy

Spinal osteoarthropathy in snakes, also known as Charcot's disease (English: /ʃɑːrˈkoʊ/ shar-KOH, French: [ʃaʁko]), is a chronic musculoskeletal disorder characterized by proliferative and degenerative changes affecting the vertebral column, including the vertebral bodies, articular processes, and intervertebral articulations.

The movement of reptiles with this ailment appears jittery and wooden, and the head movement will be greatly restricted. The condition worsens as the patient ages; the result is a reptile fused together by its own bones. They are usually euthanized well before this stage, but in general these animals can live their short lives comfortably with little pain. Spinal osteoarthropathy can also occur in humans.

== Causes ==
The condition is most frequently observed in captive snakes and is thought to have a multifactorial etiology involving advanced age, chronic mechanical stress, obesity, inadequate husbandry, previous trauma, and, in some cases, infectious spondylitis or metabolic bone disease. Clinically, affected animals may present with reduced spinal flexibility, reluctance to move, localized swelling, pain on palpation, or progressive neurological deficits when vertebral remodeling results in spinal cord compression. Diagnosis is primarily based on diagnostic imaging, with radiography revealing osteophyte formation, vertebral ankylosis, irregular articular margins, and spondylotic changes, while computed tomography provides superior assessment of osseous proliferation and the extent of spinal canal involvement.[ Divers SJ, Stahl SJ (eds.). Mader's Reptile and Amphibian Medicine and Surgery. 3rd ed. Elsevier; 2019.] Treatment is generally conservative and focuses on optimizing husbandry, weight management, analgesia, and anti-inflammatory therapy, although surgical intervention may be considered in selected cases with severe neurological compromise.

== Housing ==
A reptile with spinal osteoarthropathy does not require a large vivarium. Like all vivaria it needs to be heated according to the particular reptile's needs, with a dark hiding area (e.g. a log or dark box), normal substrate and clean water for the reptile to access. It is advisable not to have anything too high for them to climb because the reptile's ability to hold onto branches (for example) is restricted; floor space is more important. It is best not to keep them with a tank-mate (especially a healthy one), since bullying may occur.

== Feeding ==
Reptiles with this condition are usually fed small rodents (e.g. mice) which are small, easy to swallow. Animals with this condition find it more difficult to eat (especially snakes, whose bony growths compromise their ability to manipulate food down their throat).

== Handling ==
Handling may be painful and stressful because of their poor body movement. Due to the stress, handling should be kept to a minimum.
