= Charlot =

Fictionalized form of Charles the Younger, son of Charlemagne

Charlot (English: /ʃɑːrˈloʊ/ shar-LOH, French: [ʃaʁlo]; lit. '"Little Charles"') is a fictionalized form of Charles the Younger (c. 772 – December 4, 811), son of Charlemagne, in the tradition of the Matter of France. His legend may also incorporate elements of Charlemagne's great-grandson Charles the Child.

He slew the son of Ogier the Dane, and was killed in revenge, causing a long period of strife between Ogier and the emperor. In the story of Huon of Bordeaux, it is Huon who kills Charlot. Charlot is possibly based on Charlemagne's real son Charles, who predeceased his father; Auguste Longnon identified him with Charlemagne's grandson Charles the Child, who died before his father Charles the Bald in a similar situation as Charlot in a fight with a man named Aubouin.
