= Eugène Vauthrot =

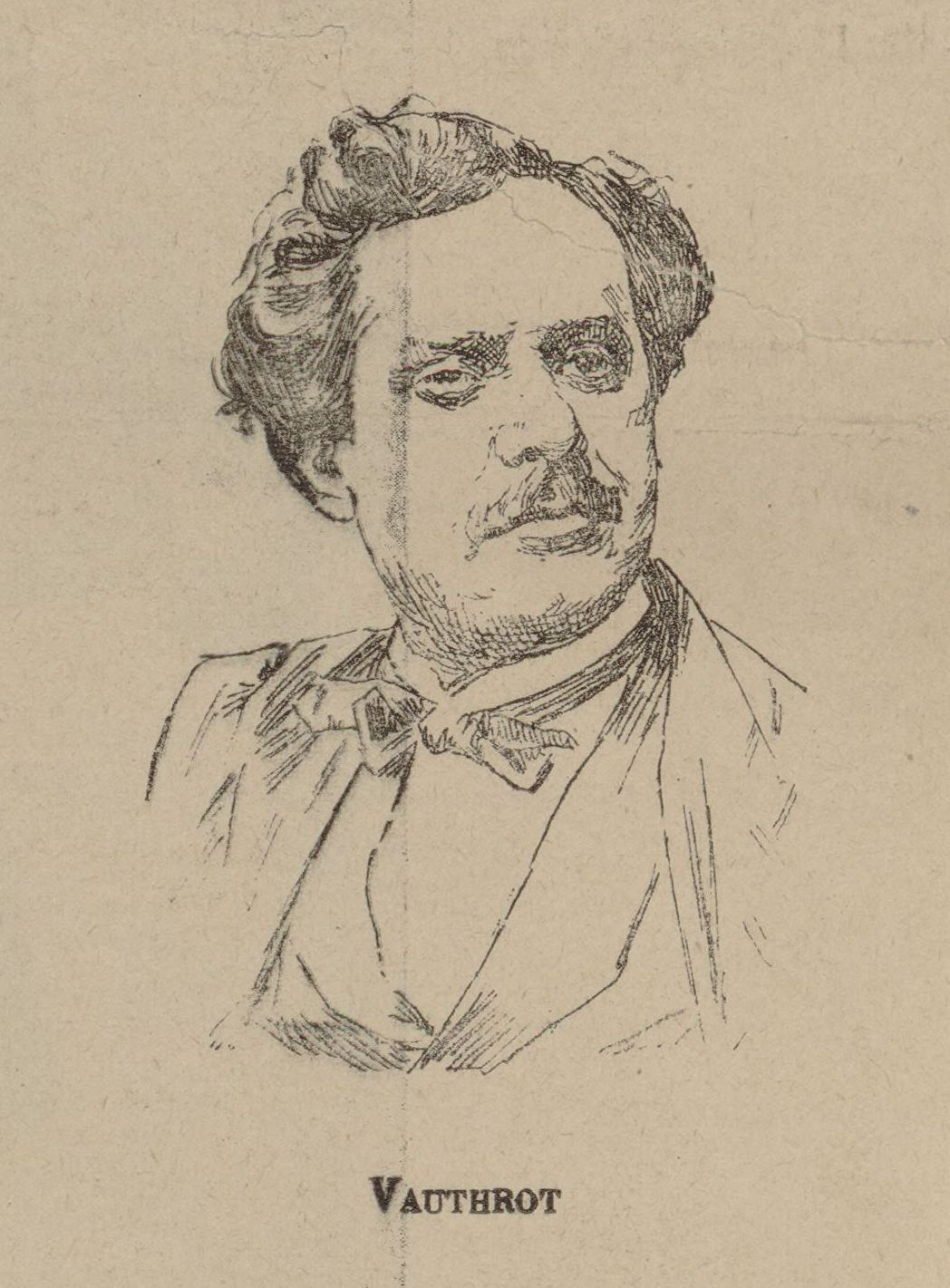
Eugène Vauthrot on an article about the representation of Tannhäuser in 1861 at the Opéra de Paris

Eugène-François Vauthrot (2 September 1825 in Paris – 18 April 1871 there) was a French pianist and organist, leader of singing at the Opéra de Paris (1856-1870), singing teacher at the Conservatoire de Paris (1865), and arranger of piano reductions of French vocal works.

With Victor Massé and Louis Croharé, Vauthrot took part in the 164 rehearsals of Tannhäuser for the 1861 performances at the Paris Opéra. Richard Wagner paid tribute to them: "they had made it easier for him to do his job with real dedication".
