= Aalborg Carnival =

Annual event in Aalborg, Denmark

Coordinates: 57.042185°N 9.914007°E

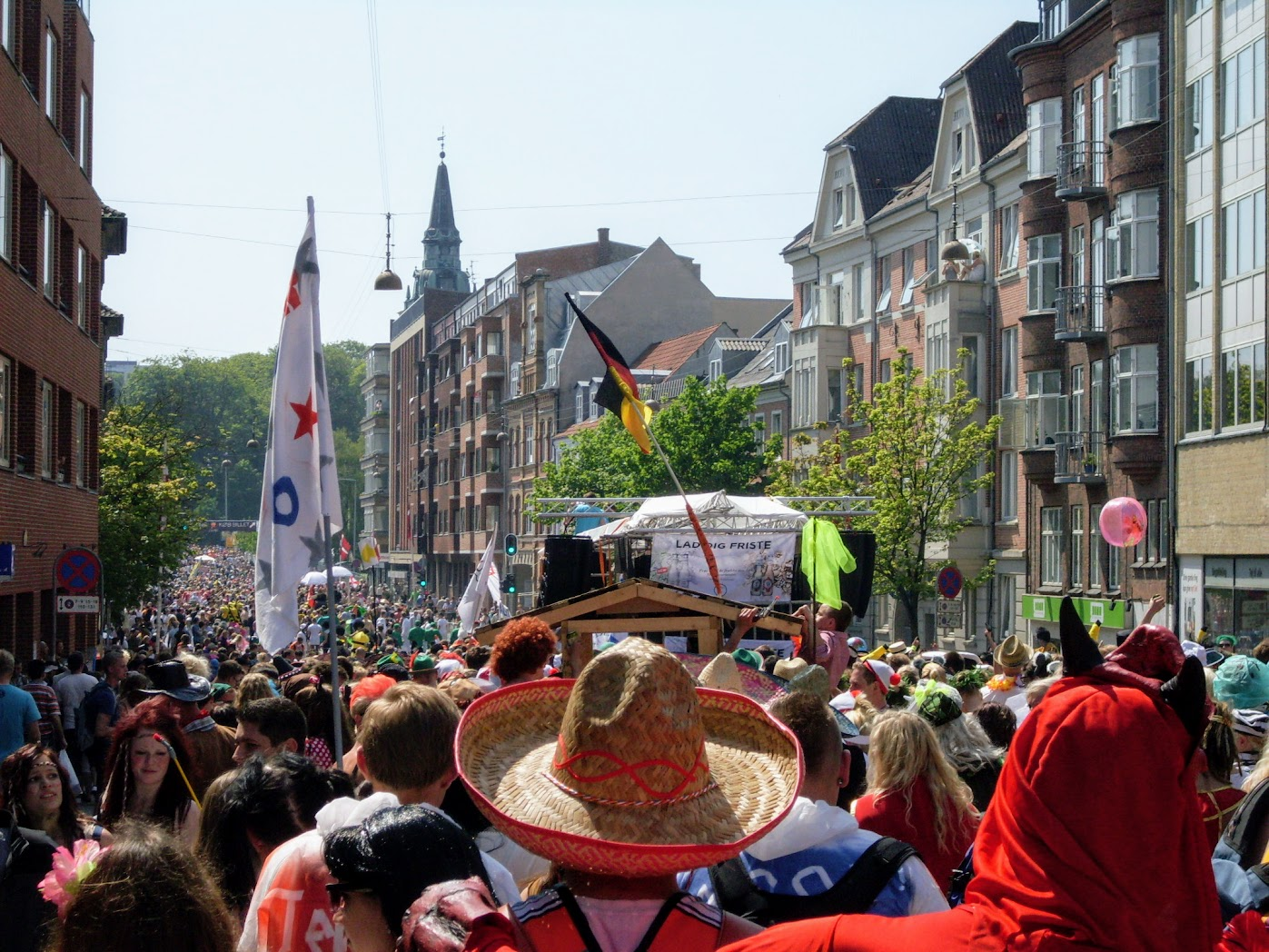
Aalborg Carnival in 2011

Aalborg Carnival is an annual week-long carnival in the city of Aalborg in Denmark. It takes place during the last week in May and is the largest carnival in Scandinavia. It has three main events: The Grand Parade, Battle of Carnival Bands and Children's Carnival.
