= Charcot =

Charcot may refer to:

== People ==
- Jean-Martin Charcot (1825–1893), French neurologist

Jean-Martin Charcot's name is associated with many diseases, anatomical structures and conditions including:

- Charcot–Marie–Tooth disease, a form of peroneal muscular atrophy
- Charcot–Bouchard aneurysms
- Charcot–Leyden crystals
- Charcot's cholangitis triad of symptoms of ascending cholangitis
- Charcot's neurologic triad of symptoms of multiple sclerosis
- Some anterolateral central arteries in the brain are known as Charcot's artery
- Neuropathic arthropathy, Charcot's joint or Charcot foot
- Amyotrophic lateral sclerosis, a motor neurone disease known as both Charcot's disease and Lou Gehrig's disease
- Charcot Wilbrand syndrome or visual agnosia, inability to recognize visual stimuli

- Jean-Baptiste Charcot (1867–1936), French explorer and physician, son of Jean-Martin Charcot

== Places in Antarctica ==
- Charcot Bay
- Charcot Cove
- Charcot Island
- Charcot Plate, a tectonic plate under West Antarctica
- Cape Charcot
- Charcot Station, a French research station in Adélie Land

== See also ==
- Charcot disease (disambiguation)
- Charlot (name)
