= Sharkov =

Sharkov (Russian: Шарков) is not exclusively a Russian masculine surname, its feminine counterpart is Sharkova. It may refer to

- Boris Sharkov (born 1950), Russian physicist
- Olga Sharkova-Sidorova (born 1968), Russian fencer

== See also ==
- 4074 Sharkov, a minor planet
