= Chariot (company) =

On-demand Ford commuter microtransit service in U.S., Europe, closed in 2019

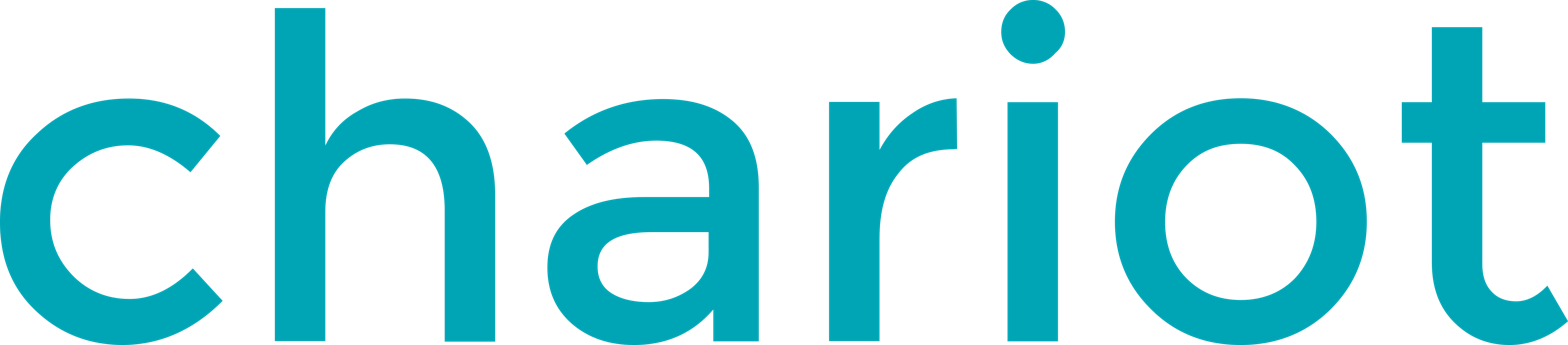

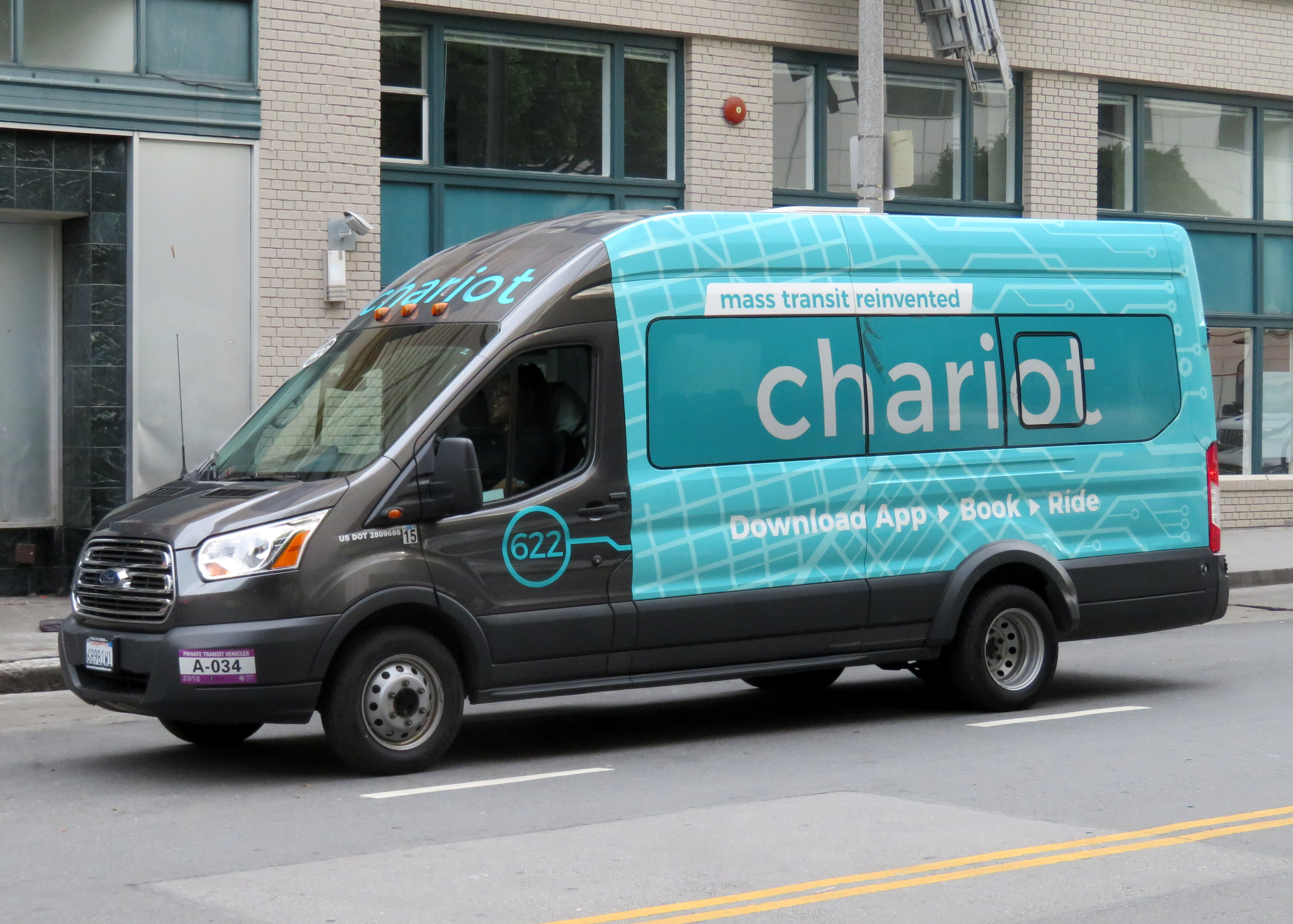
- Chariot van in San Francisco in January 2019
- Founded: March 2014; 12 years ago
- Defunct: February 1, 2019; 7 years ago
- Headquarters: San Francisco
- Service area: San Francisco; New York City; Greater London; Seattle
- Service type: Vanpool; Charter buses
- Chief executive: Dan Grossman

Chariot was a commuter shuttle service owned by the Ford Motor Company. The company's mobile-phone application allowed passengers to ride a shuttle between home and work during commuting hours. Chariot operated in cities in the United States and Europe. New routes were determined based on demographic information and crowdsourced data. The company ceased shuttle operations in February 2019.

== History ==
In March 2014, co-founders Ali Vahabzadeh and Romain Di Vuolo established Chariot after leaving their jobs at a real-estate start-up. After a summer in the nonprofit Tumml incubator, Chariot graduated from the program and expanded San Francisco coverage to the Marina, Financial District, SoMa, and Pacific Heights.

On September 9, 2016, Ford CEO Mark Fields announced that the Ford Motor Company would be acquiring Chariot Transit Inc via their subsidiary Ford Smart Mobility for $65 million. In 2018 Ford Smart Mobility appointed Dan Grossman interim CEO while Ali Vahabzadeh continued to be involved in the company's progress as a board member.

On January 10, 2019, Chariot announced that it would be ceasing operations as of March 2019. The final day of operations was January 25, 2019, in the UK and February 1, 2019, in the US.

== Operation ==
The company operated 14-seat passenger vans along specific fixed routes, operating during weekday morning and evening commute hours only. As of June 2016, the company operated twenty-five routes.

A commuter could access Chariot via a mobile web browser or its iPhone or Android mobile apps. After signing up and purchasing Chariot credits, they used the map to find a pickup stop. The commuter's boarding pass was displayed in the app in the form of a flashing code. As of May 2016, passengers had the option of pay-as-you-go; multi-ride packs of credits, such as $100 in credit for $95; or an all-access pass for $119. There were also pass packages for am-only riders or off-peak riders from $68 and $89 respectively.

== Cities ==
In the United States, Chariot operated in Austin, Texas; Chicago, Illinois; Columbus, Ohio; Denver, Colorado; Detroit, Michigan; Lake Tahoe, Nevada; Los Angeles, California; New York, New York; San Francisco Bay Area, California; and Seattle, Washington.

In Denver, the University of Denver (DU) route was deemed a success. The other route, between downtown, Capitol Hill, and Cherry Creek gave only 110 rides over 2.5 months; the city paid $250,000 for six months of free rides on this route.

In February 2018, Chariot Transit UK Ltd launched four services in Greater London in Kidbrooke, Belvedere, Battersea, and Wandsworth. A fifth service to Stockley Park was proposed later in 2018. Due to poor uptake, Chariot announced that the London services would end in January 2019.
