= Émmanuel Charlot =

French water polo player (born 1966)

Personal information
- Nationality: French
- Born: 30 June 1966 (age 60) Montbéliard, France

Sport
- Sport: Water polo

Émmanuel Charlot (French: [ɛmanyɛl ʃaʁlo]; born 30 June 1966) is a French water polo player. He competed in the men's tournament at the 1992 Summer Olympics.
