= Charioteer =

A charioteer is someone who drives one or a team of horses or other equines from a drawn chariot.

Chariot racing was very popular in Greek and Roman antiquity, continuing through most of the Byzantine Empire. Winning charioteers and team owners could become extremely wealthy and powerful.

Charioteer or Charioteers may also refer to:

- Charioteer of Delphi, The life-size (1.8m) bronze statue of a chariot driver was found in 1896 at the Sanctuary of Apollo in Delphi
- Charioteer (tank), a post-Second World War British tank
- Operation Charioteer, a series of U.S. nuclear tests
- The Charioteer, a novel by Mary Renault
- The Charioteers, an American gospel and pop vocal group from 1930 to 1957

== Astronomy ==
- Auriga (constellation), which is Latin for "the charioteer"

== Film ==
- Saarathi, a 2011 Indian film whose title translates as "Charioteer"
