= The Resistance (AWA Studios) =

American comic book meta series

The Resistance Universe
- Promotional teaser for The Resistance.

Publication information
- Publisher: AWA Studios
- Schedule: March 2020 – present
- Genre: Various

Creative team
- Created by: Mike Deodato; Frank Martin; J. Michael Straczynski
- Written by: Kaare Andrews; Gregg Hurwitz; Michael Moreci; J. Michael Straczynski
- Pencillers: Kaare Andrews; Mike Choi; Mike Deodato; C. P. Smith; Mark Texeira; Alessandro Vitti
- Colorists: Mike Choi; Snakebite Cortez; Frank Martin; Brian Reber; Ive Svorcina

The Resistance Universe is an ongoing American comic book franchise created by J. Michael Straczynski, Mike Deodato and Frank Martin, and is being published by AWA Studios (originally published through its Upshot Studios imprint between 2020 and 2023, before being merged into AWA).

== Premise ==
The Resistance is set in a shared fictional universe, in which humanity faced the Great Death, a pandemic that killed 400 million people, and causes the emergence of over 10 million Reborns, survivors with superhuman powers, as well as the founding of a faction known as the Resistance.

== List of works ==
Title	Issue(s)	Writer(s)	Artist(s)	Colorist(s)	Start date	End date
The Resistance	#1–6	J. Michael Straczynski	Mike Deodato	Frank Martin	March 18, 2020	September 30, 2020
E-Ratic	#1–5	Kaare Andrews		Brian Reber	December 2, 2020	April 27, 2021
The Resistance: Reborns	One-shot	J. Michael Straczynski	C. P. Smith	Snakebite Cortez	January 6, 2021	
The Resistance: Uprising	#1–6	J. Michael Straczynski	C. P. Smith	Snakebite Cortez	April 7, 2021	September 29, 2021
Moths	#1–6	J. Michael Straczynski	Mike Choi		June 2, 2021	November 24, 2021
Knighted	#1–5	Gregg Hurwitz	Mark Texeira	Brian Reber	November 8, 2021	April 20, 2022
The Joneses	#1–5	Michael Moreci	Alessandro Vitti	Ive Svorcina	April 6, 2022	August 31, 2022
E-Ratic 2: Recharged	#1–4	Kaare Andrews		Brian Reber	September 7, 2022	February 8, 2023
U & I	#1–6	J. Michael Straczynski	Mike Choi	Sal Cipriano	February 7, 2024	November 13, 2024

=== The Resistance (2020) ===
The Resistance is the initial series of the franchise, written by J. Michael Straczynski, drawn by Mike Deodato and colored by Frank Martin. The series began on March 18, 2020, and ended on September 30, 2020. Straczynski said he wanted to give readers, especially millennials, something that would impart a measure of hope without "undue cotton candy" while confronting "dead-on" the real challenges people face, comparing the recent paradigm in comic books with the previous paradigms established by DC Comics during the "authoritarian" 1940–1950s and Marvel Comics during the "anti-authoritarian" 1960s. Deodato expressed that The Resistance is "exceptional, even more exciting" than the Netflix series, Sense8, which Straczynski was a writer.

The series received mixed reviews from critics.

=== E-Ratic (2020–2021) ===
E-Ratic is a limited series written and drawn by Kaare Andrews, and colored by Brian Reber. The series began on December 2, 2020, and ended on April 27, 2021. The series tells the story about a teenage high schooler who has just been bestowed with great powers, but he has to fight against interdimensional monsters.

=== The Resistance: Reborns (2021) ===
The Resistance: Reborns is a one-shot issue written by J. Michael Straczynski, drawn by C. P. Smith and colored by Snakebite Cortez. The book was published on January 6, 2021. The issue features an anthology of five stories that happen during the Great Death. Straczynski said he used his previous experience from Babylon 5 to expand The Resistance with other stories and characters through this anthology. Axel Alonso explained that The Resistance, which was created a year prior to the COVID-19 pandemic, somehow predicted the current issues in the world, considering it "the X-Men of the 21st century".

=== The Resistance: Uprising (2021) ===
The Resistance: Uprising is the sequel of The Resistance, written by J. Michael Straczynski, drawn by C. P. Smith and colored by Snakebite Cortez. The series began on April 7, 2021, and ended on September 29, 2021. Straczynski explained that while The Resistance was written prior to the COVID-19 pandemic, Uprising was written before the political events of December 2020–January 2021. Smith described the book as "an allegory of our times." Alonso added that Uprising "is about maintaining hope during hopeless times. It's about people who look past their differences, recognize their common humanity, and refuse to surrender their values in an increasingly corrupt time."

The series received mixed reviews from critics.

=== Moths (2021) ===
Moths is a limited series written by Straczynski, and drawn and colored by artist Mike Choi. The series began on June 2, 2021, and ended on November 24, 2021. Straczynski and Alonso said the series follows a young woman who, although she survives the pandemic, her lifespan is instead reduced by the abilities she receives. Choi said he "wanted to paint a book that was very much grounded in realism so that while the idea of 'superpowers' felt extraordinary, the characters' reactions to them were very ordinary. The characters in Moths are people who should reflect us and our experiences so that we can relate to them as much as possible, so how they're depicted and described are geared specifically towards that goal."

=== Knighted (2021–2022) ===
Knighted is a limited series written by Gregg Hurwitz, drawn by Mark Texeira and colored by Brian Reber. The series began on November 8, 2021, and ended on April 20, 2022. Hurwitz said he was inspired by Stan Lee and Steve Ditko's run on Spider-Man, as well as Mark Millar and John Romita Jr's run on Kick-Ass, and the two years Hurwitz spent writing Batman. This led him to the idea about what if the original superhero was a very bad person, while the protagonist was pure of heart but much too meek for his own good. Alonso said, "with Knighted, Gregg and Mark are deconstructing and, in fact, reinventing an all-too familiar super-hero paradigm in the context of a brand-new shared universe that's rooted in the 21st Century."

=== The Joneses (2022) ===
The Joneses is a limited series written by Mike Moreci, drawn by Alessandro Vitti and colored by Ive Svorcina. The series began on April 6, 2022, and ended on August 31, 2022. Moreci announced the series is focused on an interracial family with powers, with elements inspired in the Fantastic Four and The Incredibles.

=== E-Ratic 2: Recharged (2022–2023) ===
E-Ratic 2: Recharged is the sequel of E-Ratic, written and drawn by Kaare Andrews, and colored by Brian Reber. The series began on September 7, 2022, and ended on February 8, 2023. The story follows the main character teaming up with a barbarian princess who claims to be from another dimension.

=== U & I (2024) ===
U & I is a limited series written by J. Michael Straczynski, drawn by Moths artist Mike Choi and colored by Sal Cipriano. The series began on February 7, 2024, and ended on November 13, 2024. The story follows a woman with bad luck who falls in love with a Reborn vigilante while escaping from a crime syndicate.

== Collected editions ==
Title	Material collected	Pages	Publication date	ISBN
The Resistance, Vol.1	The Resistance #1–6	144	October 20, 2020	1733499318, 978-1733499316
E-Ratic, Vol. 1	E-Ratic #1–5	122	June 22, 2021	1953165095, 978-1953165091
The Resistance, Vol. 2: Uprising	The Resistance: Uprising #1–6	144	November 9, 2021	1953165222, 978-1953165220
Moths	Moths #1–6	144	February 8, 2022	1953165249, 978-1953165244
Knighted, Vol. 1	Knighted #1–5	115	June 7, 2022	1953165311, 978-1953165312
The Joneses, Vol. 1	The Joneses #1–5	128	October 18, 2022	1953165389, 978-1953165381
The Resistance Universe: The Origins	E-Ratic #1; E-Ratic 2: Recharged #1; The Joneses #1; Knighted #1; Moths #1; The Resistance #1–6; The Resistance: Reborns; The Resistance: Uprising #1	368	December 13, 2022	195316546X, 978-1953165466
E-Ratic, Vol. 2: Recharged	E-Ratic 2: Recharged #1–4	112	March 21, 2023	1953165443, 978-1953165442
U & I	U & I	160	January 22, 2025	1953165583, 978-1953165589
