= Bernard Charlot =

French academic and educational scientist (1944–2025)

- Born: 15 September 1944; Paris, France
- Died: 3 December 2025 (aged 81); Aracaju, Sergipe, Brazil
- Education: École normale supérieure de Fontenay-Saint-Cloud (AES)
- Occupations: Academic; Educational scientist

Bernard Charlot (English: /ʃɑːrˈloʊ/ shar-LOH, French: [bɛʁnaʁ ʃaʁlo]; 15 September 1944 – 3 December 2025) was a French academic and educational scientist.

Charlot notably taught at Paris 8 University and the Federal University of Sergipe and founded the educational science think tank EScol in 1987.

Charlot died in Aracaju on 3 December 2025, at the age of 81.

== Publications ==
- La mystification pédagogique : réalités sociales et processus idéologiques dans la théorie de l'éducation (1976)
- Faire des mathématiques : le plaisir du sens (1991)
- École et savoir dans les banlieues et ailleurs (1992)
- L'école et le territoire : nouveaux espaces, nouveaux enjeux (1994)
- Les sciences de l'éducation, un enjeu (1995)
- Du rapport au savoir, éléments pour une théorie (1997)
- Les jeunes, l'insertion, l'emploi (1998)
- Le rapport au savoir en milieu populaire. Une recherche dans les lycées professionnels de banlieue (1999)
- "Rapport au savoir, lutte contre les inégalités scolaires et politiques éducatives : comment penser les rapports entre devenir collectif et histoire singulière" (2000)
- "La problématique du rapport au savoir" (2000)
- Les jeunes et le savoir : perspectives internationales (2001)
- "La notion de rapport au savoir : points d'ancrage théorique et fondements anthropologiques" (2001)
- "Éducation ou Barbarie. Pour une Anthropologie-Pédagogie Contemporaine" (2020)
