= AWA Studios =

American comic book publishing company

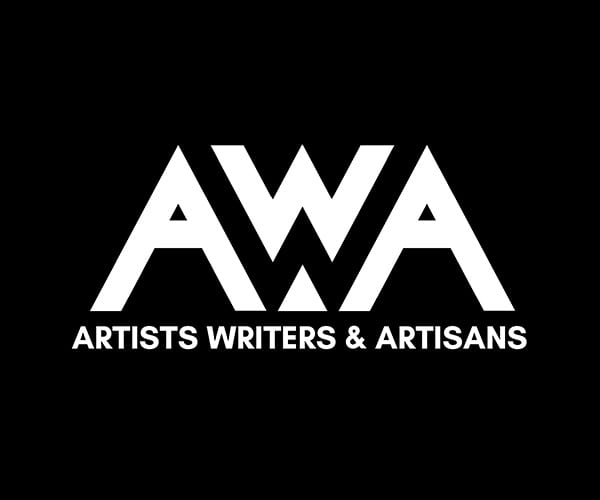
- Status: Active
- Founded: November 2018; 7 years ago
- Founder: Axel Alonso; Bill Jemas; Jonathan Miller
- Country of origin: United States
- Headquarters location: New York City
- Distribution: Simon & Schuster (books)
- Key people: Axel Alonso (CCO); Matthew Anderson (CEO); Zach Studin (President, AWA Studios); Jonathan F. Miller (chair)
- Publication types: Comics Graphic Novels
- Fiction genres: Action; Adventure; Horror; Thriller
- Imprints: AWA
- Owners: Lightspeed Venture Partners; Lupa Systems; SISTER; Fremantle
- Official website: Official website

Artists Writers & Artisans, Inc. or AWA Studios is an American independent comic book publisher founded in November 2018 by Axel Alonso, Bill Jemas and Jonathan F. Miller.

== History ==
AWA Studios was founded in November 2018 by Axel Alonso and Bill Jemas from Marvel Comics, with the addition of Jonathan F. Miller from Fandom, with Jemas as chief executive officer, Alonso as Chief Creative Officer, and Miller as a Senior Council member. The initials in the company's name stand for "Artists Writers & Artisans". Initial funders included Lightspeed Venture Partners and James Murdoch's Lupa Systems. Elisabeth Murdoch's SISTER media investment firm also contributed funding in March 2020 and Fremantle contributed funding in February 2023. Over time, a Creative Council was joined by J. Michael Straczynski, Reginald Hudlin, Garth Ennis, Gregg Hurwitz, Margaret Stohl and Frank Cho.

American Ronin was presented as a potential book from AWA in June 2019. In August 2019, Straczynski announced a new shared universe for AWA, debuting in 2020 with The Resistance. During New York Comic Con 2019, AWA released Upshot Now No. 0. AWA Studios premiered with four titles, released in March 2020 under its Upshot imprint.

In June 2021, AWA announced the foundation of its own film/TV division, being helmed by Zach Studin as president. AWA is in production on the feature film Liminal, a sci-fi action thriller, directed by Louis Letterier, with actors Yahya Abdul-Mateen II and Vanessa Kirby attached. Liminal is based on the AWA graphic novel Telepaths.

Since 2023, the Upshot Studios imprint was merged into AWA.

In June 2024, AWA announced an alliance with Vertigo Entertainment to create a new horror storytelling pipeline called FUTURE OF FEAR.

== Key people ==
=== Leadership team ===
- Axel Alonso, co-founder & chief creative officer (2018–present)
- Jonathan F. Miller, co-founder & co-chairman of the board (2018–present)
- Zach Studin, president, AWA Studios (2021–present)
- Matthew Anderson, co-chairman of the board & chief executive officer (2022–present)
- Diya Sagar, chief financial officer (2023–present)

=== Creative council ===
- J. Michael Straczynski (2018–present)
- Reginald Hudlin (2018–present)
- Garth Ennis (2018–2022)
- Gregg Hurwitz (2018–present)
- Margaret Stohl (2018–2022)
- Frank Cho (2018–2022)
- Laeta Kalogridis (2022–present)
- Joseph Kosinski (2022–present)
- Al Madrigal (2022–present)

== Imprints ==
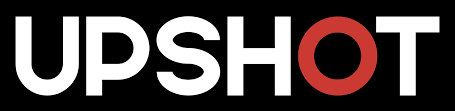
Upshot imprint logo

=== Current ===
- AWA

=== Former ===
- iPOP
- Lesser Evils
- Upshot Studios (merged into AWA)
