= Axel Alonso =

American comic book creator

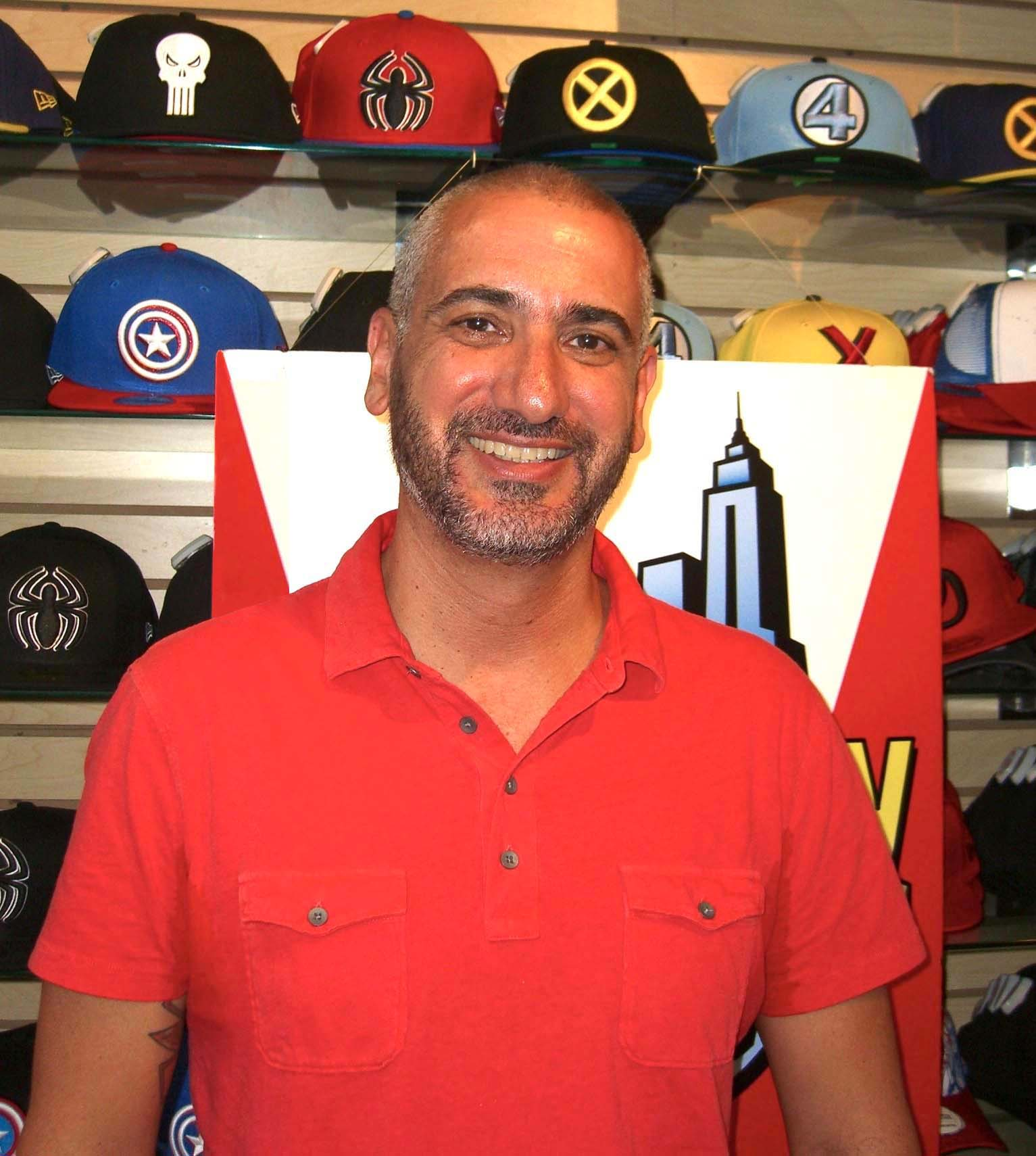
- Alonso at a "Meet the Publishers" Q&A at Midtown Comics Downtown, April 14, 2011
- Born: San Francisco, California, U.S.
- Area: Editor
- Awards: 2004 Eagle Award for Favorite Comics Editor; 2006 Eagle Award for Favorite Comics Editor; 2010 Eagle Award for Favorite Comics Editor
- Children: 1

Axel Alonso (/əˈlɒnzoʊ/) is an American comic book creator and former journalist, best known as the former editor in chief at Marvel Comics, a role which he held from January 2011 until November 2017. Alonso began his career as a journalist for New York's Daily News. He also worked as an editor at DC Comics from 1994 to 2000, during which he edited a number of books published under their Vertigo line, such as Doom Patrol, Animal Man, Hellblazer, Preacher, and 100 Bullets. In 2000, he went to work for Marvel Comics as a senior editor. While there, he edited Spider-Man and X-Men-related books before ascending to vice president, executive editor in 2010, and editor in chief in January 2011, replacing Joe Quesada. He has also worked as a writer and inker.

== Early life ==
Alonso's father is from Mexico, and his mother is from England. A native of San Francisco, Alonso earned a bachelor's degree in sociology and politics from University of California, Santa Cruz and a master's degree in journalism from Columbia University.

== Career ==
Alonso began his career as a journalist for New York's Daily News. He also worked as a magazine editor before he entered the comic book industry. One day, he saw an ad in The New York Times for DC Comics editors and thought it would be fun to interview, never thinking he would actually be offered a job, though he ended up being hired by the publisher.

Alonso's first published work for DC Comics was Doom Patrol #80 and Animal Man #73, which were published in July 1994, the latter of which was part of the company's Vertigo line, which publishes books in genres such as horror and fantasy aimed at mature readers. Other Vertigo titles he edited until 1999 included Garth Ennis' Preacher, Black Orchid, Kid Eternity, Hellblazer, Unknown Soldier, 100 Bullets, and Human Target.

In late September 2000 Alonso went to work at DC's main competition, Marvel Comics, as senior editor where he worked on Spider-Man books such as The Amazing Spider-Man and Peter Parker: Spider-Man. His first published work as editor was The Amazing Spider-Man trade paperback that collected issues #30 - 32 of that title, and was published in 2001.

Alonso spent more than a decade as an editor at Marvel, working on some of its most notable characters. In 2001, he began editing The Amazing Spider-Man. He would continue on the title during J. Michael Straczynski's critically acclaimed run on the title, which began in 2001. It was also in 2001 that Alonso helped to create the a Marvel MAX line for mature readers.

In 2002, Alonso, then a senior editor, had lured Frank Cho to Marvel on the basis of Cho's comic strip series Liberty Meadows. Alonso approached Cho to revamp the third-string character Shanna the She-Devil, a scantily clad jungle girl whom Cho recast in a seven-issue, 2005 miniseries as an Amazonian naïf, the product of a Nazi experiment with the power to kill dinosaurs with her bare hands but an unpredictable lack of morality.

Alonso is also credited with bringing crime writers to work on Marvel titles including Duane Swierczynski and Victor Gischler.

Alonso edited stories featuring the Western character Rawhide Kid, the first of which was the 2003 biweekly Marvel Max miniseries Rawhide: Slap Leather by Ron Zimmerman and John Severin, which drew controversy for its depiction of the titular character as a homosexual, albeit through the use of innuendo in the book's design and dialogue. The series was labeled with a "Parental Advisory Explicit Content" warning on the cover. Alonso stated of the miniseries, "We thought it would be interesting to play with the genre. Enigmatic cowboy rides into dusty little desert town victimized by desperadoes, saves the day, wins everyone's heart, then rides off into the sunset, looking better than any cowboy has a right to." Alonso would later edit the 2010 miniseries Rawhide Kid: The Sensational Seven by Zimmerman and Howard Chaykin.

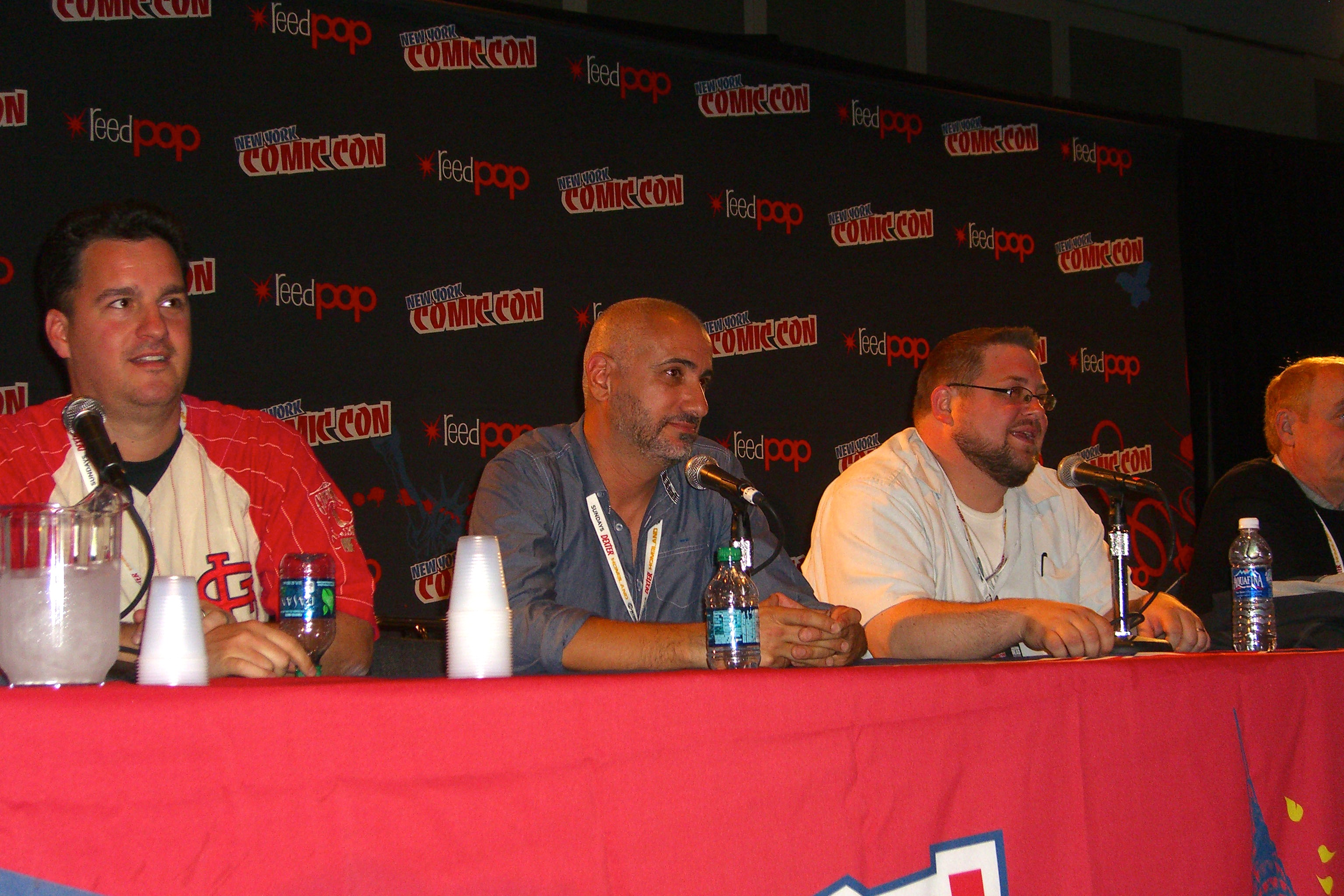
Alonso (center) during the Marvel NOW! panel at the 2012 New York Comic Con. Seated with him from left to right are editor Steve Wacker, C. B. Cebulski and (barely visible) Jeph Loeb.

Although primarily an editor, Alonso also wrote Spider-Man: One More Day Sketchbook, a 2007 tie-in book to the "Spider-Man: One More Day" storyline, and inked issues 3 and 4 of the 2008 miniseries NYX: No Way Home.

Alonso would also oversee critically acclaimed runs on X-Men, such as "X-Men: Messiah Complex" (2007–08) and "Curse of the Mutants" (2010–11).

He was promoted to vice president, executive editor in early 2010, and oversaw cross-promotional projects such an issue of the ESPN The Magazine, which depicted several NBA basketball players as Marvel superheroes. The issue was published in October 2010 by ESPN, which like Marvel, is owned by parent company Disney.

In July 2010 Alonso and fellow Marvel Editor Tom Brevoort began a weekly column on Comic Book Resources called "Marvel T&A", a new installment of which appears every Friday, along with Joe Quesada's "Cup O' Joe" column.

On January 4, 2011, Alonso was named editor in chief of Marvel Comics, replacing Joe Quesada, who was named chief creative officer the previous June. In attaining the position of editor in chief, he became only the third person in 15 years to hold the position, and one of the few in the company's history to gain it "without tumult or corporate bloodshed".

The last few years of Alonso's tenure as editor in chief saw Marvel deal with both dwindling sales and public controversies. In May 2016 a storyline that saw Captain America transformed by timeline manipulation into a double agent for the evil, Nazi-like organization Hydra prompted such criticism that Marvel released a statement indicating to readers the character would eventually be reverted to his original benevolent, patriotic identity, which occurred in August 2017. In April 2017 Marvel was subject to substantial criticism on social media after statements made by Vice President of Sales David Gabriel in an interview with ICv2 were understood to mean that retailers attributed poor sales of Marvel books to the company's effort to promote diversity with prominent non-white and non-male characters in starring roles in its books. Gabriel later clarified his words, and stated that Marvel was not abandoning such characters. On November 17, 2017, in the wake of these of controversies, Marvel announced Alonso's replacement as editor in chief by C. B. Cebulski. No reason, however, was given for Alonso's departure or future career plans, though Marvel indicated that Alonso's departure was mutual. In a statement on Twitter, Marvel stated, "Axel Alonso leaves an incredible mark at Marvel. His vision shaped some of our most iconic Super Heroes and stories. We wish him the best."

In 2019, Alonso founded a new comics publisher, Artists, Writers and Artisans as the chief creative officer of AWA Studios, reuniting him with former Marvel Publisher Bill Jemas. The publisher announced that its first slate of titles would include books by creators such as Peter Milligan, Frank Cho, and Christa Faust. One of its early publications was The Resistance, a miniseries by J. Michael Straczynski and Mike Deodato, which depicts a global pandemic caused by a pathogen that kills 95 percent of those infected, leaving the remaining 5 percent with superhuman abilities. The series, which was intended to establish a new superhero universe, debuted on March 18, 2020, as the COVID-19 pandemic was taking hold in the United States. The series garnered positive reviews, achieved a rating of 9.0 out of 10 at the review aggregator website Comic Book Roundup, based on 20 reviews.

== Personal life ==
Alonso and his wife have a son named Tito who was 11 as of March 2014.

== Awards ==
=== Wins ===
- 2004 Eagle Award for Favourite Comics Editor
- 2005 Wizard Fan Award for Favorite Editor (Amazing Spider-Man)
- 2006 Eagle Award for Favourite Comics Editor
- 2010 Eagle Award for Favourite Comics Editor

=== Nominations ===
- 2007 Eagle Award for Favourite Comics Editor
- 2008 Eagle Award for Favourite Comics Editor

Preceded by Joe Quesada	Marvel Comics Editor-in-Chief; 2011–2017	Succeeded by C. B. Cebulski
