= Spidey and His Amazing Friends =

2021 Disney Junior superhero series

- Promotional poster for the first season of the series. Clockwise from the top left: Spin, Ghost-Spider, Spidey, and TRACE-E.
- Also known as: Spidey and His Amazing Friends: Glow Webs Glow (first two thirds of season 2; episodes 1–2, 6, 8, 10, 15–16, 23 and 28); Spidey and His Amazing Friends: Web-Spinners (final third of season 2 (episodes 24–25, 27 and 29) and first half of season 3 (episodes 1–14); Spidey and His Amazing Friends: Dino-Webs (second half of season 3 (episodes 15–30); episodes 2–6 of season 4); Spidey and His Amazing Friends: Water-Webs (episodes 1 and 7–19 of season 4); Spidey and His Amazing Friends: Rescue-Webs (season 5)
- Genre: Preschool; Superhero
- Based on: Spider-Man by: Stan Lee; Steve Ditko
- Showrunner: Harrison Wilcox
- Directed by: Darren Bachynski (seasons 1–2); Mitch Stookey (season 3–present)
- Voices of: Benjamin Valic; Alkaio Thiele; Nick A. Fisher; Jakari Fraser; Carter Young; Lily Sanfelippo; Audrey Bennett; Dee Bradley Baker; Nicholas Roye
- Theme music composer: Patrick Stump
- Opening theme: "Spidey and His Amazing Friends Theme", written and performed by Patrick Stump
- Ending theme: "Spidey and His Amazing Friends Theme" (Instrumental) (episodes 1–68); "Do the Spidey", written by Patrick Stump and Harrison Willcox and performed by Patrick Stump (episode 69–present)
- Composer: Patrick Stump
- Countries of origin: United States; Canada
- Original language: English
- No. of seasons: 5
- No. of episodes: 113 (list of episodes)

Production
- Executive producer: Harrison Wilcox
- Editor: Bec Cranswick
- Running time: 22 minutes (11 minutes per segment)
- Production companies: Marvel Animation (season 1); Marvel Studios Animation (season 2–present) (Note: credited simply as Marvel; Animation outsourced to Atomic Cartoons)

Original release
- Network: Disney Jr.
- Release: August 6, 2021 – present

Related
- Iron Man and His Awesome Friends

Spidey and His Amazing Friends, also known as Marvel's Spidey and His Amazing Friends, is a preschool animated television series produced by Marvel Studios Animation (formerly Marvel Animation) and animated by Atomic Cartoons (who also produced Marvel Super Hero Adventures), which premiered on Disney Jr. on August 6, 2021. The show features young versions of the Marvel characters and is the first full-length Marvel animated series targeted at young audiences.

The series has been consistently renewed for additional seasons prior to their premieres. On August 15, 2026, the show was renewed for a seventh season.

A spin-off series, Iron Man and His Awesome Friends, premiered on August 11, 2025. Three days before its premiere, another upcoming spin-off, Avengers: Mightiest Friends, was announced in August 2025 and is slated to premiere in 2027.

== Plot ==
The series follows the adventures of grade school kid incarnations of Peter Parker / Spidey, Gwen Stacy / Ghost-Spider, and Miles Morales / Spin and as they fight villains across New York City such as Rhino, Doc Ock, her Octobot partner CAL, her Octobots, Green Goblin, Electro, Black Cat, Sandman, Zola, his Hydrabots, Lizard, Trapster, Hydro-Man, Symbie, and Swarm.

Spidey, Spin, and Ghost-Spider would sometimes receive aid from other superheroes such as Black Panther, Ms. Marvel, her dog Lockjaw, Hulk, Iron Man, Ant-Man, Wasp, Reptil, Thing, his partners H.E.R.B.I.E. and Mr. Fantastic, Squirrel Girl, her sidekick Tippy-Toe, White Tiger, Captain America, Jeff the Land Shark, Rocket Raccoon, his partner Groot, and Silk.

== Episodes ==
Season	Segments	Episodes	Originally released	
Season	Segments	Episodes	First released	Last released
1	50	25	August 6, 2021	July 8, 2022
2	58	29	August 19, 2022	November 10, 2023
3	60	30	January 8, 2024	April 11, 2025
4	38	19	June 16, 2025	May 1, 2026
5	TBA	TBA	July 13, 2026	TBA

== Characters ==
=== Team Spidey ===
- Peter Parker / Spidey (voiced by Benjamin Valic in seasons 1–2, Alkaio Thiele in seasons 3–4, Nick A. Fisher in season 5–present) – The titular web-slinging superhero. He often works on different science experiments and new types of webbing. When Spidey accesses his Dino-Web abilities during season 3, he can change at will into a Tyrannosaurus, alternatively referred to as Spidey-Rex.
  - WEB-STER (voiced by Nicholas Roye) – A super-computer in Web-Quarters that assists Spidey, Spin, and Ghost-Spider.
  - TRACE-E (vocal effects provided by Dee Bradley Baker) – A Spider-Bot who is Spidey's sidekick.
- Miles Morales / Spin (voiced by Jakari Fraser in seasons 1–3, Carter Young in season 4–present) – Peter's best friend who possesses invisibility and an arachno-sting ability. Miles is an expert artist. When accessing his Dino-Web abilities during season 3, he can change at will into a Stegosaurus, alternatively referred to as Dino-Spin.
  - TWIST-E (vocal effects provided by Dee Bradley Baker) – A Spider-Bot who is Spin's sidekick.
- Gwen Stacy / Ghost-Spider (voiced by Lily Sanfelippo in seasons 1–2, Audrey Bennett in season 3–present) – A friend of Peter and Miles. Gwen is an expert drummer and her Ghost-Spider outfit enables her with gliding abilities. When accessing her Dino-Web powers during season 3, she can change at will into a Pterodactyl, alternatively referred to as Ghostosaurus.
  - TWIRL-E (vocal effects provided by Nora Wyman) – A Spider-Bot who is Ghost-Spider's sidekick.

=== Supporting ===
- Aunt May (voiced by Melanie Minichino) – Peter's paternal aunt.
- Rio Morales (voiced by Gabrielle Ruiz) – Miles' mother who is an ER doctor.
- Jeff Morales (né Davis) (voiced by Eugene Byrd) – Miles' father who is a police officer for the NYPD.
- Helen Stacy (voiced by Kari Wahlgren) – Gwen's mother who is a detective for the NYPD.
- George Stacy (voiced by Scott Porter) – Gwen's father who is a police captain for the NYPD.
- Gloria Morales (voiced by Sophia Ramos) – Miles' grandmother who lives in Puerto Rico.
- Petunia Grimm (voiced by Jackie Hoffman) – The aunt of Thing.
- Billie Morales (voiced by Kayleigh Rayne) – Miles' little sister.

=== Superhero allies ===
- Ms. Marvel (voiced by Sandra Saad) – An Inhuman who can extend her limbs. Saad reprises her role from the 2020 video game adaptation of The Avengers.
  - Lockjaw (vocal effects provided by Dee Bradley Baker) – Ms. Marvel's pet Inhuman bulldog who is capable of teleporting himself and others.
- Black Panther (voiced by Tru Valentino (Note: The child version from Iron Man and His Awesome Friends is voiced by Cruz Flateau in both Spidey and Iron Man: Avengers Team-Up! and Spidey and the Avengers: Halloween Team-Up!)) – The king of Wakanda.
- Hulk (voiced by Armen Taylor as an adult, Sami Sharkaway as a toddler in "Lil' Hulk") – A monstrous superhero with gamma-powered super-strength.
- Tony Stark / Iron Man (voiced by John Stamos (Note: The child version from Iron Man and His Awesome Friends is voiced by Mason Blomberg in Spidey and Iron Man: Avengers Team-Up! and Lincoln Bonilla in Spidey and the Avengers: Halloween Team-Up!)) – An armored Avenger superhero who is the CEO of Stark Industries. He granted Team Spidey their Web-Spinner suits during Season 2.
- Ant-Man (voiced by Sean Giambrone) – A superhero who can communicate with ants, change his size thanks to the Pym Particles he created, and possesses the strength of an ant.
- Wasp (voiced by Maya Tuttle) – A superhero who can fly and change her size with the same particles. She is Ant-Man's partner.
- Reptil (voiced by Hoku Ramirez in season 2, Ryan Anderson Lopez in season 3-4) – A superhero who can become different dinosaurs. He granted Team Spidey their Dino-Web suits during Season 3.
- Ben Grimm / Thing (voiced by Andy Milder) – A rock-skinned member of the Fantastic Four with super-strength.
  - H.E.R.B.I.E. (voiced by Tim Dadabo) – Thing's helper robot.
  - Mister Fantastic (voiced by Mario Lopez) – The leader of the Fantastic Four, capable of stretching and altering his body's shape.
- Squirrel Girl (voiced by Emma Berman) – A female squirrel-themed superhero.
  - Tippy-Toe (vocal effects provided by Darin De Paul) – A squirrel who is Squirrel Girl's best friend and sidekick.
- White Tiger (voiced by Kylie Cantrall) – A female white tiger-themed superhero. In this show, her amulet also enables her to talk to animals.
- Moon Girl (voiced by Diamond White) – A female superhero who specializes in using gadgets such as her Bubble Blaster. White reprises her role from Moon Girl and Devil Dinosaur (2023–2025).
  - Devil Dinosaur (vocal effects provided by Fred Tatasciore) – A male horned Tyrannosaurus-like dinosaur who is Moon Girl's partner. Tatasciore reprises his role from Moon Girl and Devil Dinosaur (2023–2025).
- Jeff the Land Shark (vocal effects provided by Rama Vallury) – A male shark with four legs.
- Steve Rogers / Captain America (voiced by Roger Craig Smith) – A male patriotic superhero who wields a shield and rides a motorcycle. Craig Smith reprises his role from previous Marvel media adaptations, most notably in Marvel's Avengers Assemble (2013–2019).
- Rocket Raccoon (voiced by Trevor Devall) – An anthropomorphic raccoon from Halfworld. Devall reprises his role from previous Marvel media adaptations, most notably in Marvel's Guardians of the Galaxy (2015–2019) and Marvel Super Hero Adventures (2017–2020).
  - Groot (voiced by Kevin Michael Richardson) – A baby Flora colossus and Rocket's best friend. Richardson reprises his role from previous Marvel media adaptations, most notably in Marvel's Guardians of the Galaxy (2015–2019).
- Cindy Moon / Silk (voiced by Avelyn Choi) – A girl with spider-like abilities.

=== Villains ===
- Doc Ock (voiced by Kelly Ohanian) – A female supervillain with mechanical tentacles, she is an original incarnation of the character based on Carolyn Trainer. In the episode "Ghost in the Museum", she takes on the disguise of Cyrilla Calypso.
  - Octobots – A group of octopus-themed robots that work for Doc Ock.
    - CAL (vocal effects provided by Dee Bradley Baker) – Doc Ock's Octobot minion.
  - Fake TRACE-E (vocal effects provided by Dee Bradley Baker) – Doc Ock's evil version of TRACE-E. He was credited as "Bad Bot".
  - Evil WEB-STER (voiced by Nicholas Roye) – Doc Ock's evil version of WEB-STER controlled by an Octo-Bug.
  - Smashorator (voiced by Dee Bradley Baker) – Doc Ock's smashing machine.
- Green Goblin (voiced by J. P. Karliak) – A male goblin-themed supervillain who rides on a glider and throws pumpkin bombs (referred to as "pumpkin pranks"). Green Goblin has occasionally been transformed into a Velociraptor, alternatively referred to as Gobby-Raptor. In the episode "Gobby and Rhino's Webby Adventure", he steals Team Spidey's Web-Shooters, dons a Spidey-like costume and calls himself Scare-rantula.
  - Corn Dog King (voiced by Kevin Michael Richardson) – Green Goblin's corn dog robot.
  - Blue Goblin (also voiced by J. P. Karliak) – Green Goblin's blue clone created by his Copy-Me-Scanner.
  - Yellow Goblin (also voiced by J. P. Karliak) – Green Goblin's yellow clone created by his Copy-Me-Scanner.
- Rhino (voiced by Justin Shenkarow) – A male rhinoceros-themed supervillain. Rhino has occasionally been transformed into a Triceratops, alternatively referred to as Dino-Rhino. In the episode "Gobby and Rhino's Webby Adventure", he steals Team Spidey's Web-Shooters, dons a Spidey-like costume and calls himself Baddie Long Legs.
- Electro (voiced by Stephanie Lemelin) – A female supervillain with electrokinesis and flight. Electro has occasionally been transformed into a Dilophosaurus, alternatively referred to as Electrosaurus, which sports a retractable neck frill like the Dilophosaurus from the Jurassic Park franchise.
- Felicia Hardy / Black Cat (voiced by Jaiden Klein) – A young female thief who dresses like a cat.
- Sandman (voiced by Thomas F. Wilson) – A male sand-based supervillain who can generate, control, and become sand.
- Zola (voiced by Trevor Devall) – A male robotic supervillain who can possess electronics. When under the control of Green Goblin and Rhino, he becomes Gob-Zola and Rhino-Zola respectfully.
  - Hydrabots – A group of Zola-themed robots that work for Zola.
    - Main Hydrabot (voiced by Jonathan Lipow) – The leader of the Hydrabots.
    - Small Hydrabot (voiced by Bob Bergen) – The smallest of the Hydrabots.
    - Tall Hydrabot (voiced by Sainty Nelsen) – The tallest of the Hydrabots.
- Lizard (voiced by Bumper Robinson) – A male lizard-like supervillain who makes use of different potions.
  - Lance (voiced by Fred Tatasciore) – A pink iguana on Legarto Island who was temporarily mutated into an anthropomorphic form by Lizard's potion.
  - Larry (voiced by Kevin Michael Richardson) – A pink iguana on Legato Island who was temporarily mutated into an anthropomorphic form by Lizard's potion.
  - Lucia (voiced by Kari Wahlgren) – A pink iguana on Legarto Island who was temporarily mutated into an anthropomorphic form by Lizard's potion.
- Trapster (voiced by Deva Marie Gregory) – A female supervillain with trapping abilities.
  - Backpack – A backpack used by Trapster that can fly and possesses an artificial intelligence.
- Hydro-Man (voiced by Haley Joel Osment) – A male water-based supervillain who can generate, control, and become water.
- Symbie (voiced by Ben Pronsky) – A small mischievous male Symbiote child who can shapeshift and splatter black slime.
  - Blobbies (voiced by Ben Pronsky) – A group of tiny Symbiote children that work for Symbie.
- Swarm (voiced by Vanessa Bayer) – A female supervillain in insect-themed armor that sports retractable wings. She wields a Zzepter to control her robotic creations. Bayer reprises her role from Iron Man and His Awesome Friends (2025–present).
  - Robot Bugs – An assortment of robotic insects who work for Swarm.

=== Other characters ===
- Mitch (voiced by Percy Baldwin) – A 6-year-old boy.
- Fitzhue Von Carnegie (voiced by John Eric Bentley) – The curator of the museum.
- Wendy Woodword (voiced by Sainty Nelsen) – The head librarian at New York City's library.
- Isla Coralton (voiced by Bindi Irwin) – An oceanographer that works at the local aquarium.
- Tabitha (voiced by Alessandra Perez in season 2, Abril Bellido in season 4) – A kid who is a fan of Team Spidey.
- Tabitha's Mom (voiced by Dolores Salazar Cruz) – The unnamed mother of Tabitha.
- The Mayor (voiced by Melique Berger) – The unnamed Mayor of New York City.
- Junkyard Jerry (voiced by Hayden Bishop) – The owner of the city junkyard where Hulk's Smash Yard is located.
- Ms. Kimanthi (voiced by Kittie KaBoom) – A zookeeper.
- Mr. Kim (voiced by Tim Dang in season 2, Eric Bauza in season 3-4) – The owner of the New York City's community center.
- Announcer (voiced by Patrick Stump) – The unnamed announcer of a concert and other events.
- Simon (voiced by Dee Bradley Baker) – A kid who plays the bagpipes.
  - Simon's Mom (voiced by Stephanie Lemelin) – The unnamed mother of Simon.
- Mo (voiced by Pej Vahdat) – The owner of the pizza place.
- Will (voiced by Dawson Griffin) – A kid who is a fan of Team Spidey.
- Lizzy (voiced by Lola Keaton in season 2, Kayla Melikian in season 3) – Will's twin sister who is also a fan of Team Spidey.
- Jake (voiced by Jaiden Alexander McLeod) – A kid who is a fan of Team Spidey.
- Seán (voiced by Jaiden Alexander McLeod) - A kid who is a fan of Team Spidey.
- Casey (voiced by Drake Yu) – A kid who is a fan of Team Spidey.
- Gordy (voiced by Vince Lozano) – A citizen.
- Ari (voiced by Darby Winn) – A kid who is a fan of Team Spidey.
  - Mr. Rosenberg (voiced by Robert Cait) – Ari's father.
- Andy (voiced by Darby Winn) – A kid who is a fan of Team Spidey.
- Ms. Leavenworth (voiced by Sainty Nelsen) – The owner of the bakery.
- Poppy the Bubble Lady (voiced by Mo Collins)
- Henry (voiced by John Eric Bentley)
- Ada (voiced by Nazia Chaudhry)
- Shae (voiced by Kai Zen)
- Tabitha (black) (voiced by Amari McCoy)
- Keanu Kielbasa (voiced by Nicholas Roye)
- Imelda (voiced by Nazia Chaudhry)
- Millicent McKeen (voiced by Yvette Nicole Brown) – The proprietor of a bookmobile.
- Marv (voiced by J. P. Karliak)
- Lois (voiced by Kelly Ohanian)
- Charlie (voiced by Scarlett Kate Ferguson)
- Noah (voiced by Jaiden McLeod)
- Mrs. Moriyama (voiced by Lauren Tom)
- Santa Claus (voiced by Kevin Michael Richardson) – A legendary figure who delivers presents on Christmas.
- Bigfoot (vocal effects provided by Fred Tatasciore) – A large, hairy cryptid who inhabits forests.
- Web-Beard (voiced by Trevor Devall as a statue in "The Lost Lair of Web-Beard", David Tennant in "The Return of Web-Beard") – An old pirate who sailed the seven seas. In the episode "The Return of Web-Beard", he comes alive after disappearing many years ago.
- Casey (voiced by Delilah Blomberg)
- Mr. Bretzel (voiced by Trevor Devall) – A pretzel vendor.
- Mr. Derry (voiced by Dave Boat) – An ice cream ventor.
- Farmer John (voiced by Tim Dadabo) – The farmer of the community center.

== Production ==
=== Development ===
Marvel Animation announced its first preschool series Spidey and His Amazing Friends in August 2019. Disney Jr. renewed the series for a second season in August 2021. On June 15, 2022, Disney Jr. renewed the series for a third season. Marvel Studios Animation took over production of the series starting with season 2. Disney Jr. further renewed the series for a fourth season on June 13, 2023, a fifth season on February 27, 2025, a sixth season five months later on June 7, and a seventh season during the Celebrate 65 Years of Marvel's Spider-Man! panel at D23: The Ultimate Disney Fan Event in Anaheim, California on August 15, 2026.

With its preemptive sixth and seventh season renewals, Spidey and His Amazing Friends is slated to jointly become Disney Jr. and Marvel's longest running animated series by episode count, surpassing Doc McStuffins (136 episodes) and Disney XD's Avengers Assemble (127 episodes) with five seasons each. It is also the second Marvel television series overall to be renewed for seven seasons after ABC's Agents of S.H.I.E.L.D., as well as the second series within any of Disney's core branded networks (and the first for both its animated catalog and Disney Jr.) to reach this milestone after Disney Channel's Bunk'd.

=== Music ===
Patrick Stump of the pop punk rock band Fall Out Boy wrote, composed, and performed the theme song for the series. A longtime Marvel fan, he used themes from previous Spider-Man media as inspiration.

The first 68 episodes also used an instrumental for the opening theme, but for episode 69 onwards, the ending theme is "Do the Spidey", which was written by Stump and series story writer Harrison Willcox, and performed by Stump.

== Release ==
Spidey and His Amazing Friends premiered with a series of 11 short episodes titled Meet Spidey and His Amazing Friends on June 21, 2021, on Disney Channel and Disney Jr., followed by Disney+ on July 16. The series also premiered on September 11, 2021, in Southeast Asia, but only lasted 20 days before the channel's closure on October 1, 2021.

The full series premiered on August 6 with a simulcast on Disney Jr. and Disney Channel, later on Disney+ on September 22.

The second season of Meet Spidey and His Amazing Friends premiered on July 18, 2022, on Disney Channel and Disney Jr., followed by Disney+ on August 17.

The second season of the series premiered on August 19, 2022, with a simulcast on Disney Jr. and Disney Channel, followed by Disney+ later on.

On October 10, 2022, the series debuted on CBeebies in the United Kingdom, making this the first show based on a Disney property to premiere on said network.

The third season of the series premiered on January 8, 2024, on Disney Channel and Disney Jr., followed by Disney+ later on. A crossover episode with Moon Girl and Devil Dinosaur, "Moon Girl and the Dino Dilemma", aired on November 15, 2024.

The fourth season of the series premiered on June 16, 2025 on Disney Jr., followed by Disney+ on June 17.

The fifth season of the series premiered on July 13, 2026 on Disney Jr., followed by Disney+ on July 14.

=== Spin-offs ===
A spin-off series, Iron Man and His Awesome Friends, premiered on Disney Jr. on August 11, 2025, and its first ten episodes premiered on Disney+ the next day.

Iron Man and His Awesome Friends is set to end after 40 episodes over a single season to make way for the second upcoming spin-off, Avengers: Mightiest Friends, which was announced in August 2025 and is slated to premiere in 2027.

=== Marketing ===
A story based on the series was released on May 3, 2025, alongside an Iron Man and His Awesome Friends story as part of a Free Comic Book Day comic.

== Reception ==
=== Critical response ===
Adam Levine of Looper ranked Spidey and His Amazing Friends 19th in their "Every 2021 Superhero Movie And TV Show Ranked" list, asserting, "Bright, colorful, and wonderfully animated, it doesn't get high marks from comic book diehards, but has been nonetheless well-reviewed by parents of its young target audience for its wholesome stories and message of teamwork." Polly Conway of Common Sense Media rated the series three out of five stars, writing, "The whole "Marvel Babies" concept may be a little odd for parents, and more cynical viewers might see the show as a way to get even younger kids interested in the vast, lucrative Marvel franchise. But overall the show is charming, well-paced, and a solid choice for younger siblings who aren't ready for the movies or more mature cartoons."

Marisa Lascala of Good Housekeeping included Spidey and His Amazing Friends in their "60 Best Kids' TV Shows and Family Series of All Time" list. Dakota Mayes of MovieWeb ranked Spidey and His Amazing Friends 5th in their "Best Animated Spider-Man Series" list, stating, "Spider-Man and His Amazing Friends is different from all others on this list in that it is geared towards toddlers. This modern update of the classic 80's cartoon left out Iceman and Firestar, and traded them with other popular web-slingers like Ghost-Spider/Gwen Stacy and Miles Morales, nicknamed 'Spin' to avoid confusion with Peter Parker's alter ego. This trio appeared in two computer-animated shorts per episode that were filled with youthful fun and adventures. Each adorably animated episode featured a classic Spider-Man villain committing some mild manner of mischief. More than that, the series even included an occasional appearance from Marvel superheroes like Black Panther and Captain Marvel to add to the age-appropriate fun. This show was such a hit with its targeted age group that it earned itself a second season", which aired in 2022.

=== Ratings ===
Nielsen Media Research, which records viewership on certain American television screens, reported that Marvel's Spidey and His Amazing Friends ranked as the second most-watched streaming series among children aged 2–5 during the fourth quarter of 2024. The series also placed No. 2 among boys in the same age group, surpassing other major preschool series like Paw Patrol and Cocomelon. It has garnered over 2 billion views across Disney Jr. and Marvel HQ's YouTube channels, and has accumulated over 1 billion hours watched across linear TV and streaming on Disney+ in the United States. In December 2025, Disney announced that Marvel's Spidey and His Amazing Friends was among the television series to surpass one billion hours streamed on Disney+ in 2025. The series generated 73.7 billion minutes of watch time during the period from January 1, 2023, to July 4, 2026, according to Nielsen. Marvel's Spidey and His Amazing Friends accumulated 20.7 billion minutes of viewing across linear television and streaming platforms between September 22, 2025, and September 20, 2026, ranking as the tenth most-watched animated series during that period.

=== Accolades ===
The series was nominated for Best Editing in an Animated Pre-School Series at the 2023 Canadian Cinema Editors Awards. It was also nominated for Outstanding Animated Series at the 55th NAACP Image Awards.

== Tie-in media ==
=== Adaptations ===
==== English version by Marvel ====
- Spidey and his Amazing Friends (UPC 75960620428100111, 2022-04-04/2022-05-04): Free comic with stories from My First Comic Reader. Free Comic Book Day issue includes 2-page preview.

==== English version by Disney Books ====
- Spidey and His Amazing Friends: Panther Patience (ISBN 978-1-368-06988-5, 2021-08-03)
- Spidey and His Amazing Friends: Meet Team Spidey (ISBN 978-1-368-06990-8, 2021-08-03)
- World of Reading: Spidey and His Amazing Friends: Super Hero Hiccups (ISBN 978-1-368-06992-2, 2021-08-03)
- Spidey and His Amazing Friends: A Very Spidey Christmas (ISBN 978-1-368-07404-9, 2021-09-07)
- Spidey and His Amazing Friends: Spidey Saves the Day (ISBN 978-1-368-07605-0, 2021-12-28): Includes World of Reading: Spidey and His Amazing Friends: Super Hero Hiccups, 5-Minute Spider-Man Stories, 5-Minute Marvel Stories, World of Reading: This is Miles Morales, World of Reading: Five Super Hero Stories!, Snow Day for Groot!, Marvel Storybook Collection.
- Spidey and His Amazing Friends: Team Spidey Does It All! (ISBN 978-1-368-07607-4, 2022-02-01)
- Spidey and His Amazing Friends: Trick or TRACE-E (ISBN 978-1-368-07890-0, 2022-07-05)
- Spidey and His Amazing Friends: Construction Destruction (ISBN 978-1-368-07877-1, 2022-08-30)
- World of Reading: Spidey and His Amazing Friends: Housesitting at Tony's (ISBN 978-1-368-07880-1, 2022-09-13)
- Spidey and His Amazing Friends: Let's Swing, Spidey Team! (ISBN 978-1-368-08480-2, 2023-01-03)

=== Live shows ===
- In 2023, the characters of Spidey and His Amazing Friends appeared in the touring live action arena show Disney Junior Live On Tour: Costume Palooza.
- In August 2025, Spidey and His Amazing Friends was featured at Disney Jr. Let’s Play!, a three-day event celebrating Disney Junior programming at Disney California Adventure Park and the Downtown Disney District. The series was included in themed photo opportunities throughout the event, including a dedicated wall in Hollywood Land showcasing Spidey and His Amazing Friends alongside other Disney Junior titles such as Iron Man and His Awesome Friends. The event also featured live stage shows, character meet-and-greets, interactive games, and themed merchandise aimed at preschool audiences and their families.

=== TV specials ===
- On August 8, 2025, it was announced that characters from Spidey and His Amazing Friends would appear alongside characters from Iron Man and His Awesome Friends (which premiered three days later on August 11) in two 22-minute crossover specials, both serving as backdoor pilots for the upcoming Avengers: Mightiest Friends (which was announced that same day).
  - The first crossover special titled Spidey and Iron Man: Avengers Team-Up! premiered on October 16, 2025.
  - The second crossover special titled Spidey and the Avengers: Halloween Team-Up! premiered on September 24, 2026.
