= Marvel Press =

Prose novel imprint for Marvel Comics

- Parent company: Disney Publishing Worldwide
- Status: active
- Founded: 1982
- Headquarters location: New York, NY
- Key people: John Nee (publisher); Ruwan Jayatillek; (SVP)
- Publication types: novels, children's books
- Fiction genres: Superhero
- Official website: books.disney.com/book-author/marvel-press/

Marvel Press is the prose novel imprint for Marvel Comics jointly published with Disney Books.

== Background ==
Marvel first licensed two prose novels to Bantam Books, which published The Avengers Battle the Earth Wrecker by Otto Binder (1967) and Captain America: The Great Gold Steal by Ted White (1968). Pocket Books pick up the license in 1978, publishing nine books.

== History ==
=== Marvel Books ===
Marvel Books division was set up in 1982 to initially published coloring books and sticker sets, and was intended to also publish prose novels. Harry Flynn was hired as vice president of Marvel Books. In 1986, Marvel reached an agreement with Fisher-Price to launch a Fisher-Price line with 15 books in 1986 and 32 books in 1987.

Beginning in 1994, Berkley Boulevard and the since-defunct Byron Preiss Multimedia Company joined to publish Marvel prose novels until Preiss' legal troubles caused a temporary halt to the line in June 1999. Berkley completed the line in 2000 with a total of 45 novels and seven anthologies. The Preiss Company also teamed with Pocket Books from 1996 to 1997 for a young adult books line, including two choose-your-own-adventure books. In 2000 Preiss' BP Books/iBooks launched a new book line, distributed by Simon & Schuster, that ended in 2002.

=== Marvel Press ===
In 2003, following publication of the prose young adult novel Mary Jane, starring Mary Jane Watson from the Spider-Man mythos, Marvel Entertainment announced the formation of the publishing imprint Marvel Press, saying in a press release it planned to launch with three prose novels, aimed at various ages, in 2004, and publish at least 12 in 2005. With few books issued under the imprint, Marvel and Disney Books Group relaunched the Marvel Press imprint in 2011 with the Marvel Origin Storybooks line.

Near the end of 2012, Marvel launched a line of prose novels based on adapting popular storylines in a loosely shared universe. Hyperion Books announced in February 2013 a partnership with Marvel to publish in June two prose novels, She-Hulk Diaries and Rogue Touch. In March 2013, Marvel and GraphicAudio will release a 6 hours audio version of the "Civil War" prose novel with sound effects, cinematic music and narration.

Marvel Entertainment announced a new pre-school franchise, Marvel Super Hero Adventures, in September 2017 consisting of a short-form animated series along with publishing and merchandise during "Marvel Mania" October. In the publishing field, Marvel Press issued chapter books beginning in September. The first early reader chapter books was Deck the Malls! teamed Spider-Man with Spider-Gwen written by MacKenzie Cadenhead and Sean Ryan and art by Derek Laufman. Three additional chapter books were planned continuing into 2018. John Nee was appointed in January 2018 as publisher of Marvel Comics and Marvel Press.

In addition to its Marvel Press division efforts, Marvel Entertainment in 2019 agreed to two prose publishing licensing agreements. In September 2019, Scholastic signed a young reader agreement with the first two books to be published in 2020. The following month, Asmodee games company agreed to a multi-year novel publishing deal for its new fiction imprint, Aconyte, to debut in the fall 2020 in three formats: trade paperback, ebook and audio and distributed by Simon & Schuster in North America.

== See also ==
- List of novels based on Marvel Comics
- Marvel Fireside Books
