= Heroes United =

Series of direct to video films from Marvel Animation

Heroes United is a series of American direct-to-video animated superhero films from Marvel Animation. They are the first full-length direct-to-video CG animated features created by the animation studio. Both films are available to stream on Disney+.

== Iron Man and Hulk ==

Iron Man and Hulk: Heroes United is a direct-to-video animated film by Marvel Animation. The film is the first long form of animation for Marvel since its Marvel Universe TV block and targets children. The video was released on December 3, 2013.

=== Characters ===
- Tony Stark / Iron Man (voiced by Adrian Pasdar)
- Bruce Banner / Hulk (voiced by Fred Tatasciore)
- Zzzax (voiced by Dee Bradley Baker)
- Emil Blonsky / Abomination (voiced by Robin Atkin Downes)

=== Production ===
The studio used a new process that they invented referred to as a "2-D wrap." This process starts with traditional animation, then scanning into the computer to wrap it around the characters to give texture and weight to backgrounds and strongly emphasize facial expressions.

In October 2012, Marvel Animation Studios announced its first DTV production, the direct-to-video film Iron Man & Hulk: Heroes United, which was scheduled to be released on April 23, 2013. The release was pushed back to December 2013. The film was released on DVD, Blu-ray, Digital, and Disney Movies Anywhere on December 3, 2013.

=== Premise ===
Two Hydra scientists enlist the Abomination to help them capture the Hulk and siphon his gamma energy into their own version of Tony Stark's arc reactor. By the time Iron Man arrives to investigate, he and the Hulk find themselves facing the newly created energy creature Zzzax. They also fight a Wendigo and a fleet of Mandroids.

== Iron Man and Captain America ==
Iron Man and Captain America: Heroes United is a direct-to-streaming animated film by Marvel Animation. It is the second film in the Heroes United franchise.

=== Characters ===
- Tony Stark / Iron Man (voiced by Adrian Pasdar)
- Steve Rogers / Captain America (voiced by Roger Craig Smith)
- Bruce Banner / Hulk (voiced by Fred Tatasciore)
- Red Skull (voiced by Liam O'Brien)
- Anthony Masters / Taskmaster (voiced by Clancy Brown)

=== Production ===
The film was in production as of December 2013. A clip of the film was released along with an announcement that the film would be released in 2014. It was released on Digital HD, On-Demand, and Disney Movies Anywhere on July 29, 2014.

=== Plot ===
The Red Skull and Taskmaster strategize a plan to be rid of Captain America, by stealing weapons that belong to Iron Man. After the two heroes' training is complete, the Hydra soldiers infiltrate the Helicarrier and head towards the weapons vault. During their attack, two of the soldiers go in and escape with the Stark Repulsor Cannon. Iron Man flies to reclaim his repulsor cannon while Cap fights with Taskmaster, but to no avail as Taskmaster takes him down and kidnaps him, and brings him to the base.

The Red Skull steals Cap's superhuman blood to create an army, replicated with the same powers as he has, with a machine called the Neurotransducer. Iron Man learns that not only the hull of the Helicarrier is damaged, but his Mark VI armor was taken by Taskmaster during the infiltration. He finds their base in an abandoned military bunker in the Southern Estonia.

The serum is fully created, and the Red Skull brainwashes Cap, causing him turn into a pawn called Captain Hydra and fights against Iron Man who arrives to rescue him. During the fight, Cap hacks into Iron Man's systems, allowing Taskmaster to gain access to control the Mark VI armor. Iron Man gets Cap back to normal and put up a fake fight to make Taskmaster thinks Cap is still in Hydra's control. After that, Taskmaster announces his plan to Cap about overthrowing Red Skull to rule the world, before being beaten down by the two. As they leave, Taskmaster escapes and activates his Mark VI armor, naming himself the "Iron Master."

Arriving in Antarctica, the two Avengers witness a giant rocket, containing Cap's blood, enough to turn the entire population of the United States into the Red Skull's super-powered army, and an underground facility where they mass-produce the Stark Repulsor Cannon and copy Cap's shield from the real one. They fight off against the remaining Hydra soldiers and shut down production of the facility. Before they can take down the Red Skull, the Iron Master arrives and attempts to kill him, but the Iron Master's armor is in the Red Skull's control and forces him to kill them but is quickly beaten. The superhuman Hydra soldiers arrive to defeat the two avengers. Before they can finish them off, the Hulk arrives to their aid. Iron Man fights against the Iron Master with the Hulk and wins, while Cap goes to confront the Red Skull and to halt the rocket's launch sequence. Cap succeeds in stopping the rocket by sticking his shield into the fuel tanks, causing the rocket to destruct by the launch, and destroying the whole facility in the process. The Red Skull, the Iron Master and the remaining Hydra soldiers get taken into custody by S.H.I.E.L.D.

At the Helicarrier, Iron Man, Cap (as Iron Patriot) and the Hulk begin training and end up with the two being beaten by Iron Patriot's heat-seeking missiles. After the two make up, they and the Hulk go out to eat some pie.

== Reception ==
=== Critical response ===
==== Iron Man and Hulk: Heroes United ====
John-Michael Bond of The Daily Dot wrote, "Marvel excels at telling patently ridiculous stories in a way that draws you in, and this animated tale of mad scientists run amok is a shining example. Reimagining the origin story of the Hulk villain Zzzax, a being of pure energy and onomatopoeia, this adventure focuses on the humorous partnership that arises when Iron Man and the god of smashing team up. Computer effects make the animation occasionally look a little odd, but it's highly stylized art—and what comic fan could turn their nose up at that?." Troy Blackburn of Screen Rant ranked Iron Man and Hulk: Heroes United 16th in their "16 Best Marvel Animated Movies" list. Brent McCluskey of Mic ranked Iron Man and Hulk: Heroes United 45th in their "50 Netflix Superhero Movies and TV Shows to Binge Watch in 2017" list, calling it one of the "50 best superhero movies and TV shows on Netflix in 2017."

==== Iron Man and Captain America: Heroes United ====
John-Michael Bond of The Daily Dot wrote, "Marvel's Heroes United movies are lighthearted fare, designed to show off the joys of a superhero team-up while telling a big action story full of laughs. Centering on the dueling hubris of the Avengers two leaders, Iron Man & Captain America: Heroes United follows our heroes as they takedown Red Skull and an army of Hydra super soldiers. The computerized animation takes some getting used to, but Clancy Brown is a joy as the villainous Taskmaster. If you're looking for a good film for your kids, Iron Man & Captain America: Heroes United fits the bill." Joe Garza of /Film said, "Iron Man and Captain America: Heroes United is carried by the wonderful chemistry between the two heroes as they continually compete to show up each other, which only makes the moments of them fighting together as a team all the more satisfying."

Brian Costello of Common Sense Media gave Iron Man and Captain America: Heroes United a grade of three out of five stars, calling it a "noir" take on Captain America and Iron Man. Troy Blackburn of Screen Rant ranked Captain America:Heroes United 14th in their "16 Best Marvel Animated Movies" list. Brent McCluskey of Mic ranked Iron Man and Captain America: Heroes United 47th in their "50 Netflix Superhero Movies and TV Shows to Binge Watch in 2017" list, calling it one of the "50 best superhero movies and TV shows on Netflix in 2017."

=== Sales ===
Year	Adult swim	Number	Gross (US$ sales)	Units (US sales)	Ref.
2013	Iron Man and Hulk: Heroes United	1	$717,031		
2014	Iron Man and Captain America: Heroes United	2			

== In other media ==
=== Merchandise ===
- In 2013, Diamond Select Toys released a Tony Stark / Iron Man minimate and a Bruce Banner / Hulk minimate inspired by the Heroes United incarnations of the characters.
