= Iron Man and His Awesome Friends =

2025 American Disney Jr. superhero series

- Also known as: Iron Man and His Awesome Friends: Giant-Sized Armor (episode 20–present)
- Genre: Preschool; Superhero
- Based on: Iron Man by: Stan Lee; Larry Lieber; Don Heck; Jack Kirby
- Showrunner: Sean Coyle
- Directed by: Michael Dowding
- Voices of: Mason Blomberg; Lincoln Bonilla; Kapri Ladd; Aidyn Ahn; Fred Tatasciore
- Opening theme: "Totally Awesome" (The Iron Man and His Awesome Friends Theme Song), written by Mark Hoppus, Peter Martin and John DeBold and performed by Mark Hoppus
- Ending theme: "Totally Awesome" (The Iron Man and His Awesome Friends Theme Song) (Instrumental)
- Composer: Matthew Margeson
- Countries of origin: United States; Canada
- Original language: English
- No. of seasons: 1
- No. of episodes: 36

Production
- Executive producers: Sean Coyle; Harrison Wilcox
- Production companies: Atomic Cartoons; Marvel Studios Animation

Original release
- Network: Disney Jr.
- Release: August 11, 2025 – present

Related
- Spidey and His Amazing Friends

Iron Man and His Awesome Friends, also known as Marvel's Iron Man and His Awesome Friends, is a preschool animated series directed by Michael Dowding, based on characters created by Marvel Comics. Produced by Marvel Studios Animation and Atomic Cartoons as a spin-off of Spidey and His Amazing Friends, it features the voices of Mason Blomberg, Lincoln Bonilla, Kapri Ladd, and Aidyn Ahn. Sean Coyle serves as showrunner. It is the first Iron Man television series since Iron Man: Armored Adventures (which also starred a younger version of the titular protagonist) from 2009 to 2012. The series premiered on August 11, 2025 on Disney Jr. and its first ten episodes premiered on Disney+ the next day.

On July 21, 2026, it was reported that the series will end after a single season of 40 episodes in favor of Avengers: Mightiest Friends, which is slated to premiere in 2027.

== Synopsis ==
Tony Stark / Iron Man, Riri Williams / Ironheart, and Amadeus Cho / Iron Hulk form the Iron Friends, using their intelligence and armored suits to solve problems and protect their city. Each suit enables flight and provides enhanced strength.

== Characters ==
=== Iron Friends ===
- Tony Stark / Iron Man (voiced by Mason Blomberg in episodes 1–19, Lincoln Bonilla in episodes 20–present) – The leader of the Iron Friends. He is the inventor of the group.
- Riri Williams / Ironheart (voiced by Kapri Ladd in the TV series, Mykal-Michelle Harris in the shorts) – A member of the Iron Friends. Her armor also has a Heartbeat Bubble ability.
- Amadeus Cho / Iron Hulk (voiced by Aidyn Ahn) – A member of the Iron Friends. His armor grants him super-strength.
  - Gamma / Iron Pup (vocal effects provided by Fred Tatasciore) – The pet mixed-breed dog of Amadeus Cho who also owns her own armor and sports a prosthetic front right leg.

=== Superhero allies ===
- Vision (voiced by David Kaye) – An android ally of the Iron Friends with laser vision and intangibility. He would often tend to IQ and inform the Iron Friends of an emergency. Vision also pilots the Iron Jet when dropping off the Iron Friends' giant-size armor. Kaye reprises his role from previous Marvel media adaptations, most notably Marvel's Avengers Assemble (2013–2019) and LEGO Marvel's Avengers: Mission Demolition (2024).
- Sam Wilson / Captain America (voiced by Hero Hunter) – A patriotic superhero.
  - Redwing – A robotic drone who serves as Captain America's sidekick.
- T'Challa / Black Panther (voiced by Cruz Flateau) – The ruler of Wakanda.
  - Uthuli – T'Challa's pet rhinoceros.
- Anya Corazon / Iron Spider (voiced by Lena Josephine Marano) – An armored spider-themed superhero.
- Clint Barton / Hawkeye (voiced by Nick A. Fisher) – An archer who utilizes trick arrows.
- Thor (voiced by Liam Karlsson) – The Norse god of thunder.
- Scott Lang / Giant-Man (voiced by Christopher Riley) – A size-shifting ally of Iron Man. His catchphrase is "gigantical".

=== Supporting ===
- Howard Stark (voiced by John Stamos) – The father of Tony Stark and CEO of Stark Industries. Howard is also shown to be the drummer of the musical group Dad Company as seen in "Swarm and Bugs Go to a Concert". Stamos previously voiced the adult Iron Man in both Spidey and His Amazing Friends and LEGO Marvel's Avengers: Mission Demolition (2024).
- Granny Williams (voiced by Jackée Harry) – The grandmother of Riri Williams who owns a pie-based food truck.
- Helen Cho (voiced by Lauren Tom) – The mother of Amadeus Cho.
- Odin (voiced by Alan Ruck) – The ruler of Asgard and the father of Thor and Loki.

=== Villains ===
- Ultron (voiced by Tony Hale) – An evil robot. He uses a flying Robotic Racer for transportation.
  - Nuts (voiced by Gary Anthony Williams) – The robotic minion of Ultron.
  - Bolts (voiced by Mo Collins) – The robotic minion of Ultron.
- Absorbing Man (voiced by Talon Warburton) – A supervillain who can absorb the properties of anything. He also wears a device on his right arm containing a retractable wrecking ball that can also turn into a claw. Absorbing Man uses a wrecking ball-type truck called the Rolling Wrecker for transportation.
- Swarm (voiced by Vanessa Bayer) – A female supervillain in insect-themed armor that sports retractable wings. She wields a Zzepter to control her robotic creations even when it comes to plotes to make different messes.
  - Robot Bugs – An assortment of robotic insects who work for Swarm.
  - Robot Crabs – A group of robotic crabs who accompanied Swarm in raiding IQ.
- Loki (voiced by Nylan Parthipan) – The Norse trickster god and Thor's brother.

=== Other characters ===
- Eggy Eggerson (voiced by Jess Harnell) – The owner of an egg-based food truck.
  - Omelette – Eddie's pet dog.
- Spark – The lightbulb mascot of Stark Expo.
- DJ Mikey Mike (voiced by Jess Harnell) – The DJ of One Hit Thunder Records.
- Doug (voiced by Carlos Alazraqui) – A dog trainer.
- Dottie Doubleday (voiced by Jessica Mendoza) – The owner of a batting cage.
  - Pedro the Pitcher (voiced by Talon Warburton) – Dottie's robot pitching machine.
- Dizzy Doubleday (voiced by Mookie Betts) – A baseball player and the brother of Dottie Doubleday.
- Spencer Q. Sweets (voiced by Stephen Tobolowsky) – The owner of a candy store at the Beachside Mall.
- Melanie Mailperson (voiced by Alanna Ubach) – A mail carrier who works at the local post office.
- Carla (voiced by Abril Bellido) – A kid who is a fan of the Iron Friends.
- Preston (voiced by Fred Tatasciore) – A park ranger. He is shown to love nature and granola bars.
  - PJ (voiced by Aiden Maloney) – Preston's son.
- Gary Guitar (voiced by Carlos Alazraqui) – A guitar player and member of Dad Company.
- Barry Bass (voiced by John Eric Bentley) – A bass guitar player and member of Dad Company.
- Sammy Scientist (voiced by Rama Vallury) – A scientist of the geology branch.
- Teoscar Toymaker (voiced by Gary Anthony Williams) – The proprietor of the toy store at the Beachside Mall.
- Love-N-Hugs Teddy Bear (voiced by Alanna Ubach) – Toy teddy bears for Valentine's Day.
- Pierre (voiced by Jeff Bennett) – A barker who works at the pier.
- Floopo (voiced by Eric Bauza) – An alien from the movie Flying Saucer Floopo who rides around in a UFO eating whatever food he can abduct. He gets out of the movie screen because of Loki.
- Lisa Lighthouse (voiced by Yvette Nicole Brown) – A lighthouse keeper.
- Lifeguard Lyle (voiced by John Eric Bentley) – A lifeguard who works at the water park Frosty Falls.
- Christin Cakehaus (voiced by Cree Summer) – A cupcake vendor.
- Herbie Hardhat (voiced by John Eric Bentley) – A construction foreman.
- Astronaut Amy (voiced by Emily Calandrelli) – An astronaut.

== Episodes ==
All episodes are directed by Michael Dowding.

No.	Title	Written by	Storyboarded by	Original release date	Prod. code	U.S. viewers (millions)
1	"Enter the Iron Friends"	James Eason-Garcia	Aynsley King	August 11, 2025	101	N/A
1	"Amadeus Cho's Eggcellent Eggventure!"	Sean Coyle	Aynsley King	August 11, 2025	101	N/A
Enter the Iron Friends: As Vision sets up a picnic area, Iron Man, Ironheart, Iron Hulk, and Iron Pup contend with Ultron who is stealing all the toys in the area. Amadeus Cho's Eggcellent Eggventure!: Amadeus Cho works on helping Eggy Eggerson with the upgrade to his egg-themed food truck. Unfortunately, it ends up turning the food truck into a giant robotic chicken.
2	"Great Expo-tations"	Joe Morgan	Kyle Manske	August 12, 2025	102	N/A
2	"Bouncy Boots"	Written by : Leanna Dindal; Story by : Neyah Barbee	Kyle Manske	August 12, 2025	102	N/A
Great Expo-tations: Howard Stark is hosting the Stark Expo as the Iron Friends take part in it. It soon gets crashed by Ultron who plans to make it his own expo with his giant stickers. Bouncy Boots: Amadeus Cho has invented some rubber boots that are very bouncy. After he loses control of them, Absorbing Man acquires the properties of those boots and starts bouncing everywhere.
3	"Totally Awesome Beach Day"	Leanna Dindal	Aynsley King	August 13, 2025 (Note: This episode was released on Disney+ on August 12, 2025.)	109	N/A
3	"Swarm Stinks it Up"	Written by : Marty Isenberg; Story by : Michael Olmo	Aynsley King	August 13, 2025	109	N/A
Totally Awesome Beach Day: Tony, Riri, and Amadeus are having a beach day. Unfortunately, it gets disrupted when Ultron plans to build his own headquarters on the beach. Swarm Stinks it Up: Riri learns that her grandmother's peach pies have been made for her food truck. She, Iron Man, and Captain America work to protect the peach pies from Swarm and her robotic stinkbugs.
4	"The Ultron Song"	Written by : Joe Morgan; Story by : Neyah Barbee	Kyle Maske	August 14, 2025	104	N/A
4	"Black Panther and the Bot"	Written by : Leanna Dindal; Story by : Michael Olmo	Kyle Maske	August 14, 2025	104	N/A
The Ultron Song: Ultron takes control of One Hit Thunder Records to have it constantly play "The Ultron Song" after driving out DJ Mikey Mike. The Iron Friends must work to defeat Ultron, shut down the song, and reclaim One Hit Thunder Records. Black Panther and the Bot: Black Panther visits IQ as Iron Man works on a training program to impress him. A malfunction happens causing the Iron Friends and Black Panther to work on surviving it and deactivating it so that it can be repaired.
5	"Captain America Goes Fast"	Neyah Barbee	Aynsley King	August 15, 2025	103	N/A
5	"Ironheart's Awesome Playground"	Michael Olmo	Aynsley King	August 15, 2025	103	N/A
Captain America Goes Fast: Captain America shows off his new power pack to the Iron Friends that makes him fly fast. Vision informs the Iron Friends about Ultron causing trouble. Ultron steals Captain America's power pack to enhance his Robotic Racer causing the Iron Friends and Captain America to find a way to stop Ultron and reclaim the power pack. Ironheart's Awesome Playground: Ironheart works on building a playground for the local children. Unfortunately, it gets crashed by Swarm and her robotic mosquitoes who drain the power from the Iron Friends' suit. Now the Iron Friends must find a way to recharge their suits so that they can defeat Swarm and her robotic mosquitoes and open the playground.
6	"Tony and the Rolling Stones"	Written by : Joe Morgan; Story by : Harrison Wilcox	Kyle Manske	August 22, 2025	106	N/A
6	"Ironheart's Muddy Adventure"	Written by : Asha Bynum; Story by : Neyah Barbee	Kyle Manske	August 22, 2025	106	N/A
Tony and the Rolling Stones: Iron Man comes across Ultron and his minions Nuts and Bolts causing trouble on a trail by throwing boulders everywhere. When it becomes too much for him, Iron Man must call Ironheart and Iron Hulk for backup. Ironheart's Muddy Adventure: Riri wants to show off her paper boats in the creek. Unfortunately, it gets disrupted when Swarm drains the creek. The Iron Friends must work to defeat Swarm and restore the creek.
7	"Welcome to Wakanda"	Neyah Barbee	Kyle Manske	September 5, 2025	110	N/A
7	"Puppy Dog Fun"	Marcial Rios Salcido	Kyle Manske	September 5, 2025	110	N/A
Welcome to Wakanda: The Iron Friends visit Black Panther in Wakanda. He shows them Wakanda's different technologies. Unfortunately, Ultron has followed the Iron Friends to Wakanda and plans to make use of the technologies starting with the Invisibili-Belt. The Iron Friends and Black Panther work to reclaim the Wakandan technologies and defeat Ultron. Puppy Dog Fun: The Iron Friends and Iron Pup partake in Doggy Adoption Day by helping Dog Trainer Doug in preparing the dogs to be adopted. Things get worse when Swarm uses her special collars to take control of all the dogs there in order to make the park messy. Soon, Iron Pup falls under Swarm's control which furthers her goals. The Iron Friends must work to free the dogs, free Iron Pup, and defeat Swarm.
8	"Ironheart's Baseball Blast"	Joe Morgan	Aynsley King	September 12, 2025	111	N/A
8	"Swarm the IQ"	Written by : Leanna Dindal; Story by : Marcial Rios Salcido	Aynsley King	September 12, 2025	111	N/A
Ironheart's Baseball Blast: The Iron Friends visit Dottie Doubleday's batting cages where Ironheart helps to repair the robot pitching machine Pedro the Pitcher. Seeing Pedro the Pitcher in action, Absorbing Man plans to steal Pedro and cause havoc with it. The Iron Friends must work to rescue Pedro and defeat Absorbing Man. Swarm the IQ: Amadeus has spotted some bioluminescent kelp nearby the IQ as he informs his mother Helen Cho. He plans to have a viewing party to see them when the sun goes down as Vision works on making the right food for the event. The plans get delayed when Swarm invades IQ with an army of robotic crabs.
9	"Iron Friends Trick or Treats!"	Written by : Michael Olmo; Story by : Marcial Rios Salcido	Aynsley King	September 29, 2025	105	N/A
9	"Leaping Into Fall"	Written by : Neyah Barbee; Story by : Jason Eason-Garcia	Aynsley King	September 29, 2025	105	N/A
Iron Friends Trick or Treats!: On Halloween, Tony, Riri, and Amadeus plan to go trick-or-treating which will end at Spencer Q. Sweets' candy shop. Amadeus sprains his foot after trying to finish his robot costume for trick-or-treating and is unable to go because he needs to rest under the advice of Vision. Tony and Riri finish the robot costume by having it put on remote control while Amadeus rests on the couch. When Amadeus' smoothie is accidentally spilled on the remote control, Iron Man and Ironheart must save Halloween after Amadeus' robot costume steals all the candy. Leaping Into Fall: During Fall, Tony, Riri, and Anya Corazon are setting up for the Pumpkin Party. However, the pumpkins aren't there because Iron Spider forgot to get them. Upon arrival at the pumpkin patch, Tony, Riri, and Anya work to get the pumpkins. Just then, Swarm arrives with her army of Squash Bugz who get their name because they are assisting her in a plot to smash the pumpkins so that she can make the messiest mess out them. Iron Man, Ironheart, and Iron Spider must stop Swarm and her army of Squash Bugz from destroying the pumpkins and make it back to the Pumpkin Party before everyone arrives.
10	"Special Delivery for the Iron Friends"	Neyah Barbee	Kyle Manske	October 10, 2025	108	N/A
10	"The Fix-It Bot Fiasco"	Joe Morgan	Kyle Manske	October 10, 2025	108	N/A
Special Delivery for the Iron Friends: The Iron Friends build Delivery Bots to help out Melanie Mailperson. Unfortunately, their remote gets swiped by Ultron, Nuts, and Bolts. One Delivery Bot was supposed to bring eggs to Eggy only for it to start swiping his other stuff. Soon, all the Delivery Bots start swiping everything in the city. The Iron Friends must work to defeat Ultron, Nuts, and Bolts, reclaim the remote control for Melanie Mailperson, and return the items that were stolen. The Fix-It Bot Fiasco: The Iron Friends visit Howard Stark at the Stark Expo and see an exhibit for all of his prototypes. One of them is a Fix-It Bot that Howard couldn't get to work right. While Howard goes to check up on the monorail, Tony leads Riri and Amadeus into fixing up the Fix-It Bot and getting it to work right. Unfortunately, it still doesn't work right and starts breaking everything. Now the Iron Friends must stop the Fix-It Bot from causing chaos at Stark Expo and work on subduing the Fix-It Bot.
11	"Baby Vision"	Written by : Marty Isenberg; Story by : Michael Olmo	Kyle Manske	November 3, 2025	112	N/A
11	"Ironheart's Racing Adventure"	Neyah Barbee	Kyle Manske	November 3, 2025	112	N/A
Baby Vision: Vision is known to be of good help around IQ with Tony, Riri, and Amadeus. Ultron, Nuts, and Bolts show up at IQ as Ultron plans to use the Babyfier to turn the Iron Friends into itty bitty babies. This fails when Vision pushes Tony out of the way and is turned into a baby where his lasers break the Babyfier. As the Iron Friends work to catch a baby Vision, Ultron, Nuts, and Bolts work to repair the Babyfier. Now the Iron Friends must work to get their hands on the Babyfier and return Vision to normal. Ironheart's Racing Adventure: The Iron Friends take their Iron Racers to a car show that is being hosted by DJ Mikey Mike and also attended by Melanie Mailperson and Carla. Before DJ Mikey Mike can announce the winner, Swarm shows up with her snail-like Slime Bugs to shoot slime at the cars. The Iron Friends can't seem to put a dent in the Slime Bugs because of their tough armor. In need of another tactic, the Iron Friends have DJ Mikey Mike lead all the cars away from the Slime Bugs resulting in an evasive drive all over the city and a last stand at a junkyard as the Iron Friends' Iron Racers come in handy.
12	"Iron Hulk and the Bees"	Asha Bynum	Aynsley King	November 4, 2025	113	N/A
12	"Fly Away Iron Friends"	Written by : Joe Morgan; Story by : Michael Olmo	Aynsley King	November 4, 2025	113	N/A
Iron Hulk and the Bees: Amadeus is raising a beehive that is inhabited by bees where one of them gained the name Beetrice. He plans to have natural honey from them. A setback occurs when Swarm attacks IQ with an army of goo-shooting Robo-Bees in order to steal the honey. The Iron Friends and the bees now must work to reclaim the honey without getting trapped in goo and defeat Swarm and her Robo-Bees. Fly Away Iron Friends: At the Stark Expo, Howard Stark unveils his new Float Ray for the outer space experients that will be opened tonight. The attendees end up getting an earlier experience when Ultron, Nuts, and Bolts steal the float ray and use it on everyone and everything in Ultron's second attempt to turn Stark Expo into Ultron Expo. The Iron Friends must work to rescue everyone and everything from floating and reclaim the float ray from Ultron.
13	"The Iron Friends Go Camping"	Written by : Leanna Dindal; Story by : Leanna Dindal & Marcial Rios Salcido	Kyle Manske	November 5, 2025	114	N/A
13	"Swarm and Bugs Go to a Concert"	Written by : Marty Isenberg; Story by : Michael Olmo	Kyle Manske	November 5, 2025	114	N/A
The Iron Friends Go Camping: Tony, Riri, Amadeus, Gamma, and Vision go on a camping trip. Upon arrival, they meet up with a park ranger named Preston. Amadeus plans to make his special s'moree. All camping activities have a set back when all the food that the campers have brought are stolen. Tony suspects that Bigfoot is responsible. While Iron Pup and Vision guard the camp, the Iron Friends go after the trail of the culprit and find that it's not Bigfoot. It's actually Absorbing Man who wanted the food for himself. The Iron Friends must work to defeat Absorbing Man when he acquires the property of a rock and reclaim the camp food. Swarm and Bugs Go to a Concert: At the Stark Expo, Tony has prepared a special lightshow for Howard's musical group Dad Company which also consists of Gary Guitar and Barry Bass. As the sound check is done, the rehearsals are disrupted when Swarm arrives with an army of Robo-Crickets whose deafening sounds start to affect the Stark Expo. The Iron Friends spring into action to fight the Robo-Crickets who cause havoc. When they get close to the microphone, their sounds get worse. The Iron Friends must find a way to overcome the Robo-Cricket's sounds and defeat Swarm.
14	"Redwing's First Flight"	Neyah Barbee	Aynsley King	November 6, 2025	115	N/A
14	"Absorbing Man Gets Shiny"	Written by : Danielle Kreger; Story by : Michael Olmo	Aynsley King	November 6, 2025	115	N/A
Redwing's First Flight: Tony and Sam have invented a drone called Redwing to be Captain America's sidekick. Vision comes in and informs them that Ultron is causing trouble at the Beachside Mall. Upon their arrival, Iron Man and Captain America find Ultron stealing everyone's purchased items and has equipped laser-shooting jetpacks to Nuts and Bolts. Amidst the battle, Redwing is unfamiliar with the battle plans which leads to it, Iron Man, and Captain America to get caught. Iron Man and Captain America must work to get Redwing familiar with battle plans so that they can retrieve the stolen items and defeat Ultron, Nuts, and Bolts. Absorbing Man Gets Shiny: Iron Man, Ironheart, and Iron Hulk meet up with Sammy Scientist who has found a strong gemstone in the hills. The Iron Friends managed to get it out. Unfortunately, Absorbing Man has followed the Iron Friends and steals the gemstone to serve as his wrecking ball. He starts to use the gemstone to cause havoc in the city as the Iron Friends work to keep everyone safe. Absorbing Man then absorbs the properties of the gemstone to fight the Iron Friends. Due to their attacks not phasing Absorbing Man, the Iron Friends must come up with a tactic to retrieve the gemstone and defeat Absorbing Man.
15	"An Iron Friends Christmas"	Leanna Dindal	Aynsley King	November 7, 2025	107	N/A
15	"Cold as Ice"	Written by : Michael Olmo; Story by : Marcial Rios Salcido	Aynsley King	November 7, 2025	107	N/A
An Iron Friends Christmas: During the Christmas season, Tony, Riri, and Amadeus are setting up IQ and preparing for the arrival of Howard Stark, Granny Williams, and Helen Cho. Tony even invented a device to help make use of giftwrapping called the Gift Wrapper Machine and Vision works on making a gingerbread house. The preparations are disrupted when Nuts and Bolts sneak into IQ so that they can help Ultron steal all the presents as the Gift Wrapper Machine ends up stolen as well. The Iron Friends must work to stop Ultron, Nuts, and Bolts from ruining Christmas and return everyone's decorations. Cold as Ice: At the Stark Expo, the Winter Festival is occurring. The main attraction is a snow-maker machine that turns ice blocks into snow. Tony and Anya are in attendance. They prevent Absorbing Man from taking more than one food. Displeased with this outcome, Absorbing Man plans to ruin the Winter Festival. He does this by absorbing the properties of an ice block and starts freezing everything. In addition, he breaks the fountain and freezes the spilled water. After evacuating everyone out of Stark Expo, Iron Man and Iron Spider must maneuver across the ice so that they can defeat Absorbing Man, unthaw everything, and save the Winter Festival.
16	"The Tale of Hawkeye"	Written by : Joe Morgan; Story by : Asha Bynum & James Eason-Garcia	Kyle Manske	November 7, 2025	116	N/A
16	"Iron Sleepover"	Written by : John N. Huss; Story by : Neyah Barbee	Kyle Manske	November 7, 2025	116	N/A
The Tale of Hawkeye: The Iron Friends are practicing on the obstacle course. They stop when Vision informs them of trouble at the Beachside Mall. They arrive where they find arrows on the toy store and learn from Teoscar Toymaker that someone robbed his story. The Iron Friends then chase after Hawkeye who is on the trail of the thief and prefers to work alone. They discover that Absorbing Man is the culprit behind the Beachside Mall heist. The Iron Friends must get Hawkeye to work together with them to catch Absorbing Man and recover the stolen stuff. Iron Sleepover: The Iron Friends are having their first sleepover party at IQ. Also in attendance is Anya Corazon. While Vision and Gamma go to get the pizzas, Tony plans some sleepover games for the party. When it comes to hide and seek, Tony's plans to find everyone get derailed when security footage shows that Ultron is on the property. Ultron has a plan to steal IQ's arc reactor so that he can become powerful. Iron Man plans to stop him and return to the sleepover. This does not go the way he hoped. When Ultron makes off with the arc reactor, the Iron Friends and Iron Spider must reclaim it, defeat Ultron, and return to the sleepover party.
17	"Ultron Ruins Valentine's Day"	Written by : Melinda LaRose; Story by : Joe Morgan	Aynsley King	January 30, 2026 (Note: This episode was released on Disney+ on November 18, 2025.)	117	N/A
17	"The Iron Friends and the Trouble at the Tar Pits"	Leanna Dindal	Aynsley King	January 30, 2026	117	N/A
Ultron Ruins Valentine's Day: Today is Valentine's Day and the Love-N-Hugs Teddy Bears are on sale at the Beach Side Mall. Riri plans to get one for her grandmother. Just then, Ultron attacks the Beachside Mall and steals all the Love-N-Hugs Teddy Bears. When the Iron Friends catch up to Ultron, they find that he had placed Ultron-like "ears" on them to obey his every command which makes it difficult for the Iron Friends to harm them. The Iron Friends must work to free the Love-N-Nugs Teddy Bears from Ultron's control and defeat Ultron before he ruins Valentine's Day for everyone. The Iron Friends and the Trouble at the Tar Pits: The Iron Friends have helped Sammy Scientist set up a Tar Pit Museum so that people can learn about the tar pits. Also on display is a woolly mammoth skeleton that was dredged from one of the tar pits. Meanwhile, Swarm plans to make a mess of the Tar Pit Museum. She takes advantage of the fact that Absorbing Man doesn't like waiting in lines and suggests they make a mess together. As Absorbing Man throws tar, Swarm attacks with her slippery pillbug-type Robo Tar Bugs. The Iron Friends work to avoid gettin stuck in tar as Absorbing Man gets annoyed that Swarm is doing more harm that he is which the Iron Friends plan to take advantage of.
18	"Absorbing Man's Magnetic Mayhem"	Marty Isenberg	Kyle Manske	February 6, 2026	118	N/A
18	"The Iron Friends and the Baby Birds"	Written by : Rick Suvalle; Story by : Joe Morgan	Kyle Manske	February 6, 2026	118	N/A
Absorbing Man's Magnetic Mayhem: At the Stark Expo, Tony shows off his magnetic invention to Howard with help from Riri and Amadeus when finding metal stuff that people would misplace like keys. Though it does have some bugs in it. Absorbing Man sneaks into the Stark Expo. Seeing the magnetic device, Absorbing Man absorbs its properties and develops magnetic abilities enabling him to steal small metals stuff. He soon loses control when it starts attracting larger stuff. The Iron Friends must find a way to stop and help Absorbing Man without their armors getting trapped. The Iron Friends and the Baby Birds: Iron Man, Iron Hulk, and Captain America are flying towards a tall building where a bird is raising its three chicks. Iron Man places a webcam near the nest so that people can watch the birds in action. Afterwards, Iron Man, Iron Hulk, and Captain America notice that Swarm and her ladybug-themed Paint Bugs are causing paint-based havoc around the city. Their attempts to stop the Paint Bugs end up making things worse for the city. With the nest of birds in danger, Iron Man, Iron Hulk, and Captain America must teach the chicks how to fly and then defeat Swarm.
19	"The Iron Friends vs. The Iron Fiends"	Written by : Neyah Barbee; Story by : James Eason-Garcia	Aynsley King	March 6, 2026	119	N/A
19	"Vision's Invisible Trouble"	Asha Bynum	Aynsley King	March 6, 2026	119	N/A
The Iron Friends vs. The Iron Fiends: Without using their armors, Tony, Riri, and Amadeus managed to get a cat down from the tree on IQ's property. Vision informs them about trouble at the Beachside Mall. Upon their arrival, they find that imposters have been posing as them and causing havoc. The Iron Friends learn that the imposters are actually Ultron, Swarm, and Absorbing Man in disguise where they use the Ultron Suits to become the Iron Fiends. Using a nano-trap, the Iron Fiends trap the Iron Friends and head off to take control of Stark Expo. After not using their armors to get out, the Iron Friends must work to defeat the Iron Fiends and expose them for all the trouble they caused. Vision's Invisible Trouble: Vision takes Tony, Riri, and Amadeus to the local museum where his artwork is on display. It ends up getting ruined when Ultron shows up and uses his Inviso-Ray to make everything invisible so that everyone would look at him instead. After making everything invisible at the mall, Ultron proceeds to make the entire city invisible as Iron Man, Ironheart, Iron Hulk, and Vision work to rescue everyone. Soon, Ultron turns the tentacles of his robotic racer invisible as he captures the Iron Friends and makes them watch him turn IQ invisible.
20	"Enter the Giant-Sized Iron Friends"	Leanna Dindal	Kyle Manske	June 11, 2026	TBA	N/A
20	"The Mighty Thor and Mischievous Loki"	Joe Morgan	Kyle Manske	June 11, 2026	TBA	N/A
Enter the Giant-Sized Iron Friends: At the pier, Tony, Riri, and Amadeus were about to spend some time there when Ultron shows up wanting to claim the pier for himself. The Iron Friends armor up to fight Ultron while having to save lives. In the nick of time, Scott shows up and transforms into Giant-Man to help the Iron Friends save the pier. Iron Man gets the idea to make giant-size armors so that they can be big like Giant-Man. Overhearing the discussion, Ultron gets an idea to make his own giant-size armor. The Iron Friends' giant-size armor is put to the rest with Giant-Man's help when Ultron attacks the city with his own giant armor and makes plans to take over Stark Expo again. The Mighty Thor and Mischievous Loki: Riri fixes up the Iron Mech Suits as Thor comes to pay a visit. He shows off the many traits of his hammer to Tony, Riri, Amadeus, and Gamma. While playing baseball, Thor hits the baseball far as Gamma becomes Iron Pup to retrieve it. Their fun is disrupted when Thor's brother Loki shows up. He starts by making everything in IQ float as Loki dares Thor and the Iron Friends to catch up to him as they follow him around to the Smashcade, the greenhouse, and the garage. The only way to stop Loki is to take away his staff as Thor and the Iron Friends work to take Loki's staff.
21	"The Caves of Wakanda"	Neyah Barbee	Aynsley King	June 11, 2026	TBA	N/A
21	"Swarm's Lightning Bug Blast"	Written by : Marty Isenberg; Story by : Asha Bynum	Aynsley King	June 11, 2026	TBA	N/A
The Caves of Wakanda: In Wakanda, T'Challa shows Tony and Riri his new Panther Plane where he needs their help getting it finished so that it can do many things. Once Riri touches up on it, T'Challa takes her and Tony to the Wakandan Vibranium Caves. Ultron arrives with plans to steal some Vibranium. Taking the elevator to the Vibranium Caves, T'Challa gives Tony and Riri a tour where they see the Wakanda Cave Bots mine the Vibranium and place them in the Cave Cruiders. As they claim some Vibranium, Ultron ambushes them and steals Vibranium to power his Robotic Racer. Swarm's Lightning Bug Blast: At Stark Expo, Tony, Riri, and Amadeus show off the Sky Scooters where everyone is in helmets. The Sky Scooters can scoot through the sky and not on the streets as everyone tries them including one Sky Scooter that is large enough for Spark. Just then, Swarm shows up with her robotic Lightning Bugs where they are unleashed to zap the Sky Scooters causing the riders to lose control of them. Transforming into Iron Man, Ironheart, and Iron Hulk, the Iron Friends deal with the Lightning Bugs while rescuing everyone from the out of control Sky Scooters.
22	"Gamma's Birthday"	Marcial Rios Salcido	Kyle Manske	June 11, 2026	TBA	N/A
22	"Ultron vs. Absorbing Man"	Written by : Joe Morgan; Story by : Marcial Rios Salcido	Kyle Manske	June 11, 2026	TBA	N/A
Gamma's Birthday: Today is Gamma's birthday as Iron Man, Ironheart, Iron Hulk, and Iron Spider help set up for it at the playground. When Gamma arrives, Tony, Riri, Amadeus, and Anya surprise her while wishing her a happy birthday as they kill time before the other guests arrive. Just then, a giant-sized pinata arrive much different from the one that Anya ordered from Melanie Mailperson. This is becaused it is a metallic vehicle controlled by Ultron in his plot to steal all the party stuff. Transforming into Iron Man, Ironheart, Iron Hulk, Iron Pup, and Iron Spider, they fight Ultron in order to rescue their party stuff and even the other party stuff in the park so that Gamma's birthday can be saved even when the Iron Friends have Vision bring their giant-size armor. Ultron vs. Absorbing Man: Iron Man and Ironheart arrive at the pier with their new Arc Reactor battery to make the pier more fun as they meet up with Pierre. Outside of the pier, Ultron tries to find a parking spot where one gets stolen from him by Absorbing Man. Ultron also hears that Absorbing Man is planning to steal the new Arc Reactor battery as Ultron had plans to steal the Arc Reactor battery to make his Robotic Racer go faster than ever. This causes Ultron and Absorbing Man to compete to see who will steal the Arc Reactor battery first. Iron Man and Ironheart must work to reclaim the Arc Reactor battery while also using their Iron Racers to help them defeat both Ultron and Absorbing Man.
23	"Hawkeye and the Super Smelly Stink Arrows"	Leanna Dindal	Aynsley King	June 11, 2026	TBA	N/A
23	"Loki's Movie Mania"	Marty Isenberg	Aynsley King	June 11, 2026	TBA	N/A
Hawkeye and the Super Smelly Stink Arrows: At the pier, Tony and Clint have set up an arrow game for Pierre as Tony is waiting for everyone to try it out. The demonstration is crashed by Ultron, who is wielding smelly stink arrows in a bid to claim the pier for himself. Loki's Movie Mania: Tony, Riri, and Amadeus prepare for movie night in the park which will be showing Riri's favorite movie Flying Saucer Floopo. However, Loki comes across movie night and makes it more fun by bringing Floopo to life.
24	"Game On"	Asha Bynum	Kyle Manske	June 11, 2026	TBA	N/A
24	"Let's Go Fly an Iron Kite"	Neyah Barbee	Kyle Manske	June 11, 2026	TBA	N/A
Game On: At IQ, Iron Man, Ironheart, and Iron Hulk are training the Smashcade. After training, Riri shows Tony and Amadeus the moves in her favorite arcade video game "Sparklington" where the player controls Spark to get past Gloom and turn on the lightbulb he is guarding. Loki then shows up and casts a spell on "Sparklington" to bring the Gloomies out of the video game and transforms the Smashcade into an actual video game with his own rules. Let's Go Fly an Iron Kite: At the beach, Tony, Riri, and Sam are preparing to fly their respective kites as other kids are shown flying their kites. The kite-flying activities are then crashed by Swarm and her wind-producing Bot-terflies which blow all the kites away as part of a plan to make a big windy mess at the beach.
25	"Wonders of Wakanda"	Joe Morgan	Aynsley King	June 11, 2026	TBA	N/A
25	"Thor and Loki Hit the Road"	Leanna Dindal	Aynsley King	June 11, 2026	TBA	N/A
Wonders of Wakanda: Iron Man and Giant-Man help Black Panther set up the Wonders of Wakanda exhibit at Stark Expo, which displays Wakandan inventions. Unfortunately, Ultron sneaks in and swipes all of the Wakandan inventions where he steals the Panther Gauntlet until he sees the giant-sized piece of Vibranium. He then plans to use the Vibranium to power his giant-size armor. Thor and Loki Hit the Road: Today is RC Remote-Controlled Racer Day at the park as Iron Man, Ironheart, and Thor are in attendance. It also has the Stark Tech RC Racer Turbo Track that Tony and Riri had built as Tony, Riri, Thor, Eggy Eggerson, Melanie Mailperson and others try it out with Thor being advised to decrease his car's speed around corners and speed up at the right time. The event is crashed by Loki who enchants the racers and makes them fly out of control. Then Loki summons his Loki Lowrider while daring Iron Man, Ironheart, and Thor to catch him in order for them to reclaim the stolen racers.
26	"Giant-Man and the Iron Lighthouse"	Written by : Zach Craley; Story by : Joe Morgan	Kyle Manske	June 11, 2026	TBA	N/A
26	"Thor and the Frost Giant"	Marty Isenberg	Kyle Manske	June 11, 2026	TBA	N/A
Giant-Man and the Iron Lighthouse: Giant Man helps Iron Man and Ironheart put together a new lighthouse for the lighthouse keeper Lisa Lighthouse. It will also use an arc reactor to make the lighthouse even brighter. Once it is complete, the unveiling of the lighthouse gets affected when Swarm shows up with an army of Robo-Moths to make a stcky mess of it. Iron Man, Ironheart, and Giant Man must work to protect the lighthouse so that the ships on the water can see it and defeat Swarm and her Robo-Moths. Thor and the Frost Giant: Tony and Thor spend a day at Frosty Falls Water Park run by Lifeguard Lyle. Thor sees the statue of the mascot Frosty Frank who reminds him of the Frost Giants of Jotunheim. As Tony and Thor head to a water slide, Loki shows up and uses his powers to bring Frosty Frank to life and gives the ice cream cone in its left hand the ability to freeze anything. As Frosty Frank starts freezing up Frosty Falls, Iron Man and Thor work to rescue the people so that they and subdue Frosty Frank and defeat Loki.
27	"Sticky Fingers"	Neyah Barbee	Aynsley King	June 11, 2026	TBA	N/A
27	"Swarm's Baseball Swing and a Mess"	Joe Morgan	Aynsley King	June 11, 2026	TBA	N/A
Sticky Fingers: At the farmers' market, Tony, Amadeus, and Helen have set up the Totally Awesome Honey Booth to sell their honey as Amadeus has a brief honey mishap with his hands that Helen solves. Eggy is selling painted eggs and Doug is selling dog treats. Also attending the farmers' market is Absorbing Man who is trying to take Preston's granola bars as Tony, Amadeus, and Helen get him to leave. Displeased with the outcome, Absorbing Man comes across some spilled sticky honey and absorbs its property to commit a heist. Iron Man and Iron Hulk must work to avoid the honey attacks in order to defeat Absorbing Man and reclaim the stolen farmers' market items. Swarm's Baseball Swing and a Miss: The Iron Friends are at the batting cages as Ironheart has made Iron Man and Iron Hulk their own nano baseball bats. Dottie Doubleday introduces the Iron Friends to her brother Dizzy Doubleday who helps Dottie coach a junior baseball league in town. The Iron Friends are then invited to help Dottie and Dizzy build a new baseball field. Upon arrival at Doubleday Diamond, the Iron Friends help to set up the bases, the lights, the baseline, and the floating scoreboard. Afterwards, Swarm arrives with her Pop Flies where they plan to use the baseballs to make a mess out of Doubleday Diamond. The Iron Friends must work to thwart the Pop Flies, defeat Swarm, and open Doubleday Diamond.
28	"Thor and the Legends of Asgard"	Leanna Dindal	Kyle Manske	June 11, 2026	TBA	N/A
28	"The Iron Friends and the Hot Air Balloons"	Written by : Katie Kaniewski; Story by : Marty Isenberg	Kyle Manske	June 11, 2026	TBA	N/A
Thor and the Legends of Asgard: Thor brings Iron Man and Ironheart to Asgard. He shows them around his palace starting with the throne room where his father Odin works. As he is out helping people outside of the palace, he left his crown behind as Thor shows them a painting on when Odin defeated a monster and then shows them the Asgardian training area where Thor often trains. Meanwhile, Ultron has infiltrated Asgard and plans to steal Odin's crown with the help of Nuts, Bolts, and a robotic three-headed dragon as he commits havoc to keep the Iron Friends from interfering. Iron Man, Ironheart, and Thor must work to defeat Ultron and his three-headed dragon before Odin gets back. The Iron Friends and the Hot Air Balloon: Iron Man, Ironheart, Iron Hulk, and Iron Pup head to the Hot Air Balloon Festival overseen by Preston that will include a surprise that Howard Stark is bringing later. Upon arrival, they learn from Preston about hot air ballons as their operators start to inflate them as Tony reveals that his dad is bringing a blimp for them to ride in as it is always in a different shape. The Iron Friends get contacted by Howard Stark and Spark that they are on their way. The Hot Air Balloon Festival then gets crashed by Swarm and her mosquito-like Needle-Nose Bugs as she plots to make a mess by popping all the hot air balloons. With Howard's Spark-like Stark Blimp arrives, the Iron Friends must work to thwart the Needle-Nose Bugs and defeat Swarm before the Stark Blimp is popped.
29	"Giant-Sized Iron Pup"	Marty Isenberg	Aynsley King	June 11, 2026	TBA	N/A
29	"Loki's Monorail Trouble"	Neyah Barbee	Aynsley King	June 11, 2026	TBA	N/A
Giant-Sized Iron Pup: Tony Stark and Scott work on a Pym Particle Launcher where they can make other things grow. They test it out on the cupcakes that Vision brought them only to test it out on Gamma's squeaky toy when a squirrel she was barking is about to fall from a palm tree. Afterwards, Gamma chases the squirrel and causes the Pym Particle Launcer to make the squirrel giant-size as the Pym Particle Launcher gets stuck in the squirrel's tail. Things get worse when Iron Pup is made giant-size as well. While Vision cleans up the mess, Iron Man and Giant-Man chase after Iron Pup and the squirrel as they work to keep things from accidentally being grown and work to get them back to normal size. Loki's Monorail Trouble: At Stark Expo, Howard Stark is shown the new ideas of the monorail by Tony, Riri, and Amadeus. These ideas involve making use of a new engine that will have the monorail zoom around town, upgrading the tracks so that the monorail will glide smooth, and adding extra stops on the route. Howard likes the idea and the upgrades get underway. Once it is upgraded, Howard informs everyone that the monorail is ready. Unfortunately, Loki shows up and transforms it into his own image as he rides around it while casting some spells and takes the monorail off the rails. The Iron Friends work to reclaim the monorail from Loki and get it back to Stark Expo.
30	"Swarm Visits the Pier"	Written by : Asha Bynum; Story by : James Eason-Garcia	Kyle Manske	June 11, 2026	TBA	N/A
30	"Ultron Says"	Leanna Dindal	Kyle Manske	June 11, 2026	TBA	N/A
Swarm Visits the Pier: Iron Man, Iron Heart, Giant Man, and Iron Spider must stop Swarm's robo-crabs before she takes over the pier. Ultron Says: Ultron's Ultron Says Ray controls the city and the Iron Friends must stop him.
31	"The Iron Friends and the Mystery of the Pier"	Neyah Barbee	Kyle Manske	October 12, 2026	TBA	N/A
31	"Absorbing Man's Hiccup Change-Up"	Joe Morgan	Kyle Manske	October 12, 2026	TBA	N/A
The Iron Friends and the Mystery of the Pier: The rides at the pier mysteriously ride around the pier which is caused by Loki, and the Iron Friends must stop him. Absorbing Man's Hiccup Change-Up: Absorbing Man calls the Iron Friends because he has the hiccups which causes him to change into different things he previously absorbs in his adventures, and the Iron Friends must find a way to get rid of them.
32	"The Iron Friends Capture the Flag"	Leanna Dindal	Aynsley King	October 13, 2026	TBA	N/A
32	"The Iron Friends and the Giant Peach Tree"	Marty Isenberg	Aynsley King	October 13, 2026	TBA	N/A
33	"Swarm's Underground Shakedown"	Written by : Neyah Barbee; Story by : Asha Bynum	Kyle Manske	October 14, 2026	TBA	N/A
33	"The Iron Friends in Space"	Written by : Asha Bynum; Story by : Marcial Rios Salcido	Kyle Manske	October 14, 2026	TBA	N/A
34	"Bubble Bubble Ultron Trouble"	Marcial Rios Salcido	Aynsley King	October 15, 2026	TBA	N/A
34	"The Winged Horses of Asgard"	Written by : Joe Morgan; Story by : James Eason-Garcia	Aynsley King	October 15, 2026	TBA	N/A
35	"Swarm's Robo Termite Takeover"	Leanna Dindal	Kyle Manske	October 16, 2026	TBA	N/A
35	"Ultron Traps the Iron Friends"	Marty Isenberg	Kyle Manske	October 16, 2026	TBA	N/A
36	"Absorbing Man and the Super Strong Vibranium"	Neyah Barbee	Aynsley King	November 13, 2026 (Note: This episode was released on Disney+ on October 28, 2026.)	TBA	TBD
36	"Captain America and Loki's Shield Chase"	Joe Morgan	Aynsley King	November 13, 2026	TBA	TBD
37	"A Very Iron Christmas"	N/A	TBA	November 30, 2026	TBA	TBD
37	"Hanukkah with the Iron Friends"	N/A	TBA	November 30, 2026	TBA	TBD

== Shorts ==
Note: The shorts are titled Meet Iron Man and His Awesome Friends.

No.	Title	Original release date
1	"Meet the IQ"	July 14, 2025
Genius inventor Tony Stark unveils the Iron Quarters, showcasing its advanced tech and how it supports the team's missions, and introduces the other members of the Iron Friends team: Ironheart, Iron Hulk, Iron Pup, and Vision.
2	"Meet Iron Man"	July 15, 2025
Tony Stark introduces himself and his iconic Iron Man armor, explaining his role as the Iron Friends' leader and protector. Iron Man solves the problem with the stuck Ferris wheel at the pier.
3	"Meet Ironheart"	July 15, 2025
Riri Williams steps into the spotlight, demonstrating her intelligence and unique Ironheart suit, by helping the Iron Friends stop a giant rolling donut.
4	"Meet Iron Hulk"	July 15, 2025
A fusion of brute strength and technology is revealed through Iron Hulk, who balances power with armor enhancements. Iron Hulk helps Iron Man rescue a kitten from atop a tree.
5	"Meet Iron Pup"	July 15, 2025
The team's adorable canine companion, Iron Pup, is introduced, highlighting his clever gadgets and loyalty. The Iron Friends work together to retrieve Iron Pup's flying disc from Absorbing Man.
6	"Meet Captain America"	July 15, 2025
Sam Wilson's Captain America joins the group, bringing his leadership skills and iconic shield to the battle against evil, and helps stop Swarm from attacking the Iron Quarters.
7	"Meet Iron Spider"	July 15, 2025
Anya Corazon shows off her Iron Spider suit, blending agility with advanced web-based tech. Iron Spider and Iron Man save the pier from Swarm.
8	"Meet Black Panther"	July 15, 2025
T'Challa arrives, combining royal strength and Vibranium-powered armor to support the team. Black Panther helps the Iron Friends save people from Swarm at the Stark Expo.
9	"Meet Ultron"	July 15, 2025
The sinister A.I. villain Ultron is introduced, challenging the heroes with his robotic army and cunning intellect. Iron Man battles Ultron who attempts to steal a robotic racer.
10	"Meet Vision"	July 15, 2025
Vision's synthetic consciousness and powerful abilities are revealed as he joins the heroes to fight alongside them.
11	"Giant Size Iron Friends"	April 13, 2026
12	"Iron Jet-Setting"	April 13, 2026
13	"The Mighty Thor"	April 14, 2026
14	"Gigantic Giant-Man"	April 14, 2026
Giant-Man helps Iron Man and Herbie Hardhat's construction crew build a monorail track for the city since their crane is broken. Then Iron Man and Giant-Man prevent a landslide that Giant-Man accidentally caused from ruining the monorail track
15	"Ultron Goes Giant-Sized"	April 14, 2026
16	"Hawkeyes Can't Fly"	April 14, 2026
17	"Lunch with Loki"	April 14, 2026
18	"The Cap Cycle"	April 14, 2026
19	"The Flying Panther"	April 14, 2026
20	"Rock N Roll Starks"	April 14, 2026

== Production ==
=== Development ===
On October 15, 2024, Marvel Studios Animation and Disney Jr. announced Iron Man and His Awesome Friends, a preschool animated series based on Iron Man and co-produced by Atomic Cartoons, as a spin-off of Spidey and His Amazing Friends. The series is produced as part of Marvel Studios' initiative to introduce Marvel characters to younger audiences. Harrison Wilcox and Sean Coyle were set as executive producers, with James Eason-Garcia as co-executive producer and Michael Dowding as series director. Coyle also serves as the series' showrunner.

=== Casting ===
Along with the series' announcement, Mason Blomberg, Kapri Ladd, and Aidyn Ahn were cast as Tony Stark / Iron Man, Riri Williams / Ironheart, and Amadeus Cho / Iron Hulk, while David Kaye was set to reprise his role from previous Marvel media as Vision, and Fred Tatasciore was set to voice the dog Gamma. In May 2025, Tony Hale, Vanessa Bayer, and Talon Warburton joined the cast as Ultron, Swarm, and the Absorbing Man, respectively.

=== Music ===
Matthew Margeson composed the series' score. Mark Hoppus of Blink-182 composed the theme song, titled "Totally Awesome". The song was released as a single on June 27, 2025. A soundtrack for the series, featuring seven original songs, was released on August 15, 2025.

== Release ==
=== Marketing ===
A story based on Iron Man and His Awesome Friends was published by Marvel Comics on May 3, 2025, alongside a Spidey and His Amazing Friends story, as part of a Free Comic Book Day comic. Leading up to the series premiere, a batch of animated shorts titled Meet Iron Man and His Awesome Friends began rolling out on July 14 across Disney Jr., Disney Jr. YouTube, and Marvel HQ YouTube, with all 10 shorts becoming available on Disney+ on July 15. The trailer for the series was subsequently released on July 21.

=== Broadcast ===
Iron Man and His Awesome Friends premiered on Disney Jr. and Disney Channel on August 11, 2025, while its first ten episodes were released the next day on Disney+. Episodes will continue to be released globally throughout 2025 and 2026. Internationally, the series was also made available for streaming on Disney+.

== Reception ==
=== Critical response ===
John Betancourt of Nerds That Geek stated that Iron Man and His Amazing Friends offers younger audiences an age-appropriate introduction to the superhero genre, which is traditionally experienced only in pre-teen or teenage years. He found that the series delivers fun, engaging stories with themes of teamwork, kindness, and perseverance. Betancourt appreciated how the show provides an accessible entry point for children while remaining enjoyable for adults who wish to share the superhero experience with the next generation. He praised its ability to capture the wonder and values of classic comic book storytelling, making it a meaningful and entertaining watch for families. Mike Mack of LaughingPlace said that Iron Man and His Awesome Friends successfully carries over the charm of Spidey and His Amazing Friends, offering a vibrant and fast-paced series that entertains both children and their parents. He found that the show closely follows its predecessor's formula, keeping the same lighthearted structure and rock-infused theme music, which adds a nostalgic appeal for millennial viewers. Mack noted that while the high energy, bright colors, and quick tempo make it exciting, they may be overstimulating for some younger children. He also observed that the concept of a young Tony Stark might feel unusual to longtime Marvel fans familiar with the character's history, though it does not detract from the storytelling. Mack praised the voice cast and the inclusion of popular Marvel characters, concluding that the series is a lively and engaging watch for young audiences and a welcome option for parents seeking family-friendly superhero entertainment.

=== Ratings ===
Streaming analytics firm FlixPatrol, which monitors daily updated VOD charts and streaming ratings across the globe, reported that Meet Iron Man and His Awesome Friends was the second most-streamed title on Disney+ in the United States on July 17, 2025.

=== Accolades ===
Iron Man and His Amazing Friends was nominated for Digital Media at the 2026 NAMIC Vision Awards.

== Tie-in media ==
=== Books ===
- In August 2025, Penguin Random House released a picture book titled Iron Man and His Awesome Friends: Meet the Iron Friends, as part of the World of Reading collection.
- In January 2026, Penguin Random House released another picture book titled Iron Man and His Awesome Friends: Catch That Robot, as part of the Step Into Reading collection.

=== TV specials ===
- On August 8, 2025, it was announced that characters from Iron Man and His Awesome Friends would appear alongside characters from Spidey and His Amazing Friends in two 22-minute crossover specials, both serving as backdoor pilots for the upcoming Avengers: Mightiest Friends (which was announced that same day).
  - The first crossover special titled Spidey and Iron Man: Avengers Team-Up! premiered on October 16, 2025.
  - The second crossover special titled Spidey and the Avengers: Halloween Team-Up! premiered on September 24, 2026.
