= Atomic Cartoons =

Canadian animation studio

Atomic Cartoons, Inc.
- Type: Subsidiary
- Industry: Animation
- Founded: March 1999; 27 years ago
- Founders: Trevor Bentley; Mauro Casalese; Olaf Miller; Rob Davies
- Headquarters: 123 West 7th Avenue, Vancouver, British Columbia, Canada
- Number of locations: 3 (2020)
- Key people: Jennifer McCarron (CEO); Matthew Berkowitz (CCO); Carl Upsdell (Head of 2D Animation); Troy Sitter (Post Production Supervisor); Joey Wilson (Head of 3D Assets)
- Number of employees: 600 (2019)
- Parent: Thunderbird Entertainment (2015–2026); Blue Ant Media (2026–present)
- Divisions: Atomic Originals (US)
- Website: atomiccartoons.com

Atomic Cartoons, Inc. is a Canadian independent animation studio founded in 1999 by former Studio B Productions employees Trevor Bentley, Mauro Casalese and Olaf Miller alongside former Warner Bros. Animation employee Rob Davies. Based in Vancouver, British Columbia, it produces service animation for a wide variety of clients, as well as creating its own properties. Since 2026, the company has been owned by Blue Ant Media.

== History ==
The studio was founded in March 1999 by Trevor Bentley, Mauro Casalese, Olaf Miller, and Rob Davies. Sent back to Vancouver, British Columbia, after losing his job at Warner Bros. Animation following the cancellation of Pinky, Elmyra & the Brain, Davies received a phone call from Sunwoo Entertainment's Jae Moh to help produce Milo's Bug Quest. Together with Miller, Bentley, and Casalese, the four launched Atomic Cartoons to assist in creating the series.

Between 2004 and 2008, the company produced Atomic Betty for Teletoon in association with Breakthrough Entertainment and Tele Images Kids. Atomic's first fully original creation, the show's titular heroine served as the studio's mascot for a number of years.

In 2010, Miller left to launch his own studio. The following year, Jennifer McCarron was appointed head of production. On July 8, 2015, Atomic Cartoons was bought by Canadian production company Thunderbird Films. The three founders remain on board. McCarron was named president and chief executive officer in 2016.

In December 2018, the company opened a second animation studio in Ottawa, Ontario. Its first project was the Netflix series The Last Kids on Earth.

In February 2020, Atomic Cartoons opened its third studio in Los Angeles, California.

In November 2025, Blue Ant Media (who owns Jam Filled Entertainment) announced a deal to acquire Atomic Cartoons and its parent Thunderbird Entertainment in an all-cash deal.

== Productions ==
=== Television series ===
#	Title	Years	Network/channel/platform	Co-producer(s)	Notes
1	Spider-Man Unlimited	1999–2001	Fox Kids	Marvel Studios; Saban Entertainment; Koko Enterprise Co., Ltd. Dong Yang Animation	
2	Courage the Cowardly Dog	1999–2002	Cartoon Network	Stretch Films	Additional storyboards only
3	Milo's Bug Quest	1999–2000	KBS2	Sunwoo Entertainment	Character, prop and background designs, and storyboards
4	The Zeta Project	2001–2002	Kids' WB	Warner Bros. Animation	
5	Max & Ruby	2002–2019	Treehouse TV	Nelvana	Based on the book series by Rosemary Wells. Seasons 6–7 only, previously produced by Silver Lining Productions for the first five seasons, 9 Story Entertainment for seasons 3–5 and Chorion for seasons 4–5.
6	Atomic Betty	2004–2008	Teletoon; M6 (seasons 1–2); Télétoon (season 3)	Breakthrough Entertainment; Tele Images Kids; Marathon Group (season 3)	
7	Krypto the Superdog	2005–2006	Cartoon Network	Warner Bros. Animation	Storyboards only
8	Johnny Test	2005–2014	Kids' WB (seasons 1–3); Cartoon Network (seasons 4–6); Teletoon	Cookie Jar Entertainment; Warner Bros. Animation (seasons 1–2); DHX Media (season 6)	Storyboards for the first season, animation services for seasons 4–6
9	Captain Flamingo	2006–2010	YTV; GMA Network	Breakthrough Films and Television; Heroic Film Company; Philippine Animation Studio Inc.	
10	Click and Clack's As the Wrench Turns	2008	PBS	Howard K. Grossman Productions	
11	Babar and the Adventures of Badou	2010–2015	YTV; TF1; Disney Jr.	Nelvana; TeamTO; Guru Studio (season 1); Pipeline Studios (season 1); LuxAnimation (seasons 1–2)	Based on the original Babar books by Jean and Laurent de Brunhoff. Computer-animated sequel and spin-off to the original Babar television series.
12	Transformers: Rescue Bots	2012–2016	Discovery Family	Darby Pop Productions (season 1); Hasbro Studios	Season 1 only, overtook by Vision Animation and Moody Street Productions for the second season and DHX Media Vancouver for the third and fourth seasons.
13	Rocket Monkeys	2013–2016	Teletoon; Nicktoons	Breakthrough Entertainment; Hornet Films	
14	Ella the Elephant	2013–2014	TVOKids	DHX Cookie Jar Inc. FremantleMedia Kids & Family Entertainment	
15	Little Charmers	2015–2017	Treehouse TV	Spin Master Entertainment; Nelvana	
16	Pirate Express	2015	Teletoon	Sticky Pictures	
17	Nico Can Dance!	2015	Knowledge Network		
18	Screechers Wild	2016		Alpha Group Co., Ltd.	
19	Counterfeit Cat	2016–2017	Teletoon	Wildseed Kids; Tricon Kids & Family; Aardman Animations	
20	Winston Steinburger and Sir Dudley Ding Dong	2016–2017	Teletoon	Entertainment One; Sticky Pictures	
21	Beat Bugs	2016–2018	7TWO; Netflix	Grace: A Storytelling Company; Thunderbird Entertainment (seasons 1–2); Beyond Entertainment; Seven Network	Animation services for seasons 1–2
22	Marvel Super Hero Adventures	2017–2020	Disney Jr.	Marvel Animation	
23	Minecraft Mini Series	2017–2018	YouTube	Mojang Studios; Microsoft Studios; Mattel Creations	
24	Secret History of Comics	2017	AMC	Skybound Entertainment; AMC Networks	Live action docuseries. Provided work for the title sequence as well as animation sequences in the show itself.
25	Legend of the Three Caballeros	2018	DisneyLife	Disney Digital Network; 6 Point Harness; Mercury Filmworks	
26	Cupcake & Dino: General Services	2018–2019	Teletoon	Birdo Studio; Entertainment One; Corus Entertainment	
27	Super Dinosaur	2018–2019	Teletoon	Spin Master Entertainment; Skybound Entertainment; Corus Entertainment	
28	Hilda	2018–2023	Netflix	Silvergate Media; Mercury Filmworks; Nobrow Press (season 1); Flying Eye Books (seasons 2–3)	Animated 8 episodes for season one.
29	101 Dalmatian Street	2019–2020	Disney Channel (UK); Disney+/Disney XD (USA/Canada)	Passion Animation Studios; Disney Branded Television	Loosely based on the 1956 novel The Hundred and One Dalmatians by Dodie Smith and its film franchise.
30	Molly of Denali	2019–present	PBS Kids; CBC Kids	GBH Kids	
31	Lego Jurassic World: Legend of Isla Nublar	2019	Nickelodeon	The Lego Group	
32	The Last Kids on Earth	2019–2021	Netflix	Koko Production Inc. Cyber Group Studios	
33	Hello Ninja	2019–2021	Netflix	Gorilla Poet Productions	
34	Mighty Express	2020–2022	Netflix	Spin Master Entertainment	
35	Trolls: TrollsTopia	2020–2022	Hulu/Peacock	DreamWorks Animation Television	
36	Spidey and His Amazing Friends	2021–present	Disney Jr.	Marvel Animation (season 1); Marvel Studios Animation (season 2–present)	
37	Dogs in Space	2021–2022	Netflix	Netflix Animation; GrizzlyJerr Productions	
38	Pinecone & Pony	2022–2023	Apple TV+	DreamWorks Animation Television; First Generation Films	
39	My Little Pony: Make Your Mark	2022–2023	Netflix	Entertainment One	
40	Oddballs	2022–2023	Netflix	Netflix Animation	
41	Little Demon	2022	FXX	Harmonious Claptrap; Jersey Films 2nd Avenue; Evil Hag Productions; ShadowMachine; FXP	First series from the company aimed at an adult audience.
42	Cocomelon Lane	2023–present	Netflix	Infinite Studios; Moonbug Entertainment	
43	Princess Power	2023–2024	Netflix	Flower Films	
44	Teenage Euthanasia	2023	PFFR; Adult Swim	Williams Street	Animation services for season 2
45	Young Love	2023	HBO Max	Sony Pictures Animation; Lion Forge Animation; Carl Jones Studios; Cherry Lane Productions	
46	Zokie of Planet Ruby	2023	Amazon Prime Video; YTV	Nelvana	Additional production facility
47	Zombies: The Re-Animated Series	2024–present	Disney Channel; Disney+	Disney Television Animation; Bloor Street Productions	
48	Wonderoos	2024	Netflix	7 Ate 9 Entertainment	
49	Lego Pixar: BrickToons	2024	Disney+	The Lego Group; Pixar	
50	Lego Star Wars: Rebuild the Galaxy	2024–2025	Disney+	Lucasfilm; The Lego Group	
51	Mermicorno: Starfall	2025	HBO Max	tokidoki	
52	Super Team Canada	2025	Crave (Canada); Tubi/Peacock (United States)	Electric Avenue	
53	Red Fish, Blue Fish	2025	Netflix	Dr. Seuss Enterprises; Netflix Animation	
54	Iron Man and His Awesome Friends	2025–present	Disney Jr.	Marvel Studios Animation	
55	Cow Squad	2026	YouTube	Chick-fil-A; Bento Box Entertainment	
Upcoming
56	Avengers: Mightiest Friends	2027	Disney Jr.	Marvel Studios Animation	

==== In development ====
Title	Years	Network/channel/platform	Co-producer(s)	Notes
Action Rabbits	TBA	TF1	Blue Spirit; Milkcow Media	
Surf's Up: The Series	TBA	TBA	Sony Pictures Animation	

=== Films and specials ===
Title	Years	Network	Co-producer(s)	Notes
The Angry Birds Movie	2016	Theatrical	Columbia Pictures; Rovio Animation	"Hal & Bubbles" opening
Lego Jurassic World: The Secret Exhibit	2018	NBC	The Lego Group	
Lego Spider-Man: Vexed by Venom	2019	Disney XD	Marvel; The Lego Group	
Curious George: Royal Monkey	2019	Peacock	Universal Animation Studios	
Lego Jurassic World: Double Trouble	2020	Nickelodeon	The Lego Group	
Lego Star Wars Holiday Special	2020	Disney+	Lucasfilm; The Lego Group	
Curious George: Go West, Go Wild!	2020	Peacock	Universal Animation Studios	
Lego Avengers: Climate Conundrum	2020	Disney XD	Marvel; The Lego Group	
Curious George: Cape Ahoy	2021	Peacock	Universal Animation Studios	
Lego Star Wars: Terrifying Tales	2021	Disney+	Lucasfilm; The Lego Group	
Lego Marvel Avengers: Time Twisted	2022	Disney+	Marvel; The Lego Group	
Lego Star Wars: Summer Vacation	2022	Disney+	Lucasfilm; The Lego Group	
Night at the Museum: Kahmunrah Rises Again	2022	Disney+	Walt Disney Pictures; 21 Laps Entertainment; Alibaba Pictures	
Lego Jurassic Park: The Unofficial Retelling	2023	Peacock	The Lego Group	
Lego Marvel Avengers: Code Red	2023	Disney+	Marvel; The Lego Group	
Lego Marvel Avengers: Mission Demolition	2024	Disney+	Marvel; The Lego Group	
Lego Disney Princess: Villains Unite	2025	Disney+	The Lego Group	Sequel to Lego Disney Princess: The Castle Quest (2023)
Spidey and Iron Man: Avengers Team-Up!	2025	Disney Jr.	Marvel Studios Animation	Crossover special between Spidey and His Amazing Friends and Iron Man and His Awesome Friends
Lego Disney Frozen: Operation Puffins	2025	Disney+	The Lego Group	
Lego Disney Princess: Magical Mayhem	2026	Disney+	The Lego Group	
Lego Star Wars: The Mandalorian	2026	Disney+	Lucasfilm; The Lego Group	
Lego One Piece	2026	Netflix	The Lego Group; Shueisha	Adaptation of the first two seasons of the One Piece live-action series.
The Day You Begin	2026	PBS Kids	Jacqueline Woodson	Animated musical
Spidey and the Avengers: Halloween Team-Up!	2026	Disney Jr.	Marvel Studios Animation	Crossover special between Spidey and His Amazing Friends and Iron Man and His Awesome Friends

Other

- The Oblongs (2001; Layout)
- Chub City (2014; scrapped project)
- Five Alarm Funk 'Robot' (2015, music video)
- Vindicators 2 (2022, 10 episodes, short spin-off of Rick and Morty)
- The Mindful Adventures of Unicorn Island (2023, web series)
