= Marvel Animation =

American animation production company

Marvel Animation Inc.
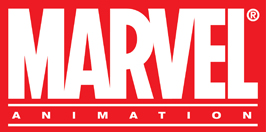

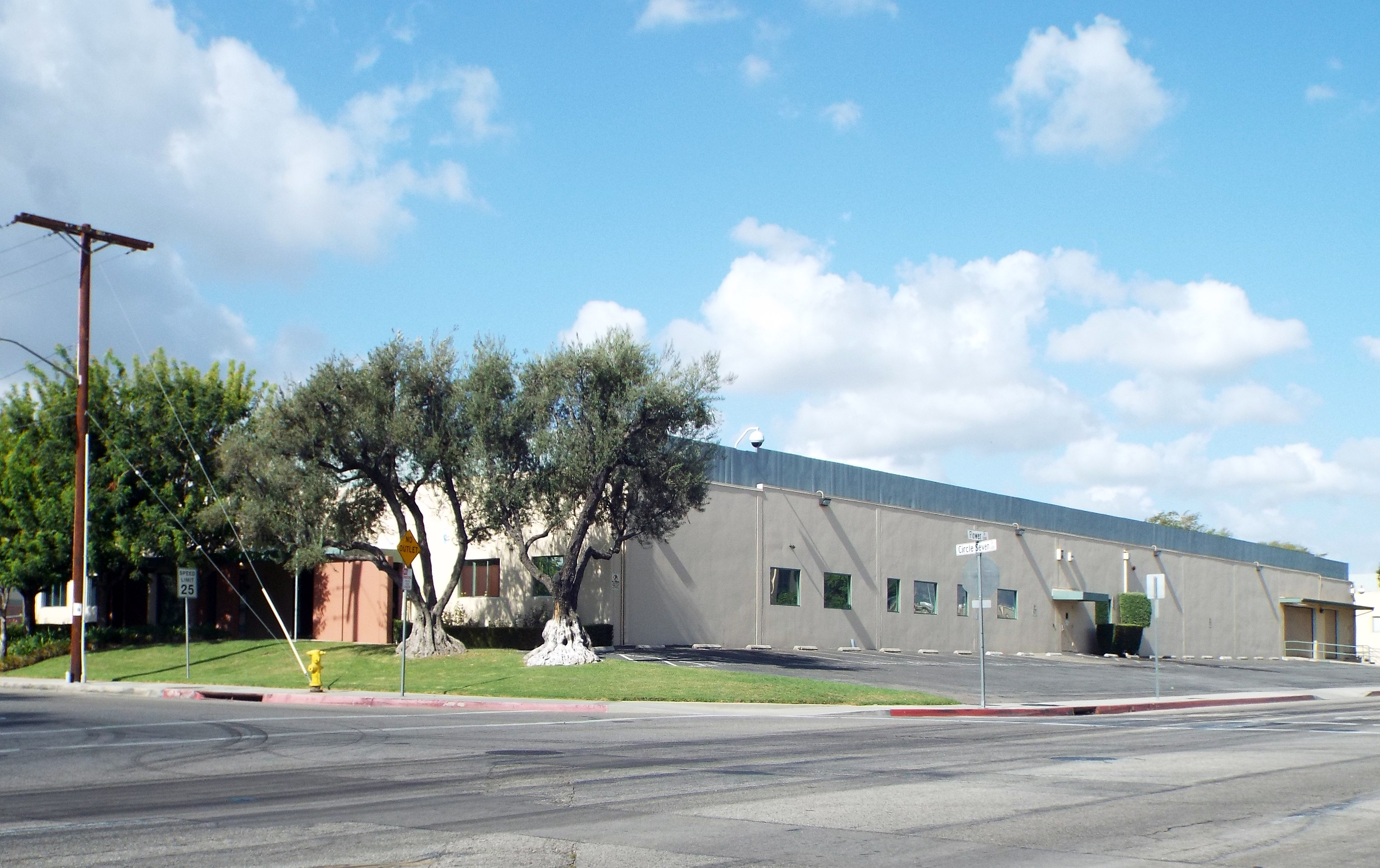
- Headquarters in Glendale, California
- Type: Subsidiary
- Industry: Entertainment
- Genre: Superhero fiction
- Predecessor: Marvel Films Animation; Marvel Productions
- Founded: January 25, 2008; 18 years ago
- Headquarters: Disney Grand Central Creative Campus, Glendale, California, United States
- Products: Animation
- Services: Production; Licensing
- Parent: Marvel Entertainment (2008–2010); Marvel Television (2010–2019); Marvel Studios (2019–present)
- Divisions: Marvel Animation Studios

Marvel Animation Inc. is an American animation production company. It was incorporated on January 25, 2008, to direct Marvel's efforts in animation and home entertainment markets. The incorporated Marvel Animation included then ongoing animation efforts by Marvel Studios with Lionsgate and Nickelodeon. Marvel Animation operates under Marvel Studios, a subsidiary of The Walt Disney Studios, a division of Disney Entertainment, itself a division of The Walt Disney Company.

== Background ==
Marvel Comics Group first entered the animation field through licensing to Grantray-Lawrence Animation for The Marvel Super Heroes anthology series in 1966–1968, The Fantastic Four from 1967 to 1968, and Spider-Man from 1967 to 1969. Marvel worked with Grantray-Lawrence, Hanna-Barbera, and DePatie–Freleng Enterprises on other animated series until 1980.

In 1980, Cadence Industries would purchase the remainder of DePatie–Freleng Enterprises to form Marvel Productions. Marvel Productions was merged into New World Entertainment's operations with the Marvel Entertainment Group's sale to Andrews Group, a Perlman corporation, in 1989. Marvel Productions became New World Animation by 1993.

Marvel Entertainment Group then set up a division, Marvel Films, to work with New World Entertainment's New World Family Filmworks, Inc., both under Avi Arad as president. Marvel Films Animation was set up and produced only a single show, Spider-Man in 1994. During this time, New World Animation and Saban Entertainment produced additional shows, with Saban eventually taking over production.

In August 1996, Marvel Entertainment Group decided to incorporate Marvel Films as Marvel Studios with the sale of New World Communications Group, Inc., Marvel's fellow Andrews Group subsidiary in film and television stations, funded with a sale of Toy Biz stock. In July 1996, Fox Children's Network secured rights from Marvel Entertainment Group for Captain America, Daredevil, Silver Surfer, and additional characters to be developed into four series and 52 episodes over seven years.

== History ==
=== Animated features ===
In 2004, Marvel Entertainment, Marvel Comics' new parent corporation, struck a deal with Lions Gate Entertainment to produce a series of eight direct-to-video animated movies under the name of Marvel Animated Features in conjunction with Marvel Studios, Marvel's direct film subsidiary. Eric Rollman was hired by Marvel as Executive Vice President, Home Entertainment & TV Production for Marvel Studios to oversee the deal with Lionsgate.

=== Incorporation ===
Marvel Animation was incorporated in January 2008 to direct Marvel's efforts in animation and home entertainment markets including then animation efforts with Lionsgate and Nickelodeon. Marvel Entertainment named Eric Rollman as president of the company in April 2008, and reporting to Simon Philips, president of Marvel Entertainment International.

In early 2009, a home distribution deal for The Super Hero Squad Show was inked with Shout! Factory. In April 2009, the Marvel Knights Animation series was announced to be under development with Shout! Factory developing hybrid comic animation DVD series by converting existing material. On December 31, 2009, The Walt Disney Company purchased Marvel Animation with parent company Marvel Studios as part of the Marvel Entertainment group for $4 billion. Both Marvel and Disney have stated that the merger would not affect any preexisting deals with Lionsgate or other production companies for the time being, although Disney said they would consider distributing future Marvel Animation projects with their own studios once the current deals expire.

With the creation of the Marvel Television division in June 2010 within Marvel Studios, Marvel Animation would operate under Marvel TV's direction. In July 2010, Marvel entered into Superhero Anime Partners with Madhouse and Sony Pictures Entertainment Japan to develop and produce the Marvel Anime project that took famous Marvel characters and reintroduced them for a Japanese audience in four 12-part television series which aired on Animax in Japan and G4 in the United States.

In 2012, Marvel established its Marvel Animation Studios based in Glendale, California under Senior Vice President Eric Radomski. On April 1, Disney XD launched a block called "Marvel Universe", with the premiere of Ultimate Spider-Man, followed by the returning The Avengers: Earth's Mightiest Heroes. The block is a result of Disney's 2009 Marvel acquisition. In June, Walt Disney Animation Studios announced they were in development with Marvel to make a film of Big Hero 6.

At San Diego Comic-Con in July, Marvel Television announced a second "season" of Marvel Knights Animation with Shout Factory and the involved titles. Following up on early anime productions in the Superhero Anime Partners, Marvel has re-partnered with Madhouse and Sony Pictures Entertainment Japan as SH DTV Partners for a direct to video anime feature film, Iron Man: Rise of Technovore. Also in October, Marvel Animation Studios announced its first DTV production, a direct to video film, Iron Man & Hulk: Heroes United, to be released in 2013.

Marvel announced in May 2013, that the new shows, Avengers Assemble and Hulk and the Agents of S.M.A.S.H., would be shown on Disney XD as part of the "Marvel Universe" block and would be a part of the same fictional universe. In October, Marvel announced that Disney Japan was producing a new anime television show with Toei Animation called Marvel Disk Wars: The Avengers to be aired on April 2, 2014, on TV Tokyo and other TXN stations.

A Guardians of the Galaxy animated series was officially announced in October 2014, with production set to begin for a 2015 release on Disney XD. In August 2015, Marvel Studios was integrated into the Walt Disney Studios, while Marvel Television and Animation were left under Marvel Entertainment and Perlmutter's control. Marvel announced a new anime television series titled, Marvel Future Avengers, which was broadcast in mid-2017 on the Disney satellite channel, Dlife.

Marvel Entertainment announced a new pre-school franchise, Marvel Super Hero Adventures, in September 2017 consisting of a 10 short-form episodes animated series along with publishing and merchandise during "Marvel Mania" October. In the publishing field, Marvel Press issuing early reader chapter books in September, and of course, from Marvel Comics, a five-issue miniseries in April 2018. Super Hero Adventures has Spider-Man teaming with another Marvel hero. The animated episodes lasting 3-and-a-half minutes aired on Disney Channel's Disney Jr. block followed by Disney Jr. channel then Marvel HQ YouTube channel and DisneyNOW app.

On December 7, 2017, Marvel announced its Marvel Rising franchise focusing on new characters as youngsters starting with animation in 2018 with Ghost-Spider, a renamed Spider-Gwen, shorts and an animated film, Marvel Rising: Secret Warriors.

Marvel Animation's first full-length series for Disney Jr., Spidey and His Amazing Friends was announced at D23 Expo. This series primary stars Spider-Man, Ghost-Spider and Spin and premiered in summer 2021; Marvel Studios Animation replaced the studio as main production company starting from season 2.

=== Under Marvel Studios ===
In October 2019, Marvel Studios president Kevin Feige was given the title of chief creative officer (CCO) of Marvel, and was set to oversee the creative direction of Marvel Television and Marvel Family Entertainment (animation), with both moving back under the Marvel Studios banner. With the December 2019 announcement of the closure of its parent unit, Marvel Television, also came news that TV and animation executives at vice president level and above would be let go. This announcement included Cort Lane, senior vice president of Marvel Animation & Family Entertainment. He would leave in January 2020, and be replaced. Marvel Studios Animation was subsequently formed in 2021.

In 2023, Marvel Animation released Moon Girl and Devil Dinosaur, its first collaboration with Disney Television Animation. The studio is also expected to work with Disney TVA on future Marvel adaptations. No new projects have been announced since, with all future animated productions being handled by Marvel Studios Animation.

== Units ==
=== Former units ===
Note: All Marvel Animated Features films that have been released or announced have been produced by MLG Productions, Marvel and Lionsgate's subsidiary group, and have been released direct-to-video by Lionsgate. The contract Marvel had with Lionsgate was for eight films, all of which have been released as of 2011.

- MLG Productions, Inc. (2006–2011): Marvel Animated Features joint venture with Lionsgate
- SH Anime/DTV partnerships with Sony Pictures Entertainment Japan and Madhouse:
  - Superhero Anime Partners (2010–2011): the Marvel Anime series
  - SH DTV Partners (2012–2013): Iron Man: Rise of Technovore
  - SH DTV AC BW&P Partners (2013–2014): Avengers Confidential: Black Widow & Punisher

== Production library ==
=== Animated series ===
Series	First aired	Last aired	Production by	Network	Episodes
As a Marvel Entertainment subsidiary
Wolverine and the X-Men	January 24, 2009	November 29, 2009	Toonz First Serve; (Toonz Animation India; & First Serve International)	CBBC; Nicktoons	26
Iron Man: Armored Adventures	April 24, 2009	July 25, 2012	Method Films; LuxAnimation	Nicktoons	52
The Super Hero Squad Show	September 14, 2009	October 14, 2011	Film Roman	Cartoon Network	52
The Avengers: Earth's Mightiest Heroes	September 22, 2010	November 11, 2012	Film Roman	Disney XD	52
Iron Man	October 1, 2010 (Japan); July 29, 2011 (US)	December 17, 2010 (Japan); October 14, 2011 (US)	Marvel Anime (Superhero Anime Partners); Madhouse	Animax (Japan); G4 (US)	12
Wolverine	January 7, 2011 (Japan); July 29, 2011 (US)	March 25, 2011 (Japan); October 14, 2011 (US)	Marvel Anime (Superhero Anime Partners); Madhouse	Animax (Japan); G4 (US)	12
X-Men	April 1, 2011 (Japan); October 21, 2011 (US)	June 24, 2011 (Japan); January 6, 2012 (US)	Marvel Anime (Superhero Anime Partners); Madhouse	Animax (Japan); G4 (US)	12
Blade	July 1, 2011 (Japan); January 13, 2012 (US)	September 16, 2011 (Japan); April 2, 2012 (US)	Marvel Anime (Superhero Anime Partners); Madhouse	Animax (Japan); G4 (US)	12
As a Marvel Television subsidiary
Ultimate Spider-Man	April 1, 2012	January 7, 2017	Film Roman; Marvel Animation	Disney XD	104
Avengers Assemble	May 26, 2013	February 24, 2019	Man of Action Studios	Disney XD	127
Hulk and the Agents of S.M.A.S.H.	August 11, 2013	June 28, 2015	Film Roman	Disney XD	52
Guardians of the Galaxy	September 26, 2015	June 9, 2019	Marvel Animation	Disney XD	77
Spider-Man	August 19, 2017	October 25, 2020		Disney XD	58
As a Marvel Studios subsidiary
Spidey and His Amazing Friends	August 6, 2021	present (Note: Replaced by Marvel Studios Animation after season 2)	Atomic Cartoons	Disney Jr.	103
Moon Girl and Devil Dinosaur	February 10, 2023	March 8, 2025	Disney Television Animation; Cinema Gypsy Productions	Disney Channel	41

=== Short series ===
Series	First aired	Last aired	Production by	Network	Episodes
As a Marvel Television subsidiary
Rocket & Groot shorts	March 27, 2017 (Online); April 10, 2017 (Disney XD)	May 1, 2017	Passion Pictures	Disney XD	12
Ant-Man shorts	June 10, 2017	June 11, 2017	Passion Pictures	Disney XD	6
Marvel Super Hero Adventures shorts	October 13, 2017	September 17, 2020	Atomic Cartoons	Disney Channel; Disney Jr.	40
Marvel Rising: Initiation shorts	August 13, 2018	August 13, 2018		Disney XD	6
Marvel Rising: Young Storytellers shorts	February 8, 2019	March 18, 2019		YouTube (Marvel HQ)	7
Marvel Rising: Ultimate Comics shorts	February 20, 2019	March 27, 2019		YouTube (Marvel HQ)	6
As a Marvel Studios subsidiary
It's Jeff & the Avengers	December 20, 2023	October 2, 2024		YouTube (Marvel HQ)	10
Today in Marvel History	February 9, 2025	December 11, 2025	Apus Estudio	YouTube (Marvel HQ)	10
It’s Jeff & His Super Hero Friends	July 17, 2026	August 21, 2026	Apus Estudio	YouTube (Marvel HQ)	6
Fantastic Four: Adventures with H.E.R.B.I.E.	September 4, 2026	October 2, 2026	Apus Estudio	YouTube (Marvel HQ)	5

=== Direct-to-video films ===
Year	Film	Number	Gross (US sales)	Units (US sales)	Refs.
Marvel Animated Features
2006	Ultimate Avengers: The Movie	1	$9,714,891	555,067	
2006	Ultimate Avengers 2: Rise of the Panther	2	$7,868,824	588,073	
2007	The Invincible Iron Man	3	$5,255,749	420,043	
2007	Doctor Strange: The Sorcerer Supreme	4	$3,930,948	258,528	
2008	Next Avengers: Heroes of Tomorrow	5	$3,798,650	308,690	
2009	Hulk Vs	6	$7,544,631	512,736	
2010	Planet Hulk	7	$5,641,789	413,215	
2011	Thor: Tales of Asgard	8	$3,098,791	N/A	
Totals:			$42,935,384	3,199,059	
Others
2013	Iron Man: Rise of Technovore (Marvel Anime)				
2013	Iron Man & Hulk: Heroes United		$206,695		
2014	Avengers Confidential: Black Widow & Punisher (Marvel Anime)		$1,194,989		
2014	Iron Man & Captain America: Heroes United			digital	
2015	Marvel Super Hero Adventures: Frost Fight!			digital	
2016	Hulk: Where Monsters Dwell			digital	

=== TV films ===
Film	Release	Channel	Length (Minutes)	Refs.
Marvel Rising: Secret Warriors	September 30, 2018	Disney Channel; Disney XD	80	
Marvel Rising: Chasing Ghosts	January 16, 2019	YouTube (Marvel HQ)	22	
Marvel Rising: Heart of Iron	March 31, 2019	YouTube (Marvel HQ)	44	
Marvel Rising: Battle of the Bands	August 23, 2019	YouTube (Marvel HQ)	22	
Marvel Rising: Operation Shuri	October 11, 2019	YouTube (Marvel HQ)	22	
Marvel Rising: Playing with Fire	December 18, 2019	YouTube (Marvel HQ)	44	

=== Marvel Knights Animation ===
Marvel Knights Animation is a hybrid comic-animation series. Episodes have been released on iTunes digitally and physically through Shout! Factory on DVD.

Slate

Series	Series Premiere	Episodes
First Season
Spider-Woman: Agent of S.W.O.R.D.	June 14, 2011 (DVD)	5
Astonishing X-Men: Gifted	October 27, 2009 (iTunes) September 28, 2010 (DVD)	6
Iron Man: Extremis	April 16, 2010 (iTunes)	6
Black Panther	January 16, 2010 (TV, Australia); June 23, 2010 (iTunes); November 15, 2011 (TV BET, US)	6 (original); 12 weekly
Thor / Loki: Blood Brothers	March 14, 2011 (iTunes)	4
Second Season
Astonishing X-Men: Dangerous	April 10, 2012 (DVD)	6
Astonishing X-Men: Torn	August 14, 2012 (DVD)	6
Astonishing X-Men: Unstoppable	November 13, 2012 (DVD)	7
Inhumans	April 23, 2013 (DVD)	12
Wolverine: Origin	July 9, 2013 (DVD)	6
Ultimate Wolverine vs. Hulk	September 10, 2013 (DVD)	6
Wolverine Versus Sabretooth	January 14, 2014 (DVD)	6
Wolverine: Weapon X: Tomorrow Dies Today	May 13, 2014 (DVD)	6
Eternals	September 16, 2014 (DVD)	10
Wolverine Versus Sabretooth: Reborn	March 24, 2015 (DVD)	4

== See also ==
- List of animated series based on Marvel Comics
- List of animated films based on Marvel Comics
