= Swarm (Marvel Comics) =

Marvel Comics character

- Swarm as depicted in Runaways vol. 2 #7 (August 2005). Art by Takeshi Miyazawa.

Publication information
- Publisher: Marvel Comics
- First appearance: The Champions #14 (July 1977)
- Created by: Bill Mantlo; John Byrne

In-story information
- Alter ego: Fritz von Meyer
- Species: Human mutate
- Team affiliations: Nazi Germany; Exterminators; Sinister Six; Hateful Hexad
- Abilities: Superhuman strength; Flight; Intangibility; Shapeshifting; Insect manipulation

Swarm (Fritz von Meyer) is a supervillain appearing in American comic books published by Marvel Comics. The character was created by Bill Mantlo and John Byrne and first appeared in The Champions #14 (July 1977).

Fritz von Meyer is a former Nazi scientist who avoids capture after World War II and becomes a beekeeper. His experiments on a colony of mutated bees result in his entire body being devoured while his consciousness survives and gains the ability to mentally control bees and other insects. Subsequently reconstructing his body out of bees, von Meyer assumes the criminal identity of Swarm, and battles the Champions before becoming a recurring enemy of Spider-Man.

The character has appeared in several media adaptations outside of comics. He was voiced by Al Fann in the animated series Spider-Man and His Amazing Friends (1981), and Ian James Corlett in Marvel Super Hero Adventures (2017). Original incarnations of Swarm appeared in the animated series Ultimate Spider-Man (2012), Spider-Man (2017), and Spidey and His Amazing Friends (2021) and Iron Man and His Awesome Friends (2025), voiced by Eric Bauza and Drake Bell, Alex Désert, and Vanessa Bayer, respectively.

== Publication history ==
Swarm first appeared in The Champions #14 (July 1977), and was created by writer Bill Mantlo and co-writer/artist John Byrne.

== Fictional character biography ==
Fritz von Meyer was born in Leipzig, Germany, and became one of Adolf Hitler's top scientists specializing in toxicology and melittology. Escaping capture after World War II, he was a beekeeper or apiarist in South America and discovered a colony of mutated bees. Intrigued by their intelligence and passive nature, von Meyer attempted to enslave the queen bee but failed and the bees devoured him, leaving only his skeleton. The bees' unique qualities caused von Meyer's consciousness to be absorbed into them, allowing him to manipulate the hive to do his will while his skeletal remains are inside the swarm itself. His consciousness merged with the hive to the extent that they are one being, calling himself/themselves "Swarm".

Swarm battled the Champions. After being defeated, Swarm resurfaced to battle Spider-Man. In the first of many fights, Spider-Man prevailed against him when the web-slinger's costume was dosed in a new type of insecticide that hurt the bees if they got too close. Swarm lost his/their skeleton in this battle but returned to fight again (no longer having the skeleton but still possessing von Meyer's consciousness), first teaming with Kraven the Hunter against Iceman and Firestar, then against Spider-Man, but feedback from a weapon fired by the Rhino caused Swarm's bee body to disperse temporarily.

Swarm next appears when a Super-Collider from Rand Industries is activated and called his/their attention. Swarm decides mankind should be exterminated so insects can rule the world. Doctor Druid convinced Swarm that mankind will exterminate themselves and the age of insects can begin. Eventually, Swarm was tired of waiting and returned to New York, after a psychic wave generated by Onslaught disrupted the psychic field that bonded him and the bees together. He forced a group of scientists investigating energy fields to help him not only restore his original field, but expand it to grant him control of every bee on Earth. As New York City is invaded by bees, the Scarlet Spider tracked the bees to their destination and — taking advantage of the fact that the swarms' instinctive memory of Raid caused the bees to automatically flinch away from Spider-Man — infiltrated the building to contact the scientists. By claiming that the scientists' equipment is having trouble broadcasting a sufficiently powerful signal through the dome of bees, Scarlet Spider tricks Swarm into allowing a device's construction designed to negate the vibrational frequency that the bees create to allow themselves to fly, presenting it as a means of boosting the existing signal's power. With the bees now grounded, Scarlet Spider subsequently recovers the queen of Swarm's hive and leaves the authorities' care, reasoning Swarm will not be a future threat without her.

Now back with an internal skeleton, Swarm felt that the criminal organization Pride's fall allowed access to their former territory, specifically Los Angeles. However, they are defeated by the Los Angeles' protector Runaways when their bees' mental link is disrupted by electrical blasts.

Swarm regains control over his colony and joins the Chameleon's Exterminators to kill their shared enemy now that Peter Parker's true identity is revealed. Swarm attacks Mary Jane Watson, but the latter sprays Swarm with water while a co-worker smashes Swarm's skeleton. The bees reform around his skeleton as Stark Industries' bodyguards take him away.

Swarm later formed his own incarnation of the Sinister Six with 8-Ball, Delilah, Killer Shrike, Melter and Squid. They attack Spider-Man and the students of the Jean Grey School for Higher Learning. Swarm is dispersed by Hellion, causing the other members to surrender.

Swarm later appeared as a member of the Hateful Hexad alongside Bearboarguy, Gibbon, Ox, Squid and White Rabbit. During the disastrous battle against Spider-Man and Deadpool, the battle is crashed by Itsy Bitsy.

Swarm relocates to Florida, where he encounters Macrothrax and his minions. They are also sentient insect colonies in humanoid form, accidentally created by the invention behind him. Swarm ends up joining forces with Ant-Man and taking a liking to the latter.

== Powers and abilities ==
Fritz von Meyer is a composite being of thousands of bees driven by his human intelligence. He is also technically intangible, as his body is an aggregate of tiny forms. As Swarm, he can fly, assume any shape or size at will, and mentally influence other bees through an ability called apikinesis. Additionally, Swarm possesses expertise in beekeeping, robotics, and toxicology.

== Reception ==
In August 2009, TIME listed Swarm as one of the "Top 10 Oddest Marvel Characters".

Swarm was ranked #29 on a listing of Marvel Comics' monster characters in 2015.

== Other versions ==
=== Marvel Adventures ===
An alternate universe version of Swarm from Earth-20051 appears in Marvel Adventures: Spider-Man #38.

=== Marvel Fairy Tales ===
An alternate universe version of Swarm from Earth-7082 appears in Spider-Man: Fairy Tales #2.

=== Marvel Noir ===
An original incarnation of Swarm from Earth-90214 appears in the Marvel Noir universe. This version is Madame Sturm, a female scientist whose powers are derived from a Spider-God totem.

=== Ultimate Marvel ===
An original incarnation of Swarm from Earth-1610 appears in the Ultimate Marvel universe. This version is Petra Laskov, a Syrian mutant who is later known as the Insect Queen and Red Wasp.

== In other media ==
=== Television ===
- An original incarnation of Swarm appears in a self-titled episode of Spider-Man and His Amazing Friends, voiced by Al Fann. This version is a beehive irradiated by a fallen meteorite's energy, gaining sentience as well as the ability to increase other bees' size and mutate humans into insectoid drones. Swarm attempts to spread its hive mind throughout the universe until Spider-Man, Firestar, and Iceman intervene and launch the meteorite into space to reverse Swarm's effects.
- An original incarnation of Swarm appears in Ultimate Spider-Man, voiced by Eric Bauza in the episode "Swarm" and Drake Bell in "Sandman Returns". This version is Michael Tan, a disgruntled employee of Stark Industries whose body is made of self-replicating nanobots.
- Swarm appears in Marvel Super Hero Adventures, voiced by Ian James Corlett.
- A composite incarnation of Swarm appears in Spider-Man (2017), voiced by Alex Désert. This version is Jefferson Davis, who utilizes purple nanotech bees that grant him a solid form and possess mind-controlling stingers.
- An original female incarnation of Swarm loosely based on Petra Laskov appears in Iron Man and His Awesome Friends, voiced by Vanessa Bayer. This version wears insect-themed armor, wields a scepter that she calls a Zzepter, and commands an assortment of Robot Bugs.
  - Swarm appears in the Spidey and His Amazing Friends episode "Spiders vs Flies", voiced again by Vanessa Bayer.

=== Video games ===
Swarm appears as an unlockable playable character in Marvel Strike Force. This version is a member of the Sinister Six.

=== Miscellaneous ===
- Swarm appears in Spider-Man: Turn Off the Dark, portrayed by Gerald Avery. This version was originally an Oscorp scientist before he was manipulated into becoming Swarm by the Green Goblin and joining the Sinister Six.
- The Symbiotic Warfare Anthophila Restraining Model (S.W.A.R.M.) appears in Spider-Man: City at War.
- Swarm appears in Magic: the Gathering via the Spider-Man set.
