= Marvel Super Hero Adventures =

American television series, 2017 to 2020

- Genre: Action; Adventure; Superhero
- Based on: Avengers by: Stan Lee; Jack Kirby
- Written by: Eugene Son (S1); David Kidd (S2-); Ron Burch (S2-)
- Directed by: Svend Gregori
- Country of origin: United States
- Original language: English
- No. of seasons: 4
- No. of episodes: 40

Production
- Executive producers: Alan Fine; Dan Buckley; Joe Quesada; Cort Lane
- Running time: 3.5 mins.
- Production company: Marvel Animation

Original release
- Network: Disney Channel; Disney Junior; YouTube; DisneyNOW
- Release: October 13, 2017 – September 17, 2020

Marvel Super Hero Adventures is an American short-form animated series based on characters created by Marvel Comics. Aimed at a preschool audience, the shorts first air on Disney Channel's Disney Junior block, followed by the Disney Junior channel and later the Marvel HQ YouTube channel and DisneyNOW app. The series is animated with Flash animation, but uses the art style of Spider-Man (2017) for framing devices.

== Production ==
Marvel Super Hero Adventures was announced via The Hollywood Reporter on September 7, 2017 as part of a multi-media push across publishing and merchandise aimed at introducing the Marvel Universe to a younger audience. The first season, which consists of ten 3.5 minute episodes, debuted on October 13, 2017. The second season followed on October 22, 2018. The third season began on Disney Junior and DisneyNOW on April 1, 2019, with the fourth on April 6, 2020. No more new shorts were produced as of September 2020.

The series was directed by Svend Gregori and produced at Atomic Cartoons.

== Voice cast ==
- Cole Howard as Spider-Man
- Noel Johansen as Iron Man
- Brian Drummond as Groot
- David Atar as Thor
- James Blight as Hulk
- Adrian Petriw as Ant-Man
- Zac Siewert as Miles Morales
- Aliza Vellani as Ms. Marvel
- Michael Daingerfield as Captain America, Tinkerer
- Jacqueline Samuda as Captain Marvel
- Omari Newton as Black Panther
- Jesse Inocalla as Reptil
- Emily Tennant as Ghost-Spider
- Gigi Saul Guerrero as Spider-Girl
- Deven Mack as Falcon
- Michael Dobson as Ultron, Absorbing Man
- Marlie Collins as Wasp
- Diana Kaarina as Nebula
- Trevor Devall as Rocket Raccoon
- Toren Atkinson as Doctor Strange
- Elysia Rotaru as She-Hulk
- Matt Cowlrick as Loki
- Luc Roderique as Doctor Octopus
- Ian James Corlett as Electro, Swarm
- Mark Oliver as Stegron
- Sam Vincent as Green Goblin, Miek, Blackjack O'Hare
- Andrew Francis as Hobgoblin
- Odessa Rojen as Ironheart
- Nicole Oliver as Morgan le Fay
- Bill Newton as Mister Fantastic
- Lauren Jackson as Invisible Woman

== Episodes ==
=== Season 1 ===
No. overall	No. in season	Title	Written by	Original release date
1	1	"One Big Mess"	Eugene Son	13 October 2017
Spider-Man teams up with Iron Man when Ultron plans to pollute the city.
2	2	"Uh Oh, It's Magic!"	Eugene Son	13 October 2017
Spider-Man teams up with Thor when Loki plans to ruin everybody's summer fun.
3	3	"That Drone Cat"	Eugene Son	27 October 2017
Spider-Man and Miles Morales thwart Doctor Octopus' heist and then work to rescue a kid's cat named Mittens who ran into a factory.
4	4	"Rock and Roll"	Eugene Son	27 October 2017
When a rockslide threatens to collapse a bridge, Spider-Man and Ant-Man must persuade Hulk to follow their advice when it comes to helping the trapped people.
5	5	"Electric Youth"	Eugene Son	27 October 2017
Spider-Man teams up with Ms. Marvel when Electro robs a bank.
6	6	"The Toys Are Back In Town"	Eugene Son	1 December 2017
Spider-Man teams up with Captain America when Tinkerer steals everyone's toys and combines them into a dangerous robot.
7	7	"Way Outer Space"	Eugene Son	1 December 2017
Spider-Man teams up with Captain Marvel to save the astronauts on a malfunctioning shuttle.
8	8	"Family Friendly"	Eugene Son	1 December 2017
Black Panther teaches Spider-Man the importance of family when they team up to fight Absorbing Man.
9	9	"Stomp and Listen"	Eugene Son	1 December 2017
Spider-Man teams up with Wasp when Rhino goes on a rampage.
10	10	"I'm Positive!"	Eugene Son	1 December 2017
Reptil teaches Spider-Man about being positive when they team up to fight Stegron when he robs a museum. Note: This is Stegron's first appearance on TV.

=== Season 2 ===
No. overall	No. in season	Title	Written by	Original release date
11	1	"Evil Mittens"	David Kidd & Ron Burch	26 October 2018
Spider-Man, Ant-Man, and Wasp work together to get Mittens down from the tree. Unfortunately, Ant-Man uses a growing disk on Mittens causing him to go on a rampage.
12	2	"Doctor Octopus’s Garden"	David Kidd & Ron Burch	26 October 2018
Spider-Man teams up with Ghost-Spider when Doctor Octopus steals the Green Diamond and other green things in a museum.
13	3	"Mine!"	David Kidd & Ron Burch	2 November 2018
Iron Man invents a tractor beam at the same time when Rhino has escaped from prison. When Spider-Man borrows it from Iron Man when the tractor beam isn't finished, Rhino gets magnetized enough to attract every item in the city.
14	4	"Now That’s Funny!"	David Kidd & Ron Burch	2 November 2018
When Black Panther unveils a vehicle made from Vibranium, it is hijacked by Ultron. Spider-Man and Black Panther must team up to reclaim the vehicle and defeat Ultron.
15	5	"LISTEN"	David Kidd & Ron Burch	9 November 2018
When Green Goblin robs a bank, Spider-Man accidentally loses Captain America's shield which he can't control as they work to reclaim the shield and defeat Green Goblin.
16	6	"Sticky Mittens"	David Kidd & Ron Burch	19 December 2018
When a beekeeper's honey bees go missing, Spider-Man and Ms. Marvel discover that Swarm is responsible where he plans to have the honey for himself which also prevents the plants from being pollinated. Spider-Man and Ms. Marvel must rescue the honey bees and defeat Swarm and his Techno-Bees.
17	7	"Cloudy With A Chance of Smiles"	David Kidd & Ron Burch	19 December 2018
When Spider-Man gets taken over by the evil Symbiote Venom, Hulk must learn to control his emotions in order to save Spidey and all of New York.
18	8	"That’s Why They Make Chocolate & Vanilla"	David Kidd & Ron Burch	21 December 2018
Spider-Man and Spider-Girl head to an ice cream parlor where their plans to obtain ice cream are thwarted when Electro plans to short-circuit the fuse boxes for the ice cream parlors since the ice cream always melts in his hands.
19	9	"You Go High, I’ll Go Low"	David Kidd & Ron Burch	21 December 2018
When Hobgoblin steals all the money from the bank, Spider-Man goes after him and runs into Falcon who is also after Hobgoblin after he stole Falcon's power ray. They now must work together to defeat Hobgoblin and reclaim the power ray.
20	10	"It's An Alien!"	David Kidd & Ron Burch	6 February 2019
Spider-Man and Captain Marvel come across a crashed spaceship. They discover that its passenger Miek is stealing sugar while leaving green slime.

=== Season 3 ===
No. overall	No. in season	Title	Written by	Original release date
21	1	"Sorry Seems To Be The Hardest Word"	David Kidd & Ron Burch	1 April 2019
As Spider-Man escorts Black Panther to the convention center, they spot Nebula who is carrying a box that contains a replacement part for her crashed ship as her running out into the road causes Black Panther to crash his power car. Spider-Man must persuade Black Panther and Nebula to make up for that incident.
22	2	"The Claws of Life"	David Kidd & Ron Burch	2 April 2019
Spider-Man runs into Rocket Raccoon and Groot when they are tracking down Blackjack O'Hare. As they work together to stop Blackjack O'Hare from stealing gold, Spider-Man must teach Rocket Raccoon that yelling is not the best way to get things done.
23	3	"Not So Dry Cleaners"	David Kidd & Ron Burch	3 April 2019
Spider-Man is recruited by Doctor Strange to help with his Sorcerer Spring Cleaning Time at the Sanctum Sanctorum. After most of it is done, the final thing to do is for Doctor Strange and Spider-Man to wash the Cloak of Levitation.
24	4	"From Hulk to Eternity"	David Kidd & Ron Burch	4 April 2019
While at the beach, Spider-Man accidentally wrecks Hulk's sandcastle while playing volleyball with She-Hulk. When Hulk builds one that is too large enough to threaten the boardwalk, Spider-Man and She-Hulk must help Hulk keep the collapsing sandcastle from burying everything on the boardwalk.
25	5	"Sticky Rain"	David Kidd & Ron Burch	5 April 2019
When the city's new park and playground is having a ribbon-cutting ceremony, it is crashed by a left-out Hobgoblin who starts dumping garbage all over it. Spider-Man and Miles Morales must work to stop Hobgoblin's littering spree.
26	6	"Try It, You’ll Like It"	David Kidd & Ron Burch	2 September 2019
When Spidey is feeling nervous about a mission to outer space, Iron Man reminds his apprehensive apprentice that trying new things is just as important as being confident in what you already know.
27	7	"Bend, Don’t Break"	David Kidd & Ron Burch	3 September 2019
Spidey and Ghost-Spider chase the rampaging Rhino, but when their original plan doesn’t slow him down, Spidey is swiftly reminded that super heroes need to be flexible with their plans.
28	8	"That’s What Friends Are For"	David Kidd & Ron Burch	4 September 2019
When his webs won’t work during a fight with Green Goblin, Spidey is reminded by his flexible super-friend, Ms. Marvel, that he has more than one super power: he also has super-smarts!
29	9	"Happy Birthday"	David Kidd & Ron Burch	5 September 2019
Spidey and Captain America celebrate Cap’s birthday but, of course, no Avenger’s birthday can go uninterrupted! It seems like Loki’s up to his usual mischief... or is he?
30	10	"Things That Go HaHa! In the Night"	David Kidd & Ron Burch	6 September 2019
Spidey and Spider-Girl take on magical menace Morgan Le Fay, but when she conjures a mystical monster, our spider-heroes are forced to face their fears.

=== Season 4 ===
No. overall	No. in season	Title	Written by	Original release date
31	1	"Charge Ahead"	David Kidd & Ron Burch	6 April 2020
Spidey and Ironheart try to find a solution to stop Electro from absorbing the city's electricity.
32	2	"Aww... Do I Have To?"	David Kidd & Ron Burch	7 April 2020
Morgan Le Fay steals the Hulk's super-strength, and he and Spidey must think of another way to stop her.
33	3	"It's On Me"	David Kidd & Ron Burch	8 April 2020
Captain America leaves his bike unlocked and Blackjack steals it, now he and Spidey must outsmart the bounty hunter in order to get it back.
34	4	"Promises Promises"	David Kidd & Ron Burch	9 April 2020
Spidey learns the value of keeping his promise while helping Mister Fantastic on his jet.
35	5	"Outside the Box"	David Kidd & Ron Burch	10 April 2020 (Note: This episode was first released on the Marvel HQ YouTube channel on April 9, 2020.)
Spider-Man teams up with the Invisible Woman in order to stop Swarm from stealing more jewelry.
36	6	"It's Clobberin' Time"	Unknown	13 September 2020
While fighting the Trapster, Spidey and the Thing get glued together and they must find a way to stop him while being stuck to each other.
37	7	"It's Too Darn Hot"	Unknown	14 September 2020
Spider-Man teams up with the Human Torch in order to stop Sandman from stealing money at the beach.
38	8	"One For All and All 4 One"	Unknown	15 September 2020 (Note: This episode was first released on the Marvel HQ YouTube channel on September 14, 2020.)
While attempting to stop Absorbing Man Spider-Man tries to convince the Fantastic Four to work as a team.
39	9	"Building Bridges"	Unknown	16 September 2020
While taking a stroll in the park Spider-Man and Captain Marvel must stop the rampaging Rhino.
40	10	"Obstacle, Of Course"	Unknown	17 September 2020
On Black Panther's birthday, him and Spider-Man must go through an obstacle course designed by Shuri

=== Specials ===
No.	Title	Written by	Original release date
1	"Be Like Spidey!"	David Kidd & Ron Burch	27 February 2019
2	"Meet Captain Marvel!"	David Kidd & Ron Burch	6 March 2019
3	"Meet Thor!"	David Kidd & Ron Burch	13 March 2019
4	"Spidey Remix with Miles!"	David Kidd & Ron Burch	20 March 2019
5	"Spidey Spyin' with Thor!"	David Kidd & Ron Burch	27 March 2019
6	"Spidey Spyin' with Electro!"	David Kidd & Ron Burch	6 July 2019
7	"Meet Ms. Marvel!"	David Kidd & Ron Burch	6 July 2019
8	"Spidey Spyin' with Miles!"	David Kidd & Ron Burch	6 July 2019
9	"Spidey Remix: Villain Fails!"	David Kidd & Ron Burch	7 July 2019
10	"Meet Black Panther!"	David Kidd & Ron Burch	7 July 2019
11	"Meet Iron Man!"	David Kidd & Ron Burch	21 November 2019
12	"Meet Captain America!"	David Kidd & Ron Burch	21 November 2019
13	"Meet Hulk!"	David Kidd & Ron Burch	21 November 2019
14	"Meet Ant-Man & The Wasp!"	David Kidd & Ron Burch	21 November 2019
15	"Spidey Spyin' with Captain America!"	David Kidd & Ron Burch	21 November 2019
16	"Meet Miles Morales!"	Unknown	12 February 2021

== Franchise ==
Marvel Super Hero Adventures was announced by Marvel Entertainment in September 2017 consisting of a short-form animated series along with publishing and merchandise during "Marvel Mania" October. The toy line was manufactured by Hasbro with additional merchandise from Mad Engine, Jay Franco, GBG, Jakks Pacific and others.

== Comic books ==
Marvel Super Hero Adventures is also the name of a comic series aimed at younger readers. Marvel Comics launched the series in April 2018. The series features Spider-Man teaming up with other Marvel heroes. The series aims to introduce preschoolers and young readers to the Marvel Universe by exploring themes of friendship and heroism.

The comics first appeared as a five-issue miniseries, written by Jim McCann and illustrated by Dario Brizuela.

Comics

- Marvel Super Hero Adventures: Captain Marvel - First Day of School (2018) #1
- Marvel Super Hero Adventures: Captain Marvel - Frost Giants Among Us! (2018) #1
- Marvel Super Hero Adventures: Captain Marvel - Halloween Spooktacular (2018) #1
- Marvel Super Hero Adventures: Captain Marvel - Mealtime Mayhem (2018) #1
- Marvel Super Hero Adventures: Inferno (2018) #1
- Marvel Super Hero Adventures: Ms. Marvel and the Teleporting Dog (2018) #1
- Marvel Super Hero Adventures: Spider-Man and the Stolen Vibranium (2018) #1
- Marvel Super Hero Adventures: The Spider-Doctor (2018) #1
- Marvel Super Hero Adventures: Webs and Arrows and Ants, Oh My! (2018) #1
- Marvel Super Hero Adventures: Spider-Man - Across the Spider-Verse (2019) #1
- Marvel Super Hero Adventures: Spider-Man - Spider-Sense of Adventure (2019) #1
- Marvel Super Hero Adventures: Spider-Man - Web Designers (2019) #1
- Marvel Super Hero Adventures: Spider-Man - Web of Intrigue (2019) #1

Collected editions

- Marvel Super Hero Adventures: Spider-Man. Collects Spider-Man Across The Spider-Verse; Web Of Intrigue; Spider-Sense Of Adventure; and Web Designers. (ISBN 9781302917326)
- Marvel Super Hero Adventures: Captain Marvel. Collects First Day Of School; Halloween Spooktacular; Mealtime Mayhem; Frost Giants Among Us; and Ms. Marvel And The Teleporting Dog. (ISBN 9781302915698)
- Marvel Super Hero Adventures: To Wakanda and Beyond. Collects Spider-Man And The Stolen Vibranium; The Spider-Doctor; Webs And Arrows And Ants, Oh My!; Ms. Marvel And The Teleporting Dog; and Inferno. (ISBN 9781302506087)

Early reader chapter books:

- Marvel Super Hero Adventures Book 1: Deck the Malls! teamed Spider-Man with Spider-Gwen written by MacKenzie Cadenhead and Sean Ryan and art by Derek Laufman
- Marvel Super Hero Adventures Book 2: Sand Trap!
- Marvel Super Hero Adventures Book 3: Buggin’ Out!
- Marvel Super Hero Adventures Book 4: Mighty Marvels!
