= The Preiss Company =

- Company type: Private
- Founded: 1987
- Founder: Donna Preiss
- Headquarters: Raleigh, North Carolina, United States
- Key people: Donna Preiss (Founder and CEO) Kirk Preiss (President)
- Services: Student housing
- Number of employees: 500
- Website: www.tpco.com

The Preiss Company is a privately held student housing owner-operator based in Raleigh, North Carolina. The company engages in the acquisition, development, and management of off-campus student housing. It is one of the largest providers of off-campus student housing in USA.

== History ==
The Preiss Company was founded in 1987 by Donna Preiss.

== Overview ==
The Preiss Company is among the top 10 largest privately held student housing providers in United States. It is currently owning and operating properties in 13 states. Their portfolio comprises nearly 33,000 beds in 43 markets/universities. Services of the company include property management; acquisition and development services, including existing acquisitions, garden development, construction management, development consulting, and ground up construction; and consulting services for on-campus and off-campus partners. It also offers construction management, marketing, IT, due diligence and financing services. The company has affiliation with National Multi-Family Housing Council, Commercial Real Estate Women, Institute of Real Estate Management, Certified Commercial Investment Member, National Apartment Association, Urban Land Institute.
