= Alex Bretow =

American film producer, director and screenwriter

- Born: 1992 (age 33–34); Oakland, California, US
- Education: Sonoma State University
- Occupations: Film producer and director
- Years active: 2015–present
- Notable work: The Night; Parallel

Alex Bretow (born 1992) is an American film producer, director, and screenwriter. He is the co-founder of Mammoth Pictures, a production company that focuses on genre films. He is best known for producing the horror film The Night. In 2021, Forbes selected Bretow for its "Next 1000: The Upstart Entrepreneurs Redefining the American Dream".

== Early life ==
Alex Bretow was born in Oakland, California in 1990. His parents are Steve Bretow and Ann Honigman who are Jewish. Bretow began making films when he was eight years old.

He attended Sonoma State University for business and computer science. As a student, he made the short documentary Day in the Life which was shown at the Campus Movie Fest in 2012. He created the short film The Call In in 2013.

While at Sonoma State, he met Mary-Madison Baldo and formed Baldo-Bretow Productions. They created the short action films Snake Eyes and Rampage which were shown at the Campus MovieFest in 2014. Both films were selected and shown by the Cannes Film Festival in 2015. They also created the thriller The Glittering Girl and Snake Eyes Part 2 in 2014. In 2015, the Baldo-Bretow Uproar won second place for Best Picture at the first campus CineNoma film festival, an event co-organized by Bretow.

He worked on the film Burn Country starring James Franco during college.

== Career ==
Bretow and Kourosh Ahari met at the Cannes Film Festival and founded Mammoth Pictures in 2015. Their first production was the film Generations, directed by Kourosh Ahari and financed by Tom Hanks, which won several awards at international film festivals.

In 2020, Bretow produced The Night, a horror film directed by Ahari and starring Cannes Best Actor Shahab Hosseini. The film was a co-production of the United States and Iran, and was shot in Los Angeles with dialogue in Persian and English. The film received positive reviews from critics and audiences, was praised for its Kubrickian style and its portrayal of Iranian immigrants in America.

Bretow also formed Pol Media, a distribution and production company, with Hosseini and Ahari in 2020. Pol Media acquired the rights to the life of Ali Javan. Shahab Hosseini will star in Bretow's biopic of the Iranian physicist Ali Javan.

In 2021, Forbes selected Bretow for its "Next 1000: The Upstart Entrepreneurs Redefining the American Dream".

Bretow was the executive producer of Parallel, a sci-fi thriller directed by Ahari and starring Danielle Deadwyler, Aldis Hodge, and Edwin Hodge. The film is expected to be released in theaters by Vertical Entertainment in the fall of 2023.

In 2022, it was announced that Bretow would produce Diary of a Murderer with Brontë, a crime thriller directed by Ahari. The film is based on the bestselling novella by Young-ha Kim, which Mammoth Pictures acquired the film and television rights to in 2022.

In 2023, Bretow began producing a project based on the Bulgarian Kukeri and the tradition of Surva, a folkloric horror film directed by Ahari. The film is inspired by the Bulgarian folklore of the Kukeri, masked men who perform rituals to ward off evil spirits, which was popularized by The New Yorker's documentary. Bazuka, the Bulgarian production company behind the doc, partnered with Mammoth Pictures on the project.

== Awards ==
- Alameda International Film Festival 2018 – Ensemble Acting Award (Generations)
- California Independent Film Festival 2018 – Best Short (Generations)
- Molins Film Festival 2020 – Best Director; Best Screenplay (The Night)
- Grimm Up North Film Festival 2021 – Best Feature Film (The Night)

== Selected filmography ==
Year	Title	Role	Notes
2018	Generations	Producer	Short film
2020	The Night	Producer	Feature film
2023	Parallel	Executive Producer	Feature film
