= Ms. Marvel =

Comic book superhero created in 1977

- Kamala Khan and Carol Danvers. Variant cover of Generations: Ms. Marvel & Ms. Marvel #1 (November 2017). Art by Olivier Coipel and Laura Martin.
- Publisher: Marvel Comics
- First appearance: Ms. Marvel #1 (January 1977)
- Created by: Gerry Conway (writer); John Buscema (art)
- Characters: Carol Danvers; Sharon Ventura; Karla Sofen; Kamala Khan

Ms. Marvel

Series publication information
- Publisher: Marvel Comics
- Schedule: Monthly
- Format: Ongoing series
- Genre: Superhero
- Publication date: List: (Volume 1) January 1977 – June 1979 (Volume 2) March 2006 – February 2010 (Volume 3) February 2014 – present
- Number of issues: List: (Volume 1) 23 (Volume 2) 50, 1 annual, 3 specials
- Main character(s): List: (Volumes 1–2) Carol Danvers (Volume 3) Kamala Khan

Creative team
- Writer(s): List: (Volume 1) Gerry Conway (#1–2) Chris Claremont (#3–23) (Volume 2) Brian Reed (Volume 3) G. Willow Wilson
- Artist(s): (Volume 1): John Buscema (#1–3); Jim Mooney (#4–8, 13, 15–18); Keith Pollard (#9); Sal Buscema (#10–12); Carmine Infantino (#14, 19); Dave Cockrum (#20–21); Mike Vosburg (#22–23); (Volume 2): Roberto De La Torre (#1–8, 11–12); Mike Wieringo (#9–10); Aaron Lopresti (#13–19, 21–24); Greg Tocchini (#20); Adriana Melo (#25–26, 28–30, 33–34); Andre Coelho (#27); Marcos Marz (#31); Paulo Siqueira (#32); Pat Olliffe (#35–37); Rebekah Isaacs (#38); Sana Takeda (#39–40, 42, 44, 46, 48–50); Sergio Ariño (#41, 43); Philippe Briones (#45); Mike McKone (#47); (Volume 3): Adrian Alphona (#1–5, 8–11, 16–17); Jacob Wyatt (#6–7); Elmo Bondoc (#12); Takeshi Miyazawa (#13–15)

Ms. Marvel is the name of several superheroines appearing in comic books published by Marvel Comics. The character was originally conceived as a female counterpart to the superhero Mar-Vell / Captain Marvel. Like Captain Marvel, most of the bearers of the Ms. Marvel codename gain their powers through Kree technology or genetics. The first incarnation of Ms. Marvel, Carol Danvers, first appeared in Marvel Super-Heroes #13 (March 1968). The second incarnation, Karla Sofen, made her first appearance in Captain America #192 (December 1975). The third incarnation, Sharon Ventura, debuted in The Thing #27 (September 1985). The fourth and current incarnation, Kamala Khan, made her debut in Captain Marvel #14 (August 2013).

== Carol Danvers ==
Carol Danvers is the first character to use the codename of Ms. Marvel. Created by writer Roy Thomas and artist Gene Colan, the character first appeared in Marvel Super-Heroes #13 (March 1968). She was a non-superpowered officer in the United States Air Force. After being caught in an explosion with the Kree superhero Captain Marvel in Captain Marvel #18 (November 1969), Danvers resurfaces in Ms. Marvel #1 (January 1977), with superpowers resulting from the explosion, which caused her DNA to merge with Captain Marvel's. As Ms. Marvel, Danvers becomes a mainstay of the superhero team The Avengers, beginning in The Avengers #171 (May 1978). Danvers goes on to use the codenames Binary, and later Warbird. In July 2012, Danvers assumes the mantle Captain Marvel in honor of its deceased, original bearer, Mar-Vell, after Captain America tells her that Mar-Vell would want her to have it.

== Karla Sofen ==
Dr. Karla Sofen is the second character to use the codename of Ms. Marvel. Created by writer Marv Wolfman and artist Frank Robbins, the character first appeared in Captain America #192 (December 1975). In The Incredible Hulk vol. 2 #228 (October 1978), Sofen becomes the psychiatrist of the villain Moonstone, also known as Lloyd Bloch. Sofen tricks Bloch into giving her the meteorite that empowers him, and she adopts both the name and abilities of Moonstone. During the "Dark Reign" storyline, Sofen joins Norman Osborn's group of Avengers, known as the Dark Avengers, as the doppelganger of the previous Ms. Marvel, Carol Danvers, receiving a costume similar to Danvers' original (Danvers wore the Warbird costume at the time). Sofen becomes the title character of the Ms. Marvel series beginning in issue #38 (June 2009) until Danvers takes the title back in issue #47 (January 2010).

== Sharon Ventura ==
Sharon Ventura is the third character to use the codename of Ms. Marvel. Created by artists Mike Carlin and Ron Wilson, the character first appeared in The Thing #27 (September 1985). She was a stunt performer with the Thunderiders, where she met The Thing. In The Thing #35 (May 1986), Ventura volunteered for Power Broker's experiment to receive superpowers in order to join the Unlimited Class Wrestling Federation with The Thing, taking the name Ms. Marvel. Ventura later joins the Fantastic Four herself in Fantastic Four #307 (October 1987) and, after being hit by cosmic rays in Fantastic Four #310 (January 1988), Ventura's body mutates into a similar appearance to that of The Thing and receives the nickname She-Thing.

== Kamala Khan ==
Kamala Khan is the fourth character to use the codename of Ms. Marvel. Created by Sana Amanat, G. Willow Wilson, and Adrian Alphona, the character first appeared in Captain Marvel #14 (August 2013). She is a 16-year-old Pakistani-American from Jersey City, New Jersey, who idolizes Carol Danvers. Khan was given her own Ms. Marvel series, which premiered in February 2014, becoming Marvel Comics' first Muslim character to headline her own comic book.

== Literary reception ==
=== Volumes ===
==== Ms. Marvel (1977) ====
Claire Napier of Newsarama ranked the Ms. Marvel comic book series 2nd in their "10 Best Captain Marvel stories" list, asserting, "Captain Marvel #18 is a diminished issue for Carol in terms of an active role, but a notable one for what was retconned onto it afterwards. In this issue, Carol appears to die, shot accidentally by Mar-Vell's enemy Yon-Rogg, which leads eventually to 1977’s Ms. Marvel #1, whose cover proclaims 'At last! A bold new super-heroine in the senses-stunning tradition of Spider-Man!' Amen, indeed. Carol returns as a heroine and a features writer-turned-magazine editor, maligned by both the general public who believe her to be a publicity stunt and her editor, J Jonah Jameson, who happily badmouths 'women's lib'. Standing firm on her salary demands, making friends with Mary Jane Watson, confessing to amnesia during a brawl with the Scorpion, Carol is immediately more than she ever was."

==== Giant-Size Ms. Marvel (2006) ====
According to Marvel Comics, Giant-Size Ms. Marvel #1 sold out in February 2006. According to Diamond Comic Distributors, Giant-Size Ms. Marvel #1 was the 121st best selling comic book in February 2006.

==== Ms. Marvel (2006) ====
According to Diamond Comic Distributors, Ms. Marvel #1 was 17th best selling comic book in March 2006. Ms. Marvel TPB: Secret Invasion was 46th best selling graphic novel in March 2009.

Hilary Goldstein of IGN called Ms. Marvel #1 "good, but not a necessity," stating, "Brian Reed is trying to bring two of Marvel's best female superheroes back to the forefront. His first shot, the Spider-Woman: Origin miniseries, is a decent re-introduction to Jessica Drew. Ms. Marvel is a stronger title, however. Reed gets it. Here is one of the most powerful characters in the Marvel U and she has basically been seen as a B player. The contrast between her abilities and her low self-esteem is a great lead-in to a new series. Extra kudos to Reed for acknowledging Danvers ties to both the Avengers and the X-Men. While the focus is on her Avengers past, Reed brings back a classic X-Men villain to end the first issue. A solid start that has the potential to grow into something great."

==== Ms. Marvel (2015) ====
According to Diamond Comic Distributors, Ms. Marvel #1 was 18th best selling comic book in November 2015.

Chase Magnett of ComicBook.com gave Ms. Marvel #1 a grade of A−, saying, "Ms. Marvel is back and every bit as charming, fun, and caring as ever. Even with a new number one and a transition in art, this is clearly the comic that so many readers, both new and old, fell head over heels in love with. The creative team takes advantage of this over-sized issue to hit on all of the highlights of Ms. Marvel as well. Teen friendships and romance, the joy of fandom, over-the-top villains: it's all there in one returning series that couldn't have gotten here soon enough." Jesse Schedeen of IGN gave Ms. Marvel #1 a grade of 8.6 out of 10, asserting, "While much about Kamala Khan's life has changed in the months since Secret Wars, the quality of her comic hasn't. This series deftly picks up where the previous volume left off, building new challenges for its star heroine while doing even more to flesh out her world and the people who inhabit it."

==== Generations: Ms. Marvel & Ms. Marvel (2017) ====
According to Diamond Comic Distributors, Generations: Ms. Marvel & Ms. Marvel #1 was the 43rd best selling comic book in September 2017.

IGN gave Generations: Ms. Marvel & Ms. Marvel #1 a grade of 8.9 out of 10, writing, "As a Carol fan who is more than slightly miffed at her treatment of late, can I just say how great it is to see her back in action, being the hero we all know her to be? All in all, this was a freaking fun comic in a universe that has seemed of late to be nothing but dour. I can't wait to see how – or, perhaps it's better to say if – this comic affects Kamala and Carol's relationship in the future. Even if it doesn't, it was a nice dream. This is the type of comic that reminds you why you love them."

== In other media ==
=== Television ===
- Carol Danvers / Ms. Marvel appears in the X-Men: The Animated Series episode "A Rogue's Tale", voiced by Roscoe Handford.
- Carol Danvers / Ms. Marvel appears in The Super Hero Squad Show, voiced by Grey DeLisle.
- Carol Danvers / Ms. Marvel appears in The Avengers: Earth's Mightiest Heroes, voiced by Jennifer Hale.
- Kamala Khan / Ms. Marvel appears in Avengers Assemble, voiced by Kathreen Khavari.
- Kamala Khan / Ms. Marvel appears in Avengers: Ultron Revolution and Avengers: Secret Wars.
- Kamala Khan / Ms. Marvel appears in Marvel's Spider-Man, voiced again by Kathreen Khavari.
- Kamala Khan / Ms. Marvel appears in Marvel Future Avengers, voiced by Akari Kitō in Japanese and Kathreen Khavari in English.
- Kamala Khan / Ms. Marvel appears in the Marvel Rising series of short films and television specials, voiced again by Kathreen Khavari.
- Kamala Khan / Ms. Marvel appears in Spidey and His Amazing Friends (2021), voiced by Sandra Saad.

=== Film ===
- Kamala Khan / Ms. Marvel appears in Marvel Rising: Secret Warriors, voiced again by Kathreen Khavari.

=== Marvel Cinematic Universe ===
- Iman Vellani portrays Kamala Khan / Ms. Marvel in media set in the Marvel Cinematic Universe (MCU). She first appears in Ms. Marvel. Vellani has reprised her role in the live-action film The Marvels (2023).

=== Video games ===
- Carol Danvers / Ms. Marvel appears as a playable character in Marvel: Ultimate Alliance, voiced by April Stewart.
- Sharon Ventura / Ms. Marvel appears as an alternate costume for Carol Danvers in Marvel: Ultimate Alliance.
- Carol Danvers / Ms. Marvel appears as a playable character in Marvel: Ultimate Alliance 2, voiced again by April Stewart.
- Carol Danvers / Ms. Marvel appears as a playable character in Marvel Super Hero Squad, voiced again by Grey DeLisle.
- Carol Danvers / Ms. Marvel appears as a playable character in Marvel Super Hero Squad Online, voiced again by Grey DeLisle.
- Carol Danvers / Ms. Marvel appears as a playable character in Marvel Avengers Alliance.
- Carol Danvers / Ms. Marvel appears as a playable character in Marvel Heroes, voiced by Danielle Nicolet.
- Carol Danvers / Ms. Marvel appears as a playable character in Lego Marvel Super Heroes, voiced by Danielle Nicolet.
- Carol Danvers / Ms. Marvel appears as a playable character in Lego Marvel's Avengers, voiced by again by Danielle Nicolet.
- Kamala Khan / Ms. Marvel appears as a playable character in Lego Marvel's Avengers, voiced by Ashly Burch.
- Carol Danvers / Ms. Marvel appears as a playable character in Marvel Contest of Champions.
- Carol Danvers / Ms. Marvel appears in Marvel Puzzle Quest.
- Kamala Khan / Ms. Marvel appears in Marvel Puzzle Quest.
- Kamala Khan / Ms. Marvel appears as a playable character in Marvel: Future Fight.
- Kamala Khan / Ms. Marvel appears as a playable character in Marvel Avengers Academy, voiced by Priyanka Chopra.
- Kamala Khan / Ms. Marvel appears as a playable character in Lego Marvel Super Heroes 2, voiced by Rebecca Kiser.
- Kamala Khan / Ms. Marvel appears as a playable character in Marvel Strike Force.
- Kamala Khan / Ms. Marvel appears as a playable character in Marvel Ultimate Alliance 3: The Black Order, voiced by Kathreen Khavari.
- Kamala Khan / Ms. Marvel appears as a playable character in Marvel's Avengers, voiced by Sandra Saad.
- Kamala Khan / Ms. Marvel appears in Marvel Snap
