= Niousha Noor =

Iranian-American actress

- Born: Niousha Jafarian
- Occupation: Actress
- Years active: 2014–present
- Agent: Silver Lining Entertainment
- Father: Hossein Jafarian

Niousha Noor (Persian: نيوشا نور) is an American actress of Iranian descent.

== Career ==
Noor has appeared in numerous TV shows and films, including playing Donya on HBO's Here and Now. In 2020, Noor starred opposite Shahab Hosseini in IFC's psychological thriller The Night, which made history as the first U.S.-produced film to receive a license for a theatrical release in Iran since the 1979 revolution. Her performance as Neda garnered her widespread critical acclaim.

In September 2021, Noor was announced as a principal cast member of the Netflix series Kaleidoscope, as an FBI agent investigating a heist by a team led by Giancarlo Esposito's character. Shortly after production of Kaleidoscope, Noor was cast as one of the lead characters in Maryam Keshavarz's The Persian Version, which had its world premiere at the Sundance Film Festival in 2023, and won the Audience Award in the U.S. Dramatic category. Noor’s portrayal of Shireen, the resolute and unwavering matriarch, garnered widespread acclaim. Rogerebert.com proclaimed, “An outstanding performance from Niousha Noor, who plays Leila’s mother, Shireen, pinches at the heart with painful but striking precision,” Vulture effused, “Noor radiates a complex inner life,” and the Boston Herald stated “an absolutely magnetic and fearless Noor… The Persian Version may be her star is born moment”.

== Filmography ==
=== Film ===
| Year | Title | Role | Director | Notes | Ref(s) |
|---|---|---|---|---|---|
| 2020 | The Night | Neda Naderi | Kourosh Ahari | | |
| 2020 | Foreign | Sheila | Shayan Ebrahim | Short film | |
| 2023 | The Persian Version | Shireen | Maryam Keshavarz | | |

=== Television ===
| Year | Title | Role | Notes | Ref(s) |
|---|---|---|---|---|
| 2015–2017 | Stitchers | Dr. Anna Barmal | Episodes: "Fire in the Hole" and "Just the Two of Us" | |
| 2018 | Here and Now | Donya | Recurring role (7 episodes) | |
| 2022 | The Accidental Wolf | | Episode: "3.2" | |
| 2023 | Kaleidoscope | Nazan Abbasi | Recurring role (7 episodes) | |
| 2023 | 9-1-1: Lone Star | Fara Karim | Episode: "Swipe Left" | |
