= Marvel Rising: Secret Warriors =

2018 American television film

- Promotional poster
- Based on: Marvel Comics
- Screenplay by: Mairghread Scott
- Starring: Dee Bradley Baker; Chloe Bennet; Kathreen Khavari; Kamil McFadden; Tyler Posey; Cierra Ramirez; Kim Raver; Booboo Stewart; Milana Vayntrub; Ming-Na Wen
- Music by: Michael McCuistion; Lolita Ritmanis; Kristopher Carter
- Country of origin: United States
- Original language: English

Production
- Executive producers: Joe Quesada; Dan Buckley; Cort Lane; Eric Radomski
- Producers: Kenneth T. Ito; Howard Schwartz; Kalia Cheng Ramirez
- Editor: Daniel Earley
- Running time: 80 minutes
- Production company: Marvel Animation

Original release
- Network: Disney Channel; Disney XD
- Release: September 30, 2018

Marvel Rising: Secret Warriors is a 2018 American made-for-television animated superhero film produced by Marvel Animation. It is the first full-length film of the Marvel Rising franchise. The movie features several superheroes, such as Ms. Marvel, Squirrel Girl, Quake, Patriot, and Miss America, as they join forces to defend the world against an unexpected threat.

Marvel Rising: Secret Warriors premiered on September 30, 2018, simultaneously on Disney Channel and Disney XD. The film received generally positive reviews from critics.

== Plot ==
Kamala Khan is a teenager who lives in Jersey City, New Jersey, and is also an Inhuman with shapeshifting abilities and lives a secret life as the superheroine Ms. Marvel. She idolizes Captain Marvel, but clashes with her mother, who believes her interest in superheroes is time-wasting, and she has yet to overcome all of the unfortunate difficulties of being a rookie superhero. Kamala and her best friend Doreen Green, a fellow superhero known as Squirrel Girl, stop a thief in the park who steals from a food vendor. The thief is Dante Pertuz, who can control and manipulate fire. The girls also meet Victor Kohl, who is tracking Dante and tells them about how he is working to protect Inhumans from their own destructive powers. Victor and Dante both flee the scene before Kamala and Doreen are approached by S.H.I.E.L.D. agents Quake and Patriot, who have also been tracking violent incidents involving Inhumans. The agents leave, and the two friends decide to find Victor and Dante and solve the Inhuman incidents themselves and prove that Inhumans should be seen as heroes and not threats.

America Chavez has her motorcycle stolen by Dante, who is still unwilling to work with Victor, as he hates his powers for how they ruined his life. An accidental gas explosion in the street forces America, Kamala, Doreen and the S.H.I.E.L.D. agents to work together. Shortly after, Quake is arrested by the agency for unsanctioned action in investigating the Inhumans. Kamala flashes back to when her powers were activated by the Terrigen bomb, and fears that Dante might be struggling with his own powers. She and Doreen argue about if they should trust Dante or Victor. Victor propositions Kamala to join his organisation, and fights her when she declines, as he transforms into his superhuman persona, Exile. He reveals that he is working for Hala the Accuser, who is scouting Inhumans to join the Kree, a militaristic alien race. Exile kidnaps Kamala, and she disappears into a portal. Doreen joins together with America and Patriot to rescue Kamala. They help Quake break out of custody, who joins them and reveals she is also an Inhuman. They are also joined by Captain Marvel, who uses her resources to assist the search.

Kamala wakes up to find that she is a captive in a spaceship cell along with Dante. They are forced by Hala the Accuser to fight each other in order to protect their families; however, they work together to outsmart Hala and escape. The pair also rescue the innocent Inhumans from their imprisonment, and join with Lockjaw, a giant bulldog who can teleport. Captain Marvel and the team arrive and help to fight Exile and Hala. Hala is expelled into space and Exile is defeated, but the spaceship is damaged in the fight. Working together and overcoming their doubts, the team safely lands the spaceship on Earth, and Exile flees. Kamala is overjoyed to meet her idol, but Captain Marvel encourages Kamala to forge her own path and not to follow in her footsteps.

The next day, Kamala and Squirrel Girl make amends, before they stumble upon a secret headquarters. Kamala, Doreen, Dante, America, Quake, Patriot and Lockjaw come together to form an "unofficial" superhero team under Captain Marvel's guidance. Quake is appointed as the leader, and the team are told to train in secret, as they name their team the "Secret Warriors". Kamala looks forward to finding out more about Inhumans and their purpose.

Back at the headquarters, Captain Marvel meets with Captain America, who is pleased to see his student Patriot step out of his shadow. He states his interest in working with an underground team of superheroes.

== Cast ==
- Dee Bradley Baker as Lockjaw and Tippy-Toe
- Chloe Bennet as Quake / Daisy Johnson
- Kathreen Khavari as Ms. Marvel / Kamala Khan
- Kamil McFadden as Patriot / Rayshaun Lucas
- Tyler Posey as Inferno / Dante Pertuz
- Cierra Ramirez as Miss America / America Chavez
- Kim Raver as Captain Marvel / Carol Danvers
- Roger Craig Smith as Captain America / Steve Rogers
- Booboo Stewart as Exile / Victor Kohl
- Milana Vayntrub as Squirrel Girl / Doreen Green
- Ming-Na Wen as Hala the Accuser

== Production ==
On December 7, 2017, Marvel Entertainment announced the creation of a television film titled Marvel Rising: Secret Warriors. The film was executive produced by Joe Quesada, Dan Buckley, Cort Lane, and Eric Radomski. Stan Lee, Sana Amanat, and Marsha Griffin are credited as co-executive producers Screenwriter for the film is Mairghread Scott with Alfred Gimeno as supervising director.

=== Music ===
"Born Ready"

Promotional single by Dove Cameron
- Released: August 23, 2018
- Genre: Pop
- Length: 2:07
- Label: Disney; Marvel Music
- Songwriter: Tova Litvin; Doug Rockwell
- Producer: Doug Rockwell

In August 2018, the film's theme song, "Born Ready," was released on Walt Disney Records VEVO YouTube channel. The song is sung by Dove Cameron, who portrays Ghost-Spider / Gwen Stacy in other Marvel Rising media.

== Release ==
Marvel Rising: Secret Warriors premiered on Disney Channel and Disney XD on September 30, 2018. The film was later made available to stream on Disney+.

== Reception ==
=== Viewership ===
As of March 2019, Marvel Rising: Secret Warriors had been viewed 2.9 million times.

=== Critical response ===
The review aggregator website Rotten Tomatoes reported an approval rating of 100%, with an average rating of 7.50/10, based on 7 reviews.

Chelsea Steiner of The Mary Sue stated Marvel Rising: Secret Warriors is an entertaining and warm-hearted animated film that celebrates diversity and inclusion. She found the story of Kamala Khan and Doreen Green learning to master their powers refreshingly original, especially with its focus on female superheroes and a woman of color in the lead. Steiner appreciated the central friendship between the two female characters, noting how Khan's hesitancy contrasts with Green's upbeat optimism to create a touching portrait of sisterhood. She complimented the film's willingness to tackle mature themes, using discrimination against inhumans as a metaphor for prejudice, and highlighted its positive message about found family and female empowerment. Emily Ashby of Common Sense Media gave Marvel Rising: Secret Warriors a grade of 4 out of 5 stars, describing it as an exciting animated origin story full of action and positive messages. She found that while the film features plenty of hand-to-hand fights, weapons, and explosions, the violence is mild and consequence-free, making it safe for younger viewers. Ashby appreciated the strong themes of teamwork, self-identity, confidence, and embracing one's uniqueness, highlighting how the teen heroes grow from insecure individuals into a united team. She praised Ms. Marvel's emergence as a compassionate leader, America Chavez's inspiring resilience after personal loss, and Daisy Johnson's moral integrity. Ashby also valued the film’s emphasis on female heroes who defy traditional body types and showcase ethnic and LGBTQ+ diversity.

Megan Damore of Comic Book Resources said that Marvel Rising: Secret Warriors delivers a heartfelt and hopeful animated adventure aimed at younger viewers but enjoyable for all ages. She found the film sincere in its themes of acceptance and praised the way it balances a large cast, weaving strong personalities into dynamic relationships without forcing conflicts or introductions. Damore appreciated the standout debut of America Chavez, noting her lively visual design and welcome LGBTQ representation, and highlighted Ming-Na Wen's energetic performance as the villain Hala the Accuser. She praised the vibrant characters, talented voice cast, and uplifting story, while finding the animation less detailed than the preceding Initiation shorts, with bland settings and occasional inconsistencies in character design. Kevin Yeoman of Screen Rant stated that Marvel Rising: Secret Warriors successfully introduces a new wave of diverse Marvel heroes while keeping the story light and accessible. He found the film simple but nimble in balancing team-building action with more personal, human interactions, praising its focus on Kamala Khan as a smart, relatable teen hero. Yeoman appreciated the dynamic between Ms. Marvel and Squirrel Girl, as well as the inclusion of characters like America Chavez and Quake, which broadens representation in Marvel animation. He praised the film's ability to tell a larger adventure within an 80-minute runtime, even if some character backstories felt underdeveloped.

Victor Garett of MovieWeb described Marvel Rising: Secret Warriors as a standout animated superhero film outside the DC universe. He highlighted the film's emphasis on friendship, teamwork, and the responsible use of powers, and praised its focus on diversity and representation, noting that the characters' varied backgrounds and abilities enhance both the narrative and its themes. Joe Garza of Slashfilm asserted that Marvel Rising: Secret Warriors is a wholesome and engaging animated film for younger viewers. He found that it effectively spotlights lesser-known Marvel characters like Kamala Khan, Squirrel Girl, America Chavez, and Patriot, alongside appearances from heroes such as Captain Marvel, Captain America, and Quake. Garza appreciated how the film balances teen superhero struggles with aspirational heroism and its focus on friendship and teamwork. He complimented the way it offers entertainment for both children and older Marvel fans, making the story accessible while still fun for longtime followers of the franchise.

=== Accolades ===
Marvel Rising: Secret Warriors was nominated for Doll of the Year at the 2020 TOTY Awards.

== In other media ==
=== Miscellaneous ===
- In September 2018, Hasbro released a line of dolls based on Marvel Rising: Secret Warriors ahead of the film's debut.
- In October 2018, Marvel Avengers Academy released a limited-time Marvel Rising event to celebrate the launch of Marvel Rising: Secret Warriors.
