= Kaleidoscope (American TV series) =

2023 heist drama miniseries by Eric Garcia

- Promotional poster
- Genre: Heist drama
- Created by: Eric Garcia
- Starring: Giancarlo Esposito; Rufus Sewell; Paz Vega; Rosaline Elbay; Jai Courtney; Tati Gabrielle; Peter Mark Kendall
- Music by: Dominic Lewis
- Country of origin: United States
- Original language: English
- No. of episodes: 8

Production
- Executive producers: Eric Garcia; Russell Fine; Fred Berger; Brian Kavanaugh-Jones; Justin Levy; Ridley Scott; David W. Zucker; Jordan Sheehan; Clayton Krueger; Garrett Lerner
- Producers: Kalen Egan; Brad Carpenter; Christie Colliopoulos
- Production location: Bushwick, Brooklyn
- Cinematography: Niels Alpert; Eric Moynier
- Editors: Ken Eluto; Joe Hobeck; Elizabeth Merrick; Gary Levy
- Running time: 34–56 minutes
- Production companies: Nano Chameleon; Automatik Entertainment; Scott Free Productions

Original release
- Network: Netflix
- Release: January 1, 2023

Kaleidoscope is an American heist drama television miniseries created by Eric Garcia. The eight-part series is an episodic anthology with standalone episodes. It centers on master thief Leo Pap (Giancarlo Esposito) and his crew attempting an epic heist worth $7 billion, but betrayal, greed and other threats undermine their plans. Kaleidoscope was released on January 1, 2023, by Netflix.

== Cast and characters ==
=== Main ===
- Giancarlo Esposito as Leo Pap / Ray Vernon, a career criminal and the leader of his heist crew, who aims to rob the SLS vault
- Rufus Sewell as Roger Salas / Graham Davies, Leo's former partner-in-crime and the CEO of "SLS", a corporate security firm
- Paz Vega as Ava Mercer, a lawyer, Leo's closest friend and the weapons specialist of Leo's crew
- Rosaline Elbay as Judy Goodwin (née Strauss), Stan's ex-girlfriend and the explosives specialist of Leo's crew
- Peter Mark Kendall as Stan Loomis, Leo's former cellmate and the smuggler for Leo's crew
- Jai Courtney as Bob Goodwin, Judy's husband and the safe cracker of Leo's crew
- Tati Gabrielle as Hannah Kim (née Vernon), Leo's pregnant daughter who works as the head of digital security at SLS
  - Austin Elle Fisher portrays a young Hannah Vernon

=== Recurring ===
- Jordan Mendoza as RJ Acosta Jr., the driver for Leo's Crew
- Hemky Madera as Carlos Sujo, Roger's right-hand man and fixer
- Soojeong Son as Liz Kim, Hannah's adoptive sister
- John Hans Tester as Stefan Thiele, one of "The Triplets", a trio of billionaires who entrust $7 billion worth of bearer bonds to SLS
- Niousha Noor as Nazan Abbasi, an FBI agent focused on investigating Leo's Crew
- Bubba Weiler as Samuel Toby, Abbasi's FBI partner

=== Guest ===
- Patch Darragh as Andrew Covington, the former head of digital security at SLS
- Richard Masur as Dr. Wagner, Leo's doctor during his incarceration
- Tina Benko as Jennifer Helman, Abbasi and Toby's superior in the FBI
- Whit Washing as Ted Gough, FBI agent assigned to the jewelry heist
- Robinne Lee as Lily Vernon, Leo's wife and Hannah's mother
- Max Casella as Taco, a criminal-for-hire
- Craig Walker as Samson, Taco's partner and a fellow criminal

== Episodes ==
The eight episodes can be watched in any order. An introduction ("Black") explains the show's concept. The episodes are listed here in the order listed on Netflix's Tudum page.

Title	Directed by	Written by	Original release date
"Yellow" (6 Weeks Before the Heist)	Everardo Gout	Eric Garcia	January 1, 2023
Hannah Kim, who works at the security firm SLS, tests the security of a rival company's vault that belongs to billionaire Stefan Thiele. Impressed, he agrees to work with Roger Salas, the CEO of SLS. Meanwhile, career criminal Leo Pap plans to rob SLS's most secure vault at their company headquarters in New York City. He recruits several former associates including smuggler Stan Loomis, explosives specialist Judy Goodwin, weapons specialist Ava Mercer, skilled driver RJ Acosta Jr, and reluctantly includes Judy's husband, safecracker Bob Goodwin. Leo reveals he has someone inside the company who will aid them. Together, they start planning to steal bearer bonds worth seven billion dollars from a trio of powerful billionaires known as "The Triplets". In order to fund their future heist, they rob a jewelry store but Bob is shot in the hand stealing a butterfly bracelet for Judy. Hannah discovers that she is pregnant, while Roger suspects that someone on the inside has compromised company security. Hannah plants evidence on Andrew Covington, the head of digital security at SLS, which gets him fired and she replaces him. She later secretly meets with Leo, her father, and informs him of her success.
"Green" (7 Years Before the Heist)	Robert Townsend	Evan Endicott & Josh Stoddard	January 1, 2023
Having been incarcerated for over seventeen years, Ray Vernon (Leo Pap) repeatedly attempts to write a letter to Hannah. Stan, who is Leo's cellmate, acts as a distributor of contraband within the prison. Judy, Stan's ex-girlfriend, sneaks contraband in for Stan, which keeps other criminals happy. Stan is jealous and displeased when Judy introduces him to her new partner, Bob, and is later assaulted by a gang hoping to steal his business. After Ray collapses one night, Dr. Wagner, a prison doctor, reveals that he has symptoms of Parkinson's disease. Now determined to escape, he and Stan hatch a plan to break out of prison. They spike the prison cafeteria food with magic mushrooms that acts as a distraction. However, Stan surrenders himself to a guard to allow Ray to escape, who hides in Dr. Wagner's car. Now a free man, Ray meets with Ava, who helps fake his death and gives him the new identity of "Leo Pap". Drug-addicted FBI agent Nazan Abbasi investigates the prison break, aggressively questioning Ava, who files a complaint against her. Ray's "death" seemingly closes the case, but Abbasi is left with suspicions. Ray finds Hannah, having recently been hired at SLS, but she rejects him for abandoning her. Hannah later reads her father's letter, which has been amended to warn her that Roger is not to be trusted.
"Blue" (5 Days Before the Heist)	Everardo Gout	Garrett Lerner	January 1, 2023
Leo breaks the heist down into seven steps that include evading, tricking or disabling the various security systems at the vault. RJ acquires the RF signal from an SLS security truck and works on a fake truck for the crew to drive into the SLS building. Concerned for his safety, he also requests a gun which Judy provides. Having put a backdoor into the vault's temperature sensor system, Leo is confident they can avoid it completely. He breaks into Roger's home, secures his fingerprint, and adds a substance to Roger's contact lenses. The Triplets meet with Roger and request to fence their bearer bonds. He also receives threats over the phone from someone attempting to blackmail him. Paranoid, Roger has the security system checked over, and the backdoor is discovered and patched. The substance placed by Leo later irritates Rogers's eyes and Stan poses as his eye doctor, scanning a copy of his face. Roger correctly suspects that Andrew is behind the extortion attempt and confronts him. He later sends Carlos Sujo, his right-hand man, to kill Andrew, who threatened to unveil Roger's past. Under the cover of a looming storm, the heist is set into motion.
"Orange" (3 Weeks Before the Heist)	Mairzee Almas	Kate Barnow	January 1, 2023
Abbasi attends NA meetings to help regain visitation rights to see her son. After a shell casing from the jewelry store break-ins is traced back to Ava, Abbasi attempts to become involved with the investigation, due to Ava causing her suspension during her investigation of Leo's prison escape. Ava and Bob are able to sell the stolen jewelry to a fence, Javier Zanetti, and use the funds to create the fake SLS security truck, rent a floor in the same office building as SLS and purchase gear for the heist. With RJ's help, the crew are able to map out the inside of the SLS building using the water, ventilation and electrical systems and they locate the vault. Going against her superior Jennifer Helman, Abbasi works with her partner Samuel Toby and attempts to investigate Ava but discovers her association with Bob, Judy and Stan. Believing Ava is meeting the crew's leader, Abbasi tails her but she gets away. Desperate, Abbasi gets Teresa Duarte, Ava's former nanny, arrested by ICE. Meeting with Ava, Abbasi attempts to recruit her as a mole in exchange for Teresa's freedom. Even though she has been compromised, Ava continues to work with the crew.
"Violet" (24 Years Before the Heist)	Robert Townsend	Ning Zhou	January 1, 2023
With the help of Graham Davies (Roger Salas), Ray (Leo Pap) breaks into a home safe belonging to a wealthy banker but must hide inside the safe to evade detection and nearly suffocates. Realising the dangers of his work, Ray spends time with his wife, Lily Vernon, and young daughter, Hannah, and together they open an auto parts store. Planning to put his criminal life behind him, Ray meets with his fence, Ava, and attempts to sell his stolen goods. After Lily is fired from her job at a country club, Ray vengefully plans to rob a Christmas charity auction taking place there. Ray and Graham attempt to steal precious gemstones from the jewelry at the auction, and replace them with fakes. However, Ray is discovered by a security guard and Graham starts a fire hoping that it will give them time to escape, and they steal the remaining jewelry. Lily, who was called into the country club on short notice, gets trapped by the fire and dies after Graham abandons her and Ray. While at the hospital, a distraught Ray is arrested by the police while Hannah goes with Ava for safety.
"Red" (The Morning After the Heist)	Russell Fine	Eric Garcia	January 1, 2023
Leo escapes the flooded vault and leaves the SLS building, retreating to his crew's hideout. As the FBI arrived before the alarms in the vault went off, Judy believes there is a rat among the heist crew. Roger and Hannah arrive at the SLS building and witness the aftermath of the heist, and a diver finds Stan's glasses inside the vault. Carlos visits Stan's wife Barbara Loomis and his mother while posing as a detective. After Stan’s mother mentions a way to find Stan, Carlos kills them both and traces Stan's location. Ava arrives at the hideout in the fake SLS security truck containing the bonds from the vault. However, most of the bonds had been replaced with colored paper. Leo, Judy, Stan and Ava then face off but are interrupted by Carlos and his crew storming the building. After a short confrontation, Carlos and his crew are killed and the FBI later arrive and find their corpses. Abbasi and Toby present Roger with a search warrant who takes them to the vault, which has now been drained of water, and opens his personal safe for inspection but is shocked by an unseen object inside.
"Pink" (6 Months After the Heist)	Mairzee Almas	Kalen Egan	January 1, 2023
Roger is serving twenty years in prison and is visited by Bob, now rendered mute, who wants revenge on Leo and Stan. He recruits two men, Taco and Samson, and they find and kill Zanetti after interrogating him for Ava's whereabouts. Ava is living in Ohio with Teresa and Leo, whose Parkinson's disease has worsened. Meanwhile, Stan and Judy are living in South Carolina with plans to flee the country. Stan attempts to sell Judy's stolen butterfly bracelet but the buyer tips off the FBI. Bob arrives at Ava's hideout, and Ava kills Taco but is knocked out. Leo gives Stan's location to Bob, who ties up Leo, Ava and Teresa, leaving Samson to watch over them. After attempting to escape, Ava and Teresa are killed by Samson, whom Leo stabs to death. Bob drives to South Carolina but is confronted and shot dead by Abbasi. Observing the scene, Judy finds the money in Bob's car and flees with it, abandoning Stan. Not giving up on finding the remainder of Leo's crew, Abbasi is later poisoned by a man working for The Triplets and collapses. Leo returns to New York, where he calls Hannah and meets his granddaughter, Lily. He is then seen walking alone into Central Park, and is followed by a hooded man, Roger's son Brad, who shoots him.
"White" (The Heist)	Russell Fine	Eric Garcia	January 1, 2023
The crew begin the heist while Abbasi stakes out the SLS building. The crew knock out the armed guards, trick the gait detection chamber with bees and bypass the facial and retina recognition systems. Ava releases water to disable the temperature sensors, flooding the vault chamber, allowing Stan and Bob to crack open the safes. Abbasi is misdirected to the floor Ava rented but disables her security feed jammer and Roger discovers he's being robbed. Judy sends the stolen bonds in an elevator but Hannah intercepts them, working with her adoptive sister Liz Kim to replace them with colored paper. Bob betrays the crew out of greed and RJ shoots him but is killed by Judy. Stan witnesses them dumping RJ’s body and after chasing Stan, Bob is strangled by Judy, but later performs an emergency tracheotomy on himself to survive. Loaded with the now fake bonds, Ava leaves in the SLS truck. Carlos reaches the vault but is knocked out by Hannah, saving Leo. She tells him that she intercepted the bonds, as The Triplets allowed their theft, to claim insurance off the loss. Having found the key to Roger's personal safe, Leo places a necklace stolen from the Christmas charity auction inside.

== Production ==
=== Development ===
On September 16, 2021, it was revealed that Netflix had given an eight-episode order for the series, then titled Jigsaw. Eric Garcia serves as creator, writer, and executive producer, along with EPs Ridley Scott, David W. Zucker, Jordan Sheehan, Fred Berger, Brian Kavanaugh-Jones, Justin Levy, and Russell Fine. The series is produced by Scott Free Productions and Automatik Entertainment. It was announced that Everardo Gout and Mairzee Almas would each direct two episodes. It was also announced Robert Townsend would direct multiple episodes of the series. The series is structured in a non-linear order so that viewers can choose the order in which they watch the episodes leading up to the finale.

=== Casting ===
Alongside the series announcement, Giancarlo Esposito, Paz Vega, Rufus Sewell, Tati Gabrielle, Peter Mark Kendall, Rosaline Elbay, Jai Courtney, Niousha Noor, and Jordan Mendoza were cast.

=== Filming ===
Filming began at Netflix Studios in Bushwick, Brooklyn on September 1, 2021. It is the first production at the Bushwick studio. Filming also took place at 28 Liberty in Manhattan's financial district. The series wrapped on March 16, 2022.

== Release ==
The series was officially titled Kaleidoscope in November 2022 when its release date was set for January 1, 2023.

Each episode bears a title associated with a hue or color, which distinctly relates to the main element of that particular episode. The story spans from twenty-four years before the heist to six months after the heist. Netflix tweeted suggestions of different orders in which viewers could watch the episodes; for example, as a Quentin Tarantino film, referencing nonlinear films of his like Pulp Fiction; or as a classic detective story. Netflix's approach of presenting the first seven episodes in any order followed by the White episode allows for 5,040 (7!) permutations. Watching all episodes (including "White") in any order allows for a total of 40,320 (8!). However, Dais Johnston of Inverse noticed that Netflix's recommended orders always ended with "Red" and "Pink" before "White", hinting at 120 (5!) permutations.

== Reception ==
The review aggregator website Rotten Tomatoes reported a 50% approval rating with an average rating of 6.4/10, based on 35 critic reviews. The website's critics consensus reads, "While Kaleidoscope's interactive storytelling offers some flashy novelty, its color-coded story strands are unfortunately all in service to a disappointingly pedestrian plot." Metacritic, which uses a weighted average, assigned a score of 59 out of 100 based on 14 critics, indicating "mixed or average reviews".
