= Ming-Na Wen =

American actress and model (born 1963)

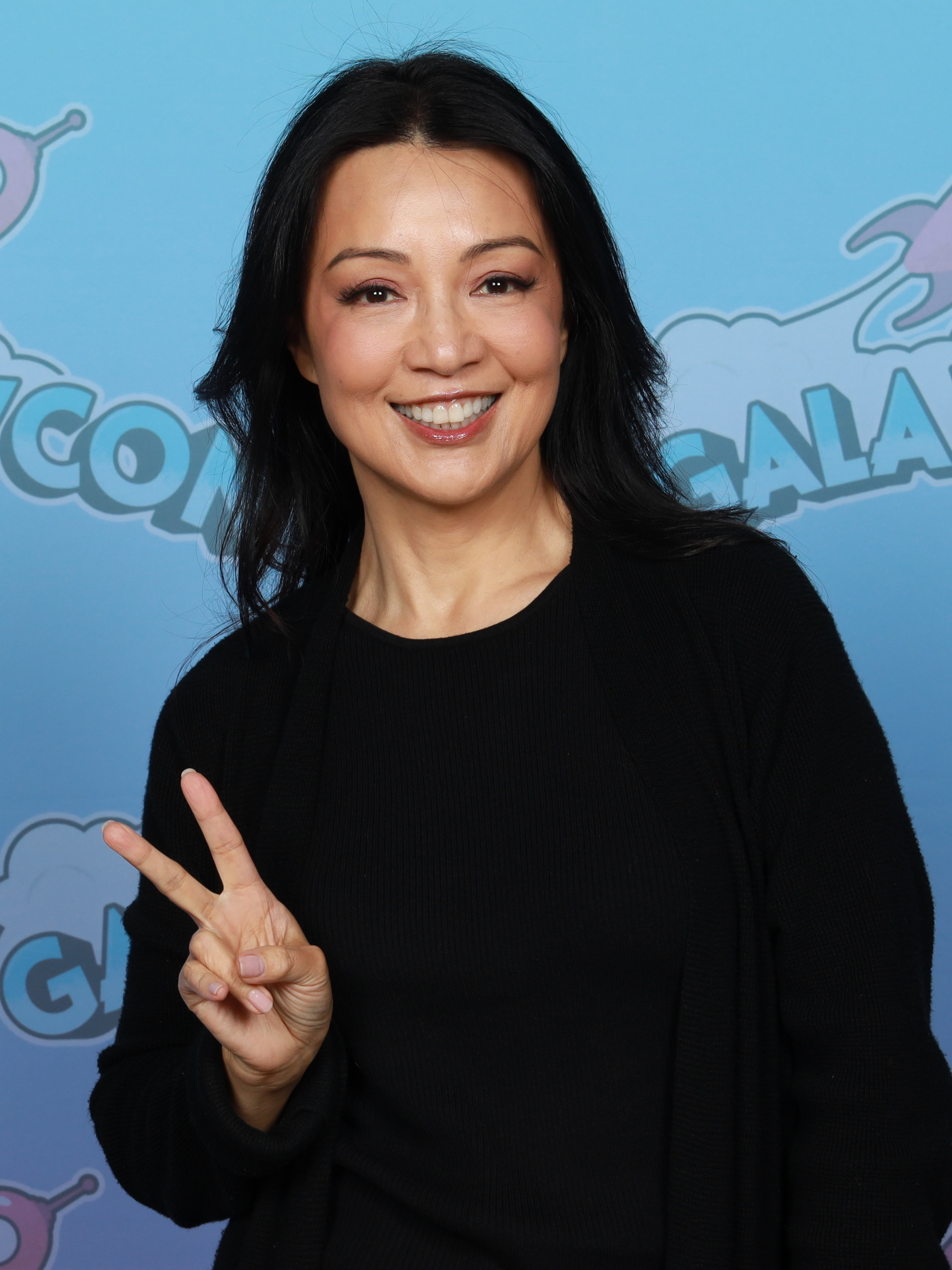
- Wen in 2026
- Born: November 20, 1963 (age 62); Coloane, Portuguese Macau (present-day Macau, SAR of China)
- Other name: Ming-Na
- Citizenship: United States
- Education: Carnegie Mellon University (BFA)
- Occupations: Actress; model
- Years active: 1985–present
- Spouses: Kirk Aanes (m. 1990; div. 1993) Eric Michael Zee (m. 1995)
- Children: 2

Chinese name
- Traditional Chinese: 溫明娜
- Simplified Chinese: 温明娜
Transcriptions
Standard Mandarin
- Hanyu Pinyin: Wēn Míngnà
- Gwoyeu Romatzyh: Uen Mingnah
- Wade–Giles: Wen^{1} Ming^{2} na^{4}
- IPA: [wə́n mǐŋ.nâ]
Wu
- Romanization: Uen Min-na
Yue: Cantonese
- Yale Romanization: Wān Mìhng-nàah
- Jyutping: Wan^{1} Ming^{4}-naa^{4}
- IPA: [wɐn˥ mɪŋ˩ na˩]
Southern Min
- Hokkien POJ: Un Bîng-ná
- Website: www.ming-na.com

Ming-Na Wen (Chinese: 溫明娜; born November 20, 1963) is an American actress and model. She has won multiple awards throughout her career, including an Annie Award and a Saturn Award, in addition to a nomination for a Screen Actors Guild Award. She was honored as a Disney Legend in 2019 and a star on the Hollywood Walk of Fame in 2023.

After gaining attention playing Lien Hughes on the daytime soap As the World Turns (1988–1991), Wen's breakthrough role was as June Woo in The Joy Luck Club (1993). Other early successes include the role of Dr. Jing-Mei "Deb" Chen in the medical drama series ER (1995–2004) and her voice role as Fa Mulan in the Walt Disney Animated Classic Mulan, as well as its sequel Mulan II, several video games and guest appearances in TV shows such as Sofia the First.

Wen is well-known for playing agent Melinda May in the Marvel Cinematic Universe television series Agents of S.H.I.E.L.D. (2013–2020) and has also appeared in the Star Wars franchise as the bounty hunter Fennec Shand, appearing in the television series The Mandalorian (2019–2020), Star Wars: The Bad Batch (2021, 2024), and The Book of Boba Fett (2021–2022). Other notable roles include that of Chun-Li in Street Fighter (1994), Detective Ellen Yin in The Batman (2004–2005), Judge Linda Harris in Two and a Half Men (2007, 2010) and Camile Wray in Stargate Universe (2009–2011).

== Early life, family and education ==
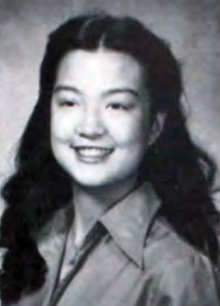
Wen's 1981 Mt. Lebanon High School yearbook photo

Wen was born on November 20, 1963, on Coloane, one of the two main islands of Portuguese Macau. Her mother Lin Chan Wen (Note: Chinese: 林灿文; pinyin: Lín Cànwén) moved to Macau in the 1950s from Suzhou, China, to escape communism. Her father, surnamed Wen, is of Malaysian Chinese descent. She has an older brother Jonathan and a younger brother Leong.

Wen's parents divorced when she was an infant, and she moved with her brother and mother to British Hong Kong, where she attended a Catholic school. Wen retained her father's surname and her mother worked three jobs to provide for the family. Her mother remarried to Chinese American Soo Lim Yee and, when Wen was four years old, the family moved to New York City. Her younger brother Leong was born there.

After five years, Wen's mother and stepfather relocated their family to the Pittsburgh, Pennsylvania area, where they bought and operated the Chinatown Inn restaurant (established in 1943), which is still in business. They resided in the suburb of Mt. Lebanon, Pennsylvania, and Wen attended Mount Lebanon High School. She majored in theatre at Carnegie Mellon University in Pittsburgh, graduating in 1986.

== Career ==
=== 1985–1997: Breakthrough with The Joy Luck Club ===
Wen's first television role was as a royal trumpeter in the children's television series Mister Rogers' Neighborhood in 1985. From 1988 to 1991, she played Lien Hughes, the daughter of Tom Hughes, on the soap opera As the World Turns, becoming the first Asian to be on a contract role in a daytime soap.

After starring in the film The Joy Luck Club (1993), Wen landed the role of Dr. Jing-Mei "Deb" Chen on the NBC drama series ER. It was a recurring role during the 1994–1995 season, and she returned in 1999 as a series regular, remaining on the show until midway through Season 11 in 2004. Wen played Chun-Li in Street Fighter (1994) and co-starred on the sitcom The Single Guy from 1995 to 1997.

=== 1998–2012: Mulan, established actress and other ventures ===
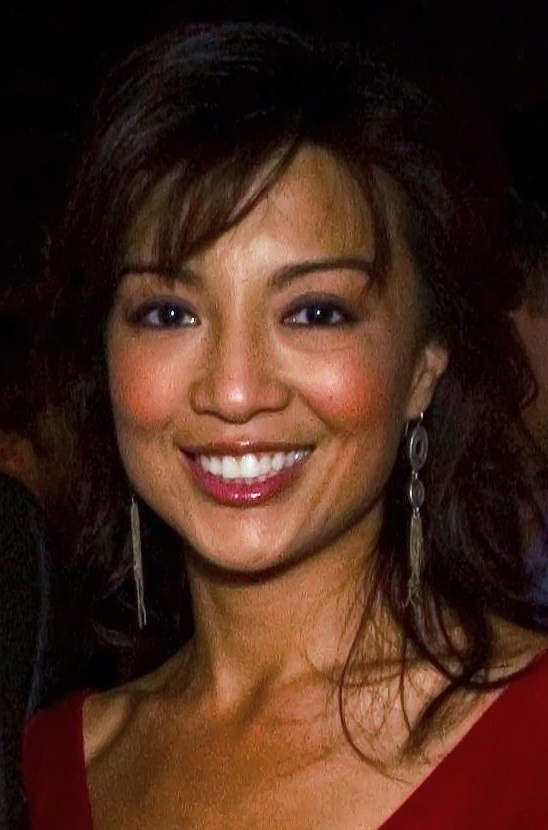
Wen in October 2006

Wen provided the voice for the title character in the 1998 animated film Mulan, its direct-to-video sequel, Mulan II, and the video game Kingdom Hearts II, subsequently winning an Annie Award. She voiced Aki Ross in the animated film Final Fantasy: The Spirits Within and Detective Ellen Yin in the animated series The Batman. She voiced a minor character Jade in the HBO animated series Spawn.

In 2004, Wen won a Hollywood Home Game on the World Poker Tour. In the fall of 2005, she starred on the NBC drama series Inconceivable as the lead character Rachel Lu. The series was cancelled after two episodes. Her next TV role was an FBI agent in the Fox kidnapping drama series Vanished, which premiered in the fall of 2006, but it too was cancelled. She played a college professor in the comedy series George Lopez.

From October 8 through October 29, 2007, Wen (billed as Ming Wen) appeared in a four-episode arc of CBS's Two and a Half Men playing Charlie Sheen's love interest, a judge closer to his own age. In November 2008, she guest-starred on two ABC series: Private Practice and Boston Legal. From December 5 to 6, 2008, Wen starred in a benefit production of the musical Grease with "Stuttering John" Melendez at the Class Act Theatre.

Wen was cast as a regular in the Stargate Universe television series from October 2009 to May 2011 as political attaché Camile Wray. Wen appears in Disney Through the Decades, a documentary short about the history of The Walt Disney Company, hosting the 1990s section.

Wen appeared on the Syfy series Eureka as the inquisitive U.S. Senator Michaela Wen, beginning in season four in 2011 and then serving as a major villain in the fifth and final season in 2012.

=== 2013–present: Agents of S.H.I.E.L.D., Star Wars and other works ===
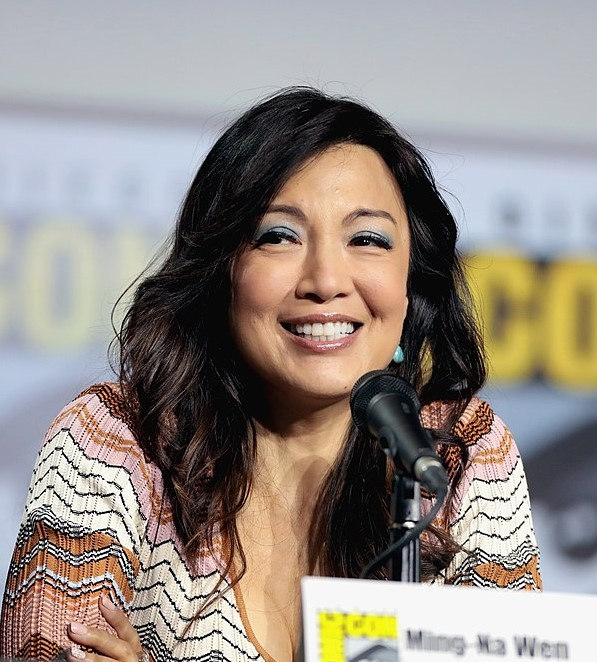
Wen at San Diego Comic-Con in 2019

Wen starred as Agent Melinda May in the ABC superhero drama series Agents of S.H.I.E.L.D., which premiered on September 24, 2013.

In August 2014, Wen reprised her role as Mulan for the first time since Kingdom Hearts II in the Disney Channel series Sofia the First. Wen's daughter has a recurring role on the show as Princess Jun.

On December 7, 2017, Marvel Entertainment launched a new animation film franchise, Marvel Rising: Secret Warriors. Wen voiced Hala the Accuser, the main antagonist of the film, working with Agents of S.H.I.E.L.D. co-star Chloe Bennet. That same year, she once again provided the voice of Mulan in Ralph Breaks the Internet.

In 2019, it was announced that Wen would be a cast member of the Star Wars TV series The Mandalorian playing Fennec Shand. She reprised the role vocally in Star Wars: The Bad Batch and the live-action series The Book of Boba Fett.

In 2022, Wen made an appearance on Young Sheldon as Dr. Lee, an experimental physicist responsible for mitigating conflict within a team of scientists. She is set to recur on the second season of HBO Max's Hacks.

In February 2026, Wen became the new voice of Francine Smith's adopted sister Gwen Ling on the twenty-second season of American Dad!, who was previously voiced in the show's tenth season by Uma Thurman.

In 2026, she will guest star as the goddess Hera in the third season of Percy Jackson And The Olympians.

== Artistry and legacy ==
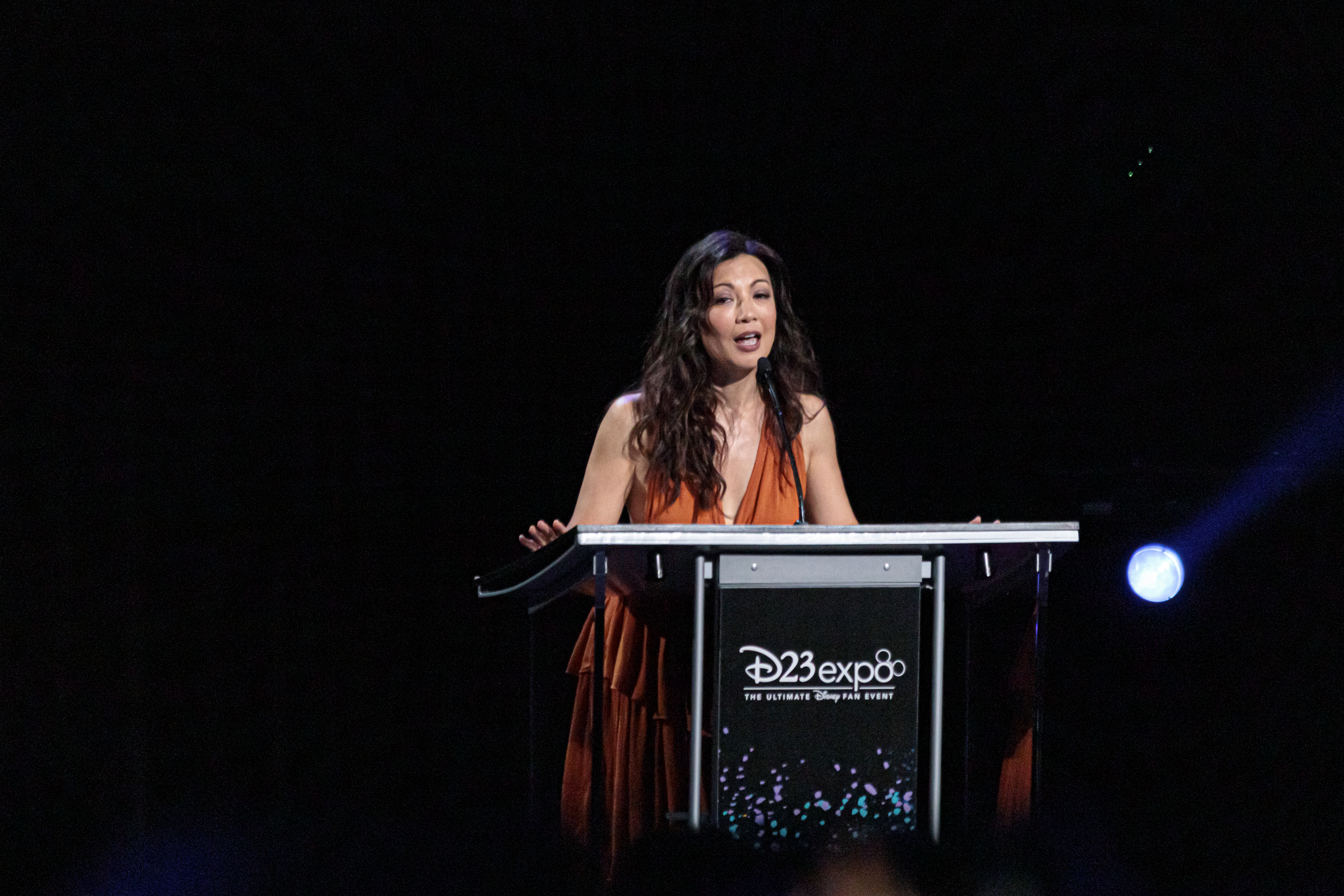
Wen honored as a Disney Legend at the Disney D23 Expo 2019

Wen's roles as Melinda May and Fennec Shand in Agents of S.H.I.E.L.D. and The Book of Boba Fett, respectively, have received critical acclaim. In December 2021, she was included in the list of BBC's 100 Women of 2021. Wen received a star on the Hollywood Walk of Fame in 2023.

She is also well known for her work with Disney. WDW Magazine writer Aaron Widmar called Wen an "incredibly talented Chinese actress, who has had a remarkable career that seems to only gain steam as it progresses—a rarity in Hollywood". He went on to say that she has "broken through barriers for Asian performers". In a 2014 article by a Chinese evening magazine based in Kunming, China, the Spring City Evening News wrote that "among the second-generation Chinese children who immigrated to the United States with their parents, Wen adhered to the excellent Chinese culture and etiquette." She was named a Disney Legend at the 2019 D23 Expo for her outstanding contributions to the Disney company.

== Personal life ==
In 1990, Wen married American film writer Kirk Aanes. They divorced three years later. On June 16, 1995, Wen married Eric Michael Zee and together they have a daughter and a son. Wen's first pregnancy was written into the ER script, with her character placing the child for adoption. Wen's daughter followed her mother's footsteps in voice acting. She voices Princess Jun in the Disney Channel-animated series Sofia the First, credited as Michaela Zee.

Wen is trilingual, fluent in English, Cantonese, and Mandarin. Despite her fluency in Mandarin, she stated that prior to filming Karate Kid: Legends, that her proficiency required improvement for the film. Raised in a Shanghainese-speaking household, she continues to refine her Mandarin by watching C-dramas. She is a Buddhist.

== Filmography ==
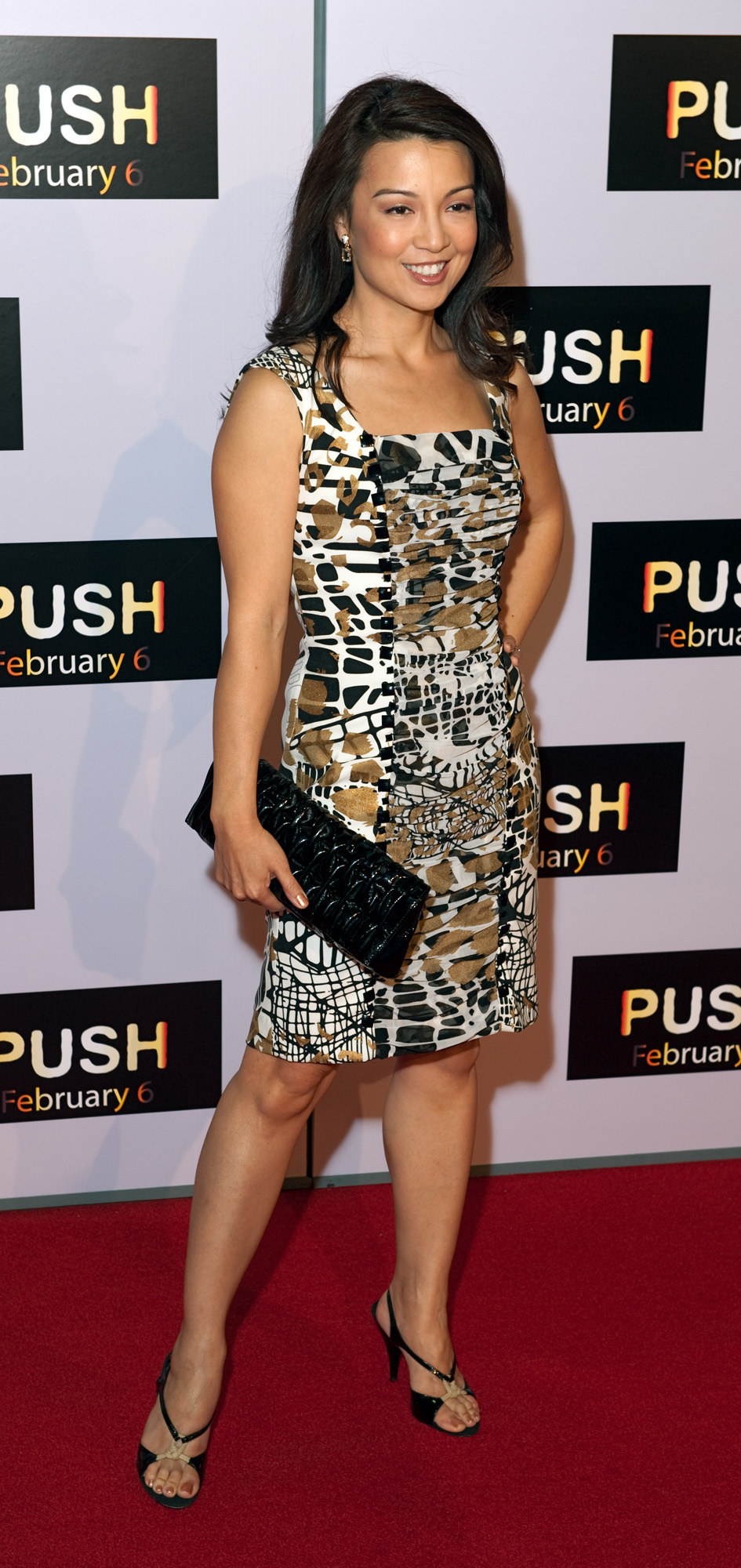
Wen at the January 2009 premiere for Push

=== Film ===
Year	Title	Role	Notes/Ref.
1993	Blind Spot	Mitsuko	Television film
1993	Rain Without Thunder	"Uudie" Prisoner	
1993	The Joy Luck Club	Jian-Mei "June" Woo	
1994	Vanishing Son II	Mai	Television film
1994	Vanishing Son IV	Mai	Television film
1994	Hong Kong 97	Katie Chun	
1994	Terminal Voyage	Han	
1994	Street Fighter	Chun-Li Zang	
1997	One Night Stand	Mimi Carlyle	
1998	Tempting Fate	Ellen Moretti	Television film
1998	Mulan	Mulan (voice)	
1998	12 Bucks	Gorgeous	
2000	Not Black or White	Herself	Short
2001	Final Fantasy: The Spirits Within	Aki Ross (voice)	
2001	Aki's Dream	Aki Ross (voice)	Short
2002	A Ribbon of Dreams	Mei-Ling (voice)	
2002	Teddy Bears' Picnic	Katy Woo	
2004	Mulan II	Mulan (voice)	Video
2004	Perfection	Woman	Short
2008	Prom Night	Dr. Elisha Crowe	
2009	Push	Emily Wu	
2010	BoyBand	Judy Roberts	
2012	Super Cyclone	Dr. Jenna Sparks	Video
2014	April Rain	Hillary	
2014	Parallel Man: Infinite Pursuit	Agent Mackenzie Cartwright (voice)	Short
2016	The Darkness	Wendy Richards	
2018	Marvel Rising: Secret Warriors	Hala the Accuser (voice)	Television film
2018	Ralph Breaks the Internet	Mulan (voice)	
2019	Swimming	Lilian	Short
2020	Mulan	Esteemed Guest	
2020	Pearl	Headmistress	
2021	DC Showcase: The Losers	Fan Long (voice)	Short film; direct-to-video
2023	Glitter & Doom	Ivy	
2025	Karate Kid: Legends	Dr. Fong	
2026	Whatcha Want		
TBA	Persephone		
TBA	Better Life		Post-production

=== Television ===
Year	Title	Role	Notes/Ref.
1985	Mister Rogers' Neighborhood	Royal Trumpeter #3	Episode: "1549 & 1550: Music"
1987	Another World	Abby	Episode: "Episode #1.5950"
1988–1991	As the World Turns	Lien Hughes	Regular cast
1994	All-American Girl	Amy	Episode: "Redesigning Women"
1995–1997	The Single Guy	Trudy Sloan	Main cast
1995–2004	ER	Dr. Jing-Mei "Deb" Chen	Recurring cast (season 1); main cast (seasons 6–11)
1997	Happily Ever After: Fairy Tales for Every Child	Lani (voice)	Episode: "Puss in Boots"
1998–1999	Todd McFarlane's Spawn	Lisa Wu/Jade (voice)	Recurring cast
1999	Oh Yeah! Cartoons	Ming Lan (voice)	Episode: "ChalkZone: Chalk Rain"
2002	Hollywood Squares	Herself/Panelist	Episode: "April 29, 2002"
2003	The Bronx Bunny Show	Herself	Episode: "Episode #1.1"
2003	House of Mouse	Mulan (voice)	Episode: "Salute to Sports"
2004	World Poker Tour	Herself	Episode: "Hollywood Home Game III"
2004	The Adventures of Jimmy Neutron: Boy Genius	Peggy Tsu (voice)	Episode: "The Great Egg Heist"
2004	Law & Order: Special Victims Unit	Li Mei	Episode: "Debt"
2004–2005	The Batman	Ellen Yin (voice)	Recurring cast (seasons 1–2)
2005	Inconceivable	Rachel Lu	Main cast
2005, 2015	Robot Chicken	Mary-Kate Olsen/Tina Nguyen/Ming-Ming Duckling (voice)	2 episodes
2006	George Lopez	Professor Tracy Lim	Recurring cast (season 5)
2006	Vanished	Agent Lin Mei	Main cast
2007	American Masters	Narrator (voice)	Episode: "Novel Reflections: The American Dream"
2007–2010	Two and a Half Men	Judge Linda Harris	Recurring cast (season 5); guest (season 7)
2008	Private Practice	Kara Wei	Episode: "Let It Go"
2008	Boston Legal	Ming Wang Shu	Episode: "Roe"
2008–2014; 2025–present	Phineas and Ferb	Dr. Hirano (voice)	Recurring cast (seasons 1 & 4); guest (season 2)
2009	Ni Hao, Kai-Lan	Gui Nai Nai (voice)	Episode: "Kai-Lan's Trip to China"
2009–2011	Stargate Universe	Camile Wray	Main cast
2011–2012	Eureka	U.S. Senator Michaela Wen	Recurring cast (seasons 4–5)
2011	Celebrity Ghost Stories	Herself	Episode: "Keshia Knight Pulliam, Ming-Na, Chi McBride, Mia Tyler"
2012	Adventure Time	Finn's Mom (voice)	Guest (season 4); recurring cast (season 5)
2013	Nashville	Calista Reeves	Episode: "You Win Again"
2013–2020	Agents of S.H.I.E.L.D.	Agent Melinda May	Main cast
2014–2018	Sofia the First	Mulan/Vega (voice)	Guest (season 2); recurring cast: (season 4)
2015	Hollywood Game Night	Herself/Celebrity Player	Episode: "Cedric Gives Niecy a Hand"
2017	We Bare Bears	Ranger Zhao (voice)	Episode: "Ranger Games"
2017–2018	Milo Murphy's Law	Savannah (voice)	Recurring cast (season 1); guest (season 2)
2017–2019	Fresh Off the Boat	Stephanie/Elaine	Guest (season 3); recurring cast (season 5)
2018	Iron Chef America	Herself/ICA Judge	Episode: "Guarnaschelli vs. Williams"
2018	Celebrity Family Feud	Herself	Episode: "Jeff Dunham vs Ming-Na Wen and Taye Diggs vs Caroline Rhea"
2018	Guardians of the Galaxy	Phyla-Vell (voice)	4 episodes
2018	America 2.0	Helen Chan	Recurring cast
2018–2019	Hot Streets	Soo Park (voice)	Recurring cast (seasons 1–2)
2019	Marvel Rising	Hala the Accuser (voice)	Episode: "Heart of Iron"
2019	Mao Mao: Heroes of Pure Heart	Tanya Keys (voice)	Episode: "Meet Tanya Keys"
2019–2020	The Mandalorian	Fennec Shand	Guest (season 1); recurring cast (season 2)
2020	Awkwafina Is Nora from Queens	Aunt Sandra	Episode: "Vagarina"
2020	50 States of Fright	Susan	Episode: "America's Largest Ball of Twine (Kansas) – Part 1–3"
2021	Yasuke	Natsumaru (voice)	Main cast
2021	Pretty Smart	Jayden's Mom	Episode: "OMG! Jayden's mom is back!"
2021–2022	The Book of Boba Fett	Fennec Shand	Main cast
2021, 2024	Star Wars: The Bad Batch	Fennec Shand (voice)	3 episodes
2022	Young Sheldon	Dr. Carol Lee	Episode: "A Free Scratcher and Feminine Wiles"
2022	Hacks	Janet Stone	2 episodes
2023–2024	Velma	Carroll (voice)	Recurring cast
2023	Gremlins: Secrets of the Mogwai	Fong Wing (voice)	Main cast
2023	Mech Cadets	Dolly Yu (voice)	Main cast
2023	Blue Eye Samurai	Madame Kaji (voice)	Recurring cast
2024–2025	Tomb Raider: The Legend of Lara Croft	Eva Tong (voice)	2 episodes
2025	The Mighty Nein	Dairon (voice)	4 episodes
2026	American Dad!	Gwen Ling (voice)	Episode: "Aw Rats, A Pool Party"
2026	Percy Jackson and the Olympians	Hera	Guest cast (season 3)
2026	Lego Disney Princess: Magical Mayhem	Mulan (voice)	

=== Web series ===
Year	Title	Role	Notes
2015	Parallel Man: Infinite Pursuit	Major Mackenzie Cartwright	Voice, short film
2015	Agents of S.H.I.E.L.D.: Double Agent	Herself	"Infiltrating the Set"
2016	Agents of S.H.I.E.L.D.: Academy	Herself	Episodes: "Skydive Challenge", "Commencement"
2016	Agents of S.H.I.E.L.D.: Slingshot	Agent Melinda May	2 episodes
2020	50 States of Fright	Susan	Episode: "Ball of Twine"

=== Video games ===
Year	Title	Voice role	Notes/Ref.
1995	Street Fighter: The Movie	Chun-Li	
1999	Disney's Story Studio: Mulan	Mulan	
2006	Kingdom Hearts II	Mulan	
2015	Disney Infinity 3.0	Mulan	
2016	Lego Marvel's Avengers	Agent Melinda May	
2016	Disney Magic Kingdoms	Mulan	
2023	Disney Speedstorm	Mulan	
2024	Disney Dreamlight Valley	Mulan	

== Awards and nominations ==
Year	Award	Category	Work	Result
1998	Annie Award	Outstanding Achievement in Voice Acting, Female	Mulan	Won
1999	Online Film & Television Association Award	Best Family Actress	Mulan	Won
1999	Online Film & Television Association Award	Best Voice-Over Performer	Mulan	Nominated
2001	Screen Actors Guild Award	Outstanding Performance by an Ensemble in a Drama Series	ER	Nominated
2014	People's Choice Award	Favorite Actress in a New TV Series	Agents of S.H.I.E.L.D.	Nominated
2015	TVLine's Performer of the Week	Performance in "Melinda"	Agents of S.H.I.E.L.D.	Won
2016	Nickelodeon Kids' Choice Awards	Favorite TV Actress – Family Show	Agents of S.H.I.E.L.D.	Nominated
2019	Disney Legend	Film, Television, & Animation — Voice	Herself	Honoree
2021	1st Hollywood Critics Association TV Award	Best Supporting Actress in a Streaming Series, Drama	The Mandalorian	Nominated
2021	BBC's 100 Women	Entertainment & Sport	Herself	Honoree
2022	2nd Hollywood Critics Association TV Award	Best Supporting Actress in a Streaming Series, Drama	The Book of Boba Fett	Nominated
2022	Saturn Awards	Best Actress in a Streaming Presentation	The Book of Boba Fett	Won
2022	Hollywood Walk of Fame	Television	Herself	Honoree
2023	Carnegie Mellon University Alumni Award	Alumni Achievement Awards	Herself	Honoree
2023	Gold House	Gold Generation Award	The Joy Luck Club	Won (Note: Shared with the cast & executive producer)
