= The Persian Version =

2023 film by Maryam Keshavarz

- Theatrical release poster
- Directed by: Maryam Keshavarz
- Written by: Maryam Keshavarz
- Produced by: Anne Carey; Ben Howe; Luca Borghese; Maryam Keshavarz; Peter Block; Cory Neal
- Starring: Layla Mohammadi; Niousha Noor; Bijan Daneshmand; Bella Warda; Tom Byrne
- Cinematography: André Jäger
- Edited by: Abolfazl Talooni; JoAnne Yarrow
- Music by: Rostam Batmanglij
- Production companies: Marakesh Films; Archer Gray; AgX; A Bigger Boat
- Distributed by: Sony Pictures Classics; Stage 6 Films
- Release dates: January 21, 2023 (Sundance); October 20, 2023 (United States)
- Running time: 107 minutes
- Country: United States
- Languages: English; Persian
- Box office: $776,069

The Persian Version is a 2023 American comedy drama film directed and written by Maryam Keshavarz. The film stars Layla Mohammadi, Niousha Noor, Bijan Daneshmand, Bella Warda, and Tom Byrne. It follows the struggles of a young Iranian-American woman who is often at odds with her family, particularly with her mother.

The film had its world premiere at the Sundance Film Festival on January 21, 2023, where it won two awards, including the Audience Award for the U.S. Dramatic Competition. It had a limited theatrical release in the United States by Sony Pictures Classics and Stage 6 Films on October 20, 2023. It received positive reviews from critics and was named one of the top 10 independent films of 2023 by the National Board of Review.

== Plot ==
A young Iranian-American filmmaker named Leila has a one-night stand with Maximillian, an actor who is appearing on stage in the title role of Hedwig and the Angry Inch. She subsequently finds out that she's pregnant.

Leila's father Ali Reza has a serious medical condition that requires him to undergo a heart transplant operation. This crisis prompts a reunion of Leila's large family (she has eight brothers).

Leila clashes with her mother Shireen and spends time with her grandmother. In an extended flashback set in Iran, Shireen gets married at a young age to Ali Reza.

== Cast ==
- Layla Mohammadi as Leila
  - Chiara Stella as young Leila
- Niousha Noor as Shireen
  - Kamand Shafieisabet as young Shireen
- Bijan Daneshmand as Ali Reza
  - Shervin Alenabi as young Ali Reza
- Bella Warda as Mamanjoon
  - Sachli Gholamalizad as young Mamanjoon
- Tom Byrne as Maximillian
- Arty Froushan as Majid
- Samuel Tehrani as Shivaz
- Jerry Habibi as Abbas
- Parsa Kaffash as Vahid
- Andrew Malik as Eman
- Ash Goldeh as Babajoon

== Release ==
The Persian Version had its world premiere at the Sundance Film Festival on January 21, 2023. It received a standing ovation from the audience. Shortly after, Sony Pictures Classics acquired distribution rights to the film.

The film was for a limited theatrical release in the United States on October 20, 2023. It was previously set for October 13, before being moved a week later to avoid competition with the concert film Taylor Swift: The Eras Tour. It is scheduled to be released in the United Kingdom on February 2, 2024.

== Reception ==
On the review aggregator website Rotten Tomatoes, 84% of 80 critics' reviews are positive, with an average rating of 6.6/10. The website's consensus reads: "A vibrant portrait of culture clashes and generation gaps, The Persian Version gains added resonance through its spirited specificity." Metacritic, which uses a weighted average, assigned the film a score of 61 out of 100, based on 21 critics, indicating "generally favorable reviews".

Nick Allen of RogerEbert.com called the film "an ebullient rule-breaker" and said it was "one of the most entertaining and moving experiences I've had at Sundance this year."

=== Accolades ===
Award	Date of ceremony	Category	Recipient(s)	Result	Ref.
Sundance Film Festival	January 27, 2023	Grand Jury Prize - U.S. Dramatic Competition	The Persian Version	Nominated	
Sundance Film Festival	January 27, 2023	Audience Award - U.S. Dramatic Competition	The Persian Version	Won	
Sundance Film Festival	January 27, 2023	Waldo Salt Screenwriting Award	Maryam Keshavarz	Won	
Calgary International Film Festival	October 3, 2023	Audience Choice Award, International Narrative Feature	The Persian Version	Won	
Astra Film Awards	January 6, 2024	Best International Actress	Layla Mohammadi	Nominated	
