= Kathreen Khavari =

American actress, writer, and producer

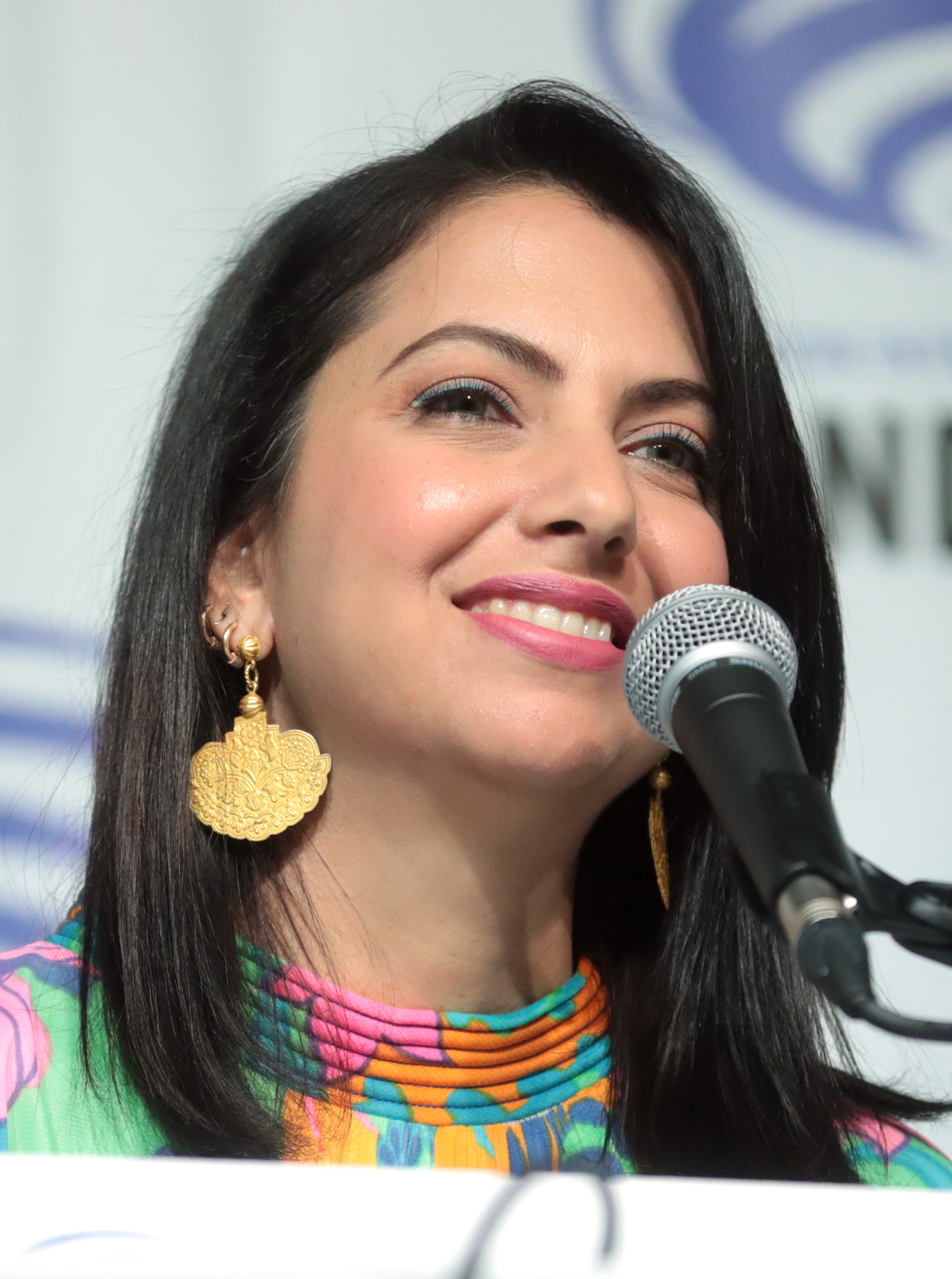
- Khavari at the 2019 WonderCon
- Born: Oakland, California, U.S.
- Occupations: Actress, writer, producer, voice actress
- Years active: 2008–present

Kathreen Aziz Khavari (Persian: کاترین خاوری;) is an American actress, writer, and producer best known for her role as Patricia on HBO's Insecure, Samantha on HBO's Big Little Lies, and for voicing Ms. Marvel in various Marvel Entertainment animated series and video games.

Khavari first gained recognition when her sketch Brain of Terror, in which she played eleven different characters, went viral after it was featured on Upworthy. Before that, her sketch Shit Oakland Says went viral, while her webseries Famous Farrah garnered attention and was later optioned to Warner Bros.

== Early life ==
Khavari was born and raised in Oakland, California to Iranian immigrant parents. After graduating from Skyline High School, she attended the University of California, Berkeley, studying public health, then later earned a Master's degree from the London School of Hygiene & Tropical Medicine in Control of Infectious Diseases.

== Career ==
Khavari realized her childhood passion of acting was unwavering, and upon returning home from London, she took small acting jobs while working in the public health field. She made her off-Broadway debut in "You Are Dead, You Are Here" at the Here Arts Center in New York.

In response to Donald Trump's "Muslim Ban", Khavari made headlines at the premier of Big Little Lies when she wore a dress that read "My Iranian Immigrant Mother Teaches Your Kids How to Read".

Khavari's satirical sketches, which she posted to her YouTube channel Brain of Terror, touched on various social justice issues including gun control, Islamophobia, women's reproductive rights, and police brutality against black men in America.

She voiced Ms. Marvel (Kamala Khan) in numerous Marvel animations, including Avengers Assemble and the Marvel Rising franchise.

Khavari and her writing partner, Chuck Neal, launched their podcast, Strongly Worded, where they do dramatic readings of strongly worded written exchanges that their guests have engaged in.

In 2022, Khavari was the voice of Badyah Hassan in the Netflix animated series Dead End: Paranormal Park. She was also announced as the voice of a new Transformers robot, Twitch, in the Nickelodeon series Transformers: EarthSpark.

Khavari's Oakland-based pilot, Embrace, debuted at the 2020 Sundance Film Festival in their Indie Episodic category. The pilot also won the Episodic Pilot Competition Jury Award at SXSW. The judges stated that it won "for its originality of voice, its depiction of characters and relationships that are both enigmatic and appealing, as well as telling an absorbing story in a world unseen on television at the moment."

Khavari was cast in Spinal Tap II: The End Continues as the band's costume designer, Yasmine Farangi, marking her fourth time working with Christopher Guest

== Filmography ==
=== Film ===
Year	Title	Role	Director
2016	Mascots	Bosphorus Cooper	Christopher Guest
2020	The Night	Elahe	Kourosh Ahari
2025	Spinal Tap II: The End Continues	Yasmine Farangi	Rob Reiner

=== Television ===
Year	Title	Role	Notes
2011	Love Bites	Young Lawyer	Episode: "Firsts"
2011	Blue Bloods	Alya Demir	Episode: "Thanksgiving"; uncredited
2013	Famous Farrah	Farrah Satrapi/"Dorian Plague"	Main role
2016–2018	Avengers Assemble	Ms. Marvel / Kamala Khan (voice)	Recurring role
2016–2018	Insecure	Patricia	Recurring role
2017	Big Little Lies	Samantha	Recurring role
2017	Ginger Snaps	Cheerleader #1 (voice)	Recurring role
2017	Be Cool, Scooby-Doo!	Zara (voice)	Episode: "Protein Titans 2"
2017–2018	Marvel Future Avengers	Ms. Marvel / Kamala Khan, Muneeba Khan (voice)	Recurring role, English dub
2018	Stretch Armstrong and the Flex Fighters	Young Riya Dashti, Riya's Aunt, Mrs. Rook (voice)	2 episodes
2018	Marvel Rising: Initiation	Ms. Marvel / Kamala Khan (voice)	Television film
2018	Marvel Rising: Secret Warriors	Ms. Marvel / Kamala Khan, Mom (voice)	Television film
2018	Marvel Rising: Chasing Ghosts	Ms. Marvel / Kamala Khan (voice)	Television film
2018	Spider-Man	Ms. Marvel / Kamala Khan, Shannon Stillwell (voice)	Recurring role
2019	Marvel Rising: Heart of Iron	Ms. Marvel / Kamala Khan (voice)	Television film
2019	Marvel Rising: Battle of the Bands	Ms. Marvel / Kamala Khan (voice)	Television film
2019	Marvel Rising: Operation Shuri	Ms. Marvel / Kamala Khan (voice)	Television film
2020	Embrace	Co-writer (with Chuck Neal) and star	Main role
2022	Dead End: Paranormal Park	Badyah (voice)	Netflix original animated series
2022	Transformers: EarthSpark	Twitch Malto, additional voices	Main role

=== Video games ===
Year	Title	Role
2018	Marvel Battle Lines	Ms. Marvel / Kamala Khan
2019	Marvel Ultimate Alliance 3: The Black Order	Ms. Marvel / Kamala Khan
2021	Destruction AllStars	Tw!nkleR10t
