= Fennec Shand =

Star Wars character

- Star Wars character
- Ming-Na Wen as Fennec Shand
- First appearance: "Chapter 5: The Gunslinger"; The Mandalorian; (2019)
- Last appearance: "Bad Territory"; Star Wars: The Bad Batch (2024)
- Created by: Jon Favreau
- Portrayed by: Ming-Na Wen
- Voiced by: Ming-Na Wen

In-universe information
- Species: Human (cyborg)
- Occupation: Assassin, bounty hunter, consigliere
- Affiliation: Fett gotra
- Partner: Boba Fett

Fennec Shand is a fictional character in the Star Wars franchise portrayed by Ming-Na Wen in the Disney+ television series The Mandalorian, The Bad Batch, and The Book of Boba Fett. An elite mercenary and assassin, she was introduced in "Chapter 5: The Gunslinger" of The Mandalorian, in which she is sought by the show's title character and another bounty hunter, Toro Calican, who seemingly kills her. "Chapter 14: The Tragedy" established that Fennec was saved by Boba Fett, leaving her in his debt, and had parts of her body replaced with cybernetics. As Fett's new partner, she helps him recover his old armor from the Mandalorian, rescue Grogu, and conquer Tatooine and the remnants of the Hutt cartels. In The Book of Boba Fett, Fennec and Fett come into conflict with various enemies attempting to seize power from them, leading them to ally with the Mandalorian once more to defend their new crime empire.

The character has been received positively by reviewers and fans alike and has been described as a fan favorite.

== Concept and creation ==
Elements of Fennec Shand's personality and development were inspired by the character's name, which Wen said brought to mind the idea of the namesake fennec fox. Anthony Breznican of Vanity Fair noted the fennec fox is a particularly appropriate model for the character because, like Fennec Shand, it is both predator and prey. Wen felt the character shared common attributes with the fox, including trickiness, stealthiness, maneuverability, and the ability to survive.

The character of Fennec Shand and the casting of Wen was first announced at the D23 Expo in Anaheim, California on August 23, 2019. Bob Iger, CEO of The Walt Disney Company, announced the news on the same day that Wen was named one of the Disney Legends for her past work in Disney works. Footage of Fennec Shand was first publicly shown in a 30-second teaser trailer for The Mandalorian released on November 4, 2019. The teaser concluded with a shot of Fennec delivering the line: "Your name will be legendary." Abbey White said the character was "eagerly anticipated" by the time The Mandalorian premiered.

=== Portrayal ===
Fennec Shand is portrayed by Ming-Na Wen. It marks one of several notable performances by Wen in Walt Disney Company projects, including voicing Mulan in the animated films Mulan (1998), Mulan II (2004) and the video game Kingdom Hearts II (2005), making a cameo appearance in the 2020 live-action remake as a court guest, and portraying Melinda May on the Marvel series Agents of S.H.I.E.L.D. Patrick Hipes of Deadline Hollywood called this a "Disney franchise trifecta". Wen has jokingly said of Disney: "Please just keep acquiring all these different franchises, because I just keep getting employed by them. I have hit every bucket list thanks to Disney."

As a child, Wen was a fan of the original Star Wars trilogy, and, as one of the few Asian girls growing up in Mt. Lebanon, Pennsylvania, she particularly related to the character Luke Skywalker and his dreams of a more meaningful life, recalling, "Just that image of him looking at the binary suns and wishing for more, it always stays with me." She has described Star Wars as her "favorite all-time genre". Wen grew up in the same town as The Mandalorian executive producer Dave Filoni, who also directed the episode in which she appears.

Fennec Shand is the first major Star Wars villain-antihero portrayed by an Asian actress. Wen said she is pleased there has been more representation of Asians among the casts of Star Wars projects in recent years, citing Kelly Marie Tran's portrayal of Rose Tico, in Star Wars: The Last Jedi (2017), as another example. She also noted that the Star Wars franchise has often been influenced by Asian cultures, both in its costuming and set design elements, despite an earlier lack of Asian actors being cast; she noted, "There was all this incredible imagery, but yet there were very few Asians in the films. Any sort of representation is important and necessary. And I'm just happy that I got chosen."

After attending the premiere of The Mandalorian on November 13, 2019, Wen posted photos from the event on Twitter and wrote: "What a night! If you told my 13 yr old self that I'd be on the red carpet celebrating being IN a @starwars project, she'd think you were nuts! Well, that little girl inside me still think it's nuts!"

=== Costume ===
Fennec Shand with her helmet, as seen in The Book of Boba Fett.

Fennec Shand's costume was created by Joseph Porro, the costume designer for The Mandalorian. A black, leather outfit of armor with broad shoulders and accents of orange, it was inspired by the fennec fox referenced in the character's name. Wen referred to it as an "amazing outfit that I fell in love with right away".

Original plans for Fennec's hair called for it to be loose and unkempt, but Wen suggested her hairstyle include some of "the fennec fox architecture", similar to the costume. She also felt the original plan was too similar to the long, flowing hair of her Melinda May character on Agents of S.H.I.E.L.D., and she wanted the two characters to be more differentiated. Wen brought these ideas to Dave Filoni and The Mandalorian creator and showrunner Jon Favreau, and they responded enthusiastically. As a result, the hairstylist on The Mandalorian conceived a braiding system with triangular points, similar to the ears of a fennec fox. The braids are pulled back tight against her head and threaded with orange, which was also influenced by the fennec fox animal. Wen said felt the hairstyle "gives her such a strong, unique look".

== Characterization ==
Fennec Shand is characterized as an elite assassin, one who is mysterious and very dangerous. She is a highly skilled fighter at both firearms and hand-to-hand combat, and displays a sharpshooter's ability with a sniper rifle. She is very graceful and agile, and stealthy, demonstrating an ability to maneuver and survive. Ming-Na Wen, the actress who portrays Fennec, felt the character has a moral ambiguity similar to that of popular Star Wars character Han Solo. She is also very tricky, playing mind games with her victims, as demonstrated by her attempts to manipulate Toro Calican once captured. Anthony Breznican of Vanity Fair has noted that the character is rather talkative in this way, in contrast to the usually stoic and silent title character, the Mandalorian. Wen feels the character "has a good sense of humor about it all as well". Nevertheless, she also at times demonstrates a gruff and reserved personality. Fennec is ruthless, independent, unpredictable, and is loyal to herself first and foremost. She occasionally shows errors in judgment, such as when she almost fatally underestimates the ruthlessness of Toro Calican.

== Appearances ==
=== The Mandalorian ===
In The Mandalorian, Fennec Shand is presented as an elite mercenary and assassin who developed a significant reputation committing murders for the galaxy's top crime syndicates, including the Hutts, before their leaders were imprisoned by the New Republic. Little else about her backstory is revealed. She appears in the Mandalorian episode "Chapter 5: The Gunslinger", starting the episode in hiding on the desert planet Tatooine, because a large bounty has been placed upon her. Toro Calican, an aspiring bounty hunter, takes the bounty on Fennec as his first assignment, believing capturing such a notorious target would bring him prestige and allow him to join the Bounty Hunters' Guild. Toro recruits the show's protagonist, a bounty hunter known as "The Mandalorian", to help him find and capture her.

They track Fennec to a part of the planet known as the Dune Sea, where they discover the dead body of another bounty hunter she had previously killed. While they investigate, Fennec opens fire on them with a long-ranged blaster rifle, keeping them pinned down from a high vantage point. The Mandalorian and Toro eventually charge toward her position on speeder bikes and use flash charges to temporarily blind and distract her. After a brief fight, they incapacitate Fennec, and restrain her with handcuffs. When the Mandalorian temporarily departs to secure their transportation, Fennec informs Toro that the Mandalorian is wanted by the Bounty Hunters Guild and that capturing him would bring Toro a legendary reputation. She offers to work with Toro to subdue the Mandalorian and turn him over to Guild. Instead, Toro shoots Fennec and leaves her for dead in the desert, believing she intended to eventually kill him. In a later scene, an unidentified person approaches Fennec's body.

Shand returns in the second-season episode "Chapter 14: The Tragedy", in which it is revealed that she was rescued by Boba Fett, who nursed her back to health using cybernetics and recruited her as his partner. She accompanies Fett to Tython, where they attempt to recover the latter's old armor from the Mandalorian, and ensure the safety of Grogu, a Force-sensitive alien infant that the Mandalorian has adopted, in exchange for the armor's return. When Moff Gideon's Imperial remnant attacks the group, Fennec helps the Mandalorian and Fett fend off the stormtroopers deployed to capture Grogu, but fail to prevent him from being taken by Gideon's Dark Troopers. To repay their debt to the Mandalorian for returning Fett's armor, Fennec and Fett aid his efforts to rescue Grogu in both "Chapter 15: The Believer" and ''Chapter 16: The Rescue''. After the latter episode, after their debt has been paid off, Fennec and Fett return to Tatooine and kill Bib Fortuna, who has been in charge of Jabba the Hutt's palace since his death. Fett then sits on the throne that once belonged to Jabba, with Fennec at his side.

=== The Bad Batch ===
A younger Fennec appears in the animated series Star Wars: The Bad Batch, with Ming-Na Wen returning to voice the character. Set 28 years before The Mandalorian, Fennec is depicted as a bounty hunter who attempts to capture Omega for the bounty on her head. In the episode "Cornered", a docking official contacts her about the Bad Batch and Omega's presence on Pantora, and Fennec arrives there. After getting lost, Omega encounters Fennec, who gains her trust by offering to help her find her friends and also steals fruit for her. They eventually run into Hunter, the leader of the Bad Batch, who realizes that Fennec is a threat and tells Omega to flee. After Fennec fights Hunter and later knocks out Wrecker, she gives chase on a stolen speeder, but the Bad Batch and Omega eventually escape from Pantora. Fennec then informs her client of the escape but says that she will find Omega.

She later returns in "Bounty Lost", in which it is revealed that she was hired by Nala Se to bring her Omega, who has been kidnapped by Cad Bane. Fennec arrives at an abandoned facility on Bora Vio and kills Taun We, to whom Bane was supposed to deliver Omega. She then confronts Cad Bane. As the bounty hunters fight each other, Omega is saved by the Bad Batch and they escape again. Fennec leaves the planet, but not before sabotaging Bane's ship, leaving him stranded. Nala Se tells her that Omega is "safe" as long as she is not in the hands of Kaminoan Prime Minister Lama Su and that she will transfer Fennec her payment.

Shand returns in Season 3 episode "Bad Territory", in which she enlists Hunter and Wrecker in finding her target, Sylar Saris, in exchange for information about M-count for Hunter. After capturing the target, she tells Hunter that she will send him the information he needs. She later contacts someone about the Bad Batch and their whereabouts. In the next episode, "The Harbinger", it's revealed that Shand's contact is Asajj Ventress.

=== The Book of Boba Fett ===
Fennec appears in all episodes of The Book of Boba Fett, which premiered on December 29, 2021, with Wen reprising her role. She serves as Fett's right-hand woman following his takeover of Jabba's criminal empire and assists him with running it and eliminating any possible rivals. When Fett prepares to go to war with the Pyke Syndicate for control of Tatooine, Fennec recruits the Mandalorian to their side. She subsequently partakes in the fight against the Pykes and their allies, before assassinating the Pyke boss, as well as the mayor of Mos Espa and the leaders of the crime families who betrayed Fett.

=== Other appearances ===
On February 9, 2022, Fennec was added to Fortnite Battle Royale alongside Black Krrsantan.

== Reception ==
Fennec Shand has been received positively by reviewers and fans alike. Izak Bulten of Screen Rant wrote: "Despite appearing in just one episode, she had a clear, well-realized character and has quickly become a favorite amongst fans of the series." Men's Health writer Evan Romano said "In only a few lines, this character has already had some very impressive lore built around her". Vanity Fair writer Anthony Breznican felt the character continued a positive and significant trend of greater diversity in Star Wars casting, citing other examples of Asian actors in recent projects such as Kelly Marie Tran in The Last Jedi and Christopher Sean in Star Wars Resistance. Joanna Robinson, also of Vanity Fair, praised the character, saying she had a "coiled power in her", and complimented the casting of Wen. Jackson McHenry of Vulture praised Wen's performance, and called the character "one of the badder-ass badasses in the world of The Mandalorian". Fennec Shand was included on Vulture's list of the show's 15 best cameo appearances from season one.

Before her return in the second season, several reviewers felt the character was eliminated too quickly and did not get the chance to live up to her potential. Joanna Robinson said she would have preferred a full episode of word play between Fennec and the Mandalorian, and said of Fennec's role in the episode: "There's a real potential there, and it was over too quickly for my taste. I would've loved more of it." Dirk Libbey of CinemaBlend called the character "criminally underused", and Allie Gemmill of Inverse called her death "hasty". Breznican said, "There's way too much potential for that character to just vanish like this." Keith Phipps of Vulture wrote that she "seemed too clever to be taken out so easily by a rookie". Kerr Lordygan of TV Fanatic wrote that "Fennec's demise was too easily obtained, though the possibility of her return was left open". TV Insider's Emily Hannemann stated that she is just "plain cool" saying, "Not every character can steal a scene by sitting and drinking spotchka, but not every character is Fennec Shand." Stating that Ming-Na Wen's Fennec Shand, like Din Djarin and Grogu, has left a mark in the Star Wars franchise, Cinemablend's Erik Swann praised Fennec Shand.

Several reviewers correctly speculated that the character was still alive, with some arguing this is foreshadowed by the final scene of "Chapter 5: The Gunslinger", during which a mysterious stranger investigates her body. Allie Gemmill called that scene "one of the most tantalizing closings to a Mandalorian episode since the series premiere revealed Baby Yoda". Dirk Libbey called the mysterious character's identity and his interest in Fennec "one of our bigger cliffhanger moments" from the series. Evan Romano said he would not be surprised to see Fennec Shand turn up again in a future Star Wars film or series, writing: "This character seems just a little too capable, and a little too cool to be disarmed and killed after just a single brief appearance". Stephanie Dube Dwilson of Heavy.com said she so enjoyed Wen's acting that she hopes the character returns.
