= Marvel Rising =

American media franchise produced by Marvel Animation

- Created by: Marvel Animation
- Original work: Marvel Rising: Initiation
- Owner: The Walt Disney Company

Print publications
- Comics: Marvel Rising (2018); Marvel Rising (2019)

Films and television
- Film: Marvel Rising: Secret Warriors
- Short films: Initiation; Ultimate Comics
- Television specials: Chasing Ghosts; Heart of Iron; Battle of the Bands; Operation Shuri; Playing with Fire

Audio
- Original music: "Born Ready" "Side by Side" "Team" "Natural Disaster" "Roaring Thunder"

Miscellaneous
- Toy: Hasbro line

Marvel Rising is an American media franchise and shared universe produced by Marvel Animation. The animated media are based on characters from Marvel Comics publications and include a made-for-television film, television specials, short films, and comic books. The franchise centers on the Secret Warriors, a diverse team of teenage superheroes who join forces to fight threats together.

The Marvel Rising animated media premiered on Disney Channel and Disney XD. They were subsequently released on Disney+.

== Development ==
In May 2017, Marvel Entertainment filed several separate trademark applications for "Marvel Rising."

On December 7, 2017, Marvel Entertainment announced the creation of a new franchise, with the release of a television film and a series of shorts.

On April 25, 2018, the franchise was launched with a series of comic books, with Marvel Rising #0 released for free, with following monthly issues starting in June. On August 13, 2018, a series of six four-minute shorts, titled Marvel Rising: Initiation, were released in advance of the television film. On August 23, 2018, the theme song of Marvel Rising: Secret Warriors, "Born Ready," was released on the YouTube channel of Walt Disney Records. The film was released on Disney Channel and Disney XD on September 30, 2018. On October 2, 2018, following the premiere of Secret Warriors, Marvel announced two new Marvel Rising specials, Chasing Ghosts and Heart of Iron, for future release. In March 2019, the next short film series Marvel Rising Ultimate Comics was released, and a self titled comic book mini-series for the franchise. At the March 2019 WonderCon, Marvel announced three additional specials, Battle of the Bands, Operation Shuri, and Playing With Fire, to be streamed on Marvel HQ YouTube channel later in the year.

== Cast ==
Ref.									
Voice actor	Character	Initiation	Secret Warriors	Chasing Ghosts	Ultimate Comics	Heart of Iron	Battle of the Bands	Operation Shuri	Playing with Fire
Dee Bradley Baker	Lockjaw		Yes	Yes		Yes			Yes
Dee Bradley Baker	Tippy-Toe	Yes	Yes	Yes	Yes	Yes	Yes	Yes	Yes
Chloe Bennet	Quake / Daisy Johnson	Yes	Yes	Yes	Yes	Yes			
Grey Griffin	Betty Brant	Yes		Unvoiced			Unvoiced	Unvoiced	
Dove Cameron	Ghost-Spider / Gwen Stacy	Yes		Yes		Yes	Yes	Yes	Yes
Skai Jackson	Gloria "Glory" Grant	Yes		Yes			Yes	Yes	
Kathreen Khavari	Ms. Marvel / Kamala Khan	Yes	Yes	Yes	Yes	Yes	Yes	Yes	Yes
Daisy Lightfoot	Shuri							Yes	
Kamil McFadden	Patriot / Rayshaun Lucas	Yes	Yes	Yes	Yes	Yes	Yes		
Melanie Minichino	A.M.I.					Yes			
Amanda C. Miller	Sheath	Unvoiced		Yes					
Tyler Posey	Inferno / Dante Pertuz		Yes	Yes	Yes	Yes	Yes		Yes
Cierra Ramirez	Miss America / America Chavez		Yes	Yes	Yes	Yes	Yes	Yes	Yes
Kim Raver	Captain Marvel / Carol Danvers		Yes			Yes		Yes	
Navia Robinson	Zayla								Yes
Roger Craig Smith	Captain America		Yes	Yes	Yes				
Booboo Stewart	Exile / Victor Kohl		Yes	Yes					
Tara Strong	Mary Jane Watson	Yes		Yes			Yes	Yes	
Tara Strong	Screaming Mimi / Melissa Gold						Yes		
Milana Vayntrub	Squirrel Girl / Doreen Green	Yes	Yes	Yes	Yes	Yes	Yes	Yes	Yes
Steven Weber	Captain George Stacy	Yes		Yes			Unvoiced		
Ming-Na Wen	Hala the Accuser		Yes			Yes			
Mick Wingert	Iron Man				Yes	Yes			
Sofia Wylie	Ironheart / Riri Williams					Yes	Yes		

== Animated media ==
=== Initiation ===
A series of six four-minute shorts, titled Marvel Rising: Initiation, were released in advance of the film. The shorts focus on Ghost-Spider, who is on the run after being framed for the murder of her friend Kevin while Quake and Patriot, as well as Ms. Marvel and Squirrel Girl, attempt to bring her in. Written by Mairghread Scott, Initiation aired on August 13, 2018, on Disney XD. The episodes are grouped into three arcs: a Gwen Stacy solo, a Ms. Marvel/Squirrel Girl team-up, and a S.H.I.E.L.D. pursuit.

=== Secret Warriors ===
The main entry in the franchise, Marvel Rising: Secret Warriors, was announced alongside the franchise in December 2017. The film tells the story of how the Secret Warriors are initially drawn together following a string of Inhuman-related violence, and must work together to stop Hala the Accuser and her Kree forces.

The movie was first announced on December 7, 2017, and aired on September 30, 2018. Joe Quesada, Dan Buckley, Cort Lane, and Eric Radomski executive produce the film, with Stan Lee, Sana Amanat, and Marsha Griffin credited as co-executive producers. It was written by Mairghread Scott, with Alfred Gimeno as supervising director.

=== Specials ===
The first two specials Chasing Ghosts and Heart of Iron were announced by Marvel on October 2, 2018, following the premiere of Secret Warriors; these specials revolve around the Secret Warriors settling unfinished business with their enemies from the film.

The next three specials, Battle of the Bands, Operation Shuri, and Playing With Fire, were later announced at the March 2019 WonderCon. These specials introduced new villains to the series.

As of 2023, no new specials are set to be released, with Playing with Fire being the last one.

1. Marvel Rising: Chasing Ghosts is a 22-minute special written by Mairghread Scott. It was released on January 16, 2019 on the Marvel HQ YouTube channel, and later on February 1 on the DisneyNOW app. It continues Ghost-Spider's story from the Initiation shorts, in which she joins forces with the Secret Warriors to stop Exile and Sheath (who previously made an unvoiced appearance in Initiation), during which Quake helps Ghost-Spider clear her name for Kevin's death.
2. Marvel Rising: Heart of Iron is a 44-minute special written by Margaret Dunlap. It was released on the Marvel HQ YouTube channel on April 3, 2019. It introduces the character Ironheart, who is having difficulty adjusting to her new college life as the youngest student there. When Hala the Accuser demolishes the college's engineering lab and kidnaps Riri's best friend, the artificial intelligence A.M.I., Riri takes inspiration from Iron Man and develops a plan with help from the Secret Warriors to save her friend.
3. Marvel Rising: Battle of the Bands is a 22-minute special written by Mae Catt. It premiered on August 23, 2019 at D23 Expo, and was later released on the Marvel HQ YouTube channel on August 28, 2019. It features Ghost-Spider assisting the Secret Warriors looking into mysterious attacks involving the sonic-powered Screaming Mimi. However, the investigation may keep Gwen from her band's competition.
4. Marvel Rising: Operation Shuri is a 22-minute special also written by Mae Catt. It premiered on October 6, 2019 at New York Comic Con, and was later released on the Marvel HQ YouTube channel on October 11, 2019. It introduces Black Panther's younger sister Shuri, who attempts to hang out with the Secret Warriors as a normal teen.
5. Marvel Rising: Playing with Fire is a 44-minute special written by Danielle Wolff. It was released on the Marvel HQ YouTube channel on December 18, 2019. It focuses on Inferno, whose powers get stolen by a teenage criminal named Zayla, and America Chavez, who attempts to connect with Ms. Marvel. The Secret Warriors attempt to get Inferno's powers back while Inferno is conflicted as to whether he actually wants his powers back.

=== Ultimate Comics ===
Announced in February 2019, a series of six animated videos titled Marvel Rising Ultimate Comics, were released on the Marvel HQ YouTube channel from February 20, 2019 to March 27, 2019. The shorts are between six and seven minutes long and were released weekly. The videos combine comic book-style art with digital motion effects. The first is subtitled and features Ms. Marvel going up against Loki when he interrupted her field trip.

== Reception ==
=== Critical response ===
==== Marvel Rising franchise ====
Jeremy Dickson of KidScreen described Marvel Rising as a "popular" franchise, noting that its release led to a new toy line resulting from a recent agreement between Hasbro, Marvel, and Disney. Rebecca Jane Stokes of Fatherly described Marvel Rising as a standout superhero franchise for young women. She noted that it centers on diverse female protagonists who navigate both super-powered challenges and typical adolescent issues. Stokes praised the franchise's multi-part format—including a film, webisodes, and television specials—for offering a rich, interconnected viewing experience. She also highlighted its humor, relatability, and emphasis on female empowerment, calling it a refreshing alternative to the male-dominated superhero media landscape. Chris Sims of Looper stated that Marvel Rising distinguishes itself from typical television shows, highlighting its focus on newer characters such as Ms. Marvel, Squirrel Girl, and America Chavez for a fresh perspective. He praised the series' adventurous tone, which ranges from high school heroics to cosmic escapades, blending humor and heart. Sims described the franchise as "refreshing," recommending it for viewers interested in a Marvel narrative centered on a new generation of heroes. Dave Trumbore of Collider included the Marvel Rising franchise in their list of "2018's Best New Animated Series for Kids." Jamie Lovett of ComicBook.com featured the franchise in their "10 Marvel Animated Series You Need to Binge on Disney+" list. Ethan Anderson of GameStop ranked Marvel Rising 15th in their "18 Best Non-MCU Marvel Movies and TV Shows on Disney Plus" list.

==== Marvel Rising: Initiation ====
The review aggregator website Rotten Tomatoes reported an approval rating of 83%, with an average rating of 7.0/10, based on 6 reviews.

Meagan Damore of Comic Book Resources called Marvel Rising: Initiation "full of charm and spunk," writing, "Marvel Rising: Initiation is a fun, approachable series filled with characters that will make viewers instantly fall in love. Existing fans will find a lot to like here, but even those unfamiliar with these characters will have no problem immersing themselves in this world. Like Cameron said in an earlier interview with CBR, the animated series truly has something for everybody. Marvel Rising: Initiation is a must for Marvel fans." Kevin Yeoman of Screen Rant described "Marvel Rising: Initiation as a "series of episodic shorts with an emphasis on inclusivity," stating, "Initiation lives up to its title, offering an entertaining beginning to a much larger story, one that puts a welcome emphasis on themes of inclusion and empowerment for a younger audience. But, like with Marvel's other animated offerings, there's still plenty for older viewers to enjoy as well. From the action-heavy storytelling to the obvious connection with the larger (animated) MCU, Marvel Rising: Initiation has a little something for everyone, from the hardcore Marvel-ites to those in search of heroes they can relate to."

Paige S. Allen of IGN gave Marvel Rising: Initiation a grade of 8 out of 10, stating, "Marvel Rising: Initiation shines as a promising introduction to Marvel's next class of superheroes, which is made up by richly-characterized female leads. While some viewers might lament the series' watered-down adaptation of its source material, or find that other shows have better mastered its themes, overall Marvel Rising: Initiation has enough enjoyable material to keep new and seasoned fans alike interested in the forthcoming Marvel Rising universe." Emily Ashby of Common Sense Media gave Marvel Rising: Initiation a grade of 4 out of 5 stars, complimented the depiction of positive messages and role models, citing diversity, thoughtfulness, and cleverness, asserting, " Most of the heroes introduced in this story are females, and the diversity that's evident in their personalities and physical appearances challenges the concept that TV superheroes must look and sound alike (i.e., be thin and shapely and fight crime in skimpy outfits)."

==== Marvel Rising: Secret Warriors ====
The review aggregator website Rotten Tomatoes reported an approval rating of 100%, with an average rating of 7.5/10, based on 7 reviews.

Chelsea Steiner of The Mary Sue stated Marvel Rising: Secret Warriors is an entertaining and warm-hearted animated film that celebrates diversity and inclusion. She found the story of Kamala Khan and Doreen Green learning to master their powers refreshingly original, especially with its focus on female superheroes and a woman of color in the lead. Steiner appreciated the central friendship between the two female characters, noting how Khan's hesitancy contrasts with Green's upbeat optimism to create a touching portrait of sisterhood. She complimented the film's willingness to tackle mature themes, using discrimination against inhumans as a metaphor for prejudice, and highlighted its positive message about found family and female empowerment. Emily Ashby of Common Sense Media gave Marvel Rising: Secret Warriors a grade of 4 out of 5 stars, describing it as an exciting animated origin story full of action and positive messages. She found that while the film features plenty of hand-to-hand fights, weapons, and explosions, the violence is mild and consequence-free, making it safe for younger viewers. Ashby appreciated the strong themes of teamwork, self-identity, confidence, and embracing one's uniqueness, highlighting how the teen heroes grow from insecure individuals into a united team. She praised Ms. Marvel's emergence as a compassionate leader, America Chavez's inspiring resilience after personal loss, and Daisy Johnson's moral integrity. Ashby also valued the film's emphasis on female heroes who defy traditional body types and showcase ethnic and LGBTQ+ diversity.

Megan Damore of Comic Book Resources said that Marvel Rising: Secret Warriors delivers a heartfelt and hopeful animated adventure aimed at younger viewers but enjoyable for all ages. She found the film sincere in its themes of acceptance and praised the way it balances a large cast, weaving strong personalities into dynamic relationships without forcing conflicts or introductions. Damore appreciated the standout debut of America Chavez, noting her lively visual design and welcome LGBTQ representation, and highlighted Ming-Na Wen's energetic performance as the villain Hala the Accuser. She praised the vibrant characters, talented voice cast, and uplifting story, while finding the animation less detailed than the preceding Initiation shorts, with bland settings and occasional inconsistencies in character design.Kevin Yeoman of Screen Rant stated that Marvel Rising: Secret Warriors successfully introduces a new wave of diverse Marvel heroes while keeping the story light and accessible. He found the film simple but nimble in balancing team-building action with more personal, human interactions, praising its focus on Kamala Khan as a smart, relatable teen hero. Yeoman appreciated the dynamic between Ms. Marvel and Squirrel Girl, as well as the inclusion of characters like America Chavez and Quake, which broadens representation in Marvel animation. He praised the film's ability to tell a larger adventure within an 80-minute runtime, even if some character backstories felt underdeveloped.

Victor Garett of MovieWeb described Marvel Rising: Secret Warriors as a standout animated superhero film outside the DC universe. He highlighted the film's emphasis on friendship, teamwork, and the responsible use of powers, and praised its focus on diversity and representation, noting that the characters' varied backgrounds and abilities enhance both the narrative and its themes. Joe Garza of Slashfilm asserted that Marvel Rising: Secret Warriors is a wholesome and engaging animated film for younger viewers. He found that it effectively spotlights lesser-known Marvel characters like Kamala Khan, Squirrel Girl, America Chavez, and Patriot, alongside appearances from heroes such as Captain Marvel, Captain America, and Quake. Garza appreciated how the film balances teen superhero struggles with aspirational heroism and its focus on friendship and teamwork. He complimented the way it offers entertainment for both children and older Marvel fans, making the story accessible while still fun for longtime followers of the franchise.

==== Comic books ====
Diamond Comic Distributors reported that Marvel Rising Alpha #1 was the 102nd best-selling comic book of June 2018. Marvel Rising: Squirrel Girl/Ms. Marvel #1 ranked 112th in July 2018. The trade paperback Marvel Rising graphic novel was the 13th best-selling graphic novel in November 2018. Marvel Rising #1 was the 125th best-selling comic book of March 2019.

=== Ratings ===
As of March, 2019, Marvel Rising: Initiation had been viewed over two million times on YouTube, while Marvel Rising: Secret Warriors had reached 2.9 million views. By April 2019, Marvel Rising: Chasing Ghosts had nearly 1.5 million views, and Marvel Rising: Heart of Iron, which had debuted the previous week, had accumulated 480,000 views.

=== Accolades ===
Year	Award	Category	Nominee(s)	Result	Ref.
2019	A2CAF 's Kids' Comics Awards	Most Epic Adventure	Marvel Rising: Heroes of the Round Table!	Nominated	
2019	GGN Awards	Great Graphic Novels for Teens	Marvel Rising TPB #1	Nominated	
2020	TOTY Awards	Doll of the Year	Marvel Rising: Secret Warriors	Nominated	

== In other media ==
=== Comics ===
- A comic book title for the franchise was launched for free, with the release of Marvel Rising #0 on April 25, 2018, by writer Devin Grayson and artist Marco Failla, featuring the first team up of Squirrel Girl and Ms. Marvel.
- Regular issues began in June and were written by Devin Grayson, G. Willow Wilson and Ryan North. Each issue had a different subtitle, all numbered issue 1, with Marvel Rising: Alpha #1 on June 13, 2018, Marvel Rising: Squirrel Girl/Ms. Marvel #1 on July 4, 2018, Marvel Rising: Ms. Marvel/Squirrel Girl #1 on August 1, 2018, and the last issue Marvel Rising: Omega #1 on September 12, 2018. The series was collected into a single 168-page graphic novel, simply titled Marvel Rising, which was released on November 7, 2018.
- A Marvel Rising five issue mini-series was released starting on March 27, 2019. The series has the heroes facing off with sorceress Morgan le Fay, who is attempting to turn New Jersey into New Camelot. Creative crew was writer Nilah Magruder, artist Roberto Di Salvo, and Audrey Mok on cover art.

=== Music ===
- "Born Ready," the theme song for Marvel Rising: Secret Warriors, was released on August 23, 2018, on DisneyMusicVEVO VEVO YouTube channel. The song is sung by Dove Cameron, who plays Ghost-Spider in other Marvel Rising media.
- "Side by Side," a song from Marvel Rising: Chasing Ghosts, was released on January 18, 2019, two days after the special, on DisneyMusicVEVO YouTube channel. The song is sung by Sofia Wylie, who plays Ironheart in other Marvel Rising media.
- "Team," a song from Marvel Rising: Heart of Iron, was released on May 2, 2019, on DisneyMusicVEVO. The song is sung by Tova.
- "Natural Disaster," a song from Marvel Rising: Battle of the Bands, was released on October 3, 2019. This song is also sung by Tova.
- "Roaring Thunder," a song from Marvel Rising: Playing with Fire, was released on December 19, 2019. This song is sung by Navia Robinson, who plays Zayla in the same special.

=== Merchandise ===
- In September 2018, Hasbro unveiled its Marvel Rising toy line. It consists of three varieties of figures and the Ghost-Spider Web Slinger. All were released in October 2019. One variety is the Training Outfit Doll line of 11-inch five points articulation figures in training outfits at the lowest price point. Another variety is the main line with 11-inch 15 points articulation figures in superhero costumes at a mid price point. The Secret Identity Doll are 11-inch 11 points articulation figures with two outfits at the highest price point.
- In September 2018, Marvel Entertainment released a line of Halloween costumes based on the Marvel Rising franchise, including outfits for Ms. Marvel, Squirrel Girl, and Ghost-Spider.

=== Miscellaneous ===
- In August 2018, Marvel Comics, in partnership with the nonprofit organization Young Storytellers, announced a live event in which students aged 11 to 13 would collaborate with mentors to create three- to five-page scripts featuring Marvel Rising characters. The scripts were to be performed by the franchise's voice actors and released on Marvel's YouTube channel during the third quarter of the year.
- In October 2018, Marvel Avengers Academy released a limited-time Marvel Rising event to celebrate the launch of Marvel Rising: Secret Warriors.
