= Hala the Accuser =

- Hala as depicted in Guardians of the Galaxy (vol. 4) #3 (December 2015). Art by Valerio Schiti (penciler/inker) and Richard Isanove (colorist).

Publication information
- Publisher: Marvel Comics
- First appearance: Guardians of Knowhere #3 (October 2015)
- Created by: Brian Michael Bendis; Valerio Schiti

In-story information
- Species: Kree
- Place of origin: Hala
- Team affiliations: Kree Empire
- Abilities: Superhuman strength, speed and reflexes

Hala the Accuser is a supervillain appearing in American comic books published by Marvel Comics. She first appeared in Guardians of Knowhere #3 and was created by Brian Michael Bendis and Valerio Schiti. She is a member of the Kree Accuser Corps.

== Publication history ==
Hala the Accuser first appeared in Guardians of Knowhere #3 and was created by Brian Michael Bendis and Valerio Schiti.

== Fictional character biography ==
Hala the Accuser is a member of the Kree Empire's Accuser Corps. She is the last of the Accusers after the Kree's home planet, also named Hala, was destroyed in The Black Vortex storyline.

During the Secret Wars storyline, Hala the Accuser ends up on Knowhere, which has been orbiting Battleworld following the final incursion. As Hala only speaks the Kree language, Gamora and the version of Angela who worked for the Thor Corps have a hard time dealing with her when she attacks them. Hala kills Angela and many members of the Nova Corps residing on Knowhere. Hala is defeated by Gamora with the help of Drax the Destroyer and Rocket Raccoon.

Following the restoration of the multiverse, Hala goes after Gamora and finds her on Spartax. The Thing knocks Hala unconscious, but Drax unknowingly activates a failsafe in Hala's Universal Weapon that enables her to regain consciousness and gain the upper hand against the Guardians of the Galaxy. Hala places Emperor Peter Quill in an escape pod, intending to have him watch her destroy Spartax and Earth. The Guardians rescue Quill and defeat Hala, who is deported to the remnants of the Kree empire.

== Powers and abilities ==
As a Kree warrior in peak physical condition, Hala the Accuser possesses her species' unique physiology, having far greater natural attributes than a human. Thus, Hala's body is resistant to poisons, toxins and diseases.

== In other media ==
- Hala the Accuser appears in the Marvel Rising franchise, voiced by Ming-Na Wen.
- Hala the Accuser appears in Guardians of the Galaxy: The Telltale Series, voiced by Faye Kingslee. This version seeks to use the Eternity Forge to resurrect the Kree after Thanos killed most of them. Depending on the player's choices, she can succeed in her goal, gain the Forge's power after its destruction, be killed after losing the Forge's power, or be imprisoned by the Nova Corps.
