= Parallel (2024 film) =

Film by Kourosh Ahari

- Theatrical release poster
- Directed by: Kourosh Ahari
- Written by: Edwin Hodge; Aldis Hodge; Jonathan Keasey
- Based on: Parallel Forest by Lei Zheng
- Produced by: Sean Lydiard; Jaylen Moore; Edwin Hodge; Aldis Hodge; Jonathan Keasey; Elliot Michael Smith; Wenquizi Zhang
- Starring: Danielle Deadwyler; Aldis Hodge; Edwin Hodge
- Cinematography: Pip White
- Edited by: Rob Bonz; Alex Gurvits
- Music by: Josh Atchley; Denise Santos
- Production companies: Rumble Riot; Hodge Brothers Productions; Fremont Films; Mammoth Pictures
- Distributed by: Vertical
- Release date: February 23, 2024
- Running time: 88 minutes
- Country: United States
- Language: English

Parallel is a 2024 American science fiction thriller film directed by Kourosh Ahari and written by the brothers Aldis and Edwin Hodge with Jonathan Keasey. Besides the Hodges, the film also stars Danielle Deadwyler as a grief-stricken woman who mysteriously finds herself navigating between alternate dimensions. It is a remake of the 2019 Chinese film Parallel Forest by Lei Zheng.

== Plot ==
In a house in the woods, Vanessa is looking through the window when suddenly she is startled by a bird hitting the glass. Vanessa goes out to look at the dead bird and her husband Alex joins her, trying to hold her hand to comfort her. Vanessa walks away from him.

Later Vanessa tells Alex and his brother Martel that last night she heard a loud noise that sounded like an explosion coming out of the forest. Martel talks about a facility in the forest which was rumored to have weird experiments happening inside. People previously went missing, thus the facility shutting down and now the forest is supposed to be claimed as a preservation.

However, Alex thinks it was a story made up by their dad who abandoned them. Martel thinks their dad was searching for something but Alex dismisses the idea.

Then Vanessa decides she needs time alone and prepares for a walk in the forest. Martel gives her a rifle to fight any wild animals and casually asks if the couple has decided to sell the house yet. Alex replies that they are still thinking about it but Vanessa is against it which triggers an argument that makes Vanessa leave in a huff. Alex follows her and explains to her his brother is just trying to help them move on, only Vanessa asks Alex he wishes she had died.

While walking in the forest, Vanessa sits down on a log to rest. A bird quickly flies past as Vanessa hears a noise in the forest. Someone fires a shot at her she hides behind a tree. Vanessa fires back and when she looks through her scope, she sees what appears to be herself hide behind another tree.

== Cast ==
- Danielle Deadwyler as Vanessa
- Aldis Hodge as Alex
- Edwin Hodge as Martel

== Production ==
In May 2021, it was reported that Aldis Hodge and his brother Edwin Hodge would write and star in a remake of the 2019 Chinese film Parallel Forest, with Kourosh Ahari set to direct. In June 2022, Danielle Deadwyler signed on to star and to act as the film's executive producer.

Principal photography began in Vancouver later in June 2022.

== Release ==
In April 2023, Vertical Entertainment acquired the film's worldwide distribution rights.

Parallel was released in the United States on February 23, 2024.

== Reception ==
Rachel Leishman from The Mary Sue gave the film a positive review writing: "While the plot of Parallel can get complicated if you think too deeply about it, the film (written by Hodge and his brother and co-star Edwin Hodge alongside Jonathan Keasey) shines in the performances that Deadwyler and Aldis and Edwin Hodge bring to this family. Kourosh Ahari’s simple direction lets us focus on what we want to believe in Vanessa’s quest to make it back to her original timeline."
