= Maryam Keshavarz =

Iranian-American filmmaker (born 1975)

- مریم کشاورز
- Born: 1975 (age 50–51); New York City, New York, United States
- Education: Tisch School of the Arts (MFA); University of Michigan (MA); Northwestern University (BA)
- Occupations: Film director, screenwriter

Maryam Keshavarz (Persian: مریم کشاورز; born 1975), is an American filmmaker of Iranian descent. She is best known for her 2011 film Circumstance distributed by Participant Media and Roadside Attractions, which won the Audience Award at Sundance Film Festival.

== Early life and education ==
Maryam Keshavarz was born in 1975 in New York City, New York.

Keshavarz received her BA degree in comparative literature from Northwestern University; an MA degree in Near Eastern Studies from the University of Michigan, Ann Arbor; and an MFA degree in film direction from New York University, Tisch School of the Arts.

She was also a visiting scholar at the University of Shiraz, in the department of language and literature.

== Career ==
In 2001, with a band of all girl crew and cast, Keshavarz directed her first experimental 16mm film, entitled Sanctuary. This surreal fantasy film about an Iranian woman in post-9/11 America traveled to several international festivals and landed her the Steve Tisch fellowship to attend NYU's graduate film program.

In 2003, Keshavarz drew on her experience growing up between Iran and the United States to direct her first feature documentary, The Color of Love. An intimate portrait of the changing landscape of love and politics in Iran, the documentary showed at international festivals such as Montreal World Film Fest, Full Frame Doc Fest, MoMA New York, It's All True (Brazil), among others; it garnered top prizes such as the International Documentary Association's David L. Wolper Award, Jury Award at DocuDays, and the Full Frame's Spectrum Award. The Color of Love has been broadcast internationally, was released on DVD by Parlour Pictures, and was featured on Danny DeVito's Jersey Docs, a subsidiary of Morgan Freeman's ClickStar.

In 2005, Keshavarz returned to Argentina, where she had studied Latin American literature at the University of Buenos Aires. There, she wrote and directed the visual essay The Day I Died about an adolescent love triangle in a sleepy Argentine seaside town. The Day I Died has been shown in Main Competition at Mar del Plata, Clermont-Ferrand, New York Film Festival and Berlin International Film Festival. The Day I Died was the only short film at Berlinale to win two awards: the Gold Teddy Best Short Film and the Jury Prize Special Mention. The film also won the Jury Prize at the Rio International Film Fest. The film is part of the DVD compilation by Shooting People entitled BEST v BEST VOL. 2: AWARD WINNING SHORT FILMS 2006.

Keshavarz's first narrative feature fiction film, Circumstance (2011), premiered to overwhelming critical acclaim at the 2011 Sundance Film Festival, garnering the Sundance Audience Award, leading to Keshavarz's inclusion in Deadline.com's 2011 "Director's to Watch". Circumstance has won over a dozen international awards including Best First Film at the Rome Film Festival and the Audience & Best Actress Awards at Outfest. The Independent Spirit Award nominated film was described by the New York Times as "Swirling and sensuous", by the Wall Street Journal as "Supremely cinematic", and by the Hollywood Reporter as "Amazingly accomplished." The film released theatrically in over a dozen countries in 2012.

Keshavarz's newest film project The Last Harem won the prestigious Hearst Screenwriters Grant and the San Francisco Film Society/ KRF Screenwriting Award, while her museum installation work entitled BETWEEN SIGHT AND DESIRE: IMAGINING THE MUSLIM WOMAN won a multi-year grant from Creative Capital. Maryam has also been tapped to co-write and direct the narrative adaptation of the award-winning HBO documentary Hot Coffee.

Keshavarz is an alumna of the Sundance Screenwriters and Directors Lab, Tribeca Film Institute's All Access Program. She is the recipient of dozens of grants and fellowships including the French government's Fonds Sud, Rotterdam Film Festivals' Hubert Bals Award, Women in Film's Grant, Adrienne Shelly Award, numerous Sundance fellowships, and multiple San Francisco Film Society grants. She has been a visiting artist at the University of Pennsylvania and guest lecturer at dozens of prestigious international universities. She is an active member of Film Independent serving as a mentor for their Project Involve Initiative and speaking on numerous filmmaking panels.

== Personal life ==
Keshavarz is bisexual.

== Filmography and awards ==
Year	Film	Awards	Notes
2003	The Color of Love (رنگ عشق)	International Documentary Association – David L. Wolper Award; Full Frame Documentary Film Festival – Spectrum Award	
2006	Not for Sale		
2006	The Day I Died ("El día que morí")	Berlin International Film Festival – Gold Teddy Best Short Film & Jury Prize Special Mention Rio International Film Festival – Jury Award	
2011	Circumstance	2011 Sundance Film Festival – Audience Award 2011 Noor Iranian Film Festival – Audience Favorite Award 2011 Noor Iranian Film Festival – Best Director 2011 Outfest – Audience Award 2011 Paris Lesbian and Feminist Film Festival – Best Feature Film 2011 Rome International Film Festival – Best First Film 2011 New Directors/New Films Festival – Closing Night Film 2012 Film Independent Spirit Awards – John Cassavetes Award Nominee	
2018	Viper Club		
2023	The Persian Version	2023 Sundance Film Festival – Audience Award	

== See also ==
- Cinema of Iran
- List of famous Persian women
