= The Night (2020 film) =

2020 film by Kourosh Ahari

- Theatrical release poster
- آن شب
- Directed by: Kourosh Ahari
- Written by: Milad Jarmooz; Kourosh Ahari
- Produced by: Alex Bretow; Kourosh Ahari; Jeffrey Allard; Cheryl Staurulakis; Armin Amiri
- Starring: Shahab Hosseini; Niousha Noor; Leah Oganyan; George Maguire
- Cinematography: Maz Makhani
- Edited by: Kourosh Ahari
- Music by: Nima Fakhrara
- Production companies: Mammoth Pictures; 7Skies Entertainment; Indie Entertainment; Orama Filmworks; Leveller Media; Supernova8 Films
- Distributed by: IFC Midnight (United States); Mammoth Pictures; Ayat Film Company (Iran)
- Release dates: January 20, 2020 (SBIFF); January 29, 2021 (United States); February 24, 2021 (Iran)
- Running time: 105 minutes
- Countries: Iran; United States
- Languages: Persian; English
- Box office: $44,041

The Night (Persian: آن شب, lit. 'That Night') is a 2020 psychological horror-thriller film directed by Kourosh Ahari in his directorial debut. It is a co-production between Iran and the United States, starring Shahab Hosseini, Niousha Noor, Leah Oganyan, and George Maguire. The film centers on an Iranian couple living in the United States, who are imprisoned in a Los Angeles hotel.

The film had its world premiere at the Santa Barbara International Film Festival on January 20, 2020. It was released in the United States on January 29, 2021, by IFC Midnight, and in Iran on February 24, 2021, by Mammoth Pictures and Ayat Film Company. It received positive reviews from critics.

== Plot ==
Babak Naderi and his wife Neda, an Iranian couple living in the United States with their one-year-old daughter Shabnam, are driving home after visiting some friends. However, the car's navigation system starts malfunctioning, and they end up getting lost. After driving around for a couple of hours, they decide to spend the night at the Hotel Normandie. Babak almost gets into a physical altercation with a homeless elderly man while entering the hotel, but the man vanishes after Babak and Neda check into the hotel. The receptionist informs them that only one suite is available, and that the hotel doors are locked at night.

Babak and Neda begin to notice strange events during their stay at the hotel. Neda is woken by Shabnam, and someone knocks on the room door, saying "Mommy". Upon checking the hallway, Neda sees a small child, who disappears after going down a hallway.

Babak is also woken by Shabnam, and prepares a bottle of milk with the help of the hotel receptionist, who tells him about the various tragic events he has witnessed. Babak sees the homeless man again outside the hotel, and sees the reflection of a strange woman next to him. When he turns around, he is confronted by Neda, who tells him to go to sleep and that she will bring Shabnam up to their hotel room. However, he later finds Shabnam still on the ground floor, and Neda tells him that she was asleep.

Later, Babak is startled upon seeing the woman from earlier standing in front of him. After Babak and Neda hear thumping noises above them, Babak goes up to the hotel roof, but does not find anyone. He calls the police, saying that someone is harassing them.

A police officer arrives, but he is skeptical of the couple's claims of people disturbing them, and asks Babak if there is something he is not telling him. There is a knock on the room door, and Babak finds the same police officer there when answering the door. The incident unnerves the couple so much that they decide to leave the hotel. However, Babak forgets the car keys, and he returns to the hotel room to get them while Neda waits near the car.

While waiting near the car, Neda is confronted by the homeless man, who tells her in Persian, "They hear the truth, morning comes." Babak gives the keys to Neda from the room. As Neda waits for Babak in the car with Shabnam, the child from earlier asks her to let him play with his sister.

Meanwhile, Babak finds a dead woman in the room's bathtub after noticing a wedding ring on the floor, and gets to an elevator. The elevator is briefly jammed while Babak is still inside, and the woman from earlier asks if he remembers. Neda returns to the hotel and Babak lets her in after getting out of the elevator, but he finds that he is unable to unlock the hotel doors from the receptionist's desk. The power then goes out. Babak tries to signal passersby for help, but the only people outside the hotel are the child and the woman seen earlier.

In their room, Babak calls his friend Farhad to get help, but Farhad tells him that "there is no way out". Neda is then confronted by the child, who asks her why she hasn't told Babak what she did, and repeatedly demands that she "say it". Neda breaks down in tears and confesses to Babak that she realized she was pregnant five years earlier while Babak was away from home, and that she aborted the child because she didn't want to have a child without a father. The hotel's power is then restored.

Babak tries to unlock the hotel doors again, but is unsuccessful. Neda demands to know his secret; she has realized that the power came back on because she revealed her secret, and that Babak must divulge his secret as well if they are to leave the hotel. Babak refuses to do so, and he heads deeper into the hotel to find another way out.

While searching for a way out, Babak is confronted by the woman, whose name is Sophia, and it is revealed that he cheated on Neda with her, and lied that he would leave Neda to be with her. In a panic, he ends up stabbing Neda in the stomach by accident. While looking for Shabnam, Babak gets transported to a hospital, where he finds Sophia's body in the morgue. He stabs himself at his arm's tattoo with a scalpel, and heads towards the exit, which leads into a forest, in search of Shabnam.

Babak then wakes up in the hotel room at around 3 am, and finds Neda and Shabnam sleeping peacefully next to him. He goes to the bathroom and sees that his reflection in the mirror is acting independently of him; the reflection turns around so that its back is facing him, reproducing a hotel painting seen earlier in the film. As Babak looks at his reflection, a tear falls from his eye.

== Cast ==
- Shahab Hosseini as Babak Naderi
- Niousha Noor as Neda
- Gia Mora as Sara
- Elester Latham as displaced man
- Kathreen Khavari as Elahe
- George Maguire as hotel receptionist
- Cara Fuqua as dark figure
- Armin Mehr
- Steph Martinez as Sofia
- Leah Oganyan as Shabnam
- Michael Graham as police officer
- Alain Ali Washnevsky as Mohsen
- Amir Ali Hosseini as 5-Year-Old Boy
- Lily V.K. as Sofia (voice)

== Production ==
The film is a co-production between Iran and the United States. The film was shot at the Hotel Normandie, a Wilshire district boutique hotel that was built in 1926.

== Release ==
The film had its world premiere at the Santa Barbara International Film Festival on January 20, 2020. It was released in theaters and via video on demand in the United States on January 29, 2021, by IFC Midnight. The film was released in Iran on February 24, 2021, by Mammoth Pictures and Ayat Film Company; it is the first American-made film to receive permission for theatrical release in Iran since the Iranian Revolution in 1979. The film received permission for release in Iran prior to the Trump administration's new sanctions on Iran in late 2018.

== Reception ==
=== Box office ===
The Night grossed $26,114 in North America and $17,927 in other territories for a total worldwide gross of $44,041.

=== Critical response ===
The film received positive reviews from critics. On review aggregator Rotten Tomatoes, the film has an approval rating of 79% based on 62 reviews, with an average rating of 6.9/10. The site's critics' consensus reads, "The dramatic heft and dread of The Night delivers haunting supernatural frights – and an impressive feature directorial debut for Kourosh Ahari." On Metacritic, the film holds an aggregated score of 68 out of 100 based on 10 reviews, indicating "generally favorable" reviews.

Peter Bradshaw of The Guardian gave the film a score of 4 stars out of 5, writing: "there's nothing obviously new about The Night. But it is put together with great style, force and visual imagination, and Ahari deftly uses the couple's baby to ratchet up the tension." Richard Roeper, writing for the Chicago Sun-Times, gave the film a score of 3 stars out of 4. He noted some similarities the film had with The Shining, and wrote: "Although director Kourosh Ahari is never reluctant to embrace standard-issue horror movie elements ... "The Night" has an aura of almost beautiful stillness, interspersed with moments of shock."

Carlos Aguilar, writing for the Los Angeles Times, described the film as "consistently terrifying", and noted the film's similarities to The Shining and Under the Shadow, but added: "Ahari finds his own narrative rhythm, though it feels sluggish in a final act that fluctuates from frantic to meditative." He concluded that the film "is at its most effectively unsettling when the focus is to evoke fear as opposed to when it physically shows what's haunting the characters trapped in their respective secret tragedies."

Matt Zoller Seitz of RogerEbert.com gave the film a score of 3.5 stars out of 4, describing it as "a knockout debut—so assured that it stands on its own as a filmmaking achievement apart from its historical significance", and adding: "But what's ultimately most impressive ... is how it manages to feel big despite being a small film, filling up the screen with atmosphere, performance, tension, and a sense of style even though it was shot quickly and cheaply in available locations". He concluded: "It's as if "The Night" is constantly playing on what we think we know about this kind of movie and recalibrating its approach in every scene to keep us as unsettled as its lead couple, who checked into the marriage crisis equivalent of the Hotel California and worry they might never leave."

Teo Bugbee, writing for The New York Times, was more critical of the film, saying: "The repetition of the visions and the film's deliberate pace gives the audience too much time to guess which betrayals haunt Babak and Neda, and this lack of emotional suspense hampers the horror."

=== Accolades ===
Award	Date of ceremony	Category	Recipient(s)	Result	Ref(s)
Grimmfest	2021	Best Feature Film	Kourosh Ahari	Won	
Molins film festival	2020	Best director	Kourosh Ahari	Won	
Molins film festival	2020	Best actor	Shahab Hosseini	Won	
Molins film festival	2020	Best Screenplay	Kourosh Ahari	Won	
ReFrame	2021	Narrative & Animated Feature	The Night	Won	
