= Kourosh Ahari =

Iranian-American film director, writer, and producer

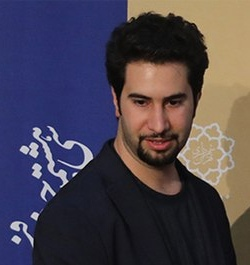
- Born: 1988 (age 37–38); Mashhad, Iran
- Years active: 2014–present

Kourosh Ahari (Persian: کوروش آهاری, Cyrus Ahari; born 1988) is an Iranian-American film director, screenwriter, and producer. He is best known for his psychological horror thriller film 2020 The Night.

He was born in 1988 in Mashhad and moved to the United States at the age of 19. Ahari has a bachelor's degree in cinema, graduating at the top of his class and receiving the Excellence in Film Directing Award.

== Films ==
- 2020: The Night
- 2024: Parallel
