= Stephen Wacker =

American comic book editor and producer (born 1970)

- Born: May 8, 1970 (age 56); St. Louis, Missouri, U.S.
- Education: University of Missouri; Stephens College
- Occupations: Comic book editor, television producer, animation producer, digital media producer, podcast producer
- Awards: Emmy Award nomination for Rocket & Groot

Stephen Wacker (born May 8, 1970) is an American comic book editor and television, animation, podcast, and digital media producer. He is currently the editor-in-chief of Marvel Comics, serving since July 2026. He was nominated for an Emmy Award for Rocket & Groot and has overseen many comic book series at DC Comics and Marvel Comics. He is well known for editing comics such as 52, The Amazing Spider-Man, Hawkeye, Ms. Marvel, Daredevil, and Captain Marvel.

== Early life ==
Stephen Wacker was born in St. Louis, Missouri on May 8, 1970.

== Career ==
Wacker got his start in comics creating a live comic-book themed show called Ka-Baam!!, which included improvisors such as Adam Felber, Paul Scheer, and Victor Varnado, and also folded in notable comic book artists and editors as guests, which led to an interview for a job at DC Comics. In 2000, Wacker was hired as an assistant editor where he worked on comics including JLA, JSA, and 52.

He was recruited by Marvel Comics in 2006 and held the position of senior editor, working primarily on the Spider-Man titles (including Brand New Day) and Guardians of the Galaxy franchises. In 2013, he relocated from Marvel Comics's New York headquarters to Marvel Animation in Los Angeles where he held the position of VP of Animation. Wacker is credited as co-executive producer on many of their animated series, including the Avengers Assemble and Guardians of the Galaxy series that aired on Disney XD. In 2017, he transferred to Marvel Television where he was a VP of Development where he produced Marvel's Hero Project, Marvel's 616, and Marvel's Behind the Mask. In 2020, Wacker transferred to Marvel Digital Media as VP Head of Content. In 2022, he was hired as editor-in-chief at 3W/3M Comics (Three Worlds/Three Moons) and left the following year to co-found the entertainment studio Stone Kite. In July 2026, Wacker was announced to be returning to Marvel Comics as its editor-in-chief, succeeding C. B. Cebulski.

=== Comics ===
- 2002 - JLA/Avengers - assistant editor
- 2000 - 2006 - JSA - editor
- 2006 - 52 - editor
- 2008 - 2014 - The Amazing Spider-man - editor
- 2010 - 2013 - Daredevil - editor
- 2010 - 2013 - Hawkeye - editor
- 2010 - 2013 - Captain Marvel - editor
- 2014 - Ms. Marvel - co-creator, co-editor
- 2021 - 2022 - It's Jeff - editor

=== Television ===
- 2019 - Marvel's Hero Project - executive producer, host
- 2020 - Marvel's 616 - executive producer
- 2021 - Marvel's Behind the Mask - executive producer

=== Television Animation ===
- 2014 - 2015 - Hulk and the Agents of S.M.A.S.H. (26 episodes) - supervising producer
- 2014 - 2017 - Ultimate Spider-Man (52 episodes) - co-executive producer
- 2014 - 2018 - Avengers Assemble (78 episodes) - co-executive producer, supervising producer
- 2015 - 2017 - Guardians of the Galaxy (51 episodes) - co-executive producer
- 2017 - Marvel's Spider-Man (11 episodes) - co-executive producer
- 2017 - Rocket & Groot - co-executive producerS

=== Podcasts ===
- 2021 - Marvel's Wastelanders: Hawkeye - executive producer
- 2021 - Marvel's Wastelanders: Old Man Star-Lord - executive producer
- 2022 - Marvel's Wastelanders: Black Widow - executive producer
- 2022 - Marvel's Wastelanders: Wolverine - executive producer
- 2022 - Marvel's Wastelanders: Doom - executive producer
- 2022 - Marvel's Squirrel Girl: The Unbeatable Radio Show - executive producer

== Awards ==
Year	Nominated work	Category	Award	Result
2006		Favorite Editor	Wizard Fan Award	Won
2010		Favorite Editor	Eagle Award	Nominated
2013		Editor of the Year	Shel Dorf Award	Won
2016	Ms. Marvel	Best Comic Book	Dragon Award	Won
2017	Rocket & Groot	Outstanding Short Form Animated Program	Primetime Emmy Award	Nominated

Preceded by C. B. Cebulski	Marvel Comics Editor-in-Chief; 2026–present	Succeeded by Incumbent
