= Marvel's Behind the Mask =

2021 documentary by Michael Jacobs

- Release poster
- Genre: Documentary
- Directed by: Michael Jacobs
- Composer: Mondo Boys
- Country of origin: United States
- Original language: English

Production
- Executive producers: Joe Quesada; Sarah Amos; Shane Rahmani; Stephen Wacker; John Cerilli; Harry Go
- Producers: Chris Gary; Ryan Simon
- Cinematography: Joshua Weinsten
- Editor: Clayton Worfolk
- Running time: 64 minutes
- Production companies: Marvel New Media; Tarmac Creative

Original release
- Network: Disney+
- Release: February 12, 2021

Related
- Marvel's 616; Marvel's Hero Project; Marvel Studios: Legends; Marvel Studios: Assembled

Marvel's Behind the Mask is a 2021 American documentary film directed by Michael Jacobs for the streaming service Disney+. Produced by Marvel New Media with Tarmac Creative, the special explores and features the writers and artists behind several characters from Marvel Comics, their impact on popular culture and media, and discussions of Marvel's history with representation and identity.

The documentary film was first announced in January 2021. Marvel's Behind the Mask was released on February 12, 2021. The film received positive reviews for its informative discussions on creating characters and their interpretations, but was criticized for steering away from the advertised topic and for the short length of discussions about specific races.

== Premise ==
Marvel's Behind the Mask features guests, including writers and artists, who were behind the making of several characters from Marvel Comics, such as Black Panther, Miles Morales, Luke Cage, the X-Men, and Captain Marvel, among others, while also highlighting the impact Marvel has had on popular culture and media.

== Background and production ==
External video
- Marvel's Behind the Mask – animation reel (1:07) by awesome and modest, Vimeo video (uploaded on July 7, 2021)

Marvel's Behind the Mask was announced in January 2021 as a documentary special for the streaming service Disney+ to explore "the power of identity" behind several popular characters from Marvel Comics by featuring guests, including writers and artists from across Marvel's 80-year history who were behind the creation of these characters, and their impact on popular culture and media. Michael Jacobs was announced as the director, with Chris Gary and Ryan Simon serving as producers for Tarmac Creative and Strike Anywhere, and Marvel New Media's Joe Quesada, Shane Rahmani, Stephen Wacker, John Cerilli, Harry Go, and Sarah Amos serving as executive producers. Joshua Weinstein served as the cinematographer, while Clayton Worfolk served as the editor, after both previously worked with Jacobs, Gary, and Simon on the Quibi docuseries Blackballed; Gary subsequently joined Marvel Studios's Production and Development group as a producer. Some notable creatives featured in interviews include Quesada, Brian Michael Bendis, Christopher Priest, Larry Hama, Nicole Georges, Ivan Velez Jr., Kelly Sue DeConnick, Reginald Hudlin, and Tony Isabella, along with media scholar Henry Jenkins, Jack Kirby's son Neal Kirby, rabbi Simcha Weinstein, and rapper Darryl McDaniels. Stan Lee also appears through archive footage.

Behind the Mask was originally conceived to showcase the history of the character T'Challa / Black Panther, in anticipation of the release of the Marvel Cinematic Universe (MCU) film Black Panther (2018), although, Jacobs, Gary, and Simon realized during their research that Marvel's efforts "to break ground" with the representation of race, gender, and sexual orientation were more complicated and rich than one character. The documentary's filmmakers said Marvel executives were supportive with a "warts-and-all look" at the company's representation efforts, especially after their "less than admirable history" of depictions of race with skin tone coloring and sexual orientation, which Gary said Marvel had accepted would be uncomfortable. Marvel were "complete partners" in this process and gave the filmmakers access to their full range of history for it. While none of the filmmakers considered themselves to be die-hard comic book fans, they became appreciative of the creators after looking through Marvel's history of the characters. Jacobs said that while much of Marvel's popular culture is surrounded by their films, Behind the Mask would be a "nice reminder" of the people who created their ideas, while noting that they had "fall[en] into stereotypes" and made mistakes, and called the comics and characters "uniquely special". Gary, who is Black, felt the use of certain colors for skin tones, such as depicting Asian characters as yellow and Black characters as grey, was shocking, and he said he did not "know how I would explain that to my kids", who have Black and Asian heritage, and said that was a "conversation you don't really want to have, but it's a necessary conversation".

Following the announcement of the documentary, Steve Seigh of JoBlo.com compared Behind the Mask to Marvel Studios's then-recently announced docuseries Marvel Studios: Legends as another "spotlight" for the exploration of identity, and called it a "great way to familiarize yourself with fictional legends that have had a tremendous impact on today's pop culture", while Ray Flook at Bleeding Cool said the documentary would be able to answer the question: "what do I really know about these characters?" by showing audiences their "secret origins". Jake Abbate of SuperHeroHype noted that while recent depictions featured superheroes with public identities, having a "double-life meant something very different" at the time many of these characters were created, and he felt the documentary would showcase how the creators used that concept to "examine the evolving concept of equal rights", as was described by Marvel. Abbate and Jamie Lovett at ComicBook.com noted that Behind the Mask followed Marvel's prior Disney+ docuseries Marvel's 616 and Marvel's Hero Project, with Abbate stating that the documentary was expected to showcase how the creators' "deftly balanc[ed] their heroics with their struggles in trying to lead 'normal' lives", while Lovett compared Behind the Mask to Marvel's 616 for focusing on the "rich legacy" of characters and creators, and how they reflect the world. Shortly after its release, David Wolinsky of GameSpot compared Behind the Mask to the then-recently announced docuseries Marvel Studios: Assembled, which he felt was a "promising follow-up" to Behind the Mask, as it was a fellow documentary series that showcased the inspiration behind Marvel's comic book heroes.

== Music ==
The group Mondo Boys served as the composers, after previously scoring Jacobs' docuseries Blackballed.

== Marketing ==
After the trailer for the documentary was released on February 2, 2021, Josh Weiss at Syfy Wire said it showed how the documentary "shines a spotlight on the human and relatable alter egos of beloved superheroes", while Eammon Jacobs at Looper called the trailer "fascinating", and said the documentary would be a "must-watch for those who see themselves in the Marvel stories they love to read on the page and watch on the big screen". Weiss, Jacobs, and Hoai-Tran Bui of /Film noted that Quesada's recount of a conversation he had with Stan Lee pondered the question: "How do you create the perfect Marvel character?", with the character Spider-Man cited as an example of exploring what the characters' problems are, to put the audience "in that suit". Bui also said it was "nice to see Disney+ using the platform to get into behind-the-scenes storytelling that highlights the artists and creatives who helped craft these characters that so heavily dominate our pop culture landscape". Christopher Tsang at Screen Rant said the trailer appeared to show that the documentary would "shed light on how the world has changed" since Marvel's founding and how the changes were reflected in the comics, in addition to exploring the legacies of Marvel's characters. He felt, with several more films planned for the Marvel Cinematic Universe (MCU) franchise, that there was "no better time to understand the people behind the mask".

The first clip from the documentary was released on February 10, 2021, and featured Quesada discussing the identity of Black Panther in his debut appearance in Fantastic Four #52 (July 1966). Rabab Khan at Game Rant said the "teaser-length clip appeals to the viewers' emotions" in discussing how the Fantastic Four team did not "seem to make a big deal about T'Challa being Black", and noted that cutaway shots from this discussion used old footage of police officers arresting Black men in what he said looked like a Western country.

== Release ==
Behind the Mask was released on Disney+ on February 12, 2021.

== Reception ==
Writing for Laughing Place, Mike Mack said "[o]n the surface, Marvel's Behind the Mask is more or less another history lesson on the creation and growth of Marvel Comics", but noted that the creators' discussions of creating characters that audiences can connect with made it feel like a "MasterClass on how to create interesting characters who can stand the test of time from creators who have done exactly that". He also noted "some great stories" about Stan Lee and Jack Kirby from Kirby's son Neal and others about inclusion and making the Marvel Universe feel "familiar to the world in which we all live". Mack said he first questioned if the discussions of secret identities would sustain the hourlong runtime, and said while it did not become a "simple history lesson" on Marvel Comics, he felt it did "stray from the subject illustrated in the title" by having the second half of the documentary focusing "more on the concept of identity and the inclusion of various types", and said that the "result is a beautiful look at the diverse and ever-growing tapestry that is the Marvel Universe".

Gary Catig at AIPT Comics said that the documentary "serves as a good introduction for both those new to comics and to those curious after watching the films" by following several key creators as well as characters who appeared in the Marvel Cinematic Universe, and said it could also cater to hardcore fans. He found it intriguing how the documentary presented different interpretations of the characters from several people. He concluded that Behind the Mask could have benefited from a longer runtime, and criticized the timing of discussions for diversity, particularly the discussion about the Asian influences being shorter than others, and the lack of discussion of indigenous and Latinx characters and creators, but said it was overall enjoyable. Jade-Louise Yates of TWM+ also noted how the documentary's "original topic is not really delved into" and called it "more of an entertaining look behind the curtain" that offered a lot for Marvel Comics fans "to relish".

== See also ==
- MPower, a 2023 Marvel documentary series
