= List of comic book and superhero podcasts =

This is a list of comic book and superhero podcasts. The list contains podcasts that have been explicitly described as comic book podcasts or superhero podcasts by reliable secondary sources that demonstrate each podcast's notability. The type of release can be either episodic or serial, while the delivery of each podcast can vary significantly from a fully scripted audio drama to an unscripted conversation. Other styles can include interview, improvised skit, or narrated short stories. The contents of each podcast can vary from stories of fiction to nonfiction discussions revolving around fiction in media.

== List ==
List of comic book podcasts
Podcast	Year	Genre	Host(s) or Starring	Produced by	Ref
Batman: The Audio Adventures	2021	Audio drama	Jeffrey Wright, Chris Parnell, Ike Barinholtz, Rosario Dawson, Brent Spiner, Jason Sudeikis	Blue Ribbon Content, Insurrection Media, Inc.	
Batman Unburied	2022–present	Audio drama	Winston Duke, Hasan Minhaj, Gina Rodriguez, Colman Domingo	Spotify Studios	
Batman v Superman: By the Minute	2019–present	Commentary	Andrew Dyce & Stephen Colbert	Independent	
Bitches on Comics	2019-present	Interview and commentary	Sara Century, S.E. Fleenor, and Monika Estrella Negra	Independent	
Capes On The Couch	2018-present	Commentary	Anthony Sytko and Doc Issues	Independent	
Cerebro	2020–present	Interview and commentary	Connor Goldsmith	Independent	
City of Supers	2022–present	Improv comedy	Nick Connors and Brendan Connors	Independent	
Collected Comics Library	2005–2021	Interview and commentary	Chris Marshall	Independent	
Comadres Y Comics	2016-2021	Interview and commentary	Sara Bazan, Jennifer Lopez, and Kristen Parraz	Independent	
Comic Book Central	2013–present	Interview, news, and commentary	Joe Stuber	Joe Stuber	
Comic Book Club	2008–present	Interview, news, and commentary	Justin Tyler, Pete LePage, and Alex Zalben	Nerdist Industries	
Comic Book Commentary	2018–present	Interview and commentary	Ben Blacker	ForeverDog	
Comic Book Couples Counseling	2020-present	Interview and commentary	Brad & Lisa Gullickson	Independent	
Comic Book Girl 19	2013–2020	Audio drama	Danika XIX	Independent	
Comic Book Workshop	2018–present	Interview and commentary	Jason Holiday Ham and Kent Heidelman	TMBC Productions	
The Comic Conspiracy	2011–present	Interview and commentary	Ryan Higgins, Brock Sager, Toby Sidler, and Charlie West	GeekBox	
Comic Geek Speak	2005–present	Interview and commentary	Bryan Deemer, Peter Rios, Shane Kelly, Brian "Pants" Christman	Speakers of Geek	
The Comic Source	2015–present	Interview and commentary	Jace Milam	LRM Online	
Comicsverse	2012–present	Interview, news, and commentary	Justin Gilbert Alba, Anatole Ashraf, Kathleen Wisneski	Atabey Media	
Creator at Large	2018–2019	Interview	Jeremy Melloul	Independent	
Doctor DC Podcast	2017–present	Commentary	Reid Vanier and Richard Eden	Brain Freeze	
Fatman Beyond	2012–present	Interview and commentary	Kevin Smith, Marc Bernardin	SModcast Podcast Network	
First Issue Club	2017-present	Interview and commentary	Andy, Greg, & Mike	Independent	
Graphic Novel TK	2018–2022	Interview and commentary	Alison Wilgus and Gina Gagliano	The Beat	
Harley Quinn and The Joker: Sound Mind	2023	Audio drama	Christina Ricci, Billy Magnussen	Spotify Studios	
iFanboy	2005–present	Interview and commentary	Josh Flanagan, Conor Kilpatrick, Paul Montgomery, Ron Richards	iFanboy	
Jay & Miles X-Plain the X-Men	2014-present	Commentary	Jay Edidin and Miles Stokes	Independent	
King Kirby	2020–present	Audio drama	Crystal Skillman and Fred Van Lente	Independent	
Listen Up, Poozers - A Green Lantern Podcast	2024- present	Commentary	Samuel of Sector 2814	Independent	
Make It Then Tell Everybody	2012–2023	Interview and commentary	Dan Berry	Independent	
Marvel's Pull List	2018-present	Interview	Ryan "Agent M" Penagos and Tucker Markus	Marvel Entertainment	
Marvel's Voices	2018-2023	Interview	Angélique Roché	Marvel Entertainment	
Marvel's Wastelanders	2021–2023	Audio drama	Timothy Busfield, Stephen Lang, Susan Sarandon, Robert Patrick, and Dylan Baker	Marvel New Media and SiriusXM	
Marveling At Marvel's Marvels	2016-present	Commentary	Allen, Josef, and Jonathan	Independent	
MCU Rewind	2017-present	Commentary	Al Rodriguez and Tony Camarena	Independent	
The Other Identity	2018–2021	News and commentary	Robbie Landis and Ben Morse	Independent	
Pete's Basement	2008–2022	Interview, news, and commentary	Pete, Roger, Adam Wiesen, Steve and Ramon	Ripped Productions	
Red Rhino	2018–2019	Audio drama	Meghan Fitzmartin	Independent	
Redwing	2017–2019	Audio drama	Atticus Jackson, Graham Rowat, Zane Sexton	Earth-317 Productions	
Serious Issues	2016-2022	Review and commentary	Andrew Levins and Siobhan Coombs	Independent	
Super Ordinary	2018–2020	Audio drama	Marissa Kumari, Miya Kodama, Briggon Snow, Julia Morizawa	Tandon Productions	
Talkin' Comics	2013–2015	Interview and commentary	Amy Dallen	Geek & Sundry	
Tara Tremendous	2019–2022	Audio drama	Mariana Harrison	Wonkybot Studios	
That! Comic Podcast	2023–present	Interview and commentary	Mendte and Mr. Maurer with co-hosts Mashko, Features and Huey	That! Podcast Network	
This Week in Marvel	2011-present	News and interviews	Ryan "Agent M" Penagos, Lorraine Cink, and James Monroe Iglehart	Marvel Entertainment	
The Van	2018–2019	Audio drama	Leslie Gideon, Dina Laura, Julia Rose Herman, Jeff Ebner, Elliot Frances Flynn, Em Mantoani, Graham Rowat, Vinny Ali	Whale Bus	
The Weekly Planet	2013–present	News and commentary	James Clement and Nick Mason	Planet Broadcasting	
Women of Marvel	2014-present	Interview	Ellie Pyle, Angelique Roché, and Judy Stephens	Marvel Entertainment	
Wolverine	2018–2019	Audio drama	Richard Armitage	Marvel New Media and Stitcher	
Word Balloon	2015–present	Interview	John Siuntres	Independent	
X-Reads: An X-Men Experience	2019–present	Interview & Commentary	Chandler Poling & Chris Riley	Giant-Size Productions	

== See also ==
- List of radio dramas based on Marvel Comics publications
- List of comic books
- List of superheroes
