= Marvel Animation (disambiguation) =

Marvel Animation is a television production company formed in 2008, officially named Marvel Animation & Family Entertainment.

Marvel Animation may also refer to:

- Marvel Studios Animation, a division of Marvel Studios also called Marvel Animation formed in 2021
- Marvel Animation Studios, a division of Marvel Animation formed in 2012
- Marvel Films Animation, a production company part of Marvel Films active from 1993 to 1996; see Marvel Studios § Marvel Films (1993–1996)
- Marvel Productions, a production company active from 1981 to 1993
- Marvel Comics Animation, a production company active from 1978 to 1980; see Marvel Comics § Productions

== See also ==
- Marvel Animated Features
- Marvel Anime
- List of television series based on Marvel Comics publications § Animated
