= List of radio dramas based on Marvel Comics publications =

Media based on Marvel Comics publications

Below is a list of audio dramas based on properties of Marvel Comics. This list includes radio dramas, podcasts, and rock operas.

== List ==
Title	Seasons	Episodes	Original airing	Production company	Ref.
Doctor Strange	1	17	1967–1970	WBAI	
Adventures of the Fantastic Four	1	13	1975	Marvel Comics Group	
Spider-Man: Rock Reflections of a Superhero	1	23	1975	Lifesong Records	
The Amazing Spider-Man	1	50	1996	BBC Radio 1	
Wolverine	2	20	2018–2019	Marvel New Media / Stitcher	
Marvels	1	10	2019	Marvel New Media / Stitcher	
Wolverine: La Larga Noche	1	10	2021	Marvel New Media / SiriusXM	
Marvel's Wastelanders: Star-Lord	1	10	2021	Marvel New Media / SiriusXM	
Marvel's Wastelanders: Hawkeye	1	10	2021	Marvel New Media / SiriusXM	
Marvel's Wastelanders: Wolverine	1	10	2022	Marvel New Media / SiriusXM	
Marvel's Wastelanders: Black Widow	1	10	2022	Marvel New Media / SiriusXM	
Marvel's Wastelanders: Doom	1	10	2022	Marvel New Media / SiriusXM	
Marvel's Wastelanders	1	10	2022	Marvel New Media / SiriusXM	
Squirrel Girl: The Unbeatable Radio Show!	1	6	2022	Marvel New Media / SiriusXM	

== See also ==
- List of television series based on Marvel Comics publications
- List of films based on Marvel Comics publications
- Marvel Games
- List of novels based on Marvel Comics publications
- List of Marvel RPG supplements
- List of comic book and superhero podcasts
