= List of television series based on Marvel Comics publications =

The logo for the Marvel Television label of Marvel Studios introduced in 2024

Below is a list of television series based on properties of Marvel Comics. This list includes live-action and animated series.

== Live-action ==
All series produced by Marvel Studios and Marvel Television are set in the Marvel Cinematic Universe (MCU) unless otherwise noted.

| Title | Seasons | Episodes | Original broadcast | Production company(s) | Network | Notes / Ref(s) |
|---|---|---|---|---|---|---|
| Spidey Super Stories | 3 | 29 | 1974–1977 | Children's Television Workshop | PBS | Segments on seasons 4–6 of The Electric Company. |
| The Amazing Spider-Man | 2 | 13 | 1977–1979 | Columbia Pictures Television / Charles Fries Productions / Dan Goodman Productions | CBS | Started with a television film. |
| The Incredible Hulk | 5 | 80 | 1977–1982 | Universal Television / Marvel Comics | CBS | Started with 2 television films and ended with 3 television films post-series between 1988 and 1990 |
| Spider-Man | 1 | 41 | 1978–1979 | Toei Company / Toei Advertising / Tokyo Channel 12 | Tokyo Channel 12 | Also features a film. Japanese co-production. |
| Blade: The Series | 1 | 12 | 2006 | New Line Television / Marvel Entertainment / Phantom Four Films | Spike | Takes place after the events of Blade: Trinity. |
| Agents of S.H.I.E.L.D. | 7 | 136 | 2013–2020 | ABC Studios / Marvel Television / Mutant Enemy Productions | ABC | |
| Agent Carter | 2 | 18 | 2015–2016 | ABC Studios / Marvel Television / Fazekas & Butters | ABC | |
| Daredevil | 3 | 39 | 2015–2018 | ABC Studios / Marvel Television / DeKnight Productions / Goddard Textiles | Netflix | Part of Marvel's Netflix television series |
| Jessica Jones | 3 | 39 | 2015–2019 | ABC Studios / Marvel Television / Tall Girls Productions | Netflix | Part of Marvel's Netflix television series |
| Luke Cage | 2 | 26 | 2016–2018 | ABC Studios / Marvel Television | Netflix | Part of Marvel's Netflix television series |
| Legion | 3 | 27 | 2017–2019 | FX Productions / Marvel Television / Kinberg Genre / Bad Hat Harry Productions / The Donners' Company / 26 Keys Productions | FX | Connected to the X-Men film series. |
| Iron Fist | 2 | 23 | 2017–2018 | ABC Studios / Marvel Television / Devilina Productions | Netflix | Part of Marvel's Netflix television series |
| The Defenders | 1 | 8 | 2017 | ABC Studios / Marvel Television / Goddard Textiles / Nine and a Half Fingers, Inc. | Netflix | Part of Marvel's Netflix television series |
| Inhumans | 1 | 8 | 2017 | ABC Studios / Marvel Television / Devilina Productions | ABC | Versions of the first two episodes screened in IMAX theaters before its premiere on ABC. |
| The Gifted | 2 | 29 | 2017–2019 | 20th Century Fox Television / Marvel Television / Kinberg Genre / Bad Hat Harry Productions / The Donners' Company / Flying Glass of Milk Productions | Fox | Connected to the X-Men film series. |
| The Punisher | 2 | 26 | 2017–2019 | ABC Studios / Marvel Television / Bohemian Risk Productions | Netflix | Part of Marvel's Netflix television series |
| Runaways | 3 | 33 | 2017–2019 | ABC Signature Studios / Marvel Television / Fake Empire | Hulu | |
| Cloak & Dagger | 2 | 20 | 2018–2019 | ABC Signature Studios / Marvel Television / Wandering Rocks Productions | Freeform | |
| Helstrom | 1 | 10 | 2020 | ABC Signature Studios / Marvel Television (Note: Production of Helstrom was moved to Marvel Studios following the shutdown of Marvel Television, with executives from Marvel Television staying on to supervise the completion of the series.) | Hulu | Not part of the MCU, according to the showrunner. |
| WandaVision | 1 | 9 | 2021 | Marvel Studios | Disney+ | |
| The Falcon and the Winter Soldier | 1 | 6 | 2021 | Marvel Studios | Disney+ | |
| Loki | 2 | 12 | 2021–2023 | Marvel Studios | Disney+ | |
| Hawkeye | 1 | 6 | 2021 | Marvel Studios | Disney+ | |
| Moon Knight | 1 | 6 | 2022 | Marvel Studios | Disney+ | |
| Ms. Marvel | 1 | 6 | 2022 | Marvel Studios | Disney+ | |
| She-Hulk: Attorney at Law | 1 | 9 | 2022 | Marvel Studios | Disney+ | |
| Secret Invasion | 1 | 6 | 2023 | Marvel Studios | Disney+ | |
| Echo | 1 | 5 | 2024 | Marvel Studios | Disney+ | First release under the "Marvel Spotlight" banner. |
| Agatha All Along | 1 | 9 | 2024 | Marvel Television | Disney+ | |
| Ironheart | 1 | 6 | 2025 | Marvel Television / Proximity Media | Disney+ | |
| Wonder Man | 1 | 8 | 2026 | Marvel Television | Disney+ | Released under the "Marvel Spotlight" banner. |
| Spider-Noir | 1 | 8 | 2026 | Sony Pictures Television / Amazon MGM Studios / Lord Miller Productions / Pascal Pictures / Bohemian Risk Productions / Oren | MGM+ / Amazon Prime Video | Part of Sony's Spider-Man Universe |
| VisionQuest | 1 | 8 | 2026 | Marvel Television | Disney+ | |
Ongoing
| Daredevil: Born Again | 2 | 17 | 2025–present | Marvel Television | Disney+ | Renewed for a third and final season. |
Upcoming
| Clone Saga | TBA | TBA | TBA | Sony Pictures Television | Amazon Prime Video | |
| Zodiac | TBA | TBA | 2028 | Marvel Television | Disney+ | Live-action global spy thriller series. |

=== Series inspired by Marvel Comics ===
| Title | Seasons | Episodes | Original broadcast | Production company(s) | Network | Notes / Ref(s) |
|---|---|---|---|---|---|---|
| Battle Fever J | 1 | 52 | 1979–1980 | Toei Company / TV Asahi / Marvel Comics | TV Asahi | Part of the Super Sentai metaseries and Marvel's Earth-79203. Japanese co-productions. |
| Denshi Sentai Denjiman | 1 | 51 | 1980–1981 | Toei Company / Toei Advertising / TV Asahi / Marvel Comics | TV Asahi | Part of the Super Sentai metaseries and Marvel's Earth-79203. Japanese co-productions. |
| Taiyo Sentai Sun Vulcan | 1 | 50 | 1981–1982 | Toei Company / TV Asahi / Marvel Comics | TV Asahi | Part of the Super Sentai metaseries and Marvel's Earth-79203. Japanese co-productions. |
| Mutant X | 3 | 66 | 2001–2004 | Marvel Studios / Tribune Entertainment / Fireworks Entertainment / Global Television Network | Syndication | Originally intended to be a series about the X-Men, the show had to be changed for legal reasons. |

=== From Marvel imprints ===
==== Malibu Comics ====
| Title | Seasons | Episodes | Original broadcast | Production company(s) | Network | Notes / Ref(s) |
|---|---|---|---|---|---|---|
| Night Man | 2 | 44 | 1997–1999 | Tribune Entertainment / Glen A. Larson Entertainment Network / Village Roadshow Pictures (season 1) / ProSieben Media (season 1) / Atlantis Films (season 1) / Alliance Atlantis Productions (season 2) / WIC Entertainment (season 2) / Crescent Entertainment (season 2) | Syndication | |

==== Icon Comics ====
| Title | Seasons | Episodes | Original broadcast | Production company(s) | Network | Notes / Ref(s) |
|---|---|---|---|---|---|---|
| Powers | 2 | 20 | 2015–2016 | Sony Pictures Television / Circle of Confusion / Jinxworld | PlayStation Network | |
Upcoming
| Criminal | 1 | 8 | 2027 | Amazon MGM Studios / Legendary Television | Amazon Prime Video | |

=== Television specials ===
All specials produced by Marvel Studios are set in the Marvel Cinematic Universe (MCU) unless otherwise noted.

| Title | Year | Production company(s) | Network | Collection | Notes / Ref(s) |
|---|---|---|---|---|---|
| Werewolf by Night | 2022 | Marvel Studios | Disney+ | Marvel's Special Presentations | Halloween special; a fully colorized version, Werewolf by Night in Color, was released in October 2023. |
| The Guardians of the Galaxy Holiday Special | 2022 | Marvel Studios | Disney+ | Marvel's Special Presentations | Holiday special |
| The Punisher: One Last Kill | 2026 | Marvel Studios | Disney+ | Marvel's Special Presentations | |

=== Web series ===
| Title | Year | Seasons | Episodes | Production company(s) | Website(s) | Notes / Refs |
|---|---|---|---|---|---|---|
| WHIH Newsfront | 2015–2016 | 1 | 10 | Marvel Studios | YouTube | |
| Agents of S.H.I.E.L.D.: Slingshot | 2016 | 1 | 6 | ABC Studios / Marvel Television | ABC.com / YouTube | |
| The Daily Bugle | 2019–2022 | 3 | 29 | Sony Pictures / Marvel Studios (seasons 1–2) | YouTube (seasons 1–2) / TikTok (seasons 2–3) | |

=== Pilots ===
| Title | Year | Production company(s) | Network | Notes / Ref(s) |
|---|---|---|---|---|
| Power Pack | 1991 | New World Television | NBC | |
| Marvel's Most Wanted | 2016 | ABC Studios / Marvel Television | —N/a | Unaired. Intended as part of the Marvel Cinematic Universe and originally developed for ABC. |
| New Warriors | 2017 | ABC Signature Studios / Marvel Television | —N/a | Unaired. Intended as part of the Marvel Cinematic Universe and originally developed for Freeform. Rejected, never found a new network. |

=== Unscripted ===
| Title | Seasons | Episodes | Original broadcast | Production company(s) | Network | Notes / Ref(s) |
|---|---|---|---|---|---|---|
| Marvel Studios: Assembling a Universe | —N/a | —N/a | 2014 | ABC Studios / Marvel Television | ABC | Television special |
| Marvel 75 Years: From Pulp to Pop! | —N/a | —N/a | 2014 | ABC Studios / Marvel Television | ABC | Television special |
| Marvel's Hero Project | 1 | 20 | 2019–2020 | Marvel New Media / Supper Club | Disney+ | |
| Marvel Studios: Expanding the Universe | —N/a | —N/a | 2019 | Marvel Studios | Disney+ | Television special |
| Marvel's 616 | 1 | 8 | 2020 | Marvel New Media / Supper Club | Disney+ | |
| Marvel Studios: Assembled | 1 | 23 | 2021–2024 | Marvel Studios | Disney+ | |
| Voices Rising: The Music of Wakanda Forever | 1 | 3 | 2023 | Marvel New Media / Supper Club | Disney+ | |
| MPower | 1 | 4 | 2023 | Marvel New Media / Supper Club | Disney+ | |
Ongoing
| Marvel Studios: Legends | 3 | 49 | 2021–present | Marvel Studios | Disney+ (seasons 1–2) / YouTube (season 3) | |

== Animated ==
The logo for the Marvel Animation label of Marvel Studios, introduced in 2024

| Title | Seasons | Episodes | Original broadcast | Production company(s) | Network | Notes / Ref(s) |
|---|---|---|---|---|---|---|
| The Marvel Super Heroes | 1 | 65 | 1966 | Grantray-Lawrence Animation / Marvel Comics Group | ABC | Anthology with rotating segments. |
| The Fantastic Four | 1 | 20 | 1967–1968 | Hanna-Barbera Productions / Marvel Comics Group | ABC | |
| Spider-Man | 3 | 52 | 1967–1970 | Grantray-Lawrence Animation (season 1) / Krantz Films (seasons 2–3) / Marvel Comics Group | ABC | |
| The New Fantastic Four | 1 | 13 | 1978 | DePatie-Freleng Enterprises / Marvel Comics Animation | NBC | |
| Fred and Barney Meet the Thing | 1 | 13 | 1979 | Hanna-Barbera Productions / Marvel Comics Group | NBC | Crossover with The Flintstones. |
| Spider-Woman | 1 | 16 | 1979–1980 | DePatie-Freleng Enterprises / Marvel Comics Animation | ABC | |
| Spider-Man | 1 | 26 | 1981–1982 | Marvel Productions | Syndication | |
| Spider-Man and His Amazing Friends | 3 | 24 | 1981–1983 | Marvel Productions | NBC | |
| The Incredible Hulk | 1 | 13 | 1982–1983 | Marvel Productions | NBC | |
| X-Men: The Animated Series | 5 | 76 | 1992–1997 | Marvel Entertainment Group / Saban Entertainment / Graz Entertainment | Fox Kids | |
| Iron Man | 2 | 26 | 1994–1996 | Marvel Entertainment Group / Marvel Films / Rainbow Animation Studio (season 1) / Koko Enterprise (season 2) | Syndication | Aired as part of The Marvel Action Hour. |
| Fantastic Four | 2 | 26 | 1994–1996 | Marvel Entertainment Group / Marvel Films / Wang Film Productions (season 1) / Philippine Animation Studio (season 2) | Syndication | Aired as part of The Marvel Action Hour. |
| Spider-Man: The Animated Series | 5 | 65 | 1994–1998 | Marvel Entertainment Group / Marvel Films / Saban Entertainment | Fox Kids | |
| The Incredible Hulk | 2 | 21 | 1996–1997 | Marvel Entertainment Group / Marvel Films / New World Animation (season 1) / Saban Entertainment (season 2) | UPN | |
| Silver Surfer | 1 | 13 | 1998 | Marvel Entertainment Group / Marvel Studios / Saban Entertainment | Fox Kids | |
| Spider-Man Unlimited | 1 | 13 | 1999–2001 | Marvel Studios / Saban Entertainment | Fox Kids | |
| The Avengers: United They Stand | 1 | 13 | 1999–2000 | Marvel Studios / Saban Entertainment | Fox Kids | |
| X-Men: Evolution | 4 | 52 | 2000–2003 | Marvel Studios / Film Roman | The WB | |
| Spider-Man: The New Animated Series | 1 | 13 | 2003 | Sony Pictures Television / Adelaide Productions / Marvel Enterprises / Mainframe Entertainment | MTV | |
| Fantastic Four: World's Greatest Heroes | 1 | 26 | 2006–2007 | Marvel Studios / MoonScoop Group | Cartoon Network (Europe) / M6 (France) | |
| The Spectacular Spider-Man | 2 | 26 | 2008–2009 | Sony Pictures Television / Adelaide Productions / Culver Entertainment / Marvel Entertainment | The CW (season 1) / Disney XD (season 2) | |
| Wolverine and the X-Men | 1 | 26 | 2009 | Marvel Studios / Toonz Entertainment / First Serve International / Liberation Entertainment / EVA Finance GmbH | Nicktoons | |
| Iron Man: Armored Adventures | 2 | 52 | 2009–2012 | Marvel Animation / Method Animation / DQ Entertainment / Isle of Man Film (season 1) / Genius (season 1) / LuxAnimation (season 1) / Fabrique D'Images (season 2) / France Télévisions (season 2) / Onyx Lux (season 2) | France 2 (France, season 1) / France 4 (France, season 2) / Nicktoons (U.S.) | |
| The Super Hero Squad Show | 2 | 52 | 2009–2011 | Marvel Animation / Film Roman | Cartoon Network | |
| The Avengers: Earth's Mightiest Heroes | 2 | 52 | 2010–2012 | Marvel Animation / Film Roman | Disney XD | |
| Marvel Anime: Iron Man | 1 | 12 | 2010–2011 (Japan); 2011–2012 (U.S.) | Sony Pictures Entertainment Japan / Marvel Entertainment / Madhouse | Animax (Japan); G4 (U.S.) | Each anime series consisted of 12 episodes. |
| Marvel Anime: Wolverine | 1 | 12 | 2010–2011 (Japan); 2011–2012 (U.S.) | Sony Pictures Entertainment Japan / Marvel Entertainment / Madhouse | Animax (Japan); G4 (U.S.) | Each anime series consisted of 12 episodes. |
| Marvel Anime: X-Men | 1 | 12 | 2010–2011 (Japan); 2011–2012 (U.S.) | Sony Pictures Entertainment Japan / Marvel Entertainment / Madhouse | Animax (Japan); G4 (U.S.) | Each anime series consisted of 12 episodes. |
| Marvel Anime: Blade | 1 | 12 | 2010–2011 (Japan); 2011–2012 (U.S.) | Sony Pictures Entertainment Japan / Marvel Entertainment / Madhouse | Animax (Japan); G4 (U.S.) | Each anime series consisted of 12 episodes. |
| Ultimate Spider-Man | 4 | 104 | 2012–2017 | Marvel Animation / Film Roman | Disney XD | |
| Avengers Assemble | 5 | 127 | 2013–2019 | Marvel Animation | Disney XD | |
| Hulk and the Agents of S.M.A.S.H. | 2 | 52 | 2013–2015 | Film Roman / Marvel Animation | Disney XD | |
| Marvel Disk Wars: The Avengers | 1 | 51 | 2014–2015 (Japan); 2015–2016 (Philippines) | The Walt Disney Company Japan / Marvel Entertainment / Toei Animation | TX Network (Japan) / Disney XD (Southeast Asia) | Anime. |
| Guardians of the Galaxy | 3 | 79 | 2015–2019 | Marvel Animation | Disney XD | |
| Marvel Future Avengers | 2 | 39 | 2017–2018 | The Walt Disney Company Japan / Marvel Entertainment / Madhouse | Dlife | Anime. |
| Marvel's Spider-Man | 3 | 58 | 2017–2020 | Marvel Animation | Disney XD | |
| Big Hero 6: The Series | 3 | 56 | 2017–2021 | Disney Television Animation | Disney XD (seasons 1, 3) / Disney Channel (season 2) | Continuation of the 2014 film loosely based on Marvel Comics. |
| M.O.D.O.K. | 1 | 10 | 2021 | Marvel Television / Stoopid Buddy Stoodios / 10K / Multiverse Cowboy | Hulu | First adult-oriented series. |
| What If...? | 3 | 26 | 2021–2024 | Marvel Studios Animation | Disney+ | Part of the Marvel Cinematic Universe. |
| Hit-Monkey | 2 | 20 | 2021–2024 | Marvel Television (season 1) / 20th Television Animation (season 2) / Floyd County Productions / Speck & Gordon | Hulu | |
| Moon Girl and Devil Dinosaur | 2 | 41 | 2023–2025 | Disney Television Animation / Marvel Animation / Cinema Gypsy Productions | Disney Channel | |
| Eyes of Wakanda | 1 | 4 | 2025 | Marvel Studios Animation / Proximity Media | Disney+ | Part of the Marvel Cinematic Universe. |
Ongoing
| Spidey and His Amazing Friends | 5 | 111 | 2021–present | Marvel Animation (season 1) / Marvel Studios Animation (season 2–present) / Atomic Cartoons | Disney Jr. | Renewed for a sixth and seventh season. |
| X-Men '97 | 2 | 19 | 2024–present | Marvel Studios Animation | Disney+ | Revival and sequel to X-Men: The Animated Series. Renewed for a third season. |
| Your Friendly Neighborhood Spider-Man | 1 | 10 | 2025–present | Marvel Studios Animation | Disney+ | Part of the Marvel Cinematic Universe. Renewed for a second and third season. |
| Iron Man and His Awesome Friends | 1 | 30 | 2025–present | Marvel Studios Animation / Atomic Cartoons | Disney Jr. | Spin-off of Spidey and His Amazing Friends. |
| Marvel Zombies | 1 | 4 | 2025–present | Marvel Studios Animation / Proximity Media | Disney+ | Part of the Marvel Cinematic Universe. Follow-up to the What If...? episode "What If... Zombies?!". Renewed for a second season. |
Upcoming
| Avengers: Mightiest Friends | 1 | TBA | 2027 | Marvel Studios Animation / Atomic Cartoons | Disney Jr. | Spin-off of Spidey and His Amazing Friends. |

=== From Marvel imprints ===
==== From Malibu Comics ====
| Title | Seasons | Episodes | Original broadcast | Production company(s) | Network | Notes / Ref(s) |
|---|---|---|---|---|---|---|
| Ultraforce | 1 | 13 | 1994–1995 | DIC Productions, L.P. / Bohbot Entertainment | USA Network | |
| Men in Black: The Series | 4 | 53 | 1997–2001 | Columbia TriStar Television / Adelaide Productions / Amblin Entertainment | The WB (Kids' WB) | |

==== From Icon Comics ====
| Title | Seasons | Episodes | Original broadcast | Production company(s) | Network | Notes / Ref(s) |
|---|---|---|---|---|---|---|
| Super Crooks | 1 | 13 | 2021 | Millarworld / Bones | Netflix | Anime |

=== Pilots ===
| Title | Original broadcast | Production company(s) | Network | Notes / Ref(s) |
|---|---|---|---|---|
| Solarman | 1988 | Marvel Productions | Syndication | |
| X-Men: Pryde of the X-Men | 1989 | Marvel Productions | Syndication | |
| Marvel: All Winners Squad | 2012 | Marvel Entertainment | | |

=== Television specials ===
| Title | Year | Production company(s) | Network | Notes / Ref(s) |
|---|---|---|---|---|
| Phineas and Ferb: Mission Marvel | 2013 | Disney Television Animation | Disney Channel / Disney XD | It aired on August 16, 2013, on Disney Channel and on August 25, 2013, on Disney XD. |
| Spidey and Iron Man: Avengers Team-Up! | 2025 | Marvel Studios Animation / Atomic Cartoons | Disney Jr. | Crossover special between Spidey and His Amazing Friends and Iron Man and His Awesome Friends |
| Spidey and the Avengers: Halloween Team-Up! | 2026 | Marvel Studios Animation / Atomic Cartoons | Disney Jr. | Crossover special between Spidey and His Amazing Friends and Iron Man and His Awesome Friends |
Upcoming
| Marvel Zombies: The Winter Soldier | 2027 | Marvel Studios Animation | Disney+ | Part of the Marvel Cinematic Universe |
| Marvel Zombies: The Fist of Khonshu | 2028 | Marvel Studios Animation | Disney+ | Part of the Marvel Cinematic Universe |
| Marvel Zombies: The Last Guardian | 2029 | Marvel Studios Animation | Disney+ | Part of the Marvel Cinematic Universe |

=== Direct-to-video and digital series ===
| Title | Original broadcast | Episodes |
|---|---|---|
| Astonishing X-Men: Gifted | October 27, 2009 (iTunes); September 28, 2010 (DVD) | 6 |
| Black Panther | January 16, 2010 | 6 |
| Iron Man: Extremis | April 16, 2010 (iTunes) | 6 |
| Spider-Woman: Agent of S.W.O.R.D. | June 14, 2011 (DVD) | 5 |
| Thor / Loki: Blood Brothers | March 14, 2011 (iTunes) | 4 |
| Astonishing X-Men: Dangerous | April 10, 2012 (DVD) | 6 |
| Astonishing X-Men: Torn | August 14, 2012 (DVD) | 6 |
| Astonishing X-Men: Unstoppable | November 13, 2012 (DVD) | 7 |
| Inhumans | April 23, 2013 (DVD) | 12 |
| Wolverine: Origin | July 9, 2013 (DVD) | 6 |
| Ultimate Wolverine Vs. Hulk | September 10, 2013 (DVD) | 6 |
| Wolverine Versus Sabretooth | January 14, 2014 (DVD) | 6 |
| Wolverine: Weapon X: Tomorrow Dies Today | May 13, 2014 (DVD) | 6 |
| Eternals | September 16, 2014 (DVD) | 10 |
| Wolverine Versus Sabretooth: Reborn | March 24, 2015 (DVD) | 4 |

=== Web and shorts series ===
| Title | Original broadcast | Seasons | Episodes | Production company(s) | Website(s) | Notes / Ref(s) |
|---|---|---|---|---|---|---|
| Fury Files | 2012–2013 | 2 | 21 | Marvel Entertainment / Marvel Animation | Disney XD | |
| Marvel Video Comics a.k.a. Marvel Ultimate Comics | 2016 | 1 | 4 | Marvel Entertainment | YouTube (Disney XD channel) | |
| Marvel Funko Shorts | 2016–2022 | 4 | 14 | A Large Evil Corporation / Funko Animation Studios | YouTube (Marvel Entertainment channel) | |
| Marvel's Rocket & Groot | 2017 | 1 | 12 | Marvel Animation / Passion Pictures | Disney XD | |
| Marvel's Ant-Man | 2017 | 1 | 6 | Marvel Animation / Passion Pictures | Disney XD | |
| Marvel Super Hero Adventures | 2017–2020 | 4 | 50 | Marvel Animation | Disney Channel (Disney Jr. block) / Disney Jr. / YouTube (Marvel HQ channel) | |
| Marvel Rising: Initiation | 2018 | 1 | 6 | Marvel Animation / Passion Pictures | Disney XD | |
| Baymax And | 2018 | 1 | 6 | Disney Television Animation | YouTube (Disney Channel channel) | |
| Baymax Dreams | 2018–2021 | 1 | 6 | Disney Television Animation | Disney Channel / YouTube (Disney Channel channel) | |
| Big Chibi 6 The Shorts | 2018–2019 | 1 | 12 | Disney Television Animation | Disney Channel / YouTube (Disney Channel channel) | |
| Baymax & Mochi | 2019 | 1 | 3 | Disney Television Animation | Disney Channel / YouTube (Disney Channel channel) | |
| Marvel Battleworld | 2020–2021 | 2 | 12 | Funko Animation Studios | YouTube (Marvel HQ channel) / Disney+ | Season 1 is subtitled Mystery of the Thanostones. Season 2 is subtitled Treachery at Twilight. |
| Baymax! | 2022 | 1 | 6 | Walt Disney Animation Studios | Disney+ | Spin-off of Big Hero 6. |
| I Am Groot | 2022–2023 | 2 | 10 | Marvel Studios Animation | Disney+ | Part of the Marvel Cinematic Universe. |
Ongoing
| Marvel Superheroes: What the--?! | 2009–2017, 2023–present | 1 | 122 | Marvel Entertainment | Marvel.com | While its original run ended in 2017, it was revived in the end of 2023, with an official announcement made in 2024, then semi-regular episodes were revived in 2025. |
| Meet Spidey and His Amazing Friends | 2021–present | 5 | 52 | Marvel Animation (season 1) / Marvel Studios Animation (season 2–present) / Atomic Cartoons | Disney Channel (Disney Jr. block) / Disney Jr./ YouTube (Disney Jr. / Marvel HQ channel) / Disney+ | |
| Meet Iron Man and His Awesome Friends | 2025–present | 1 | 20 | Marvel Studios Animation / Atomic Cartoons | Disney Channel (Disney Jr. block) / Disney Jr./ YouTube (Disney Jr. / Marvel HQ channel) / Disney+ | |

=== Lego series ===
| Year | Title | Production studio(s) | Notes |
|---|---|---|---|
| 2020 | Lego Marvel Avengers: Climate Conundrum | The Lego Group | Released on YouTube |
| 2025 | Lego Marvel Avengers: Strange Tails | Atomic Cartoons | Released on Disney+ |

=== Television blocks ===
| Title | Year | Production company(s) | Network | Notes / Ref(s) |
|---|---|---|---|---|
| Marvel Action Universe | 1988–1991 | New World Television / Marvel Productions | Syndication | |
| The Marvel Action Hour | 1994–1996 | Genesis Entertainment | Syndication | |

== See also ==
- List of films based on Marvel Comics publications
- List of radio dramas based on Marvel Comics publications
- List of television series based on DC Comics publications
- Marvel Studios
- Marvel Television
- Marvel Animation
- Marvel Productions
- Marvel Knights
- Marvel Rising
- Spider-Man in television
- X-Men in television
- Marvel Comics Video Library
- List of Marvel Cinematic Universe television series (Marvel Television)
- List of Marvel Cinematic Universe television series (Marvel Studios)
- List of unproduced television projects based on Marvel Comics
- List of video games based on comics
