= Superhero comics =

Genre of American comic books

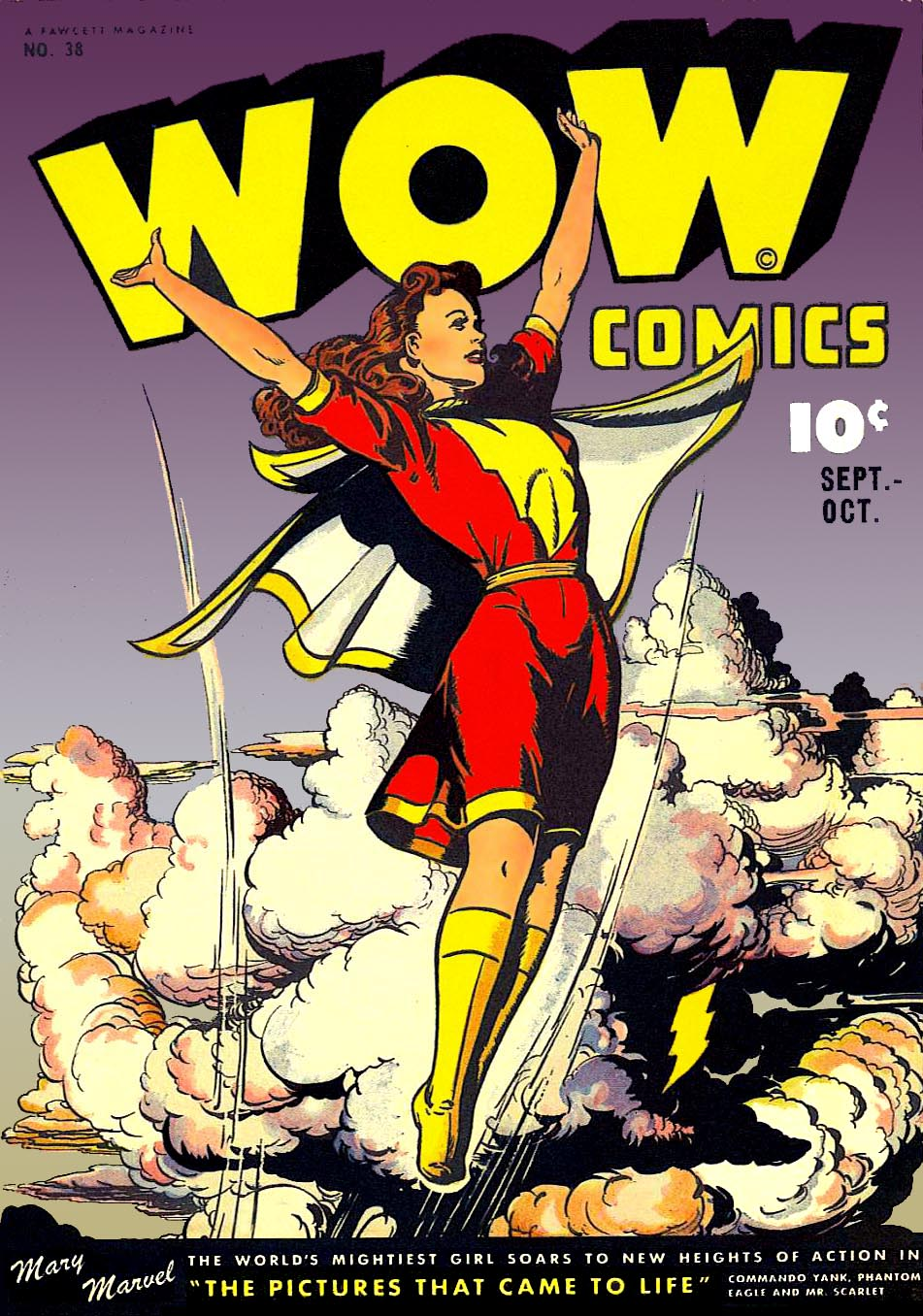
- Cover of Wow Comics 38 (September/October 1941)
- Authors: Jack Kirby; Stan Lee; Dennis O'Neil; Alan Moore; Steve Ditko
- Publishers: DC Comics; Marvel Comics; Image Comics; Valiant Comics; Charlton Comics
- Publications: Superman; Batman; The Amazing Spider-Man; Lynx-Man; Watchmen
- Series: The Death of Superman; Gods and Mortals; Days of Future Past; The Night Gwen Stacy Died; Snowbirds Don't Fly

Related genres
- Comic book death; Magical girl; Superpower; Tokusatsu; Women in Refrigerators

Superhero comics is one of the most common genres of American comic books. The genre rose to prominence in the 1930s and became extremely popular in the 1940s. It has remained the dominant form of comic book in North America since the 1960s. Superhero comics feature stories about superheroes and the universes which these characters inhabit.

Beginning with the introduction of Superman in 1938 in Action Comics #1 (an anthology of adventure features) comic books devoted to superheroes (heroic people with extraordinary or superhuman abilities and skills, or god-like powers and attributes) ballooned into a widespread genre, coincident with the beginnings of World War II and the end of the Great Depression.

== Precursors ==
In comics format, superpowered and costumed heroes like Popeye and The Phantom had appeared in newspaper comic strips for several years prior to Superman. The first fully-masked hero The Clock first appeared in the comic book Funny Pages #6 (Nov. 1936).

== History ==
=== The Golden Age (c. 1938 – c. 1950) ===
In the Great Depression and World War II era, the first superhero comics appeared, the most popular being Superman, Batman, Captain Marvel, Wonder Woman and Captain America.

=== Decline ===
After World War II superhero comic books gradually declined in popularity. Their sales were hindered in part by the publication of Fredric Wertham's book Seduction of the Innocent, which posited comic books as having a harmful effect on the minds of children reading them, and the investigations of The Senate Subcommittee hearings on juvenile delinquency. By 1954 only three superheroes still had their own titles; Superman and Batman, who also costarred in World's Finest Comics, and Wonder Woman.

=== The Silver Age (c. 1956 – c. 1970) ===
Beginning in the 1950s, DC under the editorship of Julius Schwartz (himself had roots in the science fiction fandom) began publishing revised versions of their 1940s superhero characters such as The Flash and Green Lantern with more of a science fiction focus. Marvel Comics followed suit in the 1960s, introducing characters such as Spider-Man, the Fantastic Four, the Hulk, Thor, the X-Men and Iron Man who featured more complex personalities which had more dramatic potential.

=== The Bronze Age (c. 1970 – c. 1985) ===
Superhero comics became much more political and dealt with social issues as in the short-lived run of Green Lantern/Green Arrow by Denny O'Neil and Neal Adams and the Captain America story arc of the superhero's political disillusionment by Steve Englehart. This was eventually supplanted by more sophisticated character driven titles of The Uncanny X-Men by Chris Claremont and John Byrne for Marvel and The New Teen Titans by Marv Wolfman and George Pérez for DC. Anti-hero themes became popular with appearances of the Punisher, Wolverine, Ghost Rider and a 1980s revival of Daredevil by Frank Miller.

=== The Modern Age (c. 1985 – present) ===
Superhero Comics became darker with the release of landmark deconstructive works such as Watchmen and The Dark Knight Returns, which led to many imitations. The late 80s to early 90s saw the rise of successful new characters including the Teenage Mutant Ninja Turtles and the anti-hero Spawn which were predominantly creator owned as opposed to Marvel and DC's which were corporate owned. The comic book mini series Kingdom Come brought an end to the popularity of the anti-hero and encouraged instead a reconstruction of the genre with superhero characters that endeavored to combine artistic and literary sophistication with idealism.

== See also ==
- Superhero film
- List of comic book and superhero podcasts
