= X-Reads Podcast =

Podcast about the X-Men

X-Reads: An X-Men Experience
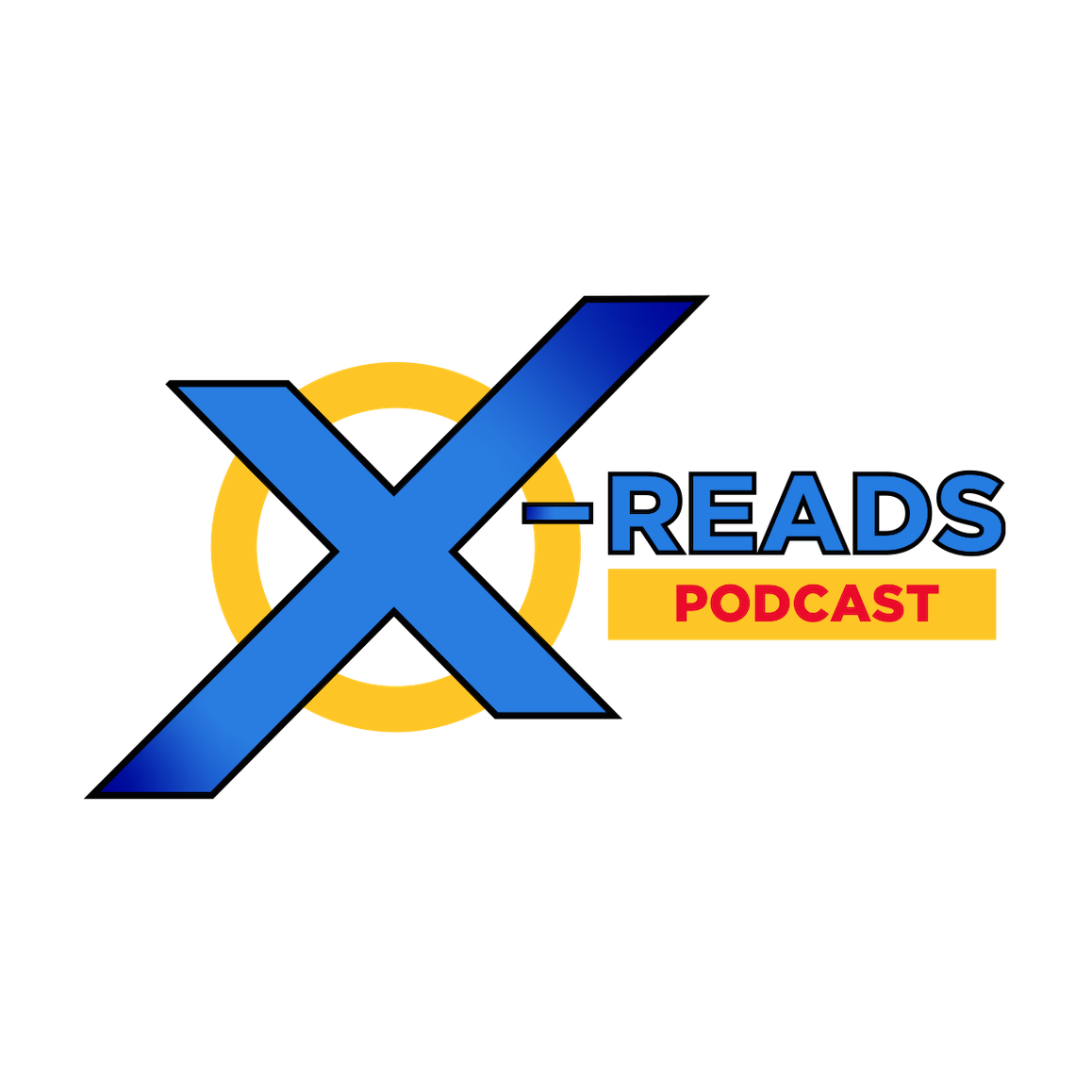
- X-Reads Podcast Official Logo
- Language: American English

Cast and voices
- Hosted by: Chandler Poling & Chris Riley

Publication
- No. of episodes: 136 (as of January 2025)

X-Reads is a podcast co-hosted by Chandler Poling & Chris Riley, about classic issues of X-Men comic books from different eras of the series. Guests on the show have included the writers and artists Chris Claremont, Bill Sienkiewicz, Fabian Nicieza, Anne Nocenti, and several of the voice actors from X-Men: The Animated Series and X-Men '97.

== History ==
Launched during San Diego Comic-Con weekend in 2019, the show's format consists of recapping single issues of comics in the X-Men Universe, page by page, often including the vintage ads of the era. Their first guest appearance was Lenore Zann, the voice of Rogue from X-Men: The Animated Series and now currently voicing the character in X-Men '97. Additional talent from the animated shows later appeared on the podcast including Cal Dodd (Wolverine), Kari Walhgren (Emma Frost), Chris Britton (Mr. Sinister), Matthew Waterson (Magneto), and Isaac Robinson-Smith (Bishop). As of January 2025 the podcast was ranked fifth in the "15 Best X-Men (Comics) Podcasts" by Feedspot.

In 2024 Poling and Riley turned the podcast into a virtual and later live annual event called the "X-Men Fandom Panel" held at WonderCon and San Diego Comic-Con, for X-Mens fans and professionals. Guests on the panel have include Shawn Ashmore, Finola Hughes, Gerry Duggan and George Buza.

During the COVID-19 pandemic, X-Reads launched a fundraiser in partnership with other podcasts to raise money for local comic book shops affected by the lock-down. This was done through BINC's Comicbook United Fund, which supplied support to shop owners in need.

In 2021, Poling and Riley hosted a virtual red carpet ceremony for the fictional Hellfire Gala, with Nerdist and Marvel Comics. The Hellfire Gala took place in comics from 2021 to 2023 and featured original fashion designs on superheroes, inspired by the Met Gala in New York City. Featured on the live stream were comic creators, cosplayers and celebrities including by Emma Dumont (now Nick Dumont), Kari Wahlgren, Russell Dauterman, Zeb Wells, Jordan D White, Dax ExclamationPoint, and fashion designer Samantha Rei.

In January 2022, X-Reads Podcast was brought into the AIPT Comics podcast network.

== Episodes ==
As of January 2025 the podcast has aired 135 episodes, and posts bi-weekly on the first and third Wednesdays of the month.

== Special guests ==
Episode Number	Special Guest	Issue Covered
9	Lenore Zann	Uncanny X-Men 173
18	Casper Van Dien, Jenny Van Dien	Uncanny X-Men 260
32	Dax ExclamationPoint	Uncanny X-Men 312
42	Fabian Nicieza	X-Men 100
43	Kari Wahlgren	New X-Men 116
44	Anne Nocenti	Longshot 3
48	Karen David	X-Men Fairy Tales 4
49	Bryan Konietzko	Havok & Wolverine Meltdown 1
50	Bill Sienkiewicz	New Mutants 21
53	Anthony Oliveira	X-Men 46
56	Jack Plotnick	Excalibur 32
59	Jordan D White	Excalibur 50
60	Bob Quinn	New X-Men 38
62	Cal Dodd	Wolverine 1
Bonus	Leah Williams	The Trail of Magneto 1–5
69	Steve Orlando	X-Men 79
71	Eric & Julia Lewald	X-Men Adventures 1
72	Steve Foxe	X-Men 98
73	Steven E Gordon	X-Men Children of the Atom 1
74	David Nakayama	Generation X 1
76	Josh Trujillo, Terry Blas, Carrie Harris	All-New X-Men 40
78	Rod Reis	New X-Men 18
84	Chris Britton	X-Factor 75
85	Terri Hawkes	Sailor Moon 30th Anniversary
86	Kieron Gillen	Uncanny X-Men 209
88	Fabian Nicieza (second appearance)	X-Men 25
89	Larry Hama	Wolverine 75
92	Lucas Werneck	New X-Men 121
96	Ryan Penagos	Uncanny X-Men 297
97	Stephanie Williams	X-Men Unlimited 7
98	Neil Kleid	X-Men: Emperor Vulcan 1
99	Alex Segura	Uncanny X-Men 237
100	Chris Claremont	Wolverine & Kitty Pryde Miniseries
113	Erica Schultz	X-23: Deadly Regenesis 1
121	Matthew Waterson	Uncanny X-Men 200
122	Steve Foxe (second appearance)	X-Men '97 1
124	Isaac Robinson-Smith	Uncanny X-Men 283
127	Gui Agustini, Christine Uhebe	New Mutants 7
132	Murewa Ayodele	Storm 1
