= Marvel Entertainment =

American entertainment company (1998–2023)

Marvel Entertainment, LLC
- Final logo, used from 2012 to 2023 (Note: Logo continued to be used for Marvel Entertainment's former units until 2024)

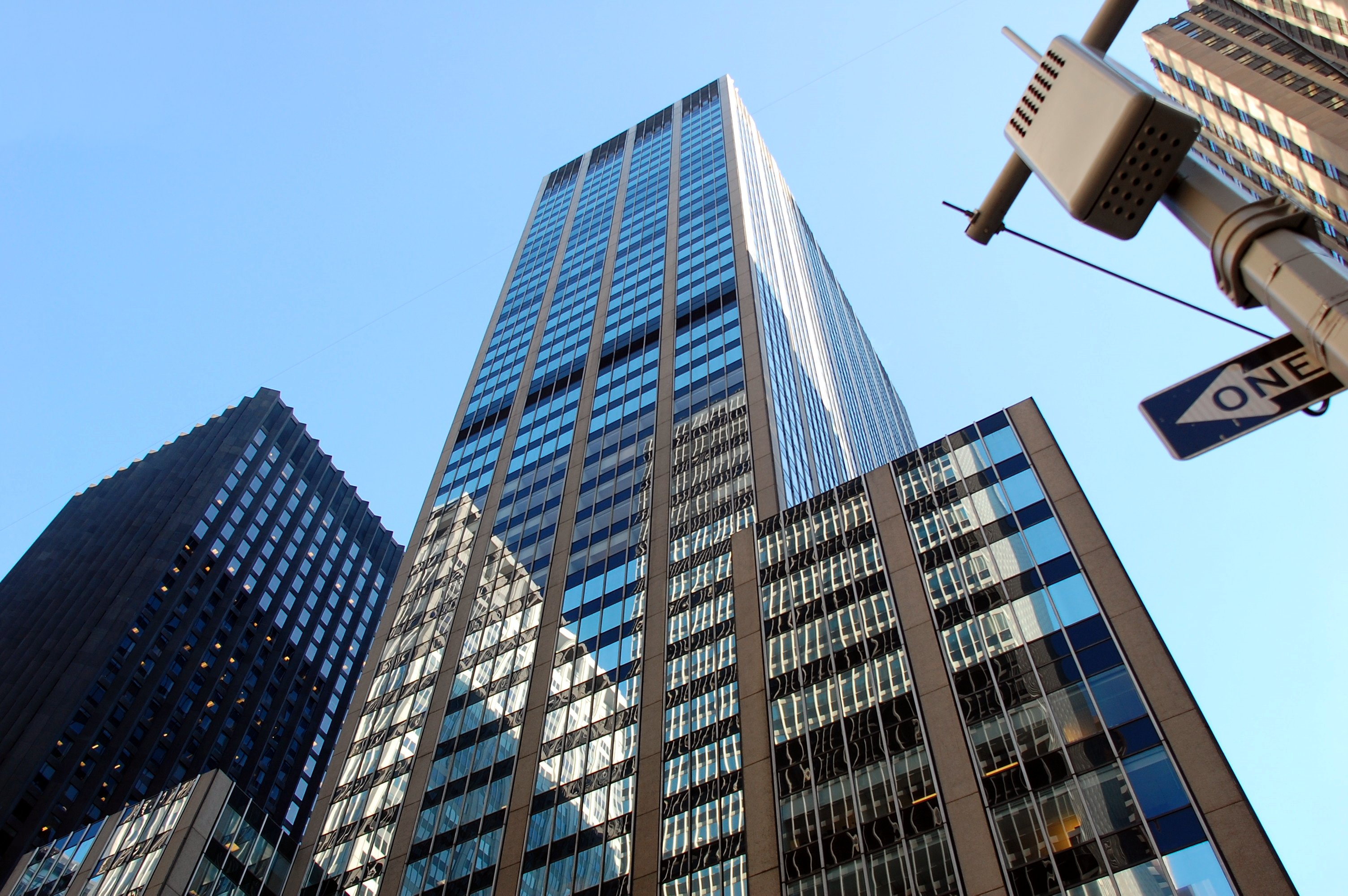
- Headquarters in 1290 Avenue of the Americas, New York
- Formerly: Marvel Enterprises, Inc. (1998–2005); Marvel Entertainment, Inc. (2005–2009)
- Type: Subsidiary
- Traded as: NYSE: MVL (1998–2009)
- Industry: Entertainment
- Genre: Superhero fiction
- Predecessors: Toy Biz; Marvel Entertainment Group
- Founded: June 2, 1998; 28 years ago
- Fate: Folded into the Walt Disney Company; still exists as a brand label.
- Successor: Disney Entertainment (Media Units); Disney Publishing Worldwide (Book Units); Disney Games Group (Game Units)
- Headquarters: 1290 Avenue of the Americas, New York City, United States
- Area served: Worldwide
- Key people: Kevin Feige (CCO); Dan Buckley (president)
- Products: Books; Comics; Podcasts; Video games; Webcasts
- Services: Licensing
- Parent: The Walt Disney Company (2009–2023)
- Divisions: Marvel Comics; Marvel Games; Marvel New Media
- Subsidiaries: Iron Works Productions; Marvel Characters; Marvel Unlimited
- Website: marvel.com

Marvel Entertainment, LLC (formerly Marvel Entertainment, Inc. and Marvel Enterprises, Inc.) was an American entertainment company and subsidiary of the Walt Disney Company, headquartered in New York City. Founded on June 2, 1998, through the merger of Marvel Entertainment Group and Toy Biz, the company operated until March 29, 2023, when its remaining businesses were absorbed into Disney's other divisions.

Marvel Entertainment oversaw a portfolio of businesses centered on Marvel Comics, including comic book publishing, character licensing, merchandising, and consumer products. The company also expanded into film and television production, helping establish the foundations of the Marvel Cinematic Universe (MCU) through Marvel Studios and its early involvement in films and television series based on Marvel characters.

On December 31, 2009, Disney completed its acquisition of Marvel Entertainment for approximately US$4 billion, after which Marvel operated as a limited liability company (LLC). Following the transfer of Marvel Studios to Walt Disney Studios in 2015, Marvel Entertainment's remaining operations, particularly comic book publishing, licensing, and consumer products, were primarily reported under Disney's consumer products business.

Throughout its history, Marvel maintained licensing agreements and partnerships with third parties for the use of its characters and intellectual properties across film, television, consumer products, and theme parks. These included film rights held by Sony Pictures through Columbia Pictures for Spider-Man, as well as theme park agreements with Universal Destinations & Experiences for certain Marvel characters at Islands of Adventure and IMG Worlds of Adventure. Marvel characters also became increasingly prominent at Disney Parks around the world, subject to existing licensing restrictions and agreements with third-party operators.

On March 29, 2023, Disney dissolved Marvel Entertainment as a standalone business unit as part of a broader company restructuring, integrating its remaining operations into other divisions and dismissing its chairman, Ike Perlmutter.

== History ==
=== Marvel Entertainment Group ===
Marvel Property, Inc.
- Formerly: Marvel Entertainment Group, Inc.
- Type: Subsidiary
- Traded as: NYSE: MRV
- Predecessor: Marvel Comics Group; Cadence Industries
- Founded: December 2, 1986; 39 years ago
- Defunct: June 2, 1998; 28 years ago
- Fate: Business operations merged with Toy Biz and renamed as Marvel Enterprises
- Products: Animated series; Books; Comics
- Parent: Cadence Industries (1986); New World Pictures (1986–89); Andrews Group (1989–93); Marvel Holdings, Inc. (1994–97); Icahn Enterprises (1997)
- Divisions: Marvel Films (1993–96); Marvel Enterprises (1997–98)
- Subsidiaries: Marvel Productions (1986–89); Fleer (1992–98); ToyBiz (1993–98); Heroes World Distribution (1994–97); Panini (1994–98); SkyBox International (1995–98); Marvel Studios (1996–98)
- Footnotes; Financials as of December 31, 1997.

Marvel Entertainment Group, Inc. (a.k.a. Marvel), incorporated on December 2, 1986, and included Marvel Comics and Marvel Productions. That year, it was sold to New World Entertainment Ltd as part of the liquidation of Cadence Industries. On January 6, 1989, Ronald Perelman's MacAndrews & Forbes Holdings bought Marvel from New World for $82.5 million. The deal did not include Marvel Productions, which was folded into New World's television and movie business.

"It is a mini-Disney in terms of intellectual property," said Perelman. "Disney's got much more highly recognized characters and softer characters, whereas our characters are termed action heroes. But at Marvel we are now in the business of the creation and marketing of characters."

==== Public offering and acquisition ====
Marvel made an initial public offering of 40% of the stock (ticker symbol NYSE:MRV) on July 15, 1991, giving $40 million from the proceeds to Andrews Group, Marvel's then direct parent corporation within MacAndrews & Forbes Holdings.

In the early 1990s, Marvel began expanding through acquisitions and the formation of new divisions. It purchased the trading card company Fleer on July 24, 1992. On April 30, 1993, Marvel acquired 46% of ToyBiz, which gave the company the rights to make Marvel toys. The Andrews Group named Avi Arad of ToyBiz as the president and CEO of the Marvel Films division.

In 1993 and 1994, Marvel's holding companies, Marvel Holdings, Inc. and Marvel Parent Holdings, Inc., were formed between it and Andrews Group. The companies issued over half a billion dollars in bonds under the direction of Perelman, which was passed up in dividends to Perelman's group of companies. Later on, Marvel and Acclaim Entertainment teamed up to provide a video game license in the early 1990s, which eventually formed into a joint label, Marvel Software in 1994. On July 5, 1994, Marvel acquired Panini Group, an Italian sticker-maker, followed by Malibu Comics on November 3 and Heroes World Distribution, a regional distributor to comic-book shops, in December. On March 10, 1995, it acquired trading card company SkyBox International with the acquisition being fully completed later in May.

Marvel's attempt to distribute its products directly led to a decrease in sales and aggravated the losses which Marvel suffered when the comic book bubble popped, the 1994 Major League Baseball strike massacred the profits of the Fleer unit, and Panini, whose revenue depended largely on Disney licensing, was hobbled by poor Disney showings at the box office. A minority of dissidents maintain no bubble existed.

==== Bankruptcy and Marvel Studios ====
In late 1995, Marvel reported its first annual loss under Perelman, which was attributed mainly to the company's large size and a shrinking market. On January 4, 1996, Marvel laid off 275 employees.

In late 1996, Perelman proposed a plan to save Marvel in which the company would merge with Toy Biz after Perelman spent $350 million for the Toy Biz shares that he did not already own. He would then receive newly issued Marvel shares to maintain his 80% stake.

Separately, in July 1996, Marvel filed with the U.S. Securities and Exchange Commission to raise money to create a private entity called Marvel Studios. Much of the money to create Marvel Studios came from the sale of Toy Biz stock.

On December 27, 1996, the Marvel group of companies filed for Chapter 11 bankruptcy protection. At this time, Carl Icahn, an American businessman and investor, began buying Marvel's bonds at 20% of their value and moved to block Perelman's plan. In February 1997, Icahn won the bankruptcy court's approval to take control of the company's stock. Later, in June 1997, Icahn won the right to replace Marvel's board, including Perelman.

In December 1997, during the post-bankruptcy reorganization phase, Toy Biz came to an agreement to purchase Marvel from the banks. In December 1997, the bankruptcy court appointed a trustee to oversee the company in place of Icahn. In April 1998, while the legal battle continued, the NYSE delisted Marvel stock.

In August 2008, former company head Ronald Perelman paid $80 million to settle a lawsuit accusing him of helping divert $553.5 million in notes when he controlled the company.

=== Marvel Enterprises ===
Marvel logo used from 2000 to 2012

ToyBiz and Marvel Entertainment Group were merged into Marvel Enterprises to bring it out of bankruptcy on June 2, 1998. In February 1999, Fleer/Skybox was sold to a corporation owned by Alex and Roger Grass, a father and son, for US$30 million.

Later, the rights to names like "Spider-Man" were being challenged. Toy Biz hired an attorney to review its license agreement. Los Angeles patent attorney Carole E. Handler found a legal loophole in the licensing of the Marvel name and was successful in reclaiming Marvel Enterprises' movie rights to its character Spider-Man.

Marvel Enterprises organized itself into four major units, Marvel Studios, Toy Biz, Licensing and Publishing, while in November 1999 adding Marvel Characters Group to manage Marvel's IP and oversee marketing. Marvel named its Marvel New Media president, Steve Milo, in November 2000 to oversee its website.

In 2003, Bill Stine purchased back Quest Aerospace, a 1995 Toy Biz acquisition, from Marvel. In summer 2003, Marvel placed an offer for Artisan Entertainment, but it was eventually acquired by Lions Gate Entertainment. A new unit, Marvel International, was set up in London under a president, Bruno Maglione, to extend the company's operation and presence in major overseas markets in November 2003. In December 2003, Marvel Entertainment acquired Cover Concepts from Hearst Communications, Inc. In November 2004, Marvel consolidated its children's sleepwear-apparel licensing business with American Marketing Enterprises, Inc.

In November 2004, the corporation sued South Korea-based NCSoft Corp. and San Jose, California-based Cryptic Studios Inc. over possible trademark infringement in their City of Heroes massive multiplayer online game. Marvel settled a film-royalties lawsuit in April 2005 with its former editor-in-chief, publisher and creator, Stan Lee, paying him $10 million and negotiating an end to his royalties.

=== Marvel Entertainment ===
In September 2005, Marvel Enterprises changed its name to Marvel Entertainment to reflect the corporation's expansion into financing its own movie slate.

In 2007, several Stan Lee Media related groups filed lawsuits against Marvel Entertainment for $1 billion and for Lee's Marvel creations in multiple states, most of which have been dismissed. Additionally, a lawsuit over ownership of the character Ghost Rider was filed on March 30, 2007, by Gary Friedrich and Gary Friedrich Enterprises, Inc.

==== Disney subsidiary (2009–2023) ====
On August 31, 2009, the Walt Disney Company announced a deal to acquire Marvel Entertainment for $4 billion, with Marvel shareholders to receive $30 and approximately 0.745 Disney shares for each share of Marvel they own. Shareholders from both companies approved the deal on December 31, 2009; it was finalised on the same day. The company was delisted from the New York Stock Exchange under its ticker symbol (MVL), due to the closing of the deal.

On June 2, 2010, Marvel announced that it promoted Joe Quesada to chief creative officer of Marvel Entertainment. In June 2010, Marvel set up a television division headed by Jeph Loeb as executive vice president. Three months later, Smith & Tinker licensed from Marvel the character rights for a superhero digital collectible game for Facebook and Apple's mobile platform. On October 1, 2010, Marvel moved its offices to a 60,000-square-foot (5,600 m^{2}) suite at 135 W. 50th Street, New York City, under a nine-year sublease contract.

Stan Lee Media's lawsuit against Marvel was dismissed again in February 2011.

In March 2013, Feld Entertainment agreed with Marvel to produce a Marvel Character-based live arena show. Marvel was also launching a new pop culture and lifestyle web show, "Earth's Mightiest Show". On August 22, 2013, Marvel Entertainment announced that it was working with Hero Ventures on The Marvel Experience, a traveling production/attraction. In April 2014, Hong Kong Disneyland announced the construction of Iron Man Experience, the first Marvel ride at any Disney theme park. It opened in 2017 and was built on a location in the park's Tomorrowland.

On September 16, 2009, the Jack Kirby estate served notices of termination to Walt Disney Studios, 20th Century Fox, Universal Pictures, Paramount Pictures, and Sony Pictures to attempt to gain control of various Silver Age Marvel characters. Marvel sought to invalidate those claims. In mid-March 2010 Kirby's estate "sued Marvel to terminate copyrights and gain profits from [Kirby's] comic creations." In July 2011, the United States District Court for the Southern District of New York issued a summary judgment in favor of Marvel, which was affirmed in August 2013 by the United States Court of Appeals for the Second Circuit. The Kirby estate filed a petition on March 21, 2014, for a review of the case by the Supreme Court of the United States, but a settlement was reached on September 26, 2014, and the family requested that the petition be dismissed.

Marvel president of television, publishing and brand Dan Buckley was promoted to Marvel Entertainment president in January 2017 adding games, global brand management and the franchise groups to his current responsibilities. In October 2017, Ron Richards began working at Marvel Entertainment as vice president and Managing Editor of New Media. Marvel New Media expanded into a new field with the development of a scripted podcast series, Wolverine: The Long Night, announced on December 5, 2017. Marvel and SiriusXM announced on October 22, 2019, a multi-year deal for scripted and unscripted podcast series and themed live events.

Marvel Entertainment announced a new pre-school franchise, Marvel Super Hero Adventures, in September 2017 consisting of a short-form animated series along with publishing and merchandise during "Marvel Mania" October. On December 7, 2017, Marvel announced its Marvel Rising franchise focusing on new characters as youngsters starting with animation in 2018. Marvel Comics is expected to publish material for Marvel Rising, but delayed any announcement on their material.

In October 2019, Marvel Studios head Kevin Feige was named Marvel's Chief Creative Officer, overseeing all the creative affairs within Marvel Entertainment in addition to Marvel Studios. Under the structure, Marvel Television and Marvel Family Entertainment (animation) moved to Marvel Studios, with Marvel Entertainment president Dan Buckley reporting to Feige. With the December 2019 announcement of folding of Marvel Television into Marvel Studios came the dismissal of executives of vice president level and above in television and animation under Feige, plus the removal of Brian Crosby as creative director of Themed Entertainment for Marvel Entertainment.

On March 29, 2023, Disney laid off Marvel Entertainment's chairman Isaac Perlmutter and the subsidiary's units were folded into Disney's other divisions. In April 2024, Marvel Entertainment experienced layoffs due to efficiencies from integrating the company into Marvel Studios and other Disney departments following the exit of Isaac Perlmutter in March 2023.

== Units ==
=== Final ===
- Marvel Custom Solutions, customized comic books
- Marvel Brands, LLC
- Marvel Unlimited, digital reading service
- Marvel Games, the division used for video game promotion and licensing of Marvel intellectual properties to video game publishers, transferred to Disney Interactive
- Cover Concepts, Inc.
- Marvel Worldwide, Inc., publisher of Marvel Comics
  - Marvel Comics, transferred to Disney Publishing Worldwide
    - Marvel Knights, standalone imprint
    - Icon Comics, defunct since 2017
    - Infinite Comics, defunct since 2017
    - Timely Comics, imprint
    - Marvel MAX, adult-only imprint
  - Marvel Press, imprint of Marvel Comics jointly published with Disney Books

==== Intellectual property holding companies ====
- Iron Works Productions LLC, movie rights subsidiary
- Incredible Productions LLC (Delaware), movie rights subsidiary
- Marvel Characters, Inc.: subsidiary holding general rights of all Marvel Comics characters
  - MVL Rights, LLC: subsidiary holding Marvel Comics characters' movie rights (film slate contracted with MVL Film Finance LLC)
  - MVL Film Finance LLC: holder of Marvel's Movie debt and theatrical film rights to the ten characters as collateral.
- Marvel Characters B.V. (The Netherlands)
- Marvel International Character Holdings LLC (Delaware)
- Marvel Property, Inc. (Delaware) incorporated February 12, 1986 (formerly Marvel Entertainment Group, Inc.)
- Marvel Entertainment International Limited (United Kingdom)
- Marvel Property, Inc. (Delaware)
- Marvel Internet Productions LLC (Delaware)
- Marvel Toys Limited (Hong Kong)
- MRV, Inc. (Delaware)
  - Iron Works Productions LLC: subsidiary holding debt to finance the Iron Man films
  - Incredible Productions LLC (Delaware): subsidiary holding debt to finance the Incredible Hulk films
  - MVL Iron Works Productions Canada, Inc. (Province of Ontario)
  - MVL Incredible Productions Canada, Inc. (Province of Ontario)
  - Asgard Productions LLC (Delaware): subsidiary holding debt to finance the Thor films.
  - Green Guy Toons LLC (Delaware): subsidiary holding debt to finance the Hulk animated shows and animated films.
  - Squad Productions LLC (Delaware)

==== Marvel New Media ====
Marvel New Media
- Type: Division
- Headquarters: New York City, United States
- Key people: Ryan Penagos (Vice President and Creative Executive); Lorraine Cink (Senior Creative Producer)
- Products: Podcasts; Websites; Webcast
- Parent: Disney Interactive

Marvel New Media (also called Marvel Digital) is a unit of the Walt Disney Company consisting of the company's website, web series, and podcast. Digital shows under New Media are THWIP! The Big Marvel Show, The Marvel Minute, Marvel LIVE! and Marvel Top 10.

In October 2017, Ron Richards began working at Marvel Entertainment as vice president and Managing Editor of New Media, while Marvel Digital freelance on-air host Lorraine Cink was hired as Senior Creative Producer. Marvel New Media expanded into a new field with the development of a scripted podcast series, Wolverine: The Long Night, announced on December 5, 2017.

On April 7, 2018, at the Chicago Comic and Entertainment Expo, Marvel New Media announced its new slate. Marvel named Shane Rahmani as senior vice president and general manager of new media in March 2019. On April 10, 2019, a slate of 10 unscripted series including two from Marvel New Media was revealed for Disney+. After Rahmani left for Google, podcast host Ryan Penagos became vice president and creative executive for the organization.

Marvel and SiriusXM announced on October 22, 2019, a multi-year deal for multiple scripted and unscripted podcast series for 2020 debuts. The first four scripted series feature Black Widow, Hawkeye, Star-Lord, and Wolverine, which is planned to lead to a fifth series featuring all four characters. The slate's unscripted podcasts would consist of talk shows, Marvel's history via a modern-day pop cultural view, and popular Marvel franchises-focused podcasts.

In early 2023, as part of cost-cutting moves by its parent company Disney, the in-house audio production unit responsible for Marvel podcasts was cut from six to three people. The move also marked the end of the co-production agreement with SiriusXM, making Wastelanders the final series produced under the partnership.

===== Webcasts =====
- Earth's Mightiest Show (March 2018–) A weekly variety web series focusing on fandom and Marvel culture
- Eat the Universe
- Marvel LIVE!
- The Marvel Minute
- Marvel Top 10 (2017–)
- Marvel's Hero Project (November 12, 2019 – March 20, 2020) produced with Maggievision Productions for Disney+; documents youngsters affecting their local communities
- Marvel's 616 (November 20, 2020) produced with Supper Club for Disney+; anthology documentary series features the intersection between Marvel's stories, characters, and creators and the real world
- Marvel's Storyboards (July 23, 2020 – December 15, 2020) produced with BFD Productions; hosted by Joe Quesada, Marvel Entertainment's then-creative director, where he interviews guests from various backgrounds to get to know their story with an expected around a dozen 10 to 15 minutes long episodes.
- This Week in Marvel (relaunch)
- THWIP! The Big Marvel Show
- Women of Marvel (June 2014–?; relaunched February 2018–) a female point of view of the comic industry

===== Documentary =====
- Marvel's Behind the Mask (February 12, 2021), documentary special produced with Tarmac Creative for Disney+.

===== Podcasts =====
====== Interview or unscripted ======
Title	Seasons	Episodes	Original airing	Production company	Ref.
Women of Marvel	1	286	2014	Marvel New Media	
Marvel's Voices	5	89	2018	Marvel New Media	
Marvel's Declassified	1	12	2020	Marvel New Media / SiriusXM	
Marvel/Method	1	8	2021	Marvel New Media / SiriusXM	
The History of Marvel Comics: Black Panther	1	6	2022	Marvel New Media / SiriusXM	
The Official Marvel Podcast	1	21	2024	—N/a	

====== Drama ======
Title	Seasons	Episodes	Original airing	Production company	Ref.
Wolverine: The Long Night	1	10	2018	Marvel New Media / Stitcher	
Wolverine: The Lost Trail	1	10	2019	Marvel New Media / Stitcher	
Marvels	1	10	2019	Marvel New Media / Stitcher	
Wolverine: La Larga Noche	1	10	2021	Marvel New Media / SiriusXM	
Marvel's Wastelanders: Star-Lord	1	10	2021	Marvel New Media / SiriusXM	
Marvel's Wastelanders: Hawkeye	1	10	2021	Marvel New Media / SiriusXM	
Marvel's Wastelanders: Black Widow	1	10	2022	Marvel New Media / SiriusXM	
Marvel's Squirrel Girl: The Unbeatable Radio Show!	1	6	2022	Marvel New Media / SiriusXM	
Marvel's Wastelanders: Wolverine	1	10	2022	Marvel New Media / SiriusXM	
Marvel's Wastelanders: Doom	1	10	2022	Marvel New Media / SiriusXM	
Marvel's Wastelanders	1	10	2022	Marvel New Media / SiriusXM	

=== Former ===
- Marvel Toys, formerly "Toy Biz" (1984–2007)
- Marvel Merchandising department/Heroes World Distribution Co. (early 1970s–1975/1994–1996)
- Malibu Comics (1994–1997)
- Marvel Books division (c.1985)
- Marvel Comics Ltd. (1972–1995; UK subsidiary)
- Marvel Studios, LLC (1996–2015), formerly Marvel Films (1993–1996), a film and television production company; now a subsidiary of The Walt Disney Studios
  - Marvel Films Animation – animation subdivision (1994–1997)
  - Marvel Film Productions LLC (Delaware)
  - MVL Development LLC (Delaware) rights subsidiary
- Marvel Television, Inc. (2010–2019) now a division of Marvel Studios.
  - Marvel Animation, LLC. (2008–2020) Subsidiary charged with oversight of Marvel's animation productions.
    - MLG Productions (2006–2011), Marvel & Lionsgate's subsidiary group for Marvel Animated Features
    - Marvel Animation Studios (2012–2020)
- Marvel Mania Restaurant (Marvel Restaurant Venture Corp.)
- Marvel Enterprise division
  - Marvel Interactive
    - Online Entertainment (Marvel Zone)
    - Software Publishing
  - Fleer Corporation
    - Panini Group: Italian sticker manufacturer
  - SkyBox International
- Marvel Music Groups (1981–1989) music publishing subsidiary
- Marvel Productions (1981–1989)
- Mighty Marvel Music Corporation (1981–1989) music publishing subsidiary
- Spider-Man Merchandising, L.P. (2001–2013) A joint venture of Marvel and Sony Pictures Consumer Products Inc. that owned the rights to Spider-Man movie related licensed products.
- Welsh Publishing Group: children's magazine publisher

== Executives ==
=== Chairmen ===
- Ronald O. Perelman (January 6, 1989 – October 23, 1996)
- Scott M. Sassa (October 23, 1996 – June 20, 1997)
- Morton E. Handel (October 1, 1998 – December 31, 2009)
- Isaac Perlmutter (April 1993 – March 1995; January 1, 2017 – March 29, 2023)

=== Vice Chairmen ===
- Terry Stewart (March 1995 – December 1995)
- Isaac Perlmutter (November 30, 2001 – December 31, 2009)
- Peter Cuneo (June 17, 2003 – December 31, 2009)

=== CEOs ===
- William C. Bevins Jr. (1991 – October 23, 1996)
- Scott M. Sassa (October 23, 1996 – June 20, 1997)
- Joseph Calamari (June 23, 1997 – October 1, 1998)
- Joseph Ahearn (October 1, 1998 – November 25, 1998)
- Eric Ellenbogen (November 25, 1998 – July 20, 1999)
- F. Peter Cuneo (July 20, 1999 – December 31, 2002)
- Allen S. Lipson (January 1, 2003 – December 31, 2004)

Office of the Chief Executive

- Isaac Perlmutter (January 1, 2005 – December 31, 2016)
- Executive Vice Presidents:
  - Alan Fine (April 2009 – ?)
  - John Turitzin (September 2006 – March 29, 2023)
  - David Maisel (September 2006 – December 31, 2009)

=== Presidents ===
- Stan Lee (1972–1973)
- Al Landau (1973–1975)
- Jim Galton (1975–1991)
- Terry Stewart (1992–1993)
- Rick Ungar (? – November 1993)
- Avi Arad (November 1993 – ?)
- Bruce Stein (? – November 1994)
- William C. Bevins Jr. (November 1994 – ?)
- Terry Stewart (May 1995)
- Jerry Calabrese (May 1995 – mid 1996; October 1998 – November 1998)
- Scott C. Marden (interim) (Mid 1996 – September 1996)
- David Schreff (September 1996 – ?)
- Joseph Calamari (? – October 1998)
- Eric Ellenbogen (November 1998 – July 1999)
- F. Peter Cuneo (July 1999 – January 1, 2003)
- Allen Lipson (January 1, 2003 – January 1, 2005)
- Alan Fine (2009–2015) also, chair of Marvel's Creative Committee
- Dan Buckley (January 2017 – present)

=== Others ===
- Bill Jemas, president of publishing and consumer products (February 2000 – October 2010)
- Bruno Maglione, president of Marvel International, November 2003
- Joe Quesada, chief creative officer (2010–2019), Creative Director (2019–2022)
- Kevin Feige, chief creative officer, Marvel (2019–present)
- Bill Jemas, chief operating officer (January 2002 – October 2010), chief marketing officer (October 2010 – late 2013)
- Guy Karyo, executive vice president of operations and chief information officer (October 2010)
- Jeph Loeb, EVP and head of Marvel Television (2010–2019)

== Productions ==
=== Television ===
==== Live-action ====
Series	Aired	Production	Network(s)	Notes
Blade: The Series	2006	Phantom Four and New Line Television	Spike	
Agents of S.H.I.E.L.D.	2013–2020	ABC Studios, Marvel Television, and Mutant Enemy Productions	ABC	
Agent Carter	2015–16	ABC Studios, Marvel Television, and Fazekas & Butters	ABC	
Daredevil	2015–2018	ABC Studios, Marvel Television, DeKnight Productions (season 1), and Goddard Textiles	Netflix	
Jessica Jones	2015–2019	ABC Studios, Marvel Television, and Tall Girls Productions	Netflix	
Luke Cage	2016–2018	ABC Studios and Marvel Television	Netflix	
Legion	2017–2019	FX Productions, Marvel Television, The Donners' Company, Bad Hat Harry Productions (season 1), Kinberg Genre, and 26 Keys Productions	FX	Part of the X-Men franchise, not the Marvel Cinematic Universe
Iron Fist	2017–18	ABC Studios, Devilina Productions (season 1), and Marvel Television	Netflix	
The Defenders	2017	ABC Studios, Marvel Television, Nine and a Half Fingers, Inc., and Goddard Textiles	Netflix	Miniseries
Inhumans	2017	ABC Studios, Marvel Television, Devilina Productions, and IMAX Entertainment (financer)	ABC	Versions of the first two episodes were screened in IMAX theaters
The Gifted	2017–2019	20th Century Fox Television, Marvel Television, The Donners' Company, Bad Hat Harry Productions, Kinberg Genre, and Flying Glass of Milk Productions	Fox	Part of the X-Men franchise, not the Marvel Cinematic Universe
The Punisher	2017–2019	ABC Studios, Marvel Television, and Bohemian Risk Productions	Netflix	
Runaways	2017–2019	ABC Signature Studios, Marvel Television, and Fake Empire	Hulu	
Cloak & Dagger	2018–19	ABC Signature Studios, Marvel Television, and Wandering Rocks Productions	Freeform	
Helstrom	2020	ABC Signature Studios, Marvel Television, and Lone Lemon Entertainment	Hulu	Initially meant to share continuity with the Marvel Cinematic Universe but was clarified as a standalone series by showrunner Paul Zbyszewski

==== Animated ====
Series	Aired	Production	Network(s)	Notes
Spider-Man: The New Animated Series	2003	Mainframe Entertainment / Adelaide Productions / Sony Pictures Television	MTV	13 episodes
The Spectacular Spider-Man	2008–09	Culver Entertainment / Adelaide Productions / Sony Pictures Television	The CW; Disney XD	26 episodes
Wolverine and the X-Men	2009	Marvel Studios / Marvel Animation / Toonz Entertainment / First Serve International / Liberation Entertainment / EVA Finance GmbH	CBBC; Nicktoons	26 episodes Animation by Toonz First Serve and Noxxon Entertainment Inc.
Iron Man: Armored Adventures	2009–12	Marvel Animation / Method Animation / DQ Entertainment / LuxAnimation (season 1) / Fabrique D'Images (season 2) / Onyx Lux (season 2)	Nicktoons; France 2 (season 1); France 4 (season 2)	2 seasons, 52 episodes
The Super Hero Squad Show	2009–11	Marvel Animation / Film Roman	Cartoon Network	
Astonishing X-Men: Gifted	2009–10	Marvel Knights Animation	iTunes; DVD	
The Avengers: Earth's Mightiest Heroes	2010–12	Marvel Animation / Film Roman	Disney XD	
Marvel Anime: Iron Man	2010–11 (Japan); 2011–12 (U.S.)	Madhouse / Sony Pictures Home Entertainment	G4 (U.S.); SF (Australia)	Each anime series consisted of 12 episodes
Marvel Anime: Wolverine	2010–11 (Japan); 2011–12 (U.S.)	Madhouse / Sony Pictures Home Entertainment	G4 (U.S.); SF (Australia)	Each anime series consisted of 12 episodes
Marvel Anime: X-Men	2010–11 (Japan); 2011–12 (U.S.)	Madhouse / Sony Pictures Home Entertainment	G4 (U.S.); SF (Australia)	Each anime series consisted of 12 episodes
Marvel Anime: Blade	2010–11 (Japan); 2011–12 (U.S.)	Madhouse / Sony Pictures Home Entertainment	G4 (U.S.); SF (Australia)	Each anime series consisted of 12 episodes
Black Panther	2010–11 (Australia, US)	Marvel Knights Animation	iTunes; BET	
Iron Man: Extremis	2010	Marvel Knights Animation	iTunes	
Spider-Woman: Agent of S.W.O.R.D.	2011	Marvel Knights Animation	DVD	5 episodes
Thor / Loki: Blood Brothers	2011	Marvel Knights Animation	iTunes	
Astonishing X-Men: Dangerous	2012	Marvel Knights Animation	DVD	
Astonishing X-Men: Torn	2012	Marvel Knights Animation	DVD	
Astonishing X-Men: Unstoppable	2012	Marvel Knights Animation	DVD	
Ultimate Spider-Man	2012–17	Marvel Animation / Film Roman	Disney XD	4 seasons, 104 episodes
Avengers Assemble	2013–19	Marvel Animation / Man of Action Studios	Disney XD	5 seasons, 126 episodes
Hulk and the Agents of S.M.A.S.H.	2013–15	Marvel Animation / Film Roman	Disney XD	2 seasons, 52 episodes
Inhumans	2013	Marvel Knights Animation	DVD	
Wolverine: Origin	2013	Marvel Knights Animation	DVD	
Ultimate Wolverine vs. Hulk	2013	Marvel Knights Animation	DVD	
Wolverine Versus Sabretooth	2014	Marvel Knights Animation	DVD	
Wolverine: Weapon X: Tomorrow Dies Today	2014	Marvel Knights Animation	DVD	
Eternals	2014	Marvel Knights Animation	DVD	
Wolverine Versus Sabretooth: Reborn	2015	Marvel Knights Animation	DVD	
Marvel Disk Wars: The Avengers	2014–15 (Japan); 2015–16 (Southeast Asia)	Toei Animation / The Walt Disney Company Japan	TX Network (Japan); Disney XD (Southeast Asia)	51 episodes
Guardians of the Galaxy	2015–19	Marvel Animation	Disney XD	3 seasons, 79 episodes
Marvel Future Avengers	2017–18	Madhouse / The Walt Disney Company Japan	Dlife (Japan); Disney XD (Southeast Asia)	2 seasons, 39 episodes
Spider-Man	2017–20	Marvel Animation	Disney XD	3 seasons, 58 episodes
M.O.D.O.K.	2021	Marvel Television (Note: Oversight of the series' production was transferred to Marvel Studios after closing.) / Multiverse Cowboy / Stoopid Buddy Stoodios	Hulu (United States); Disney+ (Star Hub) (Worldwide)	10 episodes Not part of the Marvel Cinematic Universe
Hit-Monkey	2021	Marvel Television / Speck Gordon Inc. / Floyd County Productions	Hulu (United States); Disney+ (Star Hub) (Worldwide)	10 episodes Not part of the Marvel Cinematic Universe Production of the series moved to 20th Television Animation following its first season.

==== Short series ====
Series	Aired	Production	Network(s)	Notes
Agents of S.H.I.E.L.D.: Slingshot	2016	ABC Studios and Marvel Television	ABC.com	Part of the Marvel Cinematic Universe
Rocket & Groot shorts	2017	Marvel Animation and Passion Pictures	Disney XD	12 episodes
Ant-Man shorts	2017	Marvel Animation and Passion Pictures	Disney XD	6 episodes
Marvel Super Hero Adventures shorts	2017–2020	Marvel Animation and Atomic Cartoons	Disney Channel Disney Junior YouTube (Marvel HQ)	40 episodes
Marvel Rising: Initiation shorts	2018	Marvel Animation	Disney XD	6 episodes
Marvel Rising shorts	2019	Marvel Animation	YouTube (Marvel HQ)	7 episodes
Marvel Rising: Ultimate Comics shorts	2019	Marvel Animation	YouTube (Marvel HQ)	6 episodes

=== Film ===
==== Feature films ====
Year	Film	Directed by	Written by	Produced / Distributed by	Budget	Gross
1998	Blade	Stephen Norrington	David S. Goyer	New Line Cinema	$40 million	$131.2 million
2000	X-Men	Bryan Singer	Story by Tom DeSanto & Bryan Singer; Screenplay by David Hayter	20th Century Fox	$75 million	$296.3 million
2002	Blade II	Guillermo del Toro	David S. Goyer	New Line Cinema	$54 million	$155 million
2002	Spider-Man	Sam Raimi	David Koepp	Columbia Pictures	$139 million	$821.7 million
2003	Daredevil	Mark Steven Johnson		20th Century Fox	$78 million	$179.2 million
2003	X2	Bryan Singer	Story by Zak Penn and David Hayter & Bryan Singer; Screenplay by Michael Dougherty & Dan Harris and David Hayter	20th Century Fox	$110 million	$407.7 million
2003	Hulk	Ang Lee	Story by James Schamus; Screenplay by John Turman and Michael France and James Schamus	Universal Pictures	$137 million	$245.4 million
2004	The Punisher	Jonathan Hensleigh	Jonathan Hensleigh and Michael France	Lionsgate Films / Artisan Entertainment / Columbia Pictures	$33 million	$54.7 million
2004	Spider-Man 2	Sam Raimi	Story by Alfred Gough & Miles Millar and Michael Chabon; Screenplay by Alvin Sargent	Columbia Pictures	$200 million	$783.8 million
2004	Blade: Trinity	David S. Goyer		New Line Cinema	$65 million	$128.9 million
2005	Elektra	Rob Bowman	Zak Penn and Stuart Zicherman & Raven Metzner	20th Century Fox	$43 million	$56.7 million
2005	Man-Thing	Brett Leonard	Han Rodionoff	Lionsgate Films / Artisan Entertainment	$30 million	$1.1 million
2005	Fantastic Four	Tim Story	Mark Frost and Michael France	20th Century Fox	$100 million	$330.6 million
2006	X-Men: The Last Stand	Brett Ratner	Simon Kinberg & Zak Penn	20th Century Fox	$210 million	$459.4 million
2007	Ghost Rider	Mark Steven Johnson		Columbia Pictures	$110 million	$228.7 million
2007	Spider-Man 3	Sam Raimi	Screenplay by Sam Raimi & Ivan Raimi and Alvin Sargent; Story by Sam Raimi & Ivan Raimi	Columbia Pictures	$258 million	$890.9 million
2007	Fantastic Four: Rise of the Silver Surfer	Tim Story	Screenplay by Don Payne and Mark Frost; Story by John Turman and Mark Frost	20th Century Fox	$130 million	$289 million
2008	Punisher: War Zone	Lexi Alexander	Nick Santora and Art Marcum & Matt Holloway	Lionsgate Films	$35 million	$10.1 million
2009	X-Men Origins: Wolverine	Gavin Hood	David Benioff and Skip Woods	20th Century Fox	$150 million	$373.1 million
2011	X-Men: First Class	Matthew Vaughn	Screenplay by Ashley Edward Miller, Zack Stentz and Jane Goldman & Matthew Vaughn; Story by Sheldon Turner and Bryan Singer	20th Century Fox	$140–$160 million	$353.6 million
2012	Ghost Rider: Spirit of Vengeance	Mark Neveldine and Brian Taylor	Screenplay by Scott M. Gimple and Seth Hoffman & David S. Goyer; Story by David S. Goyer	Columbia Pictures	$57 million	$132.6 million
2012	The Amazing Spider-Man	Marc Webb	Screenplay by James Vanderbilt, Alvin Sargent and Steve Kloves; Story by James Vanderbilt	Columbia Pictures	$230 million	$757.9 million
2013	The Wolverine	James Mangold	Scott Frank and Mark Bomback	20th Century Fox	$120 million	$414.8 million
2014	The Amazing Spider-Man 2	Marc Webb	Screenplay by Alex Kurtzman, Roberto Orci and Jeff Pinkner; Story by Alex Kurtzman, Roberto Orci, Jeff Pinkner and James Vanderbilt	Columbia Pictures	$200–293 million	$709 million
2014	X-Men: Days of Future Past	Bryan Singer	Screenplay by Simon Kinberg; Story by Matthew Vaughn, Jane Goldman & Simon Kinberg	20th Century Fox	$200 million	$747.9 million
2015	Fantastic Four	Josh Trank	Jeremy Slater, Seth Grahame-Smith & Simon Kinberg	20th Century Fox	$120 million	$168 million
2016	Deadpool	Tim Miller	Rhett Reese and Paul Wernick	20th Century Fox	$58 million	$783.1 million
2016	X-Men: Apocalypse	Bryan Singer	Simon Kinberg, Dan Harris and Michael Dougherty	20th Century Fox	$178 million	$534.5 million
2017	Logan	James Mangold	Screenplay by Michael Green, Scott Frank and James Mangold; Story by James Mangold	20th Century Fox	$97 million	$619 million
2018	Deadpool 2	David Leitch	Rhett Reese, Paul Wernick and Ryan Reynolds	20th Century Fox	$110 million	$785 million
2018	Venom	Ruben Fleischer	Screenplay by Jeff Pinkner, Scott Rosenberg and Kelly Marcel; Story by Jeff Pinkner and Scott Rosenberg	Columbia Pictures	$100 million	$855 million
2018	Spider-Man: Into the Spider-Verse	Bob Persichetti, Peter Ramsey and Rodney Rothman	Screenplay by Phil Lord and Rodney Rothman; Story by Phil Lord	Columbia Pictures / Sony Pictures Animation	$90 million	$384.3 million
2019	Dark Phoenix	Simon Kinberg		20th Century Fox	$200 million	$252.4 million
2020	The New Mutants	Josh Boone	Josh Boone and Knate Lee	20th Century Studios	$80 million	$49.2 million
2021	Venom: Let There Be Carnage	Andy Serkis	Screenplay by Kelly Marcel; Story by Kelly Marcel and Tom Hardy	Columbia Pictures	$110 million	$506.8 million
2022	Morbius	Daniel Espinosa	Matt Sazama and Burk Sharpless	Columbia Pictures	$75–83 million	$167.5 million
2023	Spider-Man: Across the Spider-Verse	Joaquim Dos Santos, Kemp Powers, Justin K. Thompson	David Callaham, Phil Lord and Christopher Miller	Columbia Pictures / Sony Pictures Animation	$100 million	$690.8 million
2024	Madame Web	S. J. Clarkson	Screenplay by Matt Sazama & Burk Sharpless and Claire Parker & S. J. Clarkson; Story by Kerem Sanga and Matt Sazama & Burk Sharpless	Columbia Pictures	$80 million	$100.5 million
2024	Venom: The Last Dance	Kelly Marcel	Screenplay by Kelly Marcel; Story by Kelly Marcel and Tom Hardy	Columbia Pictures	$110 million	$475.6 million
2024	Kraven the Hunter	J. C. Chandor	Art Marcum and Matt Holloway and Richard Wenk	Columbia Pictures	$110 million	$53.9 million
2027	Spider-Man: Beyond the Spider-Verse	Bob Persichetti and Justin K. Thompson	David Callaham, Phil Lord and Christopher Miller	Columbia Pictures / Sony Pictures Animation		

==== Animated ====
All the films are made for Direct-to-video/television and produced by Marvel Animation, except as indicated.

Year	Directed by	Film	Notes
2006	Jamie Simone	Ultimate Avengers: The Movie	1st Marvel Animated Features film
2006	Jamie Simone	Ultimate Avengers 2: Rise of the Panther	2nd Marvel Animated Features film
2007	Jamie Simone	The Invincible Iron Man	3rd Marvel Animated Features film
2007	Jamie Simone	Doctor Strange: The Sorcerer Supreme	4th Marvel Animated Features film
2008	Jamie Simone	Next Avengers: Heroes of Tomorrow	5th Marvel Animated Features film
2009	Jamie Simone	Hulk Vs	6th Marvel Animated Features film
2010	Jamie Simone	Planet Hulk	7th Marvel Animated Features film
2011	Jamie Simone	Thor: Tales of Asgard	8th Marvel Animated Features film
2013	Hiroshi Hamasaki	Iron Man: Rise of Technovore	(Marvel Anime)
2013	Hiroshi Hamasaki	Iron Man & Hulk: Heroes United	digital
2014	Hiroshi Hamasaki	Avengers Confidential: Black Widow & Punisher	(Marvel Anime)
2014	Hiroshi Hamasaki	Iron Man & Captain America: Heroes United	digital
2015	Hiroshi Hamasaki	Marvel Super Hero Adventures: Frost Fight!	digital
2016	Mitch Schauer	Hulk: Where Monsters Dwell	digital
2018	Alfred Gimeno	Marvel Rising: Secret Warriors	Aired on Disney Channel and Disney XD
2019	Alfred Gimeno	Marvel Rising: Chasing Ghosts	Aired on YouTube (Marvel HQ)
2019	Alfred Gimeno	Marvel Rising: Heart of Iron	Aired on YouTube (Marvel HQ)
2019	Alfred Gimeno	Marvel Rising: Battle of the Bands	Aired on YouTube (Marvel HQ)
2019	Alfred Gimeno	Marvel Rising: Operation Shuri	Aired on YouTube (Marvel HQ)
2019	Alfred Gimeno	Marvel Rising: Playing with Fire	Aired on YouTube (Marvel HQ)

==== Short films ====
Year	Title	Collection	Notes
2017	No Good Deed	Deadpool	Released theatrically before Logan and free online
2019	Spider-Ham: Caught in a Ham	Spider-Verse	Released on YouTube
2021	Deadpool and Korg React	Deadpool	Released on YouTube
2024	The Spider Within: A Spider-Verse Story	Spider-Verse	Released on YouTube

== See also ==
- Marvel Studios
- Marvel Cinematic Universe
- Sony's Spider-Man Universe
- Marvel Games
- Lists of Marvel Comics characters
- Marvel characters in other media
- List of unproduced Marvel Comics adaptations
