= Morton E. Handel =

American businessman (born 1935)

- Born: 1935 (age 90–91)
- Employer(s): S&H Consulting Ltd.
- Title: President
- Board member of: Trump Entertainment Resorts Inc., Chair, Compensation & Strategic Committees; CompUSA, Inc. American Uranium Mining Company

Morton E. Handel (born 1935) is an American businessman who serves on the corporate board of directors and is president of S&H Consulting Ltd., a privately held investment and consulting company, where he has been employed since 1990.

== Career ==
In 1974, Handel move to West Hartford, Connecticut, to work for Coleco Industries as chief financial officer. In 1988, he was named chairman and chief executive of the company. Handel has also served on the board of Concurrent Computer Corp. and was chairman of the board of that company while he was a director. During the period from 1992 to 2009, he was the lead director of the Trump Entertainment Resorts board, a member of the CompUSA board, Linens and Things Board, Ithaca Industries board as well as Remington Products and Tallan, Inc boards. He was elected chairman of the Board of Marvel Entertainment in 1998 and served there until Marvel was acquired by The Disney Company in 2009.

== Charitable ==
Additional, he has served as vice chairman of the board of regents of the University of Hartford. Handel served as a director of the Hartford Symphony Orchestra becoming an emeritus director, a Bushnell overseer, and a life regent at the University of Hartford. The university receive a donation from Handel in the form of Hartt School's new Mort and Irma Handel Performing Arts Center.
