= Marvel's 616 =

2020 American anthology documentary series

- Genre: Anthology series Documentary
- Country of origin: United States
- Original language: English
- No. of seasons: 1
- No. of episodes: 8

Production
- Executive producer: Joe Quesada
- Producers: Amanda Rohlke; Sarah Regan; Juliette Eisner
- Production companies: Supper Club; Marvel New Media

Original release
- Network: Disney+
- Release: November 20, 2020

Marvel's 616 is an American anthology documentary television series by Marvel New Media and Supper Club for Disney+ that premiered on November 20, 2020. The name "616" refers to Earth-616, the fictional universe in which Marvel Comics is set. On November 20, executive producer Joe Quesada said that it was "definitely" possible that the show could be renewed for a second season. The show has not yet been officially renewed for season two. On May 26, 2023 the show was removed from Disney+.

Each episode focuses on a different interesting aspect of the Marvel Universe; for example, the first episode of the series is about Toei's adaption of Spider-Man. Other episodes revolve around Marvel cosplay, Marvel action figures, and even a Marvel Comics-themed musical. The show was also generally well-received, with reviewers appreciating the style and tone of the series.

== Premise ==
Marvel's 616 portrays eight stories illustrating some of the most interesting and unknown pockets of the Marvel Universe. It also explores the universe's "rich legacy of pioneering characters, creators, and storytelling to reflect the world outside your window."

== Episodes ==
No.	Title	Directed by	Original release date
1	"Japanese Spider-Man"	David Gelb	November 20, 2020
Gene Pelc describes how, when he traveled to Japan, he saw a multitude of manga comics, but was concerned because there were no Marvel Comics. He called up Marvel creator Stan Lee, and pitched the idea to him to make comics to sell in Japan that were more styled to what the Japanese wanted, with fewer words and more action than the American comics. These new comics became popular enough that 41 episodes of a new television series, Supaidāman, were ordered, with Shinji Tôdô playing the lead role. This new version of Spider-Man was vastly different from the original, and though Supaidāman's looks and all of his powers were identical, most of the characters were different. Tôdô reveals that before shooting the series, the cast all got together to watch the American Spider-Man film. Tôdô loved it and felt that the characters were "so human," while others (like critic Kōsei Ono) were not as into it.
2	"Higher, Further, Faster"	Gillian Jacobs	November 20, 2020
Gillian Jacobs interviews women about their thoughts on Marvel Comics. Sara Amanat talks about how she always wanted to join her brothers when they were doing things together, and how they introduced her to the Marvel world. Other women also discuss women in comics. The rest of the episode dives deeper into the topic until, in the 1950s, comic books were "accused of endangering America's youth." Some comics were even taken to court, until it was decided that, going forward, there would be a code to determine which comic books were appropriate enough to sell in stores. This development was a setback for Marvel Comics because they mostly wrote about action, fight scenes, and even death. Almost half of the people who had been reading Marvel comics at the time dropped out of the obsession, and comic companies dropped like flies.
3	"Amazing Artisans"	Clay Jeter	November 20, 2020
Different kinds of artists from all walks of life, from different backgrounds, have drawn amazing comics. It started as "a bunch of white guys in New York City" who drew what was around them, and now that comics have branched off into so many walks of life, the comics are more diverse as well. Comics like Moon Girl and Devil Dinosaur were created by normal people who practiced drawing and became Marvel artists. Artists make relatable characters; for example, Spider-Man has many traits that make him seem more human, and that readers can identify with. The episode goes more into how comic book artists have evolved since Stan Lee and others first created Marvel, and then focuses on the recent diversity in comic books, due to diverse authors writing stories, comics, and more, that all children can relate to.
4	"Lost & Found"	Paul Scheer	November 20, 2020
Episode director Paul Scheer pitches Marvel's 616 to Disney+ and struggles to find an episode plot. When he interviews Donny Cates and Gerry Duggan, he discovers a multitude of Marvel characters who barely got more than 10 comic issues and were never seen or heard from again, including Doctor Druid, who was given powers by Doctor Strange to leave him alone, or the Whizzer, who could run so fast he could create tornados with his speed. Villains even include Typeface, a sign-maker who got fired from his job and who has literal writing on his face. Soon, Scheer becomes obsessed with Brute Force, a four-issue Marvel comic series that begins with a group of animals being equipped with mechanical suits so they can fight crimes and be environmental activists. Scheer sets out to find Bob Budiansky, the editor of Brute Force, and other influential Marvel editors.
5	"Suit Up!"	Andrew Rossi	November 20, 2020
Marvel takes a look at the Marvel cosplay community through the eyes of five different cosplayers leading up to the New York Comic Con.
6	"Unboxed"	Sarah Ramos	November 20, 2020
The episode focuses on the history of Marvel toys. Namely, Hasbro and Funko.
7	"The Marvel Method"	Brian Oakes	November 20, 2020
8	"Spotlight"	Alison Brie	November 20, 2020

== Production ==
Production took place under the supervision of Marvel New Media and Supper Club. The show was announced along with Marvel's Hero Project, another Marvel documentary series, which was to be released when Disney+ was launched in November 2019. In addition, on November 21, 2020, a day after the series premiered, one poster for each episode was revealed. The entirety of the series, eight episodes, was released on November 20, 2020, on Disney+.

Notable directors from the series include Marvel Comics collaborator and actor Paul Scheer and Community's Gillian Jacobs, who also acted in the third reboot of The Twilight Zone, another Community actor Alison Brie and Mike McMahan's Rick and Morty. In addition, Marvel Comics creator Stan Lee appears through archival footage. Many guest stars appear in the series in interviews, such as Sara Amanat and Lorraine Cink. The day that the first season premiered on Disney+, executive producer Joe Quesada noted that a second season of the show was "definitely" possible.

== Reception ==
=== Critical reception ===
On Rotten Tomatoes, the series holds an approval rating of 100% based on six reviews, with an average rating of 9.50/10. Metacritic, which uses a weighted average, assigned the series a score of 84 out of 100, based on four critics, indicating "universal acclaim".

Caroline Framke of Variety found the stories provided by the anthology documentary fascinating, writing, "Marvel's 616" might not convince someone with little to no interest in comics of their potential virtue, but it's not trying to. Instead, it uses the vast records at its disposal to build a living history to show how, and why, Marvel has become such an unstoppable behemoth, doubters be damned." Kelsey Endter of CosplayCentral.com reviewed the fifth episode of the series "Suit Up!" positively, noting that the episode was "truly special" because it highlighted five New York Comic Con Marvel costume cosplayers, including StrongInCostume and ZiaCosplay. Drew Taylor of Collider gave the series an "A" rating and complimented how the series approaches the history of Marvel, claiming, "These documentaries are lengthy, highly detailed, and totally dissimilar from one installment to the next. It's an exhilarating watch, with each installment offering the thrill of the unexpected and the promise of even more surprises to come." Sam Barsanti of The A.V. Club gave the series an "A−" rating and stated that the show avoids mythologizing Marvel and succeeds to approach its universe, saying, "You might not walk away with a grand cohesive understanding of how Marvel has impacted the lives of its fans and employees, but you will come away with a very specific understanding of how it has impacted specific fans and employees in related and heartwarming ways." Ashley Moulton of Common Sense Media rated the series 4 out of 5 stars and complimented the series for its promotion of teamwork and creativity, indicating, "Detailed behind-the-scenes showcase fun for Marvel fans."

Richard Trenholm of CNET pointed out that certain fans of Marvel questioned the company's decision to feature Dan Slott in the seventh episode, titled "The Marvel Method", as it depicts him writing very slowly and putting those who work around him in dire situations by doing this, and some readers wondered if Slott was even working, or just slacking off. Josh Bell of CBR.com found that the series did not engage enough with the history of Marvel, indicating, "While just because the series accentuates the positive doesn't mean it can't be insightful, a lot of the content is superficial and bland, even if it's easy to watch thanks to the slick, engaging production."

=== Accolades ===
Year	Award	Category	Recipient(s)	Result	Ref.
2021	Hollywood Music In Media Awards	Best Main Title Theme - TV Show/Limited Series	Jeremy Turner	Nominated	
