= Hero Project =

2019–2020 Marvel documentary series

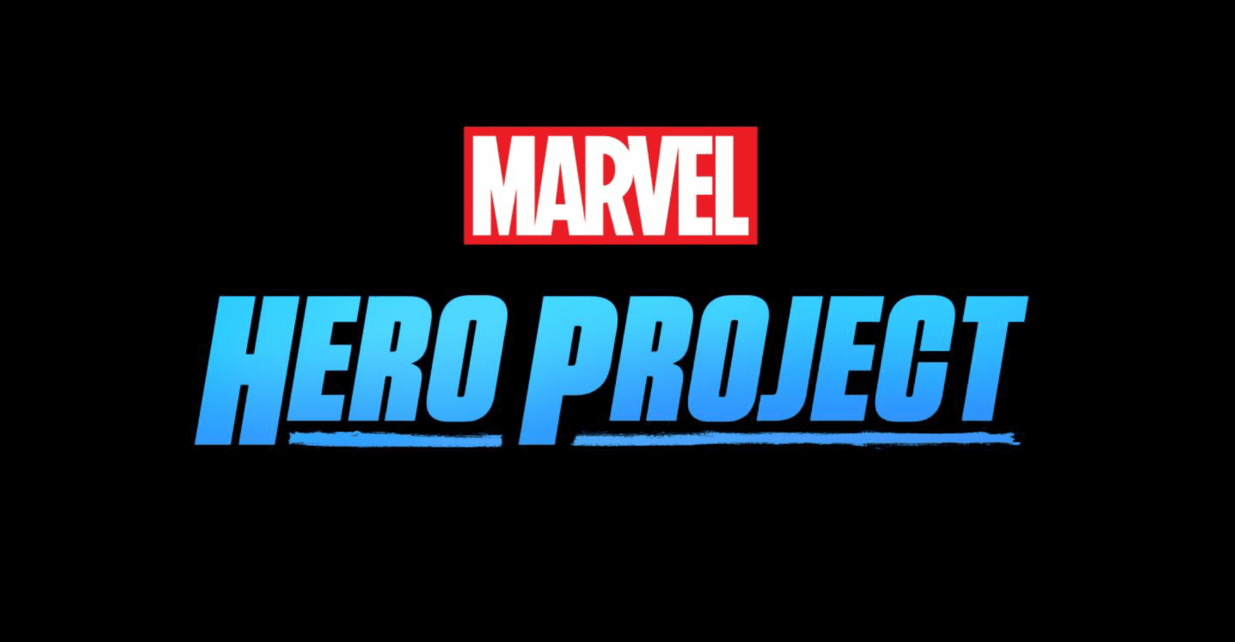
- Genre: Documentary
- Country of origin: United States
- Original language: English
- No. of seasons: 1
- No. of episodes: 20

Production
- Executive producers: Sana Amanat; Sarah Amos; Joe Quesada; Shane Rahmani; Stephen Wacker; Liza Wyles; Maura Mandt; John Hirsch
- Production companies: Marvel New Media; Maggievision Productions

Original release
- Network: Disney+
- Release: November 12, 2019 – March 20, 2020

Marvel's Hero Project is an American documentary television series by Marvel New Media for Disney+ streamed from November 12, 2019. The series was removed from Disney+ on May 26, 2023.

== Premise ==
The series follows the young heroes who are making remarkable and positive change across communities by dedicating their lives in selfless acts of bravery and kindness. Every kid who features in the show will have their own Marvel comic.

In life, it doesn't take wearing a suit of iron, carrying a mythical hammer, or swinging from spider webs to be a real hero. Sometimes the person who can make a positive difference in the world is the person who simply sees a problem and has the passion to find a creative solution.

— Marvel Entertainment

== Episodes ==
No.	Title	Name	Cause	Original release date
1	"Sensational Jordan"	Jordan Reeves	"Born Just Right" for supporting Disability and Inclusive Design	November 12, 2019
Jordan Reeves, who was born with a limb difference, created a prosthetic arm that can shoot glitter called "Project Unicorn", conducted support activities for people with disabilities, allowing them to make their own inclusive designs, and co-founded an organization for supporting people with disabilities called Born Just Right with her mother.
2	"Incredible Elijah"	Elijah Lee	Child Abuse Prevention	November 15, 2019
11-year-old Elijah Lee heard that his friend was abused by her parents, told her to get help, started learning more about child abuse, and spread awareness by hosting sermons and organizing child abuse awareness marches.
3	"Unstoppable Adonis"	Adonis Watt	Accessibility for the visually impaired	November 22, 2019
Adonis Watt, who was born into a sporting family, lost his eyesight due to congenital glaucoma when he was five years old, shattering his dreams of becoming a football player. However, instead of giving up his dreams, he quickly adjusted to the circumstances and became a national sensation when he scored two touchdowns as his team's running back in 2018.
4	"Here Comes Hailey"	Hailey Richman	Alzheimer's support	November 29, 2019
12-year-old Hailey Richman created a volunteer group called Puzzle Time that brings kids and Alzheimers patients together with puzzles. after seeing her grandmother battle with Alzheimer's disease. She also launched Kid Caregivers, a resource that offers support to kids taking care of family members with Alzheimer's and which connects young volunteers with dementia patients.
5	"Mighty Rebekah"	Rebekah Bruesehoff	LGBTQ Community	December 6, 2019
Rebekah, a 12-year-old trans girl, transitioned at the age of 8 with the help of her parents. She became actively involved in LGBTQ support when the Trump administration took a firm stance against rights for trans students. She also championed LGBT-inclusive education in New Jersey.
6	"Make Way for Jakhil"	Jahkil Naeem Jackson	"Project I Am" for Alleviating Homelessness	December 13, 2019
Jahkil distributes Blessing Bags full of essential items to help the homeless people in his city.
7	"Dazzling Lorelei"	Lorelei McIntyre-Brewer	Cardiac Care	December 20, 2019
Born with half a heart, Lorelei makes sure other kids like her get the cardiac care they need.
8	"Battlin' Braden"	Braden Baker	Providing Hearing aid	December 27, 2019
Braden travels the world delivering hearing aids, just like his own, to those who need them.
9	"Radiant Jayera"	Jayera Griffin	Community Service	January 3, 2020
Jayera works to level the playing field for those who could use support in hard financial times.
10	"Spectacular Sidney"	Sidney Keys	Literacy services for African American youth	January 10, 2020
Sidney empowers other boys, encouraging literacy and bringing awareness to African-American stories.
11	"Thrilling Tokata"	Tokata Iron Eyes	Storytelling to empower indigenous youth	January 17, 2020
Tokata advocates for other indigenous youth, amplifying their voices through storytelling.
12	"High-Kickin' Izzy"	Izzy Green	TBA	January 24, 2020
Izzy proved everyone wrong to become a taekwondo champion, and still gives herself to teach others.
13	"Soaring Seamus"	Seamus Casey	TBA	January 31, 2020
Seamus wants to give back to those who serve–the men and women who are willing to risk everything to ensure his freedom. He created a fundraising organization that taps into his love of rock-climbing to raise money for the families of fallen and wounded soldiers, so they can keep climbing towards their own dreams. Seamus is already a hero, but now, he's about to become a Marvel Super Hero.
14	"Dynamic Daniella"	TBA	TBA	February 7, 2020
15	"Roving Robbie"	TBA	TBA	February 14, 2020
16	"Genesis the Amazing Animal Ally"	TBA	TBA	February 21, 2020
17	"Superior Salvador"	TBA	TBA	February 28, 2020
18	"Genius Gitanjali"	Gitanjali Rao	Girls in STEM, Developed Thethys	March 6, 2020
12-year-old Indian-American Gitanjali Rao is curious by nature. When visiting India, she had a question as to why people were drinking water after warming. When the Flint water crisis arose, she thought of developing a sensor for detecting Lead based on an MIT paper using Carbon tubes for detecting air poisoning and named it THETHYS , for which she won the 2017 3M Young Scientist Lab. She also participates actively in teaching Kindergarten students STEM and her innovations.
19	"Astonishing Austin"	Austin	Growing food to end Hunger	March 13, 2020
Austin, knowing the scarcity of food from his experience, started to grow a garden where people are allowed to take what ever people need.
20	"High-Flying Hailey"	Hailey	Community Support for Cognitive diseases	March 20, 2020
Hailey, when she realized her twin sister Livy's ongoing medical care was putting a strain on her family's finances, with help from her parents and community, Hailey founded a kids' organization to provide community outreach and support for families with kids having Cognitive diseases.

== Development ==
The series is announced as one of the two documentaries by Marvel for Disney+ on April 10, 2019. The editors at Marvel Comics found some innovative ways to include these kids as superheroes and to surprise them by revealing they are immortalised in Marvel Comics.

Anyone can watch this show and feel like they can go out and do something. It helps families talk about difficult issues.

— Sarah Amos

== Release ==
The first episode of the series launched on November 12, 2019, as one of the first titles for Disney+ with a new episode on every Friday. The series has 20 episodes in total.

=== Promotion ===
At D23 Expo the series conducted a panel and explained about the series and revealed the release plan. On October 1, 2019, the first full trailer was released by Disney+. At New York Comic Con in early October, the first episode was screen by Marvel featuring Jordan Reeves, creator of Project Unicorn. Later on the day an exclusive clip was released online from the first episode.

=== Comics ===
The comics will be available on Marvel Unlimited and Marvel Digital Comic Store for free, concurrent with the episodes.

== Reception ==
=== Critical reception ===
The review aggregator website Rotten Tomatoes reported a 92% approval rating for the first season with an average rating of 7.90/10, based on 13 reviews. The website's critical consensus reads, "A heartwarming and powerful glimpse into the lives of some real-life heroes, Marvel's Hero Project finds inspiration in a new generation of innovators." Metacritic, which uses a weighted average, assigned a score of 54 out of 100 based on 5 critics, indicating "mixed or average reviews".

Dave Trumbore, writing for Collider said, "The non-fiction show reveals the remarkable, positive change 20 young, real-life heroes are making in their own communities. These inspiring, driven, and engaging kids have dedicated their lives to selfless acts of bravery and kindness, and now, Marvel celebrates them by welcoming them into Marvel's Hero Project." Joel Keller of Decider found that the documentary provides inspirational stories, claiming it demonstrates how differences can become beneficial, while saying that the show empowers the audience and encourage creativity. CNET's Bonnie Burton declared, "Marvel's Hero Project on Disney Plus spotlights real kids making a difference." Melissa Camacho of Common Sense Media rated the documentary 5 out of 5 stars, stating: "Marvel's Hero Project is an uplifting series that profiles heroic tweens and teens who are taking leadership roles in their communities and proactively trying to making a positive difference in the world." Matt Fowler for IGN rated the series 7,5 out of 10 and wrote: "Marvel's Hero Project is a well-intentioned and nicely-presented packaging of profiles featuring some uniquely inspiring young warriors willfully making the world a better place. It's not entirely suited for a 30-minute format, and you can often feel the strain, but it's never not uplifting."

=== Accolades ===
Year	Award	Category	Nominee(s)	Result	Ref.
2020	Online Film & Television Association TV Awards	Best Children's Program	Marvel's Hero Project	Runner-up	
