= Iron Heart =

Iron Heart or Ironheart may refer to:

== People ==
- Cantemaza, Chief Ironheart (1822–1896), a leader of the Wahpeton Spirit Lake Tribe
- Reinhard Heydrich (1904–1942), nicknamed "the man with the iron heart", SS Officer and Nazi governor of occupied Czechoslovakia

=== Fictional characters ===
- Ironheart (character), a superhero from Marvel Comics
- Morag Ironheart, a character created by Peter Simple
- Luther Ironheart, a character from the comic book series American Flagg!
- Lorkon Ironheart, a character from the 2009 James M. Stuart novel Lord of Meledor
- Koo the Iron Heart, a character from the 1979 film His Name Is Nobody
- Jason Ironheart, a character from Babylon 5
- Teppei Kiyoshi, a.k.a. Iron Heart, a character from the anime series Kuroko's Basketball
- Mr. Ironheart, a fictional spy from the animanga 009-1

=== Fictional locations ===
- Iron Heart, a fictional building from the video game Neverwinter
- Iron Heart, a fictional country from the RPG Rifts

== Film and television ==
=== Film ===
- Ironheart (film), a 1992 martial arts film starring Bolo Yeung
- The Iron Heart (1917 film) a lost silent film directed by George Fitzmaurice
- The Iron Heart (1920 film), a silent film directed by Denison Clift

=== Television ===
- Ironheart (miniseries), a 2025 Marvel Cinematic Universe (MCU) series based on the comic character
- "Iron Heart", an episode of the Japanese anime series Psycho-Pass
- The Iron Heart (TV series), a 2022 Filipino action drama series

== Literature ==
- Ironheart, a 2019 Marvel Comics limited-series comic book
- War Machine Vol. 1: Iron Heart, a Marvel Comics 2009 comic book about War Machine
- IRON HEART, a manga in the Gundam franchise
- An Iron Heart, a chapter of the manga Rave Master
- The Iron Heart, a 2009 novel by Marshall Browne
- Iron Heart, a 1923 novel by William MacLeod Raine

== Music ==
- The Iron Heart (band), an American rock band
- Eisenherz (Ironheart), a 2002 album and its title song by Joachim Witt, also called
- Laney Amplification Ironheart, a series of guitar amps
- "Iron Heart", a song by Blutengel from the 2002 album Angel Dust
- "Alma" (song), a.k.a. "Iron Heart", a song and single by Fonseca from the 2008 album Gratitud
- "Iron Heart", a song by A Storm of Light from the 2008 album And We Wept the Black Ocean Within
- "Ironheart", a song by Two Steps from Hell from the 2010 album Power of Darkness
- "Iron Heart", a song by Netsky from the 2010 album Netsky
- "My Iron Heart", a 2019 song by Miss Vincent

== Other uses ==
- Iron Heart, a 2010 St. Petersburg exhibition of paintings by Sergey Bashkirov
- "Iron Heart", a fictional martial art from Tome of Battle: The Book of Nine Swords
- Iron Heart, a 2003 women's pro-wrestling meet of the AAAW Single Championship

== See also ==
- Hearts of Iron, a 2002 video game
