= Iron Man in other media =

Marvel Comics version of Iron Man in other media

Adaptations of Iron Man in other media
- Original source: Comics published by Marvel Comics
- First appearance: Tales of Suspense #39 (March 1963)

Films and television
- Film(s): The Invincible Iron Man (2007); Iron Man (2008); Iron Man 2 (2010); The Avengers (2012); Iron Man: Rise of Technovore (2013); Iron Man 3 (2013); Avengers Confidential: Black Widow and Punisher (2014); Avengers: Age of Ultron (2015); Captain America: Civil War (2016); Spider-Man: Homecoming; Avengers: Infinity War (2018); Avengers: Endgame (2019); Black Panther: Wakanda Forever (2022)
- Television show(s): The Marvel Super Heroes (1966); Iron Man (1994); Iron Man: Armored Adventures (2009); Marvel Anime: Iron Man (2010); Ironheart (2025); Iron Man and His Awesome Friends (2025)

Games
- Video game(s): Iron Man and X-O Manowar in Heavy Metal (1996); The Invincible Iron Man (2002); Iron Man (2008); Iron Man 2 (2010); Iron Man 3: The Official Game (2013)

The Marvel Comics character Iron Man has appeared in various other media since his debut in Tales of Suspense #39 (March 1963). Iron Man has been the focus of three animated series, two Japanese animated projects, and a direct-to-DVD animated feature. An Iron Man live-action feature film starring Robert Downey Jr. as the character and directed by Jon Favreau was released in 2008, with Downey also appearing as the character in the two sequels Iron Man 2 and 3, in a cameo in The Incredible Hulk, and as a main character in several other films in the Marvel Cinematic Universe (MCU) including The Avengers, Avengers: Age of Ultron, Captain America: Civil War, Spider-Man: Homecoming, Avengers: Infinity War, and Avengers: Endgame.

== Television ==
=== 1960s ===
Iron Man on The Marvel Super Heroes animated series.

Iron Man appears as one of the main protagonists in The Marvel Super Heroes, voiced by John Vernon.

=== 1980s ===
- Iron Man makes guest appearances in Spider-Man and His Amazing Friends, voiced by William Marshall. This version provided the titular Spider-Friends with their crime-detection technology.
- Iron Man makes non-speaking cameo appearances in Spider-Man (1981).
- An Iron Man TV series was one of several pitches in the 1980s and an unaired pilot was produced in 1980.

=== 1990s ===
- Iron Man appears in a self-titled animated series, voiced by Robert Hays. This version was previously captured by the Mandarin rather than Wong Chu, has shrapnel near his spine rather than his heart, and is a member of Force Works.
- Iron Man makes non-speaking cameo appearances in Fantastic Four.
- Iron Man appears in Spider-Man: The Animated Series, with Robert Hays reprising the role.
- Iron Man appears in The Incredible Hulk episode "Helping Hand, Iron Fist", voiced again by Robert Hays.
- Iron Man appears in The Avengers: United They Stand episode "Shooting Stars", voiced by Francis Diakowsky.

=== 2000s ===
Iron Man in Iron Man: Armored Adventures.

- Iron Man appears in the Fantastic Four: World's Greatest Heroes episode "Shell Games", voiced by David Kaye.
- A teenage Iron Man appears as the main character in Iron Man: Armored Adventures, voiced by Adrian Petriw.
- Iron Man appears in The Super Hero Squad Show, voiced by Tom Kenny.

=== 2010s ===
- Iron Man appears in The Avengers: Earth's Mightiest Heroes, voiced by Eric Loomis. As in the comics, he is one of the founding members of the team and provides them with the Avengers Mansion as well as technology, including special ID cards and Quinjets. This Iron Man includes the elements from the comics canon and some elements from the Marvel Cinematic Universe, including the Arc Reactor in his chest as well as his armor being run by the J.A.R.V.I.S. A.I., as opposed to the HOMER system in the comics. He serves as team leader, and is seen in the opening credits monitoring the team's activities on various view screens.
- As part of a four-series collaboration between the Japanese Madhouse animation house and Marvel, Iron Man starred in a 12 episode anime series that premiered in Japan on Animax in October 2010 and is shown on G4 in the United States. It concluded on Animax after running the full dozen episodes on December 17, 2010. He is voiced by Keiji Fujiwara in Japanese and Adrian Pasdar in English. He additionally appears in a non-speaking cameo in the final episode of Marvel Anime: X-Men.
- Iron Man appears in Ultimate Spider-Man, with Pasdar reprising his role. Additionally, The Super Hero Squad Show incarnation of the character makes a non-speaking cameo appearance in the episode "Flight of the Iron Spider".
- Iron Man appears in Lego Marvel Super Heroes: Maximum Overload, once again voiced by Adrian Pasdar.
- Iron Man appears in Hulk and the Agents of S.M.A.S.H., once again voiced by Pasdar.
- Iron Man appears in Phineas and Ferb: Mission Marvel, with Pasdar reprising his role.
- Iron Man appears in Avengers Assemble, voiced once again by Pasdar, and by Mick Wingert from the fourth season onward.
- The Marvel Cinematic Universe version of Iron Man briefly appears via stock footage in the pilot episode of Agents of S.H.I.E.L.D..
- The president of Disney Channel Worldwide Gary Marsh announced a new Iron Man series is in development.
- Iron Man appears in the anime series Marvel Disk Wars: The Avengers, with Matthew Mercer reprising his role.
- Iron Man appears in the television special Lego Marvel Super Heroes: Avengers Reassembled, voiced by Mick Wingert.
- Iron Man appears in Guardians of the Galaxy, voiced again by Mick Wingert.
- Iron Man appears in Marvel Super Hero Adventures: Frost Fight!, voiced again by Mick Wingert.
- Iron Man appears in Spider-Man, voiced again by Mick Wingert. Similar to the Marvel Cinematic Universe incarnation, this version does not have a secret identity and regularly hosts the Stark Expo.
- Iron Man appears in Marvel Future Avengers, voiced by Eiji Hanawa in the original Japanese version and again by Mick Wingert in the English dub.

=== 2020s ===
- Iron Man appears in Lego Marvel Avengers: Climate Conundrum, voiced by Giles Panton.
- Iron Man appears in M.O.D.O.K., voiced by Jon Hamm. This version is the owner of A.I.M.
- Iron Man appears in What If...?, voiced by Mick Wingert.
- Iron Man appears in Lego Marvel Avengers: Loki in Training, voiced again by Giles Panton.
- Iron Man appears in Spidey and His Amazing Friends, voiced by John Stamos.
- Iron Man makes a non-speaking cameo appearance in the X-Men '97 episode "Tolerance is Extinction - Part 3".
- Iron Man appears in Lego Marvel Avengers: Mission Demolition, voiced again by John Stamos.
- Iron Man appears in Iron Man and His Awesome Friends, voiced by Mason Blomberg.
- Iron Man appears in Lego Marvel Avengers: Strange Tails, voiced again by Mick Wingert.

=== Television series based on the Iron Man franchise ===
Original Work
Spin Off

Year	Title	Medium	Seasons	Episodes	Actor	Production Studio
1966	The Invincible Iron Man	Animation	1	13	John Vernon	Grantray-Lawrence Animation
1994	Iron Man (TV series)	Animation	2	26	Robert Hays	Marvel Films
2009	Iron Man: Armored Adventures	CG	2	52	Adrian Petriw	Method Animation
2010	Iron Man (Marvel Anime)	Animation	1	12	Keiji Fujiwara	Madhouse
2025	Ironheart	Live Action	1	6	Dominique Thorne	Marvel Television
2025	Iron Man and His Awesome Friends	CG	1	30	Mason Blomberg	Atomic Cartoons

== Film ==
=== Animation ===
- Iron Man was featured in Ultimate Avengers, an animated direct-to-video adaptation of the Ultimates produced by Marvel Entertainment and Lions Gate Films, voiced by Marc Worden. Although based on Ultimate Iron Man, the animated version's identity is not a matter of public record, and, as in main Marvel Universe continuity, he is afflicted with a heart condition rather than a brain tumor. In the first film he is reluctant to join the Avengers, but later becomes a full-time member. Marvel/Lions Gate released Ultimate Avengers 2 on August 8, 2006. In the second film Iron Man's old armor is ruined, so he uses the War Machine armor.
- Marc Worden reprises his role of Iron Man in The Invincible Iron Man. The film has a slightly changed origin where Stark is taken to China. There he meets Li Mei, and with Rhodey builds a suit of armor. As Iron Man he takes down four elementals attempting to resurrect his arch enemy, the Mandarin, who in this incarnation is a Kahgan who has been deceased for many centuries.
- An elderly Iron Man appears in Next Avengers: Heroes of Tomorrow voiced by Tom Kane.
- Stark, voiced again by Marc Worden, makes a brief appearance in the Planet Hulk animated film.
- Iron Man appears in Iron Man: Rise of Technovore, voiced by Matthew Mercer.
- Iron Man appears as a central character in Iron Man & Hulk: Heroes United which was released in 2014. Adrian Pasdar reprised his role as Stark from Ultimate Spider-Man and the Iron Man Anime. Iron Man also appears in Iron Man & Captain America: Heroes United which was released in 2014.
- Iron Man appears in the anime film Avengers Confidential: Black Widow & Punisher with Mercer reprising his role.
- Iron Man appears in the animated film Marvel Super Hero Adventures: Frost Fight, with Mick Wingert reprising the role from Lego Marvel Super Heroes: Avengers Reassembled.
- Iron Man appears in Lego Marvel Super Heroes - Black Panther: Trouble in Wakanda, voiced again by Mick Wingert.
- Iron Man makes a non-speaking cameo appearance in Ralph Breaks the Internet.
- Iron Man appears in Lego Marvel Avengers: Code Red, voiced again by Mick Wingert.

=== Marvel Cinematic Universe ===
Robert Downey Jr. as Tony Stark, as depicted in the film Iron Man 3.

Robert Downey Jr. portrays Tony Stark in Iron Man (2008), Iron Man 2 (2010), The Avengers (2012), Iron Man 3 (2013), Avengers: Age of Ultron (2015), Captain America: Civil War (2016), Spider-Man: Homecoming (2017), Avengers: Infinity War (2018), and Avengers: Endgame (2019), as well as having a cameo in The Incredible Hulk (2008) that is also shown via archive footage in the Marvel One-Shot, The Consultant (2011). Davin Ransom portrayed a young Tony Stark in Iron Man 2.

== Video games ==
Iron Man is featured in several video games.

- He is one of four selectable heroes in Captain America and The Avengers (1991).
- Iron Man appears in few Capcom games licensed by Marvel:
  - Iron Man appears in few Marvel-licensed Capcom fighting games, particularly in Marvel vs. Capcom series.
    - Chris Britton voices the character in the 2D era fighting games Marvel Super Heroes (1995) and in Marvel vs. Capcom 2: New Age of Heroes (2000).
    - He is one of five playable characters in Marvel Super Heroes in War of the Gems (1996). Clones of Iron Man also appear as foot soldier enemies and bosses in this game.
    - Eric Loomis reprises his role in 3D era Marvel vs. Capcom games:
      - Iron Man appears as a playable fighter in Marvel vs. Capcom 3: Fate of Two Worlds, donning his Extremis armor. Alternate colors include the "tin can" prototype armor, Stealth Suit, and Silver Centurion armor, with Norman Osborn's Iron Patriot armor available as downloadable content. He appears in the Mike Haggar character ending as Haggar's running mate for his presidential campaign. Iron Man would later appear as a playable character in the standalone update of the game, Ultimate Marvel vs. Capcom 3.
      - Iron Man is a playable character in Marvel vs. Capcom: Infinite, with Eric Loomis reprising the role.
- Iron Man appears as an assist character in Avengers in Galactic Storm.
- Iron Man appears in Iron Man and X-O Manowar in Heavy Metal for the PC, PlayStation, the Game Boy, Saturn and Game Gear.
- The Invincible Iron Man was released on the Game Boy Advance in late 2002.
- The Invincible Iron Man was also the title for a cancelled game for the GameCube, PlayStation 2, and Xbox.
- Iron Man appears as an unlockable playable character in Tony Hawk's Underground.
- Iron Man appears in The Punisher, voiced by John Cygan.
- Iron Man appears as an unlockable character in X-Men Legends II: Rise of Apocalypse voiced again by John Cygan. The War Machine armor also appears as an alternate costume.
- Iron Man is one of the main characters in Marvel Nemesis: Rise of the Imperfects, voiced by David Kaye.
- Iron Man appears in the Marvel: Ultimate Alliance series:
  - John Cygan reprises his role of Iron Man who is a playable character in Marvel: Ultimate Alliance. His costumes include his New Avenger armor, his Classic armor, the War Machine armor, and his Ultimate armor. Iron Man is one of the main characters in game; Stark Tower is one of the bases of the team in the game. He has special dialogue with Nick Fury, the Crimson Dynamo, Deathbird, Dark Colossus, and Dark Captain America. A simulation disk has Iron Man fighting Ultimo on the S.H.I.E.L.D. Helicarrier. He is also a PSP exclusive boss character on Black Widow's simulation mission in that handheld port.
  - Iron Man appears as a playable character and boss in Marvel: Ultimate Alliance 2, voiced by Crispin Freeman. He is one of the first four characters available for play in the game, and one of the three major characters alongside Captain America and Nick Fury. Since the game's storyline is based on the Civil War story arc, he plays a major role as the leader of the Pro-Registration Movement. His alternate costume is a slightly modified classic costume.
  - Iron Man appears as a playable character in Marvel Ultimate Alliance 3: The Black Order, with Eric Loomis reprising his role.
- Iron Man appears in a video game adaptions based on Phase 1 films of Marvel Cinematic Universe where Iron Man appeared prior to The Avengers film:
  - In 2008, Sega Corporation published an Iron Man video game in tandem with the release of the film, with Robert Downey Jr. reprising his role as Tony Stark and Iron Man voiced by Stephen Stanton.
  - Stephen Stanton reprises his role of Iron Man in The Incredible Hulk video game. He serves as a boss and enemy should the Hulk cause too much destruction. He fights the Hulk in his Hulkbuster Armor MK II. Iron Man's Hulkbuster Armor is playable if one has the data of the Iron Man video game on their memory card.
  - Iron Man appears in the video game adaption of Iron Man 2 voiced by Eric Loomis.
- Iron Man is the main character in Iron Man: Aerial Assault.
- Iron Man appears as a playable character in the Marvel Super Hero Squad video game and its sequel, with Tom Kenny reprising his role.
- An Iron Man pinball machine produced by Stern was released in 2010. It is based on the first two feature films.
- Iron Man is available as downloadable content for the game LittleBigPlanet, as part of "Marvel Costume Kit 1".
- Iron Man is a playable character in Marvel Super Hero Squad Online and Marvel Super Hero Squad: Comic Combat, voiced by Tom Kenny in his standard armor, Hulkbuster armor, and Stealth armor.
- Iron Man is a playable character in the Facebook game Marvel Avengers Alliance.
- Iron Man appears as a playable character in Marvel Avengers: Battle for Earth, voiced by Chris Cox.
- Iron Man is a playable character in the MMORPG Marvel Heroes, voiced by Marc Worden.
- Iron Man is a playable character in the Lego Marvel games Lego Marvel Super Heroes, Lego Marvel's Avengers and Lego Marvel Super Heroes 2, voiced by Adrian Pasdar, Robert Downey Jr. and Christopher Ragland respectively.
- Iron Man is a playable character in Marvel Avengers Alliance Tactics.
- Iron Man is a playable character in Marvel Contest of Champions. His Endo-Sym armor and Hulkbuster armor also appear as separate characters.
- Iron Man is a playable character in Marvel Puzzle Quest, with four different versions, including the Hulkbuster armor.
- Iron Man is a playable character in Disney Infinity: Marvel Super Heroes, voiced again by Adrian Pasdar. His Hulkbuster armor is added as a separate character in the 3.0 edition, also voiced by Pasdar.
- Iron Man is a playable character in Marvel: Future Fight.
- A teenage version of Iron Man appears in Marvel Avengers Academy, voiced by Dave Franco.
- Iron Man appears in Marvel Battle Lines, voiced again by Mick Wingert.
- Iron Man appears in Iron Man VR, voiced by Josh Keaton.
- Iron Man is a playable character in Marvel's Avengers with Nolan North voicing the role.
- Iron Man is a playable character in Marvel Future Revolution, voiced again by Eric Loomis. Many other versions of Tony Stark from alternate realities also appear as NPCs, most notably one who transformed New York City into the technologically advanced "New Stark City" and one who led an unsuccessful rebellion against Maestro on Sakaar.
- Iron Man appears in Fortnite Battle Royale Chapter 2, Season 4, titled "Nexus War" as both Tony Stark and Iron Man. His suit is the last reward of the Season's Battle Pass and is mostly responsible for defeating Galactus during the "Devourer of Worlds" live event in-game.
- Iron Man is a playable character in Marvel's Midnight Suns, voiced by Josh Keaton. In this version, Tony works in the Abbey's forge along with Doctor Strange to upgrade the heroes' gear. He attempts to destroy the last page of the Darkhold with a gamma gun, only to turn a brainwashed Bruce Banner into Smart Hulk, who steals the page for Lilith. If Tony builds a friendship with Hunter, he opens up to learning about magic and decides to found an R&D department to study the arcane for potential benefits to humanity.
- Iron Man appears as a playable character in Marvel Rivals voiced again by Josh Keaton.
- Iron Man appears as a playable character in the fighting game Marvel Tōkon: Fighting Souls, voiced by Yoshihisa Kawahara in Japanese and Josh Keaton in English. Serving as a second in-command of Fighting Avengers he dons a Shogun-Gundam RX-78-2 inspired Mark-782 armor, code name "Sho-gun".
- Marvel's Iron Man, a third-person action-adventure game starring the character is currently being developed by Motive Studio and is being published by Electronic Arts.

== Motion comics ==
- Iron Man appears in the Iron Man: Extremis motion comic, voiced by Jason Griffith.
- Iron Man appears in the Ultimate Wolverine vs. Hulk motion comic, voiced by Kirby Morrow.
- Iron Man appears in the Eternals motion comic, voiced again by Kirby Morrow.

== Books ==
The Iron Man armor is prominently featured in the book Inventing Iron Man: The Possibility of a Human Machine by E. Paul Zehr, which explores the hard science fiction aspects of Iron Man and the possibility of building an Iron Man-like armor.

Iron Man has appeared in the following novels:

Title	Author	Publisher	ISBN	Release date
Iron Man: And Call My Killer... MODOK!	William Rotsler	Pocket Books	0671820893 / 9780671820893	May 1979
Iron Man: The Armor Trap	Greg Cox	Berkley Boulevard/BPMC	1572970081 / 9781572970083	July 1995
Iron Man: Steel Terror	Dean Wesley Smith	Pocket Books/BPMC	0671003216 / 9780671003210	October 1996
Iron Man: Operation A.I.M.	Greg Cox	Berkley Boulevard/BPMC	1572971959 / 9781572971950	December 1996
Spider-Man and Iron Man: Doom's Day Book Two: Sabotage	Pierce Askegren; Danny Fingeroth	Berkley Boulevard/BPMC	1572972351 / 9781572972353	March 1997
Iron Man	Peter David	Del Rey Books	034550609X / 9780345506092	April 2008
Iron Man: Femme Fatales	Robert Greenberger	Del Rey Books	0345506855 / 9780345506856	September 29, 2009
Iron Man: Virus	Alexander C. Irvine	Del Rey Books	0345506847 / 9780345506849	January 26, 2010
Iron Man: Extremis	Marie Javins	Marvel Comics	978-0785165187	April 16, 2013
Iron Man: The Gauntlet	Eoin Colfer	Marvel Comics	978-1484741603	October 25, 2016

== Theatre ==
Iron Man appears in the Marvel Universe Live! stage show.

== Unreleased projects ==
In 1989, while the third TV-film sequel to The Incredible Hulk live-action television series was expected to co-star She-Hulk, Iron Man was being considered for both a follow-up or a solo film of his own. One year later, a film from Universal Studios to be directed by Stuart Gordon was being negotiated. This was still on the table ten months later, and also another two years on, this time with no specific director or studio attached.

== Amusement park ==
On October 8, 2013, Walt Disney Parks and Resorts chairman Thomas O. Staggs announced that Hong Kong Disneyland would be adding the Iron Man Experience, becoming the first Disney attraction to be based on a Marvel property. Set at Stark Expo, the attraction features Tony Stark recruiting guests to fend off aliens attacking Hong Kong.
