= Bashirov =

Bashirov (Russian: Баширов) is a Tatar or Azerbaijani masculine surname, its feminine counterpart is Bashirova. It may refer to

- Aleksandr Bashirov (born 1955), Russian film and theater actor and director
- Aliasker Bashirov (born 1979), Turkmen boxer

== See also ==
- Bashkirov
