= Bashkirov =

Bashkirov (Russian: Башкиров) is a Russian masculine surname, its feminine counterpart is Bashkirova. Notable people with the surname include:

- Andrei Bashkirov (born 1970), Russian ice hockey player
- Dmitri Bashkirov (1931–2021), Russian pianist and educator
- Elena Bashkirova (born 1958), Russian-born pianist and musical director, daughter of Dmitri
- Ruslan Bashkirov (born 1989), Russian ice hockey player
- Sergey Bashkirov (born 1971), Russian painter
- Yevgeni Bashkirov (born 1991), Russian football player
