= BottleRock Napa Valley =

Annual music festival in Napa, California

Coordinates: 38.29891°N 122.27872°W

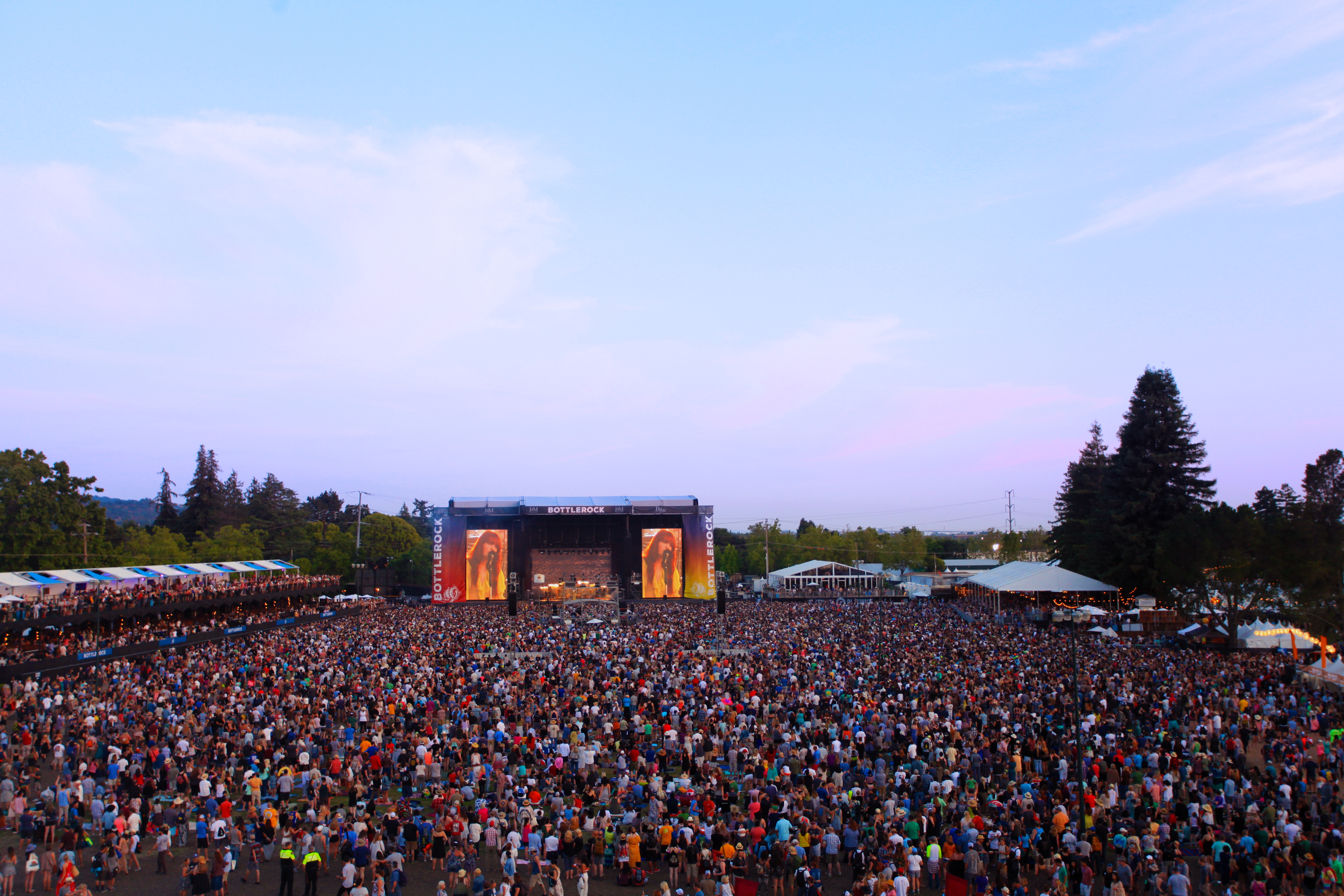
- BottleRock 2016 festival
- Status: Active
- Genre: Music festival
- Dates: May 22–24, 2026
- Frequency: Yearly (last weekend in May)
- Locations: Napa, California, United States
- Years active: 2013–2019, 2021–present
- Inaugurated: May 8, 2013
- Organizer: Latitude 38 Entertainment
- Website: bottlerocknapavalley.com

BottleRock Napa Valley is an annual music festival held at the Napa Valley Expo, usually during Memorial Day weekend, in Napa, California.

== Festivals ==
=== 2013 ===
The initial BottleRock was a five-day event that took place May 8–12, 2013. The event featured three stages with 60 bands, including Jackson Browne, Train, The Black Crowes, Zac Brown Band, The Shins, Primus, The Avett Brothers, Joan Jett, Cake, Jane's Addiction, The Flaming Lips, Kings of Leon, The Black Keys, Alabama Shakes, The Iron Heart, Ben Harper, Violent Femmes, Café Tacvba, Rodrigo y Gabriela and Charlie Musselwhite. Furthur had been scheduled, but withdrew from the lineup due to an injury and health issues suffered by Bob Weir. It was the Napa Valley's first large-scale music festival. Forty local wineries were featured at the festival. Although the festival attracted over 120,000 attendees and generated mostly positive reviews, several vendors and workers claim to have been left unpaid by organizers following the event. Estimates of well over $2.5 million for unpaid wages and services were claimed by creditors including the City of Napa, venue provider Napa Valley Expo, a variety of security, catering and transportation companies, a local of International Alliance of Theatrical Stage Employees and individuals. To resolve financial woes, subsequent festival proceeds were used to partially pay off debts.

=== 2014 ===
A 2014 concert, organized by new ownership, took place on May 30–June 1 at the Napa Valley Expo Center. The lineup of acts included The Cure, OutKast, Weezer, LL Cool J, Smash Mouth, Heart, Sublime with Rome, Third Eye Blind, De La Soul and Eric Church along with more than 45 additional artists and groups.

=== 2015 ===
The 2015 festival on May 29–31 featured headliners Imagine Dragons, Robert Plant, No Doubt, and other popular acts including Public Enemy, Gipsy Kings, Los Lobos, Foster The People, Cage The Elephant, Portugal. The Man, Los Amigos Invisibles, The Avett Brothers, and Snoop Dogg.

=== 2016 ===
The 2016 festival which took place on May 27-29th featured headliners Stevie Wonder, Florence + The Machine and Red Hot Chili Peppers along with other popular artists; The Lumineers, Death Cab for Cutie, Lenny Kravitz, Walk the Moon, Rodrigo y Gabriela, Ziggy Marley and Grouplove.

=== 2017 ===
The 2017 festival, which took place on May 26-28th, featured performers including Tom Petty & the Heartbreakers, Maroon 5, Modest Mouse, Silversun Pickups, Foo Fighters, Live, and The Roots.

=== 2018 ===
The 2018 festival, which took place on May 25-27th, featured performers including Bruno Mars, The Killers, MUSE, the Chainsmokers, Halsey, Snoop Dogg, Incubus, Earth, Wind & Fire, Natalia Lafourcade, Head and the Heart, Billy Idol, Thievery Corporation, Phantogram, Tank and the Bangas, Mike D, Michael Franti & Spearhead, and Dean Lewis.

=== 2019 ===
The 2019 festival, which took place on May 24–26, featured performers including Imagine Dragons, Neil Young, Mumford & Sons, Logic, AJR, Cypress Hill, Gang of Youths, Too $hort, Pharrell Williams, Santana, OneRepublic, Nathaniel Rateliff, Tash Sultana, Sylvan Esso, Gary Clark Jr., and Lord Huron.

=== 2021 ===
The 2020 festival, which was scheduled for October, was to include Red Hot Chili Peppers, Stevie Nicks, Dave Matthews Band, Miley Cyrus, Khalid, Anderson .Paak & The Free Nationals, Zedd, Brandi Carlile, The Avett Brothers, Janelle Monae, Maggie Rogers, Blondie, Of Monsters and Men, Maren Morris, and Empire of the Sun. In July 2020, the festival was called off due to the COVID-19 pandemic, and rescheduled for September 2021.

=== 2022 ===
The 2022 festival was headlined by Metallica, Kygo, Twenty One Pilots, The Black Crowes, P!nk and Luke Combs.

=== 2023 ===
The 2023 festival was headlined by Duran Duran, Red Hot Chili Peppers, Post Malone, Lizzo, Lil Nas X, and Smashing Pumpkins. Lizzo was the first black woman to headline the festival. She created some controversy during her performance when she called out a sign near the fairgrounds she felt was threatening.

=== 2024 ===
The 2024 festival, which took place May 24–May 26, featured over 70 performances by Stevie Nicks, Megan Thee Stallion, Pearl Jam, Maná, Ed Sheeran, Queens of the Stone Age, and The Offspring and others.

=== 2025 ===
The 2025 festival, which took place May 23–May 25, featured 80 performers. Friday's headliners were Green Day and Kaskade, Saturday's headliners were Justin Timberlake and Ice Cube, and Sunday's headliners featured Noah Kahan and Cage the Elephant.

=== 2026 ===
The 2026 festival took place between May 22–24, featuring 80 performances. It was headlined by Lorde, Teddy Swims, Lil Wayne, the Foo Fighters, LCD Soundsystem, Zedd, the Backstreet Boys, Sombr, and Ludacris.
