= The Iron Heart (band) =

American three-piece band

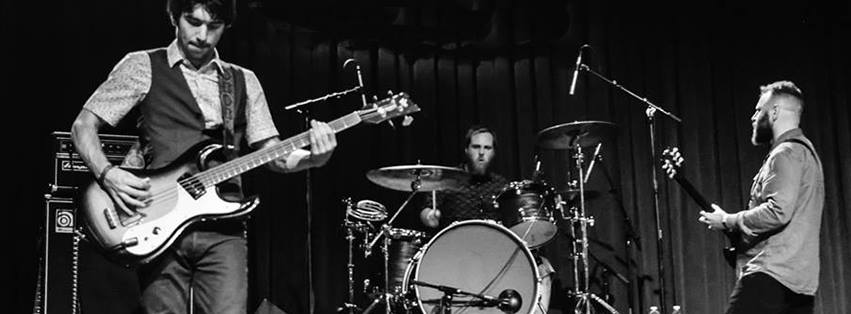
- The Iron Heart performing live at City Winery Napa on July 17, 2014; From left to right: Justin Altamura, Joel Fennie, Thomas Fine

Background information
- Origin: Napa, California, United States
- Genres: Hard rock; blues; post-grunge
- Years active: 2013–present
- Members: Justin Altamura; Joel Fennie; Thomas Fine
- Website: theironheartband.com

The Iron Heart is an American three-piece band based in Napa, California. The band officially formed in 2013; however, the members had played in various projects with each other dating back to 2000.

As The Iron Heart they have played extensively in California, including a slot on BottleRock Napa Valley 2013.

== Origins and early years ==
Thomas Fine met Justin Altamura through his older brother George. George and Fine were friends growing up, playing and learning music together. Altamura became interested in music and guitar by watching Fine and George practice and play together. Fine eventually taught Altamura how to play guitar. Joel Fennie began playing drums at an early age through lessons and playing in school. After meeting Altamura in early 2000, the duo began what would become a long-term musical relationship and have played in multiple projects together.

== Once Over ==
In 2003, while playing in the band Once Over, Altamura needed a bass player and a drummer, so he enlisted Fennie and convinced Fine to fill in as bass player. As Once Over, they released two EPs and one full-length record, toured all over the West Coast, including many spots on the Warped Tour, opened for Journey, and had many high-profile Bay Area shows with bands such as The Matches and Facing New York. During this time they had worked with producers Loren Israel (Neon Trees, Jimmy Eat World, Plain White T's) and Michael Rosen (A.F.I., Dredg, The Donnas), and they achieved moderate radio success with the singles "In Fighting & Failing", "Give it Up" and "Celebrate". Fine left the band in 2006 and Fennie followed in 2007. The group ultimately disbanded.

Between 2008 and 2012, both Altamura and Fennie played in a few projects but never got anything serious off the ground. The one constant was their pursuit of the right singer. In early 2013, Altamura was working on a school project that required him write and create a song from the ground up and document the process. He enlisted Fennie and Fine to help create the song and the trio went into record their initial demos in April 2013.

Re-energized by the music, the band began to play shows and work on new material. Their first live performance as The Iron Heart was a main stage slot on the inaugural BottleRock Napa Valley Festival (with such artists as Kings of Leon, The Black Keys, Primus, Violent Femmes among others). In September 2013, they were asked to open for George Thorogood for a sold-out show at the Uptown Theater in their hometown of Napa. Soon after, they tapped multi-platinum Grammy Award-winning producer Jason Carmer (Run DMC, The Lovemakers, Third Eye Blind) to work on their debut release.

Recorded during the winter of 2013, the band laid out five tracks that showed their songwriting prowess and their range as a band. From up-tempo heavy rockers to space-age hoe-down jams to modern0day power ballads, the EP entitled V was digitally released March 21, 2014, to positive reviews from fans and critical acclaim. The single "Woman" was featured on San Francisco radio.

The band continued to mold their sound and hone their live show, becoming one of the tighter and heavy-hitting bands from the Bay area. In September 2014, the band announced their debut album, Salon des Refuses, would be released digitally as four EPs over the next series of months, with the entire complete song collection released as a full album in late 2015. The first EP was to be recorded at Studio 606 in Los Angeles, once again with Jason Carmer at the helm.

== Members ==
- Justin Altamura – bass
- Joel Fennie – drums
- Thomas Fine – guitar, vocals

== Discography ==
- V (2014)
- Salon des Refuses (2015)

== See also ==
- List of post-grunge bands
