= List of Rave Master chapters =

In addition to changing the series name from Rave to Rave Master, the manga release from Tokyopop (right) uses a completely different cover image versus the original release (left), as seen in this comparison of the first covers.

Written and illustrated by Hiro Mashima, the chapters of the manga series Rave Master premiered in Japan in Weekly Shōnen Magazine in 1999 where it ran until its conclusion in 2005. They story follows Haru Glory's quest to save the world from the criminal organization Demon Card by collecting five holy stones called Rave, which are capable of destroying Demon Card's evil power-granting stones, the Dark Brings.

The 296 chapters individual chapters, which are numbered as "RAVE:", were collected and published in thirty-five tankōbon volumes by Kodansha, with the first volume released on November 17, 1999 and the final volume released on September 9, 2005. Rave Master was licensed for an English release in North America by Tokyopop, which released 32 volumes of the series. On August 31, 2009, Tokyopop announced that they would not be completing the series as their licenses with Kodansha expired and Kodansha required that they immediately stop publication of all previously licensed series, including Rave Master. Because of this, the series was considered to be out-of-print. The next month, it was announced that Del Rey Manga had acquired the license and would begin publishing the remaining volumes in November 2010. The last three volumes were published in a single omnibus volume. Del Rey has not re-released earlier volumes. The series is licensed for regional language releases in French by Glenat, in Spanish by Norma Editorial, and in Italian by Editions Star Comics. Egmont Manga & Anime licensed Rave Master for a German release, including serializing it in their monthly anthology Manga Power. Rave Master was one of the first manga series released in Spanish in North America by Public Square Books.

The first twelve volumes of the manga series were adapted into a 51-episode anime series by Studio Deen. The anime series, which premiered on TBS on October 13, 2001, and ran until September 28, 2002, is also licensed by Tokyopop for release and broadcast in North America.

On October 3, 2017, all 35 volumes have been re-released in North America digitally by Kodansha USA.

== Volume list ==
No.	Original release date	Original ISBN	English release date	English ISBN
1	November 17, 1999	978-4-06-312779-9	February 11, 2003	978-1-59182-064-2
1. "Opened Map" (ひらかれた地図, Hirakareta Chizu); 2. "Guiding Bell" (導きの鐘, Michibiki no Kane); 3. "Red Signal"; 4. "Stairway to the Unknown" (未知への階段, Michi e no Kaidan)
A teenager named Haru Glory lives on Garage Island with his older sister, Cattleya, after the disappearance of their father, Gale, and death of their mother, Sakura. One day, Haru fishes a mysterious dog-like creature named Plue from the ocean. He later meets Plue's former owner, Shiba Roses, an elderly warrior called the Rave Master who uses the five holy Rave stones to destroy evil stones called Dark Brings. Shiba needs Plue to find the scattered Raves and complete his quest, which he failed after his previous attempt caused an explosion called the Overdrive that destroyed one tenth of the world fifty years earlier. However, when Shiba is attacked by an agent of Demon Card, an organization that utilizes Dark Brings, he discovers that his ability to use Rave's power has been passed over to Haru, who uses Rave to defeat the agent. Haru declines the responsibility to avoid upsetting Cattleya, but is later forced to fight the high-ranking Demon Card general Shuda with Shiba's Rave-powered weapon, the Ten Powers Sword, which is broken after Haru destroys Shuda's Dark Bring. In the aftermath, Haru is motivated by Plue to leave the island and complete Shiba's mission as the new Rave Master.
2	December 15, 1999	978-4-06-312788-1	April 15, 2003	978-1-59182-065-9
5. "Travel Trouble?!" (トラベル・トラブル!?, Toraberu Toraburu!?); 6. "Dead or Alive"; 7. "Revenge as a Trio!" (トリオでREVENGE!, Torio de Revenge!); 8. "The Magic of a Smile" (笑顔の魔法, Egao no Mahō); 9. "The Legendary Blacksmith" (伝説の鍛冶屋(ブラックスミス), Densetsu no Burakkusumisu); 10. "The Wandering Fallen Angel" (彷徨の堕天使, Hōkō no Datenshi); 11. "From the Broken Door" (壊れた扉から, Kowareta Tobira kara); 12. "The Inheritance" (受け継がれるもの, Uketsugareru Mono); 13. "The Bridge of Promises" (約束の橋, Yakusoku no Hashi)
Haru and Plue search the Song Continent for the blacksmith Musica to repair the Ten Powers. At Hip Hop Town, Plue is stolen from Haru and forced onto a dog racing track owned by Demon Card. Haru rescues Plue with help from an amnesiac teenager named Elie, who joins their travels to recover her memory. At the city of Punk Street, Haru and Elie separately meet two different men named Musica—Galein Musica, an old drunkard who claims to be the blacksmith, and Hamrio Musica, the teenage leader of the Silver Rhythm Gang—both of whom are unfamiliar with each other. Shortly after Haru entrusts his sword and Rave to Galein, Demon Card commander Lance holds Elie hostage and challenges Haru to a fight, threatening to kill Elie in two hours. Hamrio distracts Lance for Haru to retrieve his sword from Galein, who confesses that he renounced blacksmithing after forging the sword Lance used to murder the Musica family. Upon learning that Haru intends to fight Lance, Galein reforges the Ten Powers in time for Haru to rescue Elie.
3	February 17, 2000	978-4-06-312806-2	June 17, 2003	978-1-59182-210-3
14. "Approaching Darkness" (そびえ立つ闇, Sobietatsu Yami); 15. "Shot to the Heart" (魂がきざむ刻, Tamashii ga Kizamu Toki); 16. "Feel the Burn" (放熱の行方, Hōnetsu no Yukue); 17. "Sweet Dream & Bitter Kisses" (憩いの影に, Ikoi no Kage ni); 18. "Good Morning Sunshine" (それぞれの明日, Sorezore no Ashita); 19. "Out of the Plue" (ヒステリック・プルー!?, Hisuterikku Purū!?); 20. "The Coldest Rain" (世界で一番冷たい雨, Sekai de Ichiban Tsumetai Ame); 21. "Gray Clouds Over My Heart" (晴れない心たち, Harenai Kokoro Tachi)
Haru is outmatched by Lance, whose sword is embedded with a Dark Bring that creates physical illusions. Fearing Haru's defeat, Galein tries to sacrifice himself to help Haru defeat Lance, but Haru instead destroys the Dark Bring and Lance's sword. With Haru injured from the effects of the Ten Powers' Explosion form, Hamrio uses his powers as a Silverclaimer, an alchemist with control over silver, to defeat Lance's men. Later that night, Haru realizes that Hamrio is Galein's grandson and only surviving relative. The two Musicas come to the same conclusion, but choose not to reveal themselves to each other and happily part ways. Transported by a gelatinous creature named Griffon "Griff" Kato, Haru's group takes refuge at Ska Village, which has suffered from endless rainfall for the past five years. Upon hearing that the storm was caused by a "man of thunder", Elie leaves alone to find him, believing him to be a tattoo-faced man who attacked her with lightning in her earliest memory.
4	May 17, 2000	978-4-06-312841-3	August 12, 2003	978-1-59182-211-0
22. "Haru Gets Down!" (ダンシング・ヒーロー!?, Danshingu Hīrō!?); 23. "Boppin' with Elie!" (エリー de ルンバ!, Erī de Runba!); 24. "Last Scene" (ラストシーン, Rasuto Shīn); 25. "Gentle Sunlight" (優しい陽射し, Yasashii Hizashi); 26. "Viva la Labyrinth!" (ビバ・ラビリンス!, Biba Rabirinsu!); 27. "Fade to Black" (しのびよる落とし穴(ブラックホール), Shinobi Yoru Burakku Hōru); 28. "Chameleon Panic?!" (カメレオン・パニック!?, Kamereon Panikku!?); 29. "Open Sesame?!" (ひらけGOMA!?, Hirake Goma!?); 30. "The Truth About Rave" (レイヴの真実, Reivu no Shinjitsu)
Elie meets the "man of thunder" and realizes he is a complete stranger named Go Rockwell, a lightning-wielding Demon Card member and film director who has been using a rain machine for the production of a movie. A series of further misunderstandings leads to Haru and Elie battling Go and his girlfriend, Rosa Splash, until Go's Dark Bring is destroyed, freeing him from the stone's evil influence. Go and Rosa decide to stop the rain and change their ways, identifying the tattoo-faced man as a master of elemental magic. Haru's group continues their journey to Tremolo Mountain, where Shuda and his men are searching for the Rave of Knowledge. Haru's group is deceived by Dr. Schneider, an assassin hired by Shuda to kill Haru, but they are saved and joined by Hamrio Musica, who has come to claim the Rave as his own treasure. The group finds a hidden chamber where they are greeted by the reincarnated spirit of Deerhound—one of Shiba's comrades, the Knights of the Blue Sky—who entrusts the Rave to Haru.
5	July 17, 2000	978-4-06-312860-4	October 14, 2003	978-1-59182-212-7
31. "Vow of the Soul" (魂の誓い, Tamashii no Chikai); 32. "Break These Chains" (汚れた絆, Kegareta Kizuna); 33. "Distant Promise" (遠い約束, Tōi Yakusoku); 34. "Fierce Pride" (猛き誇り(プライド), Mōki Puraido); 35. "Sad Skies" (哀しい空, Kanashii Sora); 36. "An Iron Heart" (折れない心, Orenai Kokoro); 37. "Imperfect Future" (さかまく未来, Sakamaku Mirai); 38. "Ripples of Fate" (運命のさざなみ, Unmei no Sazanami); 39. "Elie and Resha" (エリーとリーシャ, Erī to Rīsha)
Using the Rave of Knowledge, Haru unlocks the Ten Powers' Silfarion form and defeats Schneider, allowing Deerhound's spirit to depart for the afterlife with his duty fulfilled. Haru's group is then attacked by Shuda, who battles Haru atop his airship while Elie and Musica face his henchmen. Shuda reveals his former friendship with Gale, whom he wishes to surpass by killing Haru, but is defeated and willingly falls to his apparent death. Their battle triggers the airship's self-destruct system, but Haru's group escapes with the help of the Silver Rhythm Gang. News of Shuda's defeat reaches Demon Card's leader, King, who orders his subordinate Sieg Hart, the tattoo-faced man, to kill Haru. Harboring no loyalty to Demon Card, Sieg Hart instead prioritizes his hunt for Elie, codenamed "3173", who possesses a destructive power called Etherion. Sieg Hart finds Elie during her group's trip to a museum in the city of Experiment, where she experiences one of her lost memories upon seeing a portrait of Resha Valentine, an identical-looking girl who died fifty years earlier.
6	September 14, 2000	978-4-06-312884-0	December 9, 2003	978-1-59182-213-4
40. "Catastrophe?!" (悲劇の結末(カタストロフィー)!?, Katasutorofī!?); 41. "The Sun in My Heart" (心の太陽, Kokoro no Taiyō); 42. "Words of Life" (命のことば, Inochi no Kotoba); 43. "The Knock of Despair!" (絶望の足音!?, Zetsubō no Ashioto!?); 44. "For Elie's Sake" (エリーのために, Erī no Tame ni); 45. "The Trigger of Destruction" (破滅への引鉄, Hametsu e no Hikigane); 46. "The Final Risk" (最後の賭け, Saigo no Kake); 47. "Hold Tight to the Moment" (今日を抱きしめて, Kyō o Dakishimete); Rave 0065: "Plue's Commando Diary" (プルーの特攻日記?, Purū no Tokkō Nikki?)
Sieg Hart claims that Elie is a human test subject from an experiment designed to imbue humans with Etherion, which could only be controlled by its natural inheritor and Rave's creator, Resha. He attempts to kill Elie before Etherion is activated, fearing it will disrupt the timestream and end the world, but her power prevents her from dying. He is interrupted by Haru, who furiously battles him and awakens his sword's Rune Save form, which allows him to counter Sieg Hart's spells. Sieg Hart traps Haru within a mind-torturing spell, but is backstabbed by his comrade Reina—one of Demon Card's top-ranked Oracion Six generals—for betraying their organization. Elie rescues Haru during the confrontation, only to lose control of Etherion in the process. Haru successfully seals Etherion with Rune Save, forcing Sieg Hart to question his own beliefs. The Oracion Six's Jegan retrieves Reina while Sieg Hart departs peacefully after informing Haru of another Rave's location on the Luka Continent.
7	November 16, 2000	978-4-06-312904-5	February 3, 2004	978-1-59182-517-3
48. "The Longest Day in Musica's Life" (ムジカの一番長い日, Mujika no Ichiban Nagai hi); 49. "Go For It, Jiggle Butt Gang!" (それゆけ! ケツプリ団!!, Soreyuke! Ketsupuri-dan!!); 50. "City in the Holy Force Field" (結界の都, Kekkai no Miyako); 51. "Steel Determination" (鋼の決意, Hagane no Ketsui); 52. "Stupid Dad" ("父ちゃん"なんて, "Tō-chan" Nante); 53. "Wandering Bonds" (さまよう絆, Samayō Kizuna); 54. "Gale and Gale" (ゲイルとゲイル, Geiru to Geiru); 55. "The Day Time Intersects" (時の交わる日, Toki no Majiwaru Hi); 56. "Smoke Signals for a Bloody Battle" (血戦の狼煙, Kessen no Noroshi)
Musica permanently joins Haru's group to help them find the remaining Raves, forgoing a rekindled romance with his ex-girlfriend, whom he left to pursue a mysterious ship. After unknowingly foiling the Jiggle Butt Gang's attempt to rob their train to Luka, the group enters the underground city of Rabarrier, where its citizens have been fighting an army of creatures called demonoids to protect the Rave of Combat. Haru declines the resistance's request for an alliance when he hears that Gale is the demonoids' leader, leaving to confront Gale alone instead. After defeating the demonoid army outside the nearby Tower of Din, Haru encounters two different men named Gale: his father, who rescues the wounded Haru; and the actual enemy, Gale Raregroove, who is revealed to be King's true identity and Gale Glory's nemesis. Haru and his father storm the tower together to defeat King before he can complete the Enclaim, a ritual for creating Dark Brings.
8	January 17, 2001	978-4-06-312925-0	April 6, 2004	978-1-59182-518-0
57. "A Pair of Kings" (ふたりの"KING", Futari no "Kingu"); 58. "Final Countdown?!" (ファイナル・カウントダウン!?, Fainaru Kauntodaun!?); 59. "Infinite Resolve" (無限の覚悟, Mugen no Kakugo); 60. "Thoughts of Tomorrow" (明日に架ける想い, Asu ni Kakeru Omoi); 61. "Unyielding Faith" (不屈の信念, Fukutsu no Shinnen); 62. "Seeking the Light" (光を求めて, Hikari o Motome te); 63. "Entrusted Future" (たくされた未来, Takusareta Mirai); 64. "King's Ultimate Goal!" (キングの最終目的!, Kingu no Saishū Mokuteki!)
Haru and Gale are separated within the Tower of Din's moving walls, forcing Gale to face King alone. Haru reunites with his friends and their allies from Rabarrier while being attacked by King's Five Palace Guardians, who battle the group across different pocket dimensions. During the battle, Haru unlocks the Ten Powers' Blue Crimson form to defeat one of the guardians, Let, a member of the Dragon Race. After the other guardians are defeated, Musica returns everyone to the real world by defeating the lead guardian, Ltiangle, leaving him gravely wounded. As the group leaves the tower to treat Musica, they meet the departing spirit of Clea Maltese, one of the Knights of the Blue Sky, who tasks Elie with delivering the Rave of Combat under her protection to Haru. Meanwhile, Haru rejoins Gale shortly before King finishes the Enclaim and activates "End of Earth", a Dark Bring capable of triggering another Overdrive, which he has embedded within Gale's body.
9	March 16, 2001	978-4-06-312950-2	June 1, 2004	978-1-59182-519-7
65. "A Button in the Wrong Hole" (かけちがえたボタン, Kakechigaeta Botan); 66. "At the Edge of Hate" (憎しみの果てに, Nikushimi no Hate ni); 67. "A Reason to Fight" (戦う理由, Tatakau Wake); 68. "The Rave of Combat" (闘争のレイヴ, Tōsō no Reivu); 69. "Evil Runs Reckless" (邪の暴走, Jiya no Bōsō); 70. "Judge of 'Time'" ("時"の審判, "Toki" no Shinpan); 71. "Overflow" (こぼれおちるもの, Koboreochiru Mono); 72. "As a Dad" (父として, Chichi Toshite); 73. "Eternal Bonds" (永遠の絆, Eien no Kizuna)
Twenty-five years in the past, Demon Card is founded by Gale and King to protect humanity from monsters, but Gale eventually retires and starts a family with Sakura on Garage Island. Years later, King falls under the Dark Brings' influence and turns Demon Card into a criminal organization. After failing to reason with King, Gale contacts the governing empire's army to have him arrested; against Gale's wishes, the army also raids his headquarters, leading to the loss of King's wife and son. Consumed with hatred for Gale, King vengefully murders Sakura and plants the inactive End of Earth inside Gale's head. Back in the present, Haru and Gale defeat King after Haru obtains the Rave of Combat from Elie and achieves the Ten Powers' Mel Force form. Returning to his senses, King destroys Demon Card's headquarters by warping "End of Earth" there before committing suicide. Haru's group escapes from the collapsing Tower of Din, but Gale sacrifices his life to protect Haru from falling debris. Haru mourns his father's death before resolving to continue his journey.
10	May 17, 2001	978-4-06-312969-4	August 3, 2004	978-1-59182-520-3
Rave 0015: "Knights of Kingdom Part 1" (Knights of Kingdom 前編, Naitsu obu Kingudamu Zenpen); Rave 0015: "Knights of Kingdom Part 2" (Knights of Kingdom 後編, Naitsu obu Kingudamu Kōhen); 74. "A Brand New Start!" (新しいスタート!, Atarashii Sutāto!); 75. "The Side Roads Are Full of Danger?!" (寄り道はキケンがいっぱい!?, Yorimichi wa Kiken ga Ippai!?); 76. "The Dark's Oppressive Regime" (闇の覇道, Yami no Hadō); 77. "Bad People" (悪い人たち, Warui Hito-tachi); 78. "The Coming of the 'Storm'" ("嵐"の幕開け, "Arashi" no Makuake); 79. "Busting Through!!" (強行突破!!, Kyōkō Toppa!!)
Fifty-one years in the past, Shiba enlists in the army of Symphonia in their war against the Raregroove Kingdom. He befriends Resha shortly before she dies from using Etherion to create Rave, which she entrusts to him as her final request. Back in the present, six months after Gale and King's deaths, Let joins Haru's group as they disembark to Star Memory, a mystical place rumored to hold the answers to their questions. In need of funds for their voyage, they board a passing casino airship owned by the penguin sentinoid Ruby. There they come into conflict with Ruby's bodyguards from the Doryu Ghost Attack Squad, a criminal organization that seeks to fill the power vacuum left by Demon Card's destruction, and the Jiggle Butt Gang, who are attempting another robbery. After Haru's group escapes during the chaos, Ruby joins them as their sponsor and grants them passage through Symphonia.
11	August 10, 2001	978-4-06-313008-9	October 5, 2004	978-1-59182-521-0
80. "Footsteps of the 'Demon'" ("悪魔"の足音, "Akuma" no Ashioto); 81. "The Voice of Symphonia" (シンフォニアの声, Shinfonia no Koe); 82. "Toward the Vortex of Chaos" (混沌(カオス)の渦へ, Kaosu no Uzu e); 83. "Predestined Encounter" (めぐりあう"運命", Meguriau "Sadame"); 84. "Because We're Friends" (仲間だから, Nakama Dakara); 85. "The Tragic Dragon Race" (哀しき竜人(ドラゴンレイス), Kanashiki Doragon Reisu); 86. "The Truth About Julia" (ジュリアの真実, Juria no Shinjitsu); 87. "Silver Ray" (シルバーレイ, Shirubā Rei); 88. "Silver Claimer's Reminiscence" (追憶の銀術師(シルバークレイマー), Tsuioku no Shirubā Kureimā)
Haru's group reaches the destroyed land of Symphonia, where they find a world map with the locations of the Raves and their Dark Bring counterparts, Sinclaire. They are immediately found by the Dark Bring Master, a blond teenage swordsman and escaped convict from the maximum-security prison Mega Unit, who takes interest in Elie for having Etherion. The Dark Bring Master leaves Haru's group to be ambushed by the Oracion Six, who avoided the destruction of Demon Card's headquarters and seek to kill Elie to prevent the Dark Bring Master from exploiting Etherion. Let tries to take revenge against Jegan for the murder of his girlfriend, Julia, but falters when Jegan's dragon is revealed to be a transformed and mindless Julia, whose love Jegan sought for himself. As Jegan defeats Let, Reina interrogates Musica over the location of the Silver Ray, the ship and weapon Musica has been searching for, which Reina believes to have been stolen by Musica's deceased mentor after her father was wrongfully executed for the crime.
12	September 17, 2001	978-4-06-313019-5	December 7, 2004	978-1-59182-522-7
89. "Pronouncement of Execution" (死刑宣告, Shikei Senkoku); 90. "Sacrifice, or Awakening?!" (犠牲､ そして覚醒!?, Gisei, Soshite Kakusei!?); 91. "To the Limits of Chaos" (混沌(カオス)の果てに, Kaosu no Hate ni); 92. "Key to the Future" (未来への鍵, Mirai e no Kagi); 93. "Dark Ascension" (闇の継承, Yami no Keishō); 94. "Memory Door" (記憶の扉, Kioku no Tobira); 95. "Twilight Vow" (誓いの夕暮れ, Chikai no Yūgure); 96. "The Search for Alice!" (アリスを探せ!, Arisu o Sagase!); 97. "Acappella Island: Our Future Revealed?!" (未来を照らすはアカペラ島!?, Mirai o Terasu wa Akapera-tō!?)
Reina defeats Musica while Haru and Elie are overpowered by the Oracion Six members Berial, Iulius, and Haja. The fight is stopped by Sieg Hart, forcing the Oracion Six to retreat to their base. There they encounter the Dark Bring Master, who is revealed to be Lucia Raregroove, King's son and heir. Sieg Hart encourages Elie to master Etherion in order to combine the five Raves against Lucia's Sinclaire, having learned that her power is not the product of a human experiment as he previously believed. Using the invisible tattoos on Elie's arm, Sieg Hart finds the geographic coordinates to Resha's grave, which is guarded by a human skeleton wearing a pendant belonging to Elie. Elie regains memories of her childhood, including her ability to use Etherion at a young age, as well as her companionship with a man named Kaim. After parting with Sieg Hart and receiving healing elixirs from the pharmacist Alice, Haru's group visits the nearby Acappella Island to consult the prophet Saga Pendragon, who instructs them to travel south for the next Rave.
13	November 16, 2001	978-4-06-313042-3	February 8, 2005	978-1-59532-018-6
98. "To Southernberg!" (サザンベルクへ!, Sazanberuku e!); 99. "Darkness, Reborn" (闇の新生, Yami no Shinsei); 100. "Time to Synchro" (シンクロする刻, Shinkuro Suru Toki); 101. "To the Never-ending Future" (終わりなき未来へ, Owarinaki Mirai e); 102. "Belly of the Beast" (うごめく野望, Ugomeku Yabō); 103. "Last Dance of the Mermaids" (妖精の舞う海, Yōsei no Mau Umi); 104. "1 Gram Peace" (1gの平和, Ichi Guramu no Heiwa); 105. "Cruelty of the Oni" (鬼の非道, Oni no Hidō)
Lucia assumes leadership of Demon Card and sends Reina and Jegan to search for the two pieces of Sinclaire on the Southernberg Continent, where the fourth Rave is also located. Along the way, Haru's group is forced to give up their food supplies to escape a monster-inhabited cave. While diving for fish in a lake, Haru rescues the mermaid Celia from being stuck in a hole. Celia brings the group to her home village of Mildesta out of gratitude, but they find the village has been attacked by oni from the criminal group Onigami, who have formed an alliance with the Doryu Ghost Attack Squad against Demon Card. Celia's older sister explains that the oni have kidnapped all the other merpeople in Mildesta to harvest their magic energy for a destructive weapon called the Mermaid Cannon. Joined by Celia, Haru's group sets out to rescue the merpeople from Onigami's hideout, Syaoran.
14	January 17, 2002	978-4-06-313065-2	April 12, 2005	978-1-59532-019-3
106. "Infiltrating Syaoran!" (宵藍(シャオラン)潜入!, Shaoran Sennyū!); 107. "The Future Is in Griff's Hands!?" (未来はグリフの手の中!?, Mirai wa Gurifu no Te no Naka!?); 108. "Mad Dash?!" (頼りなき疾走!?, Tayori naki Shissō!?); 109. "No One's Gonna Die on Me!!" (誰も死ぬな!!!!, Dare mo Shinu na!!!!); 110. "The Two Demon Kings" (2人の魔王, Futari no Maō); 111. "Despair Repeated?!" (くり返す絶望!?, Kuri Kaesu Zetsubō!?); 112. "The Power of Sorrow" (悲しい魔力, Kanashii Maryoku); 113. "A Thorny Decision" (荊棘の選択, Ibara no Sentaku); 114. "Ultimate Dark" (悠久の闇(アルティメット・ダーク), Arutimetto Dāku)
Haru distracts the Onigami army for his friends to infiltrate Syaoran, activating his Ten Powers' Gravity Core form in the process. The group is imprisoned shortly upon arrival, but Plue and Griff take advantage of their height to help the group escape with the help of Onigami's chef, a member of Griff's species named Unicorn "Uni" Watanabe. After being freed, Celia releases the other merpeople, who assist Haru and his friends in defeating the oni. The group is then confronted by the Sinclaire users Pumpkin Doryu and Ogre—the leaders of the Ghost Attack Squad and Onigami, respectively—who capture Elie and Ruby after Doryu defeats Musica, leaving no trace of him. Using Elie's Etherion to replace the lost merpeople's magic, Onigami fires their Mermaid Cannon to destroy Haru's group along with Syaoran. However, Elie takes control of the blast, allowing Haru to deflect the attack. In response, Doryu traps Haru's group aboard his airship, Creature.
15	March 15, 2002	978-4-06-313085-0	June 7, 2005	978-1-59532-020-9
115. "The Power of Light and Dark" (光と闇の属性, Hikari to Yami no Zokusei); 116. "The Secret Lives of Wolves" (生の代償, Sei no Daishō); 117. "Because We're a Team" (仲間だから, Nakama Dakara); 118. "That's Cruel, Poyo!!" (ひどいポヨ!!, Hidoi Poyo!!); 119. "Mermaid in Love" (恋する人魚, Koisuru Ningyo); 120. "Darkness Falls" ("夜"の導き, "Yoru" no Michibiki); 121. "Darkness Rising" (螺旋の標, Rasen no Shirube); 122. "Our Hope, Extinguished" (希望消失!?, Kibō Shōshitsu!?)
Haru's group navigates the five sectors of Creature, each guarded by one of Doryu's soldiers. They first defeat the zombie Cookie Crusher and the mad scientist Mummy, with the latter having transformed Musica into a werewolf, whom Haru restores to human form by giving him one of Alice's elixirs. They then travel to Ruby's cell, where he is tricked by his former bodyguard Lilith Nina into signing his fortune over to Doryu. Celia remains behind and defeats Lilith while the others encounter Doryu's strongest warrior, Orochi, who is quickly killed from afar by Jegan. Musica defeats Franken Billy, another of Ruby's ex-bodyguards, and questions him about the Silver Ray, which he had overheard during his time as a werewolf. At the center of Creature, Plue, Griff, and Uni travel ahead to search for Elie, leaving Haru and Ruby to face Doryu, who defeats Haru with the power of his Sinclaire and magical Twilight Sword.
16	May 17, 2002	978-4-06-363106-7	August 9, 2005	978-1-59532-021-6
123. "Doryu's Dark Designs" (闇の侵食, Yami no Shinshoku); 124. "Cruel Revelation" (残酷なる変貌, Zankoku naru Henbō); 125. "Silverclaimer Duet" (2人の銀術師(シルバークレイマー), Futari no Shirubākureimā); 126. "Return of the Silver Ray" (シルバーレイ､ 再び!, Shirubā Rei, Futatabi!); 127. "Bonds of Silver" (紲の銀, Kizuna no Gin); 128. "Reina's Heart" (レイナの心, Reina no Kokoro); 129. "Overlapping Lives" (命重ねて, Inochi Kasanete)
Ruby awakens his magic powers to save Haru with the help of Dalmatian, one of the Knights of the Blue Sky. Despite his life-threatening injuries left from Doryu's Twilight Sword, Haru leaves Dalmatian's care to fight Doryu again. Meanwhile, Musica searches for the Silver Ray in River Saly, Onigami's underwater fortress, where Reina's forces are battling Ogre's oni army. Realizing the fortress itself is the Silver Ray, Musica and Reina form a truce to reclaim it from Ogre—revealed to be the culprit who stole the Silver Ray and framed Reina's father—who programs the weapon to annihilate Southernberg. With Ogre's Sinclaire and Goldclaimer abilities making him impervious to Musica and Reina's silver weapons, the two defeat him with the magical attack Silver Bonds, a technique that relies on mutual trust. Unable to deactivate the Silver Ray, Reina sacrifices herself to destroy the weapon with Silver Bonds, pushing Musica to safety and entrusting him with a spear made from the Silver Ray's remains.
17	July 17, 2002	978-4-06-363122-7	October 11, 2005	978-1-59532-022-3
130. "Bonds of 'Light'" ("光"の絆, "Hikari" no Kizuna); 131. "Door to the Nightmare" (悪夢の扉, Akumu no Tobira); 132. "Black Soul" (黒い心, Kuroi Kokoro); 133. "Shattered Dreams" (ちぎれた夢, Chigireta Yume); 134. "Soul of the Demon, Reborn" (蘇る魔の魂(こえ), Yomigaeru Ma no Koe); 135. "'Light's' Trump Card" ("光"の切り札, "Hikari" no Kirifuda); 136. "Linked Souls..." (心繋いで...., Kokoro Tsunai de....); 137. "Believe in Rave" (レイヴを信じて, Reivu o Shinjite)
Elie reunites with Haru and the others after she is rescued by Plue's group, and together they confront Doryu, who is momentarily weakened by Ruby's magic. During the battle, Doryu is revealed to have once established a town where humans and sentinoids could coexist; however, the humans' prejudice against sentinoids flared after a young sentinoid accidentally injured a human child, eventually resulting in the humans driving the sentinoids out and imprisoning Doryu, who then acquired his Sinclaire piece and destroyed the town in revenge. Provoked by Haru and his friends' pity for him, Doryu absorbs the surrounding darkness in the area to assume his true form as a Demon Lord, a ruler of the sentinoids' homeworld, the Mystic Realm. Haru uses his Ten Powers' Million Suns form to counteract Doryu's dark magic, allowing him to defeat Doryu, but appears to fade away from the injuries he sustained from their previous battle.
18	September 17, 2002	978-4-06-363144-9	December 13, 2005	978-1-59532-023-0
138. "The Power to Live" (生きる力, Ikiru Chikara); 139. "A Kind Miracle" (優しい奇蹟, Yasashii Kiseki); 140. "Smiling Towards Tomorrow" (笑顔の明日へ, Egao no Ashita e); 141. "The Will of Rave" (レイヴの意志, Reivu no Ishi); 142. "Project DR" (プロジェクトDR, Purojekuto Dī Āru); 143. "Are These Guys Stupid or What?!" (まぬけな人たち!?, Manuke na Hito-tachi!?); 144. "Next Stop – The Jiggle Butt Zone" (ケツプリ番外地, Ketsupuri Bangaichi); 145. "Inspecting the Horror" (戦慄のしらべ, Senritsu no Shirabe); 146. "Fate of the Dragon Race" (宿命の竜人(ドラゴンレイス), Shukumei no Doragon Reisu)
Dalmatian reveals he has pulled Haru into a mystical light to heal him from Doryu's dark magic, saving his life. Haru's group rests at Mildesta before departing with Doryu's Sinclaire in their possession, saying goodbye to Celia and Uni. They then have a final meeting with Dalmatian, whose spirit departs after bestowing Haru with the Rave of Destiny, a means of communicating with Saga. The group travels to the Iima Continent in search of the fifth and last remaining Rave, the Rave of Truth, but is intercepted by Jegan, who attacks with a swarm of dragons to claim the Sinclaire. Meanwhile, Jegan recovers Ogre's Sinclaire while Demon Card's forces destroy the imperial capital and form an alliance with other villainous groups: the Blue Guardians, a sky pirate crew captained by the Sinclaire user Hardner; the four Great Demon Lords, including another Sinclaire user, Asura; and Shakuma, the world's mightiest sorcerer and mentor to Haja, the strongest of the Oracion Six.
19	November 15, 2002	978-4-06-363165-4	March 7, 2006	978-1-59532-024-7
147. "Let's Resolve" (レットの執念, Retto no Shūnen); 148. "The Appointed Hour" (予言の刻, Yogen no Toki); 149. "Final Battle" (最後の戦, Saigo no Ikusa); 150. "Irreplaceable Heart" (かけがえなきもの, Kakegaenaki Mono); 151. "An Unjust World" (歪んだ世界, Yuganda Sekai); 152. "Hapless Hero" (裸の英雄(ヒーロー)!?, Hadaka no Hīrō!?); 153. "Fist of Justice" (正義の拳, Seigi no Kobushi); 154. "Guiding Flame" (炎の導き, Honō no Michibiki); 155. "A Matter of Pride" (誇りを賭けた戦い, Hokori o Kaketa Tatakai)
Let remains behind to battle Jegan for the rest of Haru's group to flee from Jegan's dragons. Using a forbidden Dragon Race technique that forfeits his life, Let defeats Jegan and feeds Julia with an elixir that restores her to her original form. Julia saves Let by passing half of the elixir to him through a kiss, while Jegan washes ashore to the nearby city of Wrist Dome, where he is persuaded by his brother, the imperial general Jeid, to start a new life. However, Jegan is killed when Shakuma destroys Wrist Dome while Haja confiscates the Sinclaire in Jegan's possession. Jegan's mission is continued by Deep Snow, Shuda's replacement in the Oracion Six and a Demon Card operative from within the empire. When Deep Snow's forces ambush Haru's group, Shuda returns and kills Deep Snow's minions with the exception of the misguided Lazenby, who is taken away by Haru.
20	February 17, 2003	978-4-06-363201-9	June 13, 2006	978-1-59532-025-4
156. "Fire and Water" (炎と水と...., Honō to Mizu to....); 157. "The Forbidden Power" (禁じられた力, Kinjirareta Chikara); 158. "A Warrior's Pledge" (戦士の約束, Senshi no Yakusoku); 159. "Key to the World" (世界の鍵, Sekai no Kagi); 160. "Voice of the Star Vestige" ("星跡"の声, "Hoshiato" no Koe); 161. "Life of a Star" (星の命, Hoshi no Inochi); 162. "Haru vs. Lucia" (ハル VS ルシア, Haru VS Rushia); 163. "Souls, Determined unto Death" (決死の魂, Kesshi no Tamashii); 164. "The Demon Sword, Berserk?!" (魔剣の暴走!?, Maken no Bōsō!?)
Shuda and Deep Snow duel each other, both having devoted their lives to Gale and King's wills, respectively. Using a divine magic sword entrusted to him by Gale, Shuda defeats Deep Snow but spares his life, revealing King's desire for Deep Snow to live peacefully. Following Shuda's advice, Haru's group reaches the cave of the Star Vestige, where they meet Evermary, Gale's foster father. Everymary shows them the memories stored in the Star Vestige, through which they learn that Demon Card has been destroying resistance armies and nations around the world since overthrowing the empire, leading Lazenby to have a change of heart. Lucia later appears and destroys the stored memories, having come to kidnap Elie and claim the final Sinclaire for himself. Haru easily defeats Lucia with the Ten Powers' ninth form, the demon sword Sacrifar, which seals Haru's emotions except for aggression, causing him to threaten the lives of his friends.
21	April 17, 2003	978-4-06-363224-8	August 29, 2006	978-1-59532-026-1
165. "Premonition of a Slaughter" (殺戮の予感, Satsuriku no Yokan); 166. "Demonic Carnage" (悪鬼羅刹, Akki Rasetsu); 167. "True Fist" (本能の拳, Honnō no Kobushi); 168. "A Never-ending Beginning" (終わりなき始まり!?, Owarinaki Hajimari!?); 169. "The Unknown Door" (未知なる扉, Michi naru Tobira); 170. "The Truth About Endless" (エンドレスの真実, Endoresu no Shinjitsu); 171. "Time of Betrayal" (裏切りの"時", Uragiri no 'Toki"); 172. "Shifting Truths" (移ろう真実, Utsurō Shinjitsu); 173. "The Just Revolt" (正義への反逆, Seigi e no Hangyaku)
Elie and Plue disarm Haru before he can kill Lucia and lose his sanity. However, Lucia recovers and reveals he can also use Sacrifar with his Decalogue, a Dark Bring that imitates the Ten Powers. Shuda persuades Lucia to spare Haru by giving him Doryu's Sinclaire, but is stabbed by Lucia in the process. Haru defeats Lucia again with his bare fists, but cannot bring himself to kill him. Their battle awakens Endless, an immortal monster born from Star Memory that was sealed beneath the Star Vestige, but it is stopped by the Demon Lord Megido, who rescues Lucia. As Haru's group recovers, they learn from Saga that Endless can only be destroyed by Elie's Etherion once Star Memory is unlocked. Meanwhile, Sieg Hart returns to his hometown of Mildian to recruit allies against Haja, but finds that the townspeople have sided with Haja and is imprisoned for failing to kill Elie. Aided by the young mage Niebel, his only supporter in the town, Sieg Hart escapes and defeats the townspeople before facing Haja.
22	June 17, 2003	978-4-06-363249-1	December 12, 2006	978-1-59532-626-3
174. "Infinite Terror" ("無限"の戦慄, "Mugen" no Senritsu); 175. "Toward a New Time" (新たなる"時"へ, Arata naru "Toki" e); 176. "Surpassing the Infinite" ("無限"を超えて, "Mugen" o Koete); 177. "The End of Time" ("時"の結末, "Toki" no Ketsumatsu); 178. "Beyond the Smile..." (笑顔の奥に...., Egao no Oku ni....); 179. "Village of the Dance?!" (思惑が踊る村!?, Omowaku ga Odoru Mura!?); 180. "Swaying Hearts" (揺れる心たち, Yureru Kokoro-tachi); 181. "Dawn of the Dance Contest" (舞踊大会の朝, Buyō Taikai no Asa); 182. "The Actors Are Assembled!" (役者はそろった!?, Yakusha wa Soretta!?)
Haja reveals his ambition to overthrow Demon Card and rule the world using a forbidden magic sealed beneath Mildian. Sieg Hart drives himself to exhaustion in a week-long duel with Haja, inspiring his former comrades into taking Sieg Hart's side. Eventually, Sieg Hart kills Haja with his master's wooden staff and recovers the last Sinclaire from him. Meanwhile, Haru's group decides to compete in a dance contest at the village of Ribeyla and use its prize money to continue their journey. There, Haru is outraged to learn that one of their competitors is Cattleya's abusive ex-boyfriend, Branch, who is also a Demon Card captain. On the day of the contest, Musica discovers that Branch's dance partner, Mika, is an assassin who is targeting the contest champion, Iulius, and attempts to stop her to prevent a panic. Elie enters with Lazenby as her partner, but Branch sabotages them by giving Lazenby a laxative shortly before their turn.
23	August 12, 2003	978-4-06-363272-9	February 27, 2007	978-1-59532-627-0
183. "A Lonely Step" (孤独なステップ, Kodoku na Suteppu); 184. "Miraculous Dance" (奇跡の舞, Kiseki no Mai); 185. "Iulius Decided This?!" (ユリウスの決断!?, Yuriusu no Ketsudan!?); 186. "Seed of Evil Intent" (悪意の種, Akui no Tane); 187. "The Soul of Ribeyla" (リベイラの魂, Ribeira no Tamashii); 188. "Branch's Ambition" (ブランチの野望, Buranchi no Yabō); 189. "The Gateway to Hell?!" (地獄の入り口!?, Jigoku no Iriguchi!?); 190. "Life or Death?" (今を生きて, Ima o Ikite); 191. "Invincible Rage" (無敵の怒り, Muteki no Ikari)
With Lazenby incapacitated, Elie is forced to dance alone against the contest rules, but earns first place with an emotional performance identical to one Resha gave decades earlier, which also moves Iulius into repenting of his evil. Ribeyla is suddenly beseiged by Demon Card soldiers under the Blue Guardians' command, but they are repelled by Let and Julia, who rejoin Haru's group. After Haru and Musica prevent Mika from killing Iulius, whom she mistakes for calling the attack, the Blue Guardians threaten the villagers into surrendering Elie by sending a giant monster to attack them. While the monster is driven off by a giant snake charmed by Resha and Elie's dances, Branch kidnaps Mika and passes her off as Elie as revenge for deceiving him. However, the Blue Guardians recognize Mika as Nagisa Ansecto, a member of the Resistance that opposes Demon Card, and force Branch to torture her for information. Haru's group rescues Nagisa, with Musica beating Branch and the Blue Guardians members responsible for her injuries.
24	October 17, 2003	978-4-06-363297-2	May 29, 2007	978-1-59532-628-7
192. "Gazing at the Night Sky" (見上げた夜空に, Miageta Yozora ni); 193. "Defiance of the Wild Blossoms" (野に咲く心意気, No ni Saku Kokoroiki); 194. "Home of the Freedom Fighters" (自由戦士の家, Jiyū Senshi no Ie); 195. "Wrapped in BG's Net" (BG(ブルーガーディエンズ)包囲網, Burū Gādienzu Hōimō); 196. "Battle of the Gate" (門(ゲート)の攻防, Gēto no Kōbō); 197. "Victory 'Awakened'!?" ("目覚めた"勝機!?, "Mezameta" Shōki!?); 198. "The Spirit of a Woman!" (女の気合!, Onna no Kiai!); 199. "Secret of the Hideout?!" (アジトの秘密!?, Ajito no Himitsu!?); 200. "Magical Elie" (マジカル・エリー, Majikaru Erī)
Haru's group intercepts a transmission from the Blue Guardians claiming to have found the Resistance's secret hideout. When Nagisa brings the group to the hideout to stop the attack, they discover the report was a bluff made by the enemy to trace their location. Haru's group allies with the Resistance to battle the Blue Guardians' forces, including Six Guard, Hardner's personal bodyguards, who successfully breach the hideout. Let and Ruby secure the front gate by defeating Six Guard's Sean Vivera while the rest of the group faces the other members, with Julia defeating the member Reevil. While Elie battles Six Guard member Koala, who has been ordered to capture her, she falls into an underground cave where she discovers Resha's magical Time-Space Staff, which the Resistance had been protecting from Hardner. The staff gives Elie the ability to channel Etherion into energy bullets, allowing her to defeat Koala. Meanwhile, Haru is attacked by a masked metallic warrior who begs for his help.
25	December 17, 2003	978-4-06-363318-4	September 4, 2007	978-1-59532-629-4
201. "As a Human" (人として, Hito Toshite); 202. "Fugue of the Staff" ("杖"の遁走曲(フーガ), "Tsue" no Fūga); 203. "Devilish Boom" (悪魔の爆音, Akuma no Bakuon); 204. "Vagrant Future" (彷徨う未来, Hōkō u Mirai); 205. "Triangle of Fate?!" (運命のトライアングル!?, Unmei no Toraianguru!?); 206. "Super-Fortress Albatross" (超要塞アルバトロス, Chōyōsai Arubatorosu); 207. "Charge! The Fortress of Malice!" (突入! 悪意の牙城!!, Totsunyū! Akui no Gajō!!); 208. "Labyrinth of the Sky" (迷宮の空, Meikyū no Sora); 209. "Bewildering Memories" (戸惑う記憶...., Tomadou Kioku....)
The metallic warrior is unmasked as Branch, who has been converted by Koala into a cybernetic killing machine. Programmed to destroy the Resistance's hideout in a suicide bombing against his will, Branch redeems himself by warning Haru before self-destructing. Haru's group evacuates with the Resistance while Koala flees with the Blue Gardians, taking the Time-Space Staff with him. While recuperating, Haru's group learns from Nagisa's father, Resistance leader Yuma, that both Etherion and the Time-Space Staff are required to summon Endless, whom Hardner intends to control. Haru later befriends a girl named Belnika in a nearby town, unaware that she is an Etherion user deceived into helping the Blue Guardians. Once prepared, Haru's group raids Hardner's ship, the Albatross, where Hardner declares his plan to destroy the Mystic Realm. Haru's group is joined by Shuda and Iulius, only to be scattered by Koala, who is then murdered by an unknown assailant. Sent by Hardner to fight the intruders, Belnika is shocked to discover Haru is one of them.
26	February 17, 2004	978-4-06-363336-8	December 4, 2007	978-1-59532-630-0
210. "Hardner's Scheme?!" (ハードナーの目論見!?, Hādonā no Mokuromi!?); 211. "Another World" (もう一つの世界, Mō Hitotsu no Sekai); 212. "Belnika's Tears" (ベルニカの涙, Berunika no Namida); 213. "Demonic Trigger" (悪鬼の銃爪(ひきがね), Akki no Hikigane); 214. "Crossroads of the Future" (未来の分岐点, Mirai no Bunkiten); 215. "In Pursuit of Justice" (追いついた正義, Oitsuita Seigi); 216. "Wages of Blasphemy" (冒涜の代償, Bōtoku no Daishō); 217. "'Ambition' Resurrected!" ("野望"再生!, "Yabō" Saisei!)
Belnika learns Haru's identity and questions Hardner's intentions, leading Hardner to hold her comrade Jellybone hostage to force her compliance. Julia goes alone to stop Hardner, but is defeated by the Six Guard member Leopard as the Albatross reaches the Mystic Realm. Leopard then attacks Elie and Nagisa, interrupting their communication with Yuma as they inform him of Hardner's plan, but is defeated by Elie when she learns how to control her magic without the Time-Space Staff. Yuma storms the ship to confront Hardner, who shoots him when Jellybone tries provoking Yuma as a diversion to set Belnika free. Haru confronts Hardner atop the Mystic Realm's floating Altar of Birth, where he plans to fuse with Endless and destroy the world to forget his painful memories. Belnika turns against Hardner, but realizes she does not possess Etherion when she tries to destroy the Time-Space Staff with it, having previously used traces of Elie's Etherion within the staff. Now deciding to use Elie for his plans, Hardner knocks Haru and Belnika off the altar.
27	April 16, 2004	978-4-06-363358-0	March 4, 2008	978-1-59532-631-7
218. "Toward a Futureless World" (未来なき世界へ, Mirainaki Sekai e); 219. "Shield of Bonds" (絆の盾, Kizuna no Tate); 220. "The Things You Believed In" (信じた分だけ, Shinjita Bun Dake); 221. "Born unto This World..." (このセカイに生まれて...., Kono Sekai ni Umarete....); 222. "Souls Beyond Reach" (届かぬ魂, Todoka nu Tamashii); 223. "The Power of Death" (死力, Shiryoku); 224. "Beyond Limitations" (限界の先へ, Genkai no Saki e); 225. "The Sword of Hope" (希望の剣, Kibō no Tsurugi); 226. "Descent of the Demon" (魔界に降りた悪魔, Makai ni Orita Akuma)
Belnika's magic allows her and Haru to survive their fall, but the two are imprisoned by hostile natives of the Mystic Realm. Aboard the Albatross, the remaining members of the Blue Guardians attempt to capture Elie for Hardner to merge with her and acquire Etherion for himself. After Musica defeats Six Guard's Giraffe, Let and Julia send Elie and their other allies to safety while they set out to fight Hardner and Six Guard's leader, Lukan, respectively. Julia defeats Lukan, but suffers major wounds and is brought to Haru by one of her dragon allies as Haru destroys his and Belnika's prison. Meanwhile, Let is defeated by Hardner, whose Sinclaire allows him to regenerate from his wounds. Elie is successfully captured by Hardner's first mate, Lunar, but Haru arrives in time to rescue her from Hardner. As he and Hardner begin their rematch, Endless suddenly appears in the Mystic Realm.
28	June 17, 2004	978-4-06-363387-0	May 13, 2008	978-1-59532-632-4
227. "Accelerated Demise" (加速する終末, Kasoku suru Shūmatsu); 228. "Time to Counterattack" (逆襲の瞬間(とき), Gyakushū no Toki); 229. "Our Wills, Now Bound Together" (つみ重ねてきた意志が今, Tsumi Kasanetekita Ishi ga Ima); 230. "Heart Drop" (心の雫, Kokoro no Shizuku); 231. "Darkness Evolved" (進化する闇, Shinka suru Yami); 232. "A Song of Life" (生命の歌声, Inochi no Utagoe); 233. "Between Days of Battle..." (戦う日々の中で...., Tatakau Hibi no Naka de....); 234. "The Final Rave" (最後のレイヴ, Saigo no Reivu); 235. "Mountain Trail! Haru's Decision!" (岐路! ハルの決断!!, Kiro! Haru no Ketsudan!!)
Haru continues his duel with Hardner, whose Sinclaire loses its effectiveness after his battle with Let, leaving him unable to regenerate from Haru's attacks. Meanwhile, Elie uses Etherion to temporarily banish Endless with Belnika's help, thwarting Hardner's plan. After Hardner is defeated, Yuma confronts him over his attempt to forget the death of his pregnant wife, revealing that his unborn child survived and is actually Nagisa, whom Yuma adopted. Hardner surrenders, grief-stricken over having ordered his daughter's torture, but is attacked by Lucia, the assailant aboard the Albatross, who takes the fourth Sinclaire from him. Lucia destroys the Altar of Birth and leaves Haru to die, but he is rescued by the Mystic Realm's people, who accept him and his human allies for saving their home. Haru's group parts ways with the Resistance, leaving Lazenby and Iulius with them, while Belnika joins Haru as they near the end of their search for the final Rave.
29	August 17, 2004	978-4-06-363412-9	July 7, 2008	978-1-59532-809-0
236. "Voice of the Labyrinth" (迷宮の声, Meikyū no Koe); 237. "About the Second Rave Master" (二代目レイヴ使い(マスター)として, Ni-daime Reivu Masutā Toshite); 238. "The Sword Saint Resurrected" (蘇る剣聖, Yomigaeru Kensei); 239. "Between the Blades" (剣の問い, Tsurugi no Toi); 240. "The Weight of One's Sword" (剣の重み, Ken no Omomi); 241. "For Whose Sake?" (誰がために, Dare ga Tame ni); 242. "Inside of Resha..." (リーシャの中で...., Rīsha no Naka de....); 243. "The Sword Saint's Baton" (剣聖のバトン, Kensei no Baton); 244. "How This World Began" (この"世界"の始まり, Kono "Sekai" no Hajimari)
The group meets Alpine Spaniel, the sole surviving Knight of the Blue Sky, who leads Haru to a trial to obtain the Rave of Truth. There Haru reunites with Shiba, who reveals that the Rave of Truth has deemed Haru unworthy of being the Rave Master, favoring Shiba instead. Shiba challenges Haru to surpass him in a swordfight, taking a potion made by Alice that temporarily restores his youth. Despite his training and experience, Haru is outmatched by Shiba, who questions Haru's reason to fight. Learning that Shiba fought for Resha's sake, Haru decides his reason to fight is to protect Elie, which gives him the strength to win the duel and earn the Rave of Truth's favor. However, Shiba's lifespan is reduced as a side effect of Alice's potion, and he dies in Elie's arms after recognizing her as Resha. After Haru defeats the intruding Berial, Alpine informs Haru's group that they are living a parallel world in which mankind avoided extinction thanks to Star Memory's power over time travel, which also resulted in the creation of Endless, who exists to destroy the parallel world. Meanwhile, Lucia confronts Sieg Hart at Mildian to obtain the final Sinclaire.
30	October 15, 2004	978-4-06-363435-8	September 9, 2008	978-1-59816-192-2
245. "The True Nature of Dark Brings" (ダークブリングの正体, Dāku Buringu no Shōtai); 246. "That Which Supports Us" (支えてくれるもの, Sasaete Kureru Mono); 247. "To Symphonia Once More" (シンフォニア､ 再び...., Shinfonia, Futatabi....); 248. "In The Promised Land" (約束の地で...., Yakusoku no Chi de....); 249. "The Door to Elie...and the Truth" (真実(エリー)への扉!?, Erī e no Tobira!?); 250. "A Rift in Time" ("時"の亀裂, "Toki" no Kiretsu); 251. "Symphonia, 0015" (シンフォニア0015, Shinfonia 0015); 252. "A Changing World" (変わりゆく世界, Kawari Yuku Sekai); 253. "Race to the Future" (未来への疾走, Mirai e no Shissō)
Endless appears before Lucia and merges with the five Sinclaire pieces, returning to its true form as the first Dark Bring. Saga sends Haru's group to restore Elie's memories to make her able to combine the five Rave stones. The group is brought to Resha's grave in Symphonia aboard Sieg Hart and his allies' airship, but Shakuma pursues them there. While the rest of the group distracts Shakuma, Elie uses Etherion to locate the magically hidden grave, creating a space-time distortion that sends her, Haru, Plue, and Sieg Hart fifty-two years in the past, months before Resha's death. Haru causes a time paradox when he thwarts an attempt on Resha's life by assassins from the Raregroove Kingdom, which allows the assassins to escape instead of being captured as they originally were. When the assassins later kidnap Resha, Haru goes to stop them from killing her before she can create Rave.
31	January 17, 2005	978-4-06-363471-6	December 2, 2008	978-1-59816-193-9
254. "Give Resha Back!" (リーシャを返せ!, Rīsha o Kaese!); 255. "'Time' at the Cliff's Edge" (崖っ縁の"時", Gakeppuchi no "Toki"); 256. "The Worst Truth?!" (最悪の真実!?, Saiaku no Shinjitsu!?); 257. "On September 9th, All Began with the Rain" (9月9日､ はじまりの雨, Kugatsu Kokonoka, Hajimari no Ame); 258. "Lives Surpassing Time" (時を超えた命, Toki o Koeta Inochi); 259. "The Guardian Linked to Time" (時を架けた番人(ジーク), Toki o Kaketa Jīku); 260. "Eternal Vow" (永遠の誓い, Eien no Chikai); 261. "Engraved unto Sieg..." (ジークを刻んで...., Jīku o Kizan de....); 262. "The Trigger to Destruction?!" (破滅への引鉄!?, Hametsu e no Hikigane!?)
Haru rescues Resha and corrects the paradox, but Resha unwittingly ends up in possession of Elie's pendant, which is engraved with information from the future. As Haru and Sieg Hart attempt to recover the pendant, they overhear Haru's grandfather, the Symphonian king Malakia, seemingly plotting to kill Resha in contrast to historical reports that Resha died from overusing Etherion. On the appointed day, however, Haru discovers Resha faking her death to hide from the Raregroove Kingdom. Meanwhile, Elie regains her memories and realizes she and Resha are the same person, having sealed herself for fifty years and awoken with amnesia, with Malakia taking the identity of Kaim to watch over her until his death. With the mystery of Elie's identity solved, Sieg Hart sends Haru, Elie, and Plue forward in time through a temporal rift, remaining behind to stabilize the rift. Upon returning to the present, Haru and Elie recognize the skeleton in front of Resha's grave as Sieg Hart's corpse, consigned to remain there with Elie's pendant to avoid further changes to history. Shakuma destroys Sieg Hart's remains and attempts to capture Elie for Lucia, but Elie, now in full control of Etherion, faces him.
32	March 10, 2005	978-4-06-363496-9	February 10, 2009	978-1-59816-194-6
263. "The Power to Unite All" (一つになる"チカラ", Hitotsu ni Naru "Chikara"); 264. "Vow of Souls" (魂の誓い, Tamashii no Chikai); 265. "Demonic Feast" (悪魔の饗宴, Akuma no Kyōen); 266. "The Silverclaimer's Ordeal" (試練の銀術師(シルバークレイマー), Shiren no Shirubākureimā); 267. "That Which Is Lacking..." (足りないもの...., Tarinai Mono....); 268. "The Tenth Holy Blade, a Drop of Life!" (第10の聖剣、命の雫!, Dai-jū no Seiken, Inochi no Shizuku!); 269. "The Mightiest Bonds" (最強の絆, Saikyō no Kizuna); 270. "The Final Light" (最後の光, Saigo no Hikari); 271. "Pure Hearts, Passing Each Other By" (すれ違う純情♡, Surechigau Junjō)
Shakuma is defeated by Haru and Elie after revealing himself to be Lucia's grandfather and the ruler of the Raregroove Kingdom. Upon learning of Shakuma's death, Lucia summons the Four Great Demon Lords to aid him in destroying the parallel world, massacring Demon Card's remaining forces in the process. Meanwhile, Musica learns from his grandfather's notes that the Ten Powers' tenth form does not exist. He returns to Punk Street to consult his grandfather, but finds him and the rest of the town frozen alive by the Demon Lord Jiero. Niebel persuades Musica to forge the new sword himself, which he accomplishes with a drop of silver infused with magic from his and Reina's bond; the power of the sword, dubbed Ravelt, thaws the town and saves its inhabitants. After Elie finishes combining the Raves, Haru's group parties for the night as they prepare to face Lucia the following day.
33	May 16, 2005	978-4-06-363523-2	May 24, 2011	978-0-345-52242-9
272. "Setting Sail for the Future" (未来への船出, Mirai e no Funade); 273. "The Battle Begins" (開戦!!!, Kaisen!!!); 274. "For Today!" (今日の為に!!, Kyō no Tame ni!!); 275. "Gateway to the End" (終末の扉, Shūmatsu no Tobira); 276. "The Shield of Life" (命の盾, Inochi no Tate); 277. "Connecting with the Future..." (未来を繋ぐ為に...., Mirai o Tsunagu Tame ni....); 278. "Transcending Despair" ("絶望"を超えて, "Zetsubō" o Koete); 279. "The Reward for Hope" (希望の代償, Kibō no Daishō); 280. "The Call of Life" (命の咆哮, Inochi no Hōkō)
Haru's group sets out to fight Lucia after Haru and Elie agree to move in together after the battle. With help from their comrades gathered by a letter sent by Sieg Hart from the past, their airship reaches a dimension containing Lucia and the Four Great Demon Lords. However, Asura captures Elie and destroys the airship, separating the group. Julia and Belnika encounter Jiero, whom Belnika fails to defeat with a suicide attack due to Jiero's regenerative powers. Niebel casts a spell that accelerates his aging to increase his power and immobilize Jiero while her power is nullified by the mortally wounded Belnika, allowing Julia to destroy Jiero from the inside. Meanwhile, Demon Lord Uta attempts to stop Haru from chasing after Elie, but is impeded by Musica and Let. Let sends Musica after Haru and faces Uta alone, but is unable to defeat him with his ultimate Dragon Race technique.
34	July 15, 2005	978-4-06-363549-2	May 24, 2011	978-0-345-52242-9
281. "Transcending Eternity" (永遠をこえるモノ, Eien o Koeru Mono); 282. "I Won't Let a Single Person Die!" (誰も死なせない!, Dare mo Shinasenai!); 283. "A Blow Against the World!" (世界の一撃!, Sekai no Ichigeki!); 284. "The Path of Destruction" (滅亡の足音, Metsubō no Ashioto); 285. "The Other Side of Promises" (約束の向こう側へ, Yakusoku no Mukō Gawa e); 286. "For the Sake of Life!" (生きてこそ...., Ikite Koso....); 287. "Elie Is Waiting!" (エリーが待ってる!, Erī ga Matteru!); 288. "A Mother's Wish" (母なる意志, Haha naru Ishi); 289. "I Won't Let It End Yet!" (まだ終わらせない!, Mada Owarasenai!)
Let sacrifices his humanity to transform into a dragon and defeat Uta, revealing himself as the king of the Dragon Race, Java Let Dahaka. Haru defeats Asura, from whom he learns Lucia's objective is to repopulate humanity with Elie in the original world. Lucia and Megido ambush Haru, with the former taking Elie to the dimension's deepest area while the latter gravely wounds Haru. Shuda rescues Haru and defeats Megido, surviving the Demon Lord's final attempt on his life and fulfilling his promise to Gale to protect his son, but is too injured to continue further, leaving Musica to help Haru recover. Lucia initiates Endless' Overdrive while he prepares to travel to the original world with Elie. However, Endless speaks to Lucia, urging him to kill Elie to prevent her from stopping the Overdrive. Lucia reluctantly complies, but before he can do so, Haru faces him in a final confrontation.
35	September 9, 2005	978-4-06-363569-0	May 24, 2011	978-0-345-52242-9
290. "Human Strength" (人間の力, Ningen no Chikara); 291. "The Holy Star" (星の聖地, Hoshi no Seichi); 292. "A False World?" (間違った世界!?, Machigatta Sekai!?); 293. "The Final Flicker" (最後の一閃, Saigo no Issen); 294. "A Decision for the Future" (未来への決断, Mirai e no Ketsudan); 295. "Their Answer" (ふたりの答え, Futari no Kotae); Final Chapter. "The Never Ending Journey" (終わらない旅, Owaranai Tabi)
Musica delivers the Time-Space Staff to Elie, who uses it to return Endless to its original form, but Lucia drags himself and Haru into Endless' body, leaving Elie unable to use Etherion against it. Lucia reveals that he and Haru's group have been battling inside Star Memory, which Endless has absorbed as it nearly completes the Overdrive. Haru defeats Lucia, who disintegrates alongside Star Memory. Unable to escape, Haru convinces Elie to unleash Etherion, destroying Endless and all Dark Brings along with it, but seemingly killing Haru. Elie suffers from amnesia again, and her friends decide not to tell her about Haru to avoid reminding her of her responsibility for his death. One year later, Haru's group visits his grave at the former site of Star Memory. There Haru suddenly reappears alongside Star Memory, which is revealed to have saved the lives of him and his friends who perished in the final battle. Elie's memories return when Haru greets her, and the two eventually marry on Garage Island.
