= List of Psycho-Pass episodes =

Psycho-Pass is a Japanese anime television series produced by Production I.G, directed by Naoyoshi Shiotani, and written by Gen Urobuchi. The series aired from October 12, 2012, to March 22, 2013, on Fuji TV's Noitamina. Funimation has licensed the series in North America and simulcasted the series on their website.

On July 6, 2013, Production I.G. president Mitsuhisa Ishikawa said at Anime Expo that production on a second season had begun. Titled Psycho-Pass 2, the season was produced by Tatsunoko Production and directed by Kiyotaka Suzuki. It aired from October 10 to December 19, 2014.

On March 8, 2019, a third season was announced. The third season aired on Fuji TV's Noitamina programming block between October 24 and December 12, 2019, with a special program being aired on October 17, 2019. Amazon streamed the series inside and outside of Japan on their Amazon Prime Video service. Naoyoshi Shiotani returned as director, Akira Amano as character designer, and Production I.G. as animation producer. It consisted of eight episodes with each episode being 45 minutes long.

== Series overview ==
Season	Episodes	Originally aired	
Season	Episodes	First aired	Last aired
1	22	October 12, 2012	March 22, 2013
2	11	October 10, 2014	December 19, 2014
3	8	October 24, 2019	December 12, 2019

== Episodes ==
=== Season 1 (2012–13) ===
No. overall	No. in season	Title	Directed by	Original release date
1	1	"Crime Coefficient"; Transliteration: "Hanzai Keisū" (Japanese: 犯罪係数)	Naoko Kusumi	October 12, 2012
2	2	"Those Capable"; Transliteration: "Nashi Uru Mono" (Japanese: 成しうる者)	Takayuki Hamana	October 19, 2012
3	3	"Rearing Conventions"; Transliteration: "Shiiku no Sahō" (Japanese: 飼育の作法)	Toshiyuki Kono	October 26, 2012
4	4	"Nobody Knows Your Mask"; Transliteration: "Dare mo Shiranai Anata no Kamen" (Japanese: 誰も知らないあなたの仮面)	Itsuro Kawasaki	November 2, 2012
5	5	"Nobody Knows Your Face"; Transliteration: "Dare mo Shiranai Anata no Kao" (Japanese: 誰も知らないあなたの顔)	Kaoru Suzuki	November 9, 2012
6	6	"Return of the Psychotic Prince"; Transliteration: "Kyōōji no Kikan" (Japanese: 狂王子の帰還)	Yasuo Ejima	November 16, 2012
7	7	"Symbolism of Bletilla Striata"; Transliteration: "Shiran no Hanakotoba" (Japanese: 紫蘭の花言葉)	Yukio Nishimoto	November 23, 2012
8	8	"The Rest Is Silence"; Transliteration: "Ato wa, Chinmoku" (Japanese: あとは、沈黙)	Takayuki Hamana	November 30, 2012
9	9	"Paradise Fruit"; Transliteration: "Rakuen no Kajitsu" (Japanese: 楽園の果実)	Kyōhei Ishiguro	December 7, 2012
10	10	"Methuselah's Game"; Transliteration: "Metosura no Yūgi" (Japanese: メトスラの遊戯)	Kazuo Sakai	December 14, 2012
11	11	"Saint's Supper"; Transliteration: "Seija no Bansan" (Japanese: 聖者の晩餐)	Hirotaka Endo	December 21, 2012
12	12	"Devil's Crossroad"	Itsuro Kawasaki	January 10, 2013
13	13	"Invitation from the Abyss"; Transliteration: "Shin'en kara no Shōtai" (Japanese: 深淵からの招待)	Yasuo Ejima	January 17, 2013
14	14	"Sweet Poison"; Transliteration: "Amai Doku" (Japanese: 甘い毒)	Shunichi Yoshizawa	January 24, 2013
15	15	"The Town Where Sulfur Falls"; Transliteration: "Iō Furu Machi" (Japanese: 硫黄降る街)	Yoji Sato	January 31, 2013
16	16	"The Gate to Judgment"; Transliteration: "Sabaki no Mon" (Japanese: 裁きの門)	Yutaka Hirata	February 7, 2013
17	17	"Iron Heart"; Transliteration: "Tetsu no Harawata" (Japanese: 鉄の腸)	Noriyuki Nomata	February 14, 2013
18	18	"A Promise Written on Water"; Transliteration: "Mizu ni Kaita Yakusoku" (Japanese: 水に書いた約束)	Shinpei Nagai	February 21, 2013
19	19	"Transparent Shadow"; Transliteration: "Tōmei na Kage" (Japanese: 透明な影)	Yasuo Ejima	February 28, 2013
20	20	"Where Justice Lies"; Transliteration: "Seigi no Arika" (Japanese: 正義の在処)	Itsuro Kawasaki	March 7, 2013
21	21	"Blood-Stained Reward"; Transliteration: "Chi no Hōshō" (Japanese: 血の褒賞)	Yoji Sato	March 14, 2013
22	22	"Perfect World"; Transliteration: "Kanpeki na Sekai" (Japanese: 完璧な世界)	Naoyoshi Shiotani, Itsuro Kawasaki	March 22, 2013

=== Season 2 (2014) ===
No. overall	No. in season	Title	Original release date
23	1	"The Scales of Justice <299/300>"; Transliteration: "Seigi no Tenbin <299/300>" (Japanese: 正義の天秤〈299/300〉)	October 10, 2014
24	2	"The Creeping Unknown"; Transliteration: "Shinobiyoru Kyojitsu" (Japanese: 忍び寄る虚実)	October 17, 2014
25	3	"The Devil's Proof"; Transliteration: "Akuma no Shōmei" (Japanese: 悪魔の証明)	October 24, 2014
26	4	"The Salvation of Job"; Transliteration: "Yobu no Kyūsai" (Japanese: ヨブの救済)	October 31, 2014
27	5	"Unforbidden Games"; Transliteration: "Kinjirarenai Asobi" (Japanese: 禁じられない遊び)	November 7, 2014
28	6	"Those Who Cast Stones"; Transliteration: "Ishi o Nageutsu Hitobito" (Japanese: 石を擲つ人々)	November 14, 2014
29	7	"Untraceable Children"; Transliteration: "Mitsukaranai Kodomo-tachi" (Japanese: 見つからない子供たち)	November 21, 2014
30	8	"Conception of the Oracle <AA>"; Transliteration: "Miko no Kaitai <AA>" (Japanese: 巫女の懐胎<AA>)	November 28, 2014
31	9	"The Omnipotence Paradox"; Transliteration: "Zen'nō-sha no Paradokusu" (Japanese: 全能者のパラドクス)	December 5, 2014
32	10	"Gauging the Soul"; Transliteration: "Tamashī no Kijun" (Japanese: 魂の基準)	December 12, 2014
33	11	"What Color?"	December 19, 2014

=== Season 3 (2019) ===
No. overall	No. in season	Title	Original release date
34	1	"Laelaps' Calling"; Transliteration: "Rairapusu no shōmei" (Japanese: ライラプスの召命)	October 24, 2019
35	2	"Teumessian Sacrifices"; Transliteration: "Teumesosu no ikenie" (Japanese: テウメソスの生贄)	October 31, 2019
36	3	"Herakles and the Sirens"; Transliteration: "Herakuresu to seirēn" (Japanese: ヘラクレスとセイレーン)	November 7, 2019
37	4	"Political Strife in the Colosseum"; Transliteration: "Korosseo no seisō" (Japanese: コロッセオの政争)	November 14, 2019
38	5	"Agamemnon's Offering"; Transliteration: "Agamemunon no hansai" (Japanese: アガメムノンの燔祭)	November 21, 2019
39	6	"Caesar's Gold Coins"; Transliteration: "Kaesaru no kinka" (Japanese: カエサルの金貨)	November 28, 2019
40	7	"Don't take God's name in vain"	December 5, 2019
41	8	"Cubism"	December 12, 2019
