= Sergey Bashkirov =

Russian painter

- Born: Sergey Bashkirov; December 17, 1971; Siberia, Russia
- Known for: Painter

Sergey Gennadievich Bashkirov (born December 17, 1971, in Siberia), known as Sergey Bashkirov, is a contemporary Russian painter.

== Early life and education ==
Bashkirov was born in Siberia on December 17, 1971. He graduated from two different universities in St. Petersburg. One of them - the Sport Academy named after Lesgaft (major- hockey trainer) and the other one - the East European Institute of psychoanalysis (major- psychological correction and positive psychology). He furthered his career in Northern India. For 12 years, Bashkirov was living and studying at the university of Human Ecology in Northern India (major - Yoga Trainer and Art Therapist). Currently he lives and works in St-Petersburg. He has his own studio in the heart of the city.

== Works ==
In 2006, being impressed by the exhibition of Filonov, he first tried painting. Today, after several years of experiments and studies of various schools of painting, Bashkirov is concentrated on abstract and colorful vision, using different techniques. He uses hardened brushes, spatula, and even his hands as paint applicators. Bashkirov's technique of pouring, sprinkling paint gives the impression of spontaneity. In his paintings a wide gamma of colours is used and still they are harmonic for the viewer.

== Exhibitions ==
- 2011, 8–22 January, St.Petersburg, Annual exhibition for artists from St.Petersburg
- 2010, 1–5 December, Moscow, Art Manezh(Арт Манеж)
- 2010, St.Petersburg, Restaurant "Volna"
- 2010, St.Petersburg, Gallery "Zerkalo"
- 2010, St.Petersburg, private exhibition "Unbearable easiness of beings"
- 2010, St.Petersburg, private exhibition "Iron heart"
