= Captain Marvel (Marvel Comics) =

Comic book superhero

- Mar-Vell and Carol Danvers; Textless cover of Generations: Captain Marvel & Captain Mar-Vell #1 (November 2017). Art by David Nakayama.
- Publisher: Marvel Comics
- First appearance: Marvel Super-Heroes #12 (December 1967)
- Created by: Stan Lee (writer); Gene Colan (art)
- Characters: Mar-Vell; Monica Rambeau; Genis-Vell; Phyla-Vell; Khn'nr; Noh-Varr; Carol Danvers

Captain Marvel
- : Mar-Vell on the cover of Captain Marvel #1 (May 1968). Art by Gene Colan.

Series publication information
- Publisher: Marvel Comics
- Schedule: List: (vol 1) Monthly (1–19) and Bi-monthly (20–62) (vol 3–10) Monthly
- Format: List: (vol 1, 3–5, 7–10) Ongoing series (vol 6) Limited series (vol 2) One-shot issues published in 1989 and 1994
- Publication date: List: (vol 1) May 1968 – May 1979 (vol 2) 1989 and 1994 (one-shots) (vol 3) December 1995 – May 1996 (vol 4) November 1999 – October 2002 (vol 5) November 2002 – September 2004 (vol 6) January – June 2008 (vol 7) September 2012 – November 2013 and December 2017 – April 2018 (vol 8) May 2014 – July 2015 (vol. 9) March 2016 – January 2017 (vol 10) March 2019 – August 2023
- Number of issues: List: (vol 1): 62 (vol 2): 2 (vol 3): 6 (vol 4): 36 (vol 5): 25 (vol 6): 5 (vol 7): 22 (vol 8): 15 (vol 9): 10 (vol 10): 50
- Main character(s): List: (vol 1) Mar-Vell (vol 2) (one-shots) Monica Rambeau (vol 3–5) Genis-Vell (vol 6) Khn'nr (vol 7–10) Carol Danvers

Creative team
- Writer(s): List: (vol 1) Arnold Drake Gary Friedrich Roy Thomas Marv Wolfman Mike Friedrich Jim Starlin Steve Englehart Gerry Conway Scott Edelman (vol 2) Dwayne McDuffie Dwight Coye (vol 3) Fabian Nicieza (vol 4–5) Peter David (vol 6) Brian Reed (vol 7–8) Kelly Sue DeConnick Margaret Stohl (vol 9) Michele Fazekas Christos Gage Ruth Gage (vol 10) Kelly Thompson
- Penciller(s): List: (vol 1) Don Heck Dick Ayers Frank Springer Gil Kane Wayne Boring Jim Starlin Al Milgrom Pat Broderick (vol 2) Mark Bright (vol 3) Ed Benes (vol 4–5) ChrisCross (vol 6) Lee Weeks (vol 7) Dexter Soy Filipe Andrade Scott Hepburn Patrick Olliffe Ramon Rosanas Michele Bandini (vol 8) David Lopez (vol 9) Kris Anka (vol 10) Carmen Carnero
- Inker(s): List: (vol 1) Vince Colletta Dan Adkins Al Milgrom Terry Austin (vol 2) Stan Drake Frank Bolle Dennis Jensen Barbara Kaalberg Mark McKenna (vol 3) Mike Sellers (vol 4) Anibal Rodriguez (vol 5) Aaron Lopresti (vol 6) Stefano Gaudiano Jesse Delperdang (vol 7) Dexter Soy Filipe Andrade Ramon Rosanas Michele Bandini (vol 8) David Lopez (vol 9) Kris Anka (vol 10) Carmen Carnero

Captain Marvel is the name of several superheroes appearing in American comic books published by Marvel Comics. Most of these versions exist in Marvel's main shared universe, known as the Marvel Universe. The original Captain Marvel is Mar-Vell and the current incarnation of the character is Carol Danvers.

In the Marvel Cinematic Universe, Carol Danvers is Captain Marvel, portrayed by McKenna Grace and Brie Larson in Captain Marvel and Avengers: Endgame (both 2019), Shang-Chi and the Legend of the Ten Rings (2021), Disney+ television series Ms. Marvel (2022), and the movie The Marvels (2023).

== Publication history ==
Following a trial in which DC Comics sued Fawcett Comics for breach of copyright, claiming Fawcett's Captain Marvel was too similar to Superman, the latter stopped publishing Captain Marvel in 1953. In the late 1960s Marvel gained the trademark "Captain Marvel" with its first series.

In order to retain its trademark, Marvel has published a Captain Marvel title periodically every few years since, leading to a number of ongoing series, limited series, and one-shots featuring a range of characters using the Captain Marvel alias.

=== Mar-Vell ===
The first Captain Marvel is Mar-Vell. Created by Stan Lee and artist Gene Colan, the character first appeared in Marvel Super-Heroes #12 (December 1967).

Captain Mar-Vell is a military officer of the Kree Imperial Militia sent to observe the planet Earth, as it is developing technology to travel into space. Mar-Vell eventually wearies of his superiors' malicious intent and allies himself with Earth, and the Kree Empire brands him a traitor. From then on, Mar-Vell fights to protect Earth from all threats.

He was later revamped by Roy Thomas and Gil Kane. Having been exiled to the Negative Zone by the Supreme Intelligence, the only way Mar-Vell can temporarily escape is to exchange atoms with Rick Jones by means of special wristbands called Nega-Bands. He is also given superpowers, and his Kree military uniform is replaced with a form-fitting costume. The process of the young man being replaced in a flash by the older superhero was a nod to the original Fawcett Captain Marvel, which had young Billy Batson say the magic word "Shazam" to transform into the hero.

With the title's sales still flagging, Marvel allowed Jim Starlin to conceptually revamp the character, although his appearance was little changed. Mar-Vell is freed from the Negative Zone and becomes a cosmic champion, the "Protector of the Universe" appointed by the cosmic entity Eon. Together, Mar-Vell and Rick continue to battle against evil, most notably battling the Death-worshipping Thanos. Mar-Vell became a close ally of the Titans, and one of their number, Elysius, became his lover.

Mar-Vell later develops inoperable cancer, the result of earlier exposure to nerve gas during a battle with Nitro. He died from cancer in the 1982 graphic novel The Death of Captain Marvel and has remained dead since.

=== Monica Rambeau ===
The second Captain Marvel is Monica Rambeau. Created by Roger Stern and John Romita Jr., the character first appeared in The Amazing Spider-Man Annual #16 (October 1982).

Monica Rambeau is a police lieutenant from New Orleans, Louisiana who can transform into any form of energy. Her powers were briefly altered so that she cannot transform to energy, but instead can generate a personal force field. Sometime later, the Stranger returned her energy-transformation abilities. She is a member of the Avengers, and at one point she served as their leader. She eventually ceded the Captain Marvel name to the original Captain Marvel's son after which Rambeau took the name Photon, using that name for quite some time until Genis-Vell adopted the same name. Genis-Vell and Monica discussed this, and Monica decided on the name Pulsar.

Rambeau later joined H.A.T.E. (the Highest Anti-Terrorism Effort) in the new series titled Nextwave. In this series created by Warren Ellis and Stuart Immonen, H.A.T.E. (a subsidiary of the Beyond Corporation) forms a team to fight the Bizarre Weapons of Mass Destruction. Members include Monica Rambeau, a man known only as The Captain, Boom Boom, Aaron Stack, and Elsa Bloodstone. She returned to the Avengers using the codename Spectrum.

=== Genis-Vell ===
The third Captain Marvel is Genis-Vell. Created by Ron Marz and Ron Lim, the character first appeared in Silver Surfer vol. 3 Annual #6 (1993).

Genis-Vell is the genetically engineered son of Mar-Vell and his lover Elysius, created from the late Mar-Vell's cell samples and artificially aged to physical, if not emotional, maturity. Genis, like his father, wears the Nega-Bands, possesses cosmic awareness, and is, for a time, bonded with Rick Jones. Although the pair do not get along at first, they eventually become good friends. Genis goes insane and threatens to destroy the universe.

After dying and resurrecting himself with the secret aid of Helmut Zemo, Genis-Vell joins the Thunderbolts under the name Photon. However, in accelerating his resurrection, Zemo links Genis to the ends of time, causing a degenerative effect on the universe. To prevent the inevitable destruction of all existence, Zemo scatters pieces of Genis-Vell's body through time and the Darkforce. Long after his death, Genis is resurrected by Carol Danvers and Phyla-Vell.

=== Phyla-Vell ===
The fourth Captain Marvel is Phyla-Vell. Created by Peter David and Paul Azaceta, the character first appeared in Captain Marvel vol. 5 #16 (November 2003).

Phyla-Vell is the sister of Genis-Vell. She is created when Genis, an only child, recreates the universe and, in doing so, creates various anomalies which result in his mother being restored to life and his sister coming into existence. She is last seen romancing Moondragon.

Phyla-Vell appears in the Annihilation event, fighting alongside Nova's United Front in an effort to stop the destructive armies of Annihilus. She becomes the new Quasar after the original, Wendell Vaughn, is killed by Annihilus.

Phyla has superhuman strength. She can fire energy blasts, fly, and act like an "energy sponge", absorbing any energy attacks directed at her and returning them as energy blasts. Phyla also has cosmic awareness and is a proficient fighter.

Phyla later becomes an avatar for Oblivion and renames herself Martyr. She is later killed rescuing the Guardians of the Galaxy, and has remained dead since.

=== Khn'nr ===
The fifth Captain Marvel is Khn'nr. Created by Paul Jenkins and Tom Raney, the character first appeared in Civil War: The Return (January 2007).

He is a Skrull sleeper agent who is bound with Mar-Vell's DNA to lock itself into Mar-Vell's form and given technological replicas of the Kree Nega-Bands. However, his mental conditioning was botched, causing Khn'nr's personality to be erased, leaving the Mar-Vell persona dominant. Though part of the Secret Invasion, Khn'nr decides to fight against the invading Skrulls, during which he is nearly killed.

=== Noh-Varr ===
The sixth Captain Marvel is Noh-Varr. Created by Grant Morrison and J.G. Jones, the character first appeared in Marvel Boy #1 (August 2000).

As part of the Dark Reign storyline, Noh-Varr joined the new team the Dark Avengers, using the alias Captain Marvel. He subsequently quit the team upon discovering they were all villains, at which point he was contacted by the Supreme Intelligence, given a copy of the original Captain Marvel's Nega Bands, and told he should take his place as the Kree's protector of Earth. This led to Noh-Varr taking the new code name Protector. Noh-Varr currently goes by the codename Marvel Boy, the name he uses when he joins the Young Avengers and works alongside the Inhuman Royal Family.

=== Carol Danvers ===
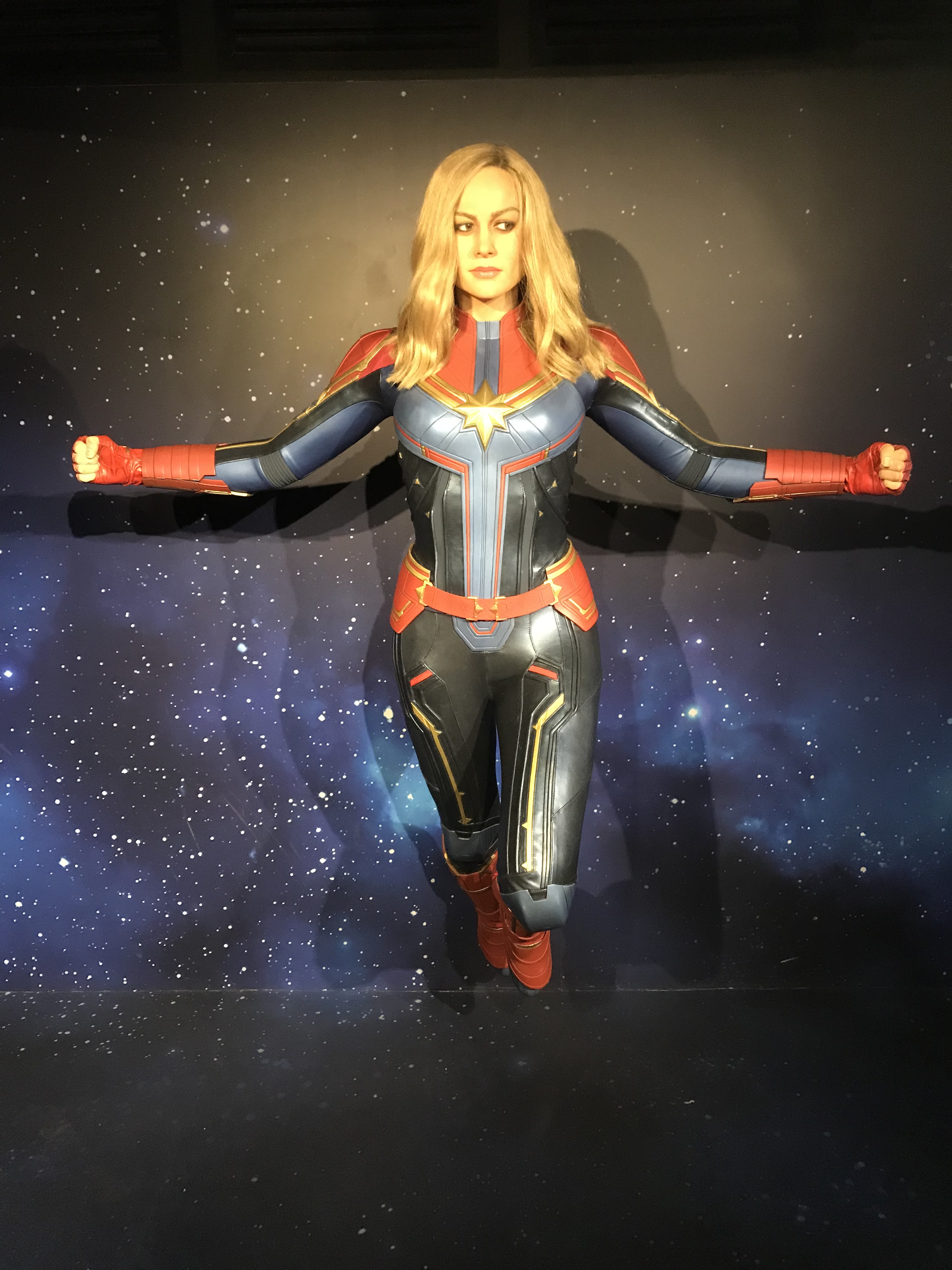
Captain Marvel at Madame Tussauds London

The seventh Captain Marvel is Carol Danvers. Created by Roy Thomas and Gene Colan, the character first appeared in Marvel Super-Heroes #13 (March 1968).

Carol Danvers, the longtime super-heroine known as Ms. Marvel, assumed the mantle of Captain Marvel in an ongoing series written by Kelly Sue DeConnick with art by Dexter Soy, in July 2012. Danvers dons a jumpsuit and explores her own past. DeConnick said at WonderCon 2012 that her pitch for the series could be described as "Carol Danvers as Chuck Yeager." She said the series would contemplate what Captain Marvel's legend means to Danvers, how she will wield it, and how the rest of the Marvel Universe reacts.

== Other versions ==
=== Age of Ultron ===
In the Age of Ultron crossover event, Janet van Dyne becomes Captain Marvel in an alternate timeline created by the death of Hank Pym. Pym is murdered by a time-travelling Wolverine to prevent the creation of Ultron, who will kill most of Earth's population in the future.

=== Amalgam Comics ===
In two issues of JLX and JLX: Unleashed, Captain Marvel combines with Captain Marvel to become yet another Captain Marvel, sporting the DC Comics lightning bolt uniform design but with the original green and white colors of the Marvel version.

=== Cancerverse ===
In The Thanos Imperative, the main villain is an alternate version of Captain Marvel called Lord Mar-Vell. Unlike his Earth-616 counterpart, this Mar-Vell colluded with the Many-angled ones to survive his cancer by destroying Death.

=== Fantastic Four: The End ===
In the limited series Fantastic Four: The End, the superheroine formerly known as Kismet (now under the name of Ayesha) becomes Captain Marvel in the near future.

=== House of M ===
In the alternate, mutant-dominated world created by Scarlet Witch, Carol Danvers (Ms. Marvel in mainstream continuity) uses the name Captain Marvel and is one of the few non-mutant heroes with a successful career.

=== Marvel 2099 ===
In the unified Marvel 2099 reality of Earth-2099, Rowena Stern is the Captain Marvel of this time period. Sometime after her parents were killed by Radioactive Man of the Masters of Evil, Captain Marvel joined the New Avengers.

=== Marvel Zombies ===
An alternate universe version of Mar-Vell / Captain Marvel appears in Marvel Zombies, where he is killed by the Silver Surfer.

=== Ruins ===
In the miniseries Ruins (1995), Mar-Vell is one of the many Kree prisoners held in a reservation in Nevada. The reservation was placed deliberately on top of a former nuclear test site. As a result, the majority of the Kree were inflicted with cancer, including Mar-Vell. Mar-Vell gives an interview to Daily Bugle reporter Phil Sheldon regarding the failed Kree invasion of Earth. Mar-Vell recounts how his ship was made vulnerable to a nuclear strike when their cloaking and shielding was affected by cosmic radiation from the corpse of Silver Surfer.

=== Ultimate Marvel ===
The Ultimate Marvel miniseries Ultimate Secret introduces Mahr Vehl, a renegade Kree who has been surgically altered to look human and sent to Earth by his people to observe its destruction by the entity Gah Lak Tus, but defects to help the humans. He wears a specially designed combat suit that is activated by his wristwatch. The Kree technology in the suit gives Mahr Vehl increased strength and allows him to fly, create energy shields, turn invisible, view different fields of the light spectrum, and fire energy blasts through the "totalkannon" located on his lower arm.

=== Ultimate Universe ===
An original, unnamed incarnation of Captain Marvel appears in the "Ultimate Universe" imprint as a member of the Guardians of the Galaxy.

== In other media ==
=== Television ===
- Mar-Vell / Captain Marvel appears in The Super Hero Squad Show, voiced by Ty Burrell.
- Mar-Vell / Captain Marvel appears in The Avengers: Earth's Mightiest Heroes, voiced by Roger Craig Smith.
- Carol Danvers / Captain Marvel appears in Avengers Assemble, voiced by Grey DeLisle.
- Carol Danvers / Captain Marvel appears in Guardians of the Galaxy, voiced again by Grey DeLisle.
- Carol Danvers / Captain Marvel appears in Spider-Man, voiced again by Grey DeLisle. This version is a member of the Avengers.
- Carol Danvers / Captain Marvel appears in Marvel Rising: Heart of Iron, voiced by Kim Raver.
- Carol Danvers / Captain Marvel appears in Marvel Future Avengers, voiced by Eriko Hirata in Japanese and Erica Lindbeck in English.
- Carol Danvers / Captain Marvel appears in LEGO Marvel Avengers: Climate Conundrum, voiced by Rebecca Shoichet.

=== Film ===
- Carol Danvers / Captain Marvel appears in Marvel Super Hero Adventures: Frost Fight!, voiced again by Grey DeLisle.
- Carol Danvers / Captain Marvel appears in Avengers Confidential: Black Widow & Punisher.
- Carol Danvers / Captain Marvel appears in Marvel Rising: Secret Warriors, voiced again by Kim Raver.

=== Marvel Cinematic Universe ===
- Brie Larson portrays Carol Danvers / Captain Marvel in media set in the Marvel Cinematic Universe (MCU). She first appears in Captain Marvel (2019). She subsequently appears in the live-action films Avengers: Endgame (2019), and Shang-Chi and the Legend of the Ten Rings (2021), along with the live-action series Ms. Marvel. Larson reprised her role in the live-action film The Marvels (2023). Additionally, alternate timeline versions of Danvers appear in the Disney+ animated series What If...? (2021), voiced by Alexandra Daniels.
- Lashana Lynch portrays an alternate version of Maria Rambeau as Captain Marvel in Doctor Strange in the Multiverse of Madness (2022). This version is a member of the Illuminati.

=== Video Games ===
- Genis-Vell / Captain Marvel appears in Marvel: Ultimate Alliance, voiced by Roger Rose.
- Mar-Vell / Captain Marvel appears as a playable character in Marvel Super Hero Squad Online.
- The Mar-Vell and Carol Danvers incarnations of Captain Marvel appear as playable characters in Marvel Heroes, respectively voiced by Josh Keaton and Danielle Nicolet.
- Carol Danvers / Captain Marvel appears in Disney Infinity 2.0., voiced by Jennifer Hale.
- Carol Danvers / Captain Marvel appears as a playable character in Lego Marvel Super Heroes 2, voiced by Kate O'Sullivan.
- Carol Danvers / Captain Marvel appears as a playable character in Marvel Avengers Alliance Tactics.
- Carol Danvers / Captain Marvel, appear as a playable character in Marvel Contest of Champions.
- Carol Danvers / Captain Marvel appears as a playable character in Marvel: Future Fight.
- Carol Danvers / Captain Marvel appears as a playable character in Marvel Avengers Academy, voiced by Hannah Laurel.
- Carol Danvers / Captain Marvel appears as a playable character in Marvel Strike Force.
- Carol Danvers / Captain Marvel appears as a playable character in Marvel vs. Capcom: Infinite, voiced again by Grey DeLisle.
- Carol Danvers / Captain Marvel appears in Marvel Puzzle Quest.
- Carol Danvers / Captain Marvel appears as a playable character in Marvel Powers United VR, voiced by Laura Bailey.
- Carol Danvers / Captain Marvel appears in Marvel Battle Lines.
- Carol Danvers / Captain Marvel appears as a playable character in Marvel Super War.
- Carol Danvers / Captain Marvel appears in Marvel Duel.
- Carol Danvers / Captain Marvel appears as a purchasable skin in Fortnite Battle Royale.
- Carol Danvers / Captain Marvel appears as a playable character in Marvel Ultimate Alliance 3: The Black Order, voiced by Erica Lindbeck.
- Carol Danvers / Captain Marvel appears as a playable character in Marvel Future Revolution, voiced again by Erica Lindbeck.
- Carol Danvers / Captain Marvel appears in Marvel Snap.
- Carol Danvers / Captain Marvel appears as a playable character in Marvel's Midnight Suns, voiced again by Erica Lindbeck.

=== Merchandise ===
- In 2019, Iron Studios released a Carol Danvers / Captain Marvel figurine inspired by the Marvel Cinematic Universe (MCU) incarnation of the character.
- In 2023, Hasbro released a Carol Danvers / Captain Marvel action figure inspired by the Marvel Cinematic Universe (MCU) incarnation of the character, as part of the Marvel Legends action figure line.

=== Theme parks ===
- Carol Danvers / Captain Marvel appears in the theme park attraction Avengers: Quantum Encounter on the Disney Wish cruise ship, with Brie Larson reprising her role as the character.
- Carol Danvers / Captain Marvel appears in the theme park attraction Avengers Assemble: Flight Force in Disneyland Paris, with Brie Larson reprising her role as the character.

=== Miscellaneous ===
- Carol Danvers / Captain Marvel appears in the Marvel Universe: LIVE! stage show.
- Carol Danvers / Captain Marvel appears in the War of the Realms: Marvel Ultimate Comics motion comics, voiced by Jewel Staite.
