= Uranian (comics) =

Fictional race in the Marvel Universe

Uranians

Publication information
- Publisher: Marvel Comics
- First appearance: Marvel Boy #1 (November 1950)
- Created by: Russ Heath (artist); Stan Lee (writer)

Characteristics
- Place of origin: Uranus
- Notable members: Astron; Sui-San; Uranos

The Uranians are a fictional race appearing in American comic books published by Marvel Comics. They first appeared in Marvel Boy #1 (1950) as the human-like inhabitants of the planet Uranus who became the hosts and mentors of Marvel Boy (Robert Grayson) and provided him with the technology which led to him becoming a superhero.

Uranians were originally described as a utopian society of extraterrestrials native to Uranus who had found scientific cures for aging, disease, crime, and other adversities. They were later retconned as a colony of the Eternals, an offshoot of humanity that possessed near-immortality, super-powers and vastly advanced technology even before the founding their colony on Uranus.

The backstory of Uranos and other Uranian Eternals (such as Sui-San, mother of Thanos) was featured in Captain Marvel #29 (November 1973, by Jim Starlin).

== Fictional history ==
Centuries ago, a civil war among Earth's Eternals ended with the losing side, led by Uranos, being banished from Earth. At this point, the Eternals had not yet gained their superpowers of longevity and near-invulnerability, so Uranos and his followers were never described to possess these qualities. Uranos and his Eternals arrived at the seventh planet from the sun, which became known as Uranus as a result. There they discovered a Kree base, established during the Kree-Skrull War. Using Kree technology, the warlike Uranos and most of his followers built a spaceship with the intention to return and conquer Earth and destroy the other Eternals. Astron and three other, more peaceful of Uranos' Eternals chose to remain on Uranus. Uranos and his faction encountered a Kree armada, which destroyed their spaceship. The surviving members of the faction settled on Titan, a moon of Saturn. Their civilization there eventually destroyed itself through civil war. The sole survivor, Sui-San, together with A'lars, an Eternal from Earth, became the parents of the Eternals of Titan.

The peaceful Eternals back on Uranus were the ancestors of the Uranians, who flourished on Uranus until the mid-20th century when they were wiped out by natural disasters. They have also been portrayed as having been killed, at their own request, by Deathurge.
