= Starfox (character) =

Marvel Comics fictional character

Eros Starfox
- Starfox as depicted in A.X.E.: Starfox #1 (October 2022). Art by Kevin Wada.

Publication information
- Publisher: Marvel Comics
- First appearance: The Invincible Iron Man #55) (February 1973)
- Created by: Jim Starlin (writer and artist)

In-story information
- Alter ego: Eros of Titan (originally Eron)
- Species: Titanian
- Place of origin: Titan
- Team affiliations: Dark Guardians; Avengers; Eternals
- Notable aliases: The Knave of Hearts; Prime Eternal; Starfox
- Abilities: Superhuman strength, agility, durability, and longevity; Psychic control over the emotions of others; Flight

Eros is a character appearing in American comic books published by Marvel Comics. Created by writer and artist Jim Starlin, the character first appeared in The Invincible Iron Man #55 (February 1973). Eros is depicted as a member of the Eternals, a human offshoot race. Born on Titan, he is the son of A'lars / Mentor. He faces opposition from his mad brother, the supervillain Thanos.

Eros is known by the codename Starfox and the Knave of Hearts. His primary power is the ability to stimulate the pleasure centers of people's brains, allowing him to control their emotions and actions. He has also served as a member of both the Avengers and the Dark Guardians at various points in his history.

Since his original introduction in comics, Eros has been featured in various other Marvel-licensed products, including films and video games. The character made his live-action debut in the Marvel Cinematic Universe film Eternals (2021), portrayed by Harry Styles.

== Development ==
=== Concept and creation ===
Eros serves as the opposite reflection of Thanos in nearly every aspect. This contrast aligns with writer-artist Jim Starlin's intention to create two characters embodying semi-Freudian concepts: Thanatos and Eros, representing death and desire. The character was redesigned following his introduction in the Marvel Cinematic Universe (MCU).

=== Publication history ===
Eros debuted in The Invincible Iron Man #55 (February 1973), created by writer and artist Jim Starlin. He appeared in 1968 Captain Marvel series, the 2022 A.X.E.: Judgment Day series, and the 2022 A.X.E.: Starfox one-shot.

== Fictional character biography ==
Eros is a member of the Eternals, a genetic offshoot of humanity, that left for deep space from Earth thousands of years ago and settled on Saturn's moon of Titan. Eros is the youngest son of A'lars (also known as Mentor) and Sui-San, the nephew of Zuras, and the grandnephew of Uranos. He grew up on Titan to be a fun-loving, carefree womanizer and adventurer in contrast to his brother Thanos, a power-hungry, nihilistic conqueror. Only when Thanos launched his first major attack on Titan did Eros begin to take life a bit more seriously.

Years later, in a subsequent campaign of terror by Thanos, Eros battles alongside Titan's handful of survivors. Eros joins the Kree Mar-Vell in battling Thanos's minions. Eros is held captive by Thanos, who revealed that he had killed their mother. Eros is freed from captivity, meets Iron Man and Moondragon, and assists Mar-Vell and the Avengers in battling Thanos. No longer bound by duty on Titan, Eros leaves the war-torn moon, seeking out pleasure and recreation on humanoid-inhabited worlds.

Eros returned to Titan to help console Mar-Vell, who was dying from cancer and retreated to Titan to spend his final days. Just before he died, Mar-Vell made Eros promise to take care of his Titanian companion Elysius after he was gone. Eros honored his vow for several weeks, until Elysius, realizing his wanderlust, released him from his promise. He left Titan and Elysius for Earth. He arrived on Earth, where he sought out and joined the Avengers as a trainee. They admitted him to their training program and the Wasp gave him the name Starfox, since they felt Eros was an inappropriate code-name.

Eros returned to a hedonistic life of adventure, preferring to wander space in search of romance and adventure. He would often return to help the Avengers in their adventures, serving during such cases as the Terminus crisis, Operation: Galactic Storm, and the Nemesis case involving the Infinity Gems and the so-called Ultraverse. When Thanos had gained the Infinity Gauntlet, one of the first things he did was capture Starfox and place him under various torments. Starfox was forced to witness various cosmic murders, power plays, the personal deaths of heroes he knew and other atrocities. He did attempt to charm Thanos out of his plan but had his mouth neutralized for his effort.

Starfox spent time with the son of Mar-Vell, Genis-Vell, and attempted on multiple occasions to assist him and steer him in the right direction. Once, he came up with a device that would block telepathic transmissions during sexual activity.

Starfox was part of a re-gathering of Avengers when Morgan Le Fay attacked all current and ex-members. After an adventure in an alternate universe, Starfox left Earth with Tigra, planning to head towards a known pleasure planet.

Eros and his brother, Thanos, have a custom, where each Eternal year (equivalent to 1,000 Earth years), they bury the hatchet and convene at a neutral place, usually bearing gifts. This was an initiative of their father, who demanded that the two would meet every year as a reminder of the blood that runs through both their veins. The meeting is called The Truce and the two meet alone, although the hero Quasar was present at one of their meetings, and they refuse to fight one another.

Eros is bisexual, having been seen in an orgy in which both males and females serve him sexually; he invited Tryco Slatterus, the Champion of the Universe, to join them, but the latter declined.

=== Allegations of sexual assault ===
Starfox was put on trial for sexual assault, accused of using his powers to seduce a happily married woman. He was defended by lawyer Jennifer Walters, the She-Hulk. The law firm which employed her, Goodman, Lieber, Kurtzberg & Holliway, was contracted by Mentor to defend his son from the allegations. In the course of the trial, Walters came to suspect that Starfox had used his powers on her during their time in the Avengers, resulting in a brief sexual interaction. By this time, Starfox had been banned from the courtroom after it was determined that he was using his special abilities to influence the witnesses. When Walters confronted Starfox with her suspicions via closed-circuit video link, he evaded her questions and then cut the video feed. Walters angrily charged out of the courtroom, transformed into She-Hulk, and caught Starfox as he was attempting to escape from Earth. She-Hulk dealt Starfox a savage beating, giving him no chance to defend his actions, knocked him unconscious, finally duct-taping his mouth shut to ensure that he could not use his abilities to elude punishment. However, Mentor, Starfox's father, effected his son's release by teleporting Starfox away to Titan.

Mentor eventually staged a native Titanian trial in the hopes of clearing his son's name. The Living Tribunal, interested in the equity of the process, called on She-Hulk as prosecuting attorney. Jennifer Walters, in an attempt to get to the bottom of the matter, agreed to a mind probe of both Starfox and herself. She discovered that Starfox did not use his abilities to influence her decision to have sex with him, but that he was deliberately responsible for her sudden infatuation with and marriage to John Jameson. An enraged She-Hulk once more lashed out at Starfox for toying with her life, bringing the legal proceedings to a halt.

Thanos now appeared at the trial and testified that his brother, Starfox, inspired his obsession with Death when they were children, when attempting to make young Thanos accept the death of an animal he had involuntarily killed with his enormous strength. By Titanian law, Eros would thus take full responsibility for all the genocides Thanos had later committed. In the following issue, it was revealed that this was a false memory that Thanos implanted into Starfox's mind and shared by a Thanos clone that the real Thanos sent. Thanos' implantation of the memory is what caused Starfox to briefly become mentally unbalanced and use his power in this manner for the first time. Starfox agreed to have Moondragon shut them off completely rather than risk hurting more people.

=== Return ===
Starfox is later seen living on Titan again, with his abilities restored. He is shown flirting with a number of women, but states that he will not use his powers to woo them. Ultron soon attacks Titan and assimilates the entire population (including Mentor) via a robotic virus, transforming the moon into Planet Ultron. Starfox flees to Earth and meets with the current team of Avengers (now led by the new Captain America), and teams up with them to liberate his world. He plays a key role in the Avengers' victory, using his powers on the half-organic Ultron to force the villain to have an emotional breakdown.

=== Infinity Conflict ===
In Thanos: The Infinity Siblings, after sleeping with different women on Titan, Eros is suddenly teleported into the future by his future self and is left stranded on a prehistoric world. Following a number of years, in the year 2079, his handmade radio finally caught a signal of a ship which rescued Eros. Then in the year 2125, Eros is forced to do an emergency landing due to his ship being damaged. He landed on the planet Zelchia which is ten times the size of Earth with a much higher gravity. Being unable to fly Eros is knocked out by the savage natives who plan to eat him. Thankfully, he is saved by the owl-like mutant native with teleporting powers named only Ghost. Ghost took Eros to his tribe, with the latter promising Ghost to technologically advance his people. After a year Eros bid them farewell and left Zelchia and went to the planet of Shangranna. He trained on the planet for a number of years until in the year 3812 he set this entire world ablaze. Then, in the year 4012, he encounters Kang the Conqueror, whose ship was partially destroyed by the stygian darkness of an omnipotent Thanos from the year 4657. After some negotiating, Kang tells Eros about the omnipotent Thanos losing to Hunger. Eros uses Kang time traveling technology to go back to the point he was originally transported to the future and sending his past self to the same future. After recruiting Pip to this cause, he then goes to Thanos and tells him about his omnipotent future self. He then proposes to Thanos a plan to avoid the darkness from destroying all of reality. After that, Eros and Pip go through time and arrived to the point where Eros first met Kang and stole some of Kang's time-travelling technology. They use the technology to go to the point where Eros departed Zelchia and offers Ghost and his people even more advanced weaponry from the Shi'ar. After a year, Eros manages to unite the planet's three main races to fight the threat of Thanos and his army, which was really all part of his plan. As Thanos and his army are about to attack the people of Zelchia, Eros teleports in front of Thanos and uses some drug to make him appear like Thanos killed him. After regaining himself and berating Thanos for the change of plans, he, Pip, and Ghost return to the present, not knowing that he was secretly manipulated by the future Omnipotent Thanos this whole time.

In Thanos: The Infinity Conflict, after Eros had Isaac miniaturize Kang's technology for easier transport, Eros secretly put a tracking device, utilizing Kang's technology, on an unsuspecting Thanos when the latter and his army were searching for him. After Thanos and his army leave, Adam Warlock and Pip arrive on Titan before Warlock is killed by a missile launched by Thanos. After Eros and Pip inform each other on what is going on, they go to Zelchia the day before Thanos arrives so they can find out what Thanos is planning, but they find that the time line had changed and the planet is completely dead. They then go to Mistress Death's Realms, where they witness Thanos absorbing Death itself. To uncover Thanos' plan, Eros and Pip go one year into the future, where they see that Thanos had already absorbed the majority of the cosmic beings. They then decide to go even further into the future, where they find out that nearly all life of the universe has died out, because of Thanos. Eros decides that the only way to end the Mad Titan's nihilism is to go back to the day Thanos was born and kill the infant before he becomes a threat. As Eros is about to suffocate the baby, Warlock arrives and stops Eros from proceeding, telling him that Thanos' death would all be in vain since he was instrumental in the defeat of Magus. They then return to the present where Warlock kills Eros so his soul could go to Mistress Death's realm. Believing that Eros is planning alongside Thanos, she banishes him from her realm, causing him to be resurrected. When Eros realizes that he now has become a person "out of the norm" just like Thanos and Warlock, he lashes out at Warlock, but Warlock tells him it was necessary, since Eros would be instrumental in defeating Thanos.

In Thanos: The Infinity Ending, when the three arrive at the domain of the Above-All-Others, they found out that they are already too late since future Thanos has already absorbed the Living Tribunal and Above-All-Others. However, thanks to Eros now existing outside the norm, the omniscient omnipresent Thanos could not clearly see him or Adam Warlock at that moment. After escaping the realm, unwillingly leaving Warlock behind, Eros and Pip go to the present Earth, where Eros uses a backpack to keep Pip as near him as possible, thinking that despite, his newfound power, Thanos is still unable to track them down as long as they keep moving through space and time. They go to Thanos' starship, where they witness Thanos erasing the Outriders, Proxima Midnight, and Corvus Glaive from existence, confirming his suspicion that Thanos is now erasing from existence anyone who might interfere with his plan. They decide to go into the future to the point where the universe ends. Upon arriving, they witness future Thanos committing suicide and taking everything in the Multiverse with him. After returning to the present and the destruction of Isaac by Thanos, Eros decides to go to key points in Thanos' life and remind him that he had a brother and that he was loved. This eventually proves to be all in vain because Thanos simply does not care; however, this does allow present Thanos, who had been trapped within the psyche of his future self, to use that little access of power to talk to Eros through his past selves and formulate a plan to stop his future omnipotent self. They go inside the psyche of future Thanos and try to free present Thanos but are finally discovered by future Thanos and assimilated into his universe. Thankfully, Kang, on behalf of Warlock, goes to the point when Eros and Pip are about to go talk to Thanos' past selves and fetches them in his ship. This causes future Thanos to get distracted right as he is about to end everything, which allows present Thanos to take control and reset everything prior to the machinations of his future self. With everything back to normal, Eros is seen drunk at Starlin's Bar at Knowhere, seemingly with no recollection of all of this ordeal, after Kang went through time to prevent Eros from accessing his technology.

=== Forming the Dark Guardians ===
In the aftermath of the "Infinity Wars" story line, Starfox is present at Thanos' funeral. He shows all the guests a recording of Thanos stating that he uploaded his consciousness into a new body before his death. The funeral is attacked by the Black Order, who steals Thanos's body and rips open a hole in space, sending everyone into the rip. Everyone is saved by the arrival of Gladiator and the Shi'ar Empire. Starfox begins to recruit warriors to find Gamora, the most likely candidate to be Thanos's new body, as they form the Dark Guardians, which causes Cosmic Ghost Rider to side with them. Wraith brings up the issue of the Black Order, but Starfox assures they are searching for them, and Nebula states that the team should track down Nova to find Gamora's location. The Dark Guardians find Nova and ambush him, wounding him enough to crash land onto a planet. Wraith demands Nova to tell Gamora's location, stating the fact he does not want to harm him if does not have to. When Gladiator and Cosmic Ghost Rider order him to back off, Nova takes the chance to fly off, but the team plans to track him down again.

Starfox is later kept as an inmate in the Exclusion. Sersi employs Jack of Knives to free Starfox and battle the Progenitor's judgment of Earth.

== Powers and abilities ==
Eros, like other Eternals, possesses superhuman strength, agility, durability, and longevity. He is also immune to disease and has the power of flight. He has the ability to psychically control people's emotions, allowing him to essentially compel anyone to act according to his will, though Eros typically uses his abilities for good. He can utilize psionics to fly at great speeds and manipulate the gravity of people and objects. Eros psionic abilities give him considerable control over his body's cellular structure and the matter around him, allowing him to enhance the durability of his own cells or make minor transmutations to nearby objects. Furthermore, Eros possesses a powerful healing factor, allowing him to recover rapidly from damage, and is virtually immortal.

== Reception ==
Marc Buxton of Den of Geek stated that Eros is recognized for his charm, roguish nature, and adventurous spirit. They found that, as a love god with an appreciation for the finer things in life, Starfox stands out as a distinctive figure. They also suggested that, as Marvel continues to expand its Cinematic Universe, Eros should not be overlooked, as he has the potential to become a key figure—whether as a romantic foil in the Star-Lord and Gamora relationship or as a pivotal character linked to the threat of Thanos.

=== Marvel Cinematic Universe ===
Harry Styles appears as Eros in the mid-credits scene of Eternals (2021). The announcement of casting Styles as Eros elicited mixed reactions from fans, although his appearance was met with "deafening screams and cheers" from the crowd at the premiere of the film on October 18, according to Business Insider. Patrick J. Hetherington of Screen Rant noted that the scene sparked considerable interest, not only due to Styles' fame, but also because it explicitly mentioned Thanos and highlighted Eros' fraternal connection with him.

== Other versions ==
A zombified alternate universe version of Eros from Earth-2149 appears in Marvel Zombies vs. The Army of Darkness.

== In other media ==
- Eros / Starfox appears in Eternals, portrayed by Harry Styles.
- Eros / Starfox appears in What If...? - An Immersive Story, voiced by Bill Champion.
- In 2014, Hasbro released an Eros / Starfox action figure as part of The Infinity Gauntlet line.
