= Drax the Destroyer =

Marvel Comics fictional character

- Textless cover of Drax #1 (November 2015). Art by Scott Hepburn and Matt Milla.

Publication information
- Publisher: Marvel Comics
- First appearance: The Invincible Iron Man #55 (February 1973)
- Created by: Jim Starlin

In-story information
- Alter ego: Arthur Sampson Douglas
- Species: Human mutate
- Place of origin: Burbank, California
- Team affiliations: Guardians of the Galaxy; Infinity Watch; Legion of the Unliving; Phalanx; Secret Defenders; United Front; Nova Corps
- Abilities: Superhuman strength, stamina, speed, reflexes; Excellent swordsman and hand-to-hand combatant; Regeneration; Limited cosmic awareness

Drax the Destroyer (Arthur Sampson Douglas) is a character appearing in American comic books published by Marvel Comics. Created by Jim Starlin, the character first appeared in The Invincible Iron Man #55 (February 1973).

The character's origin story relates that Arthur Douglas was a human whose family was attacked and killed by the supervillain Thanos. Needing a champion to combat Thanos, the being known as Kronos took Arthur's spirit and placed it in a powerful new body, and Drax the Destroyer was born. Drax's powers included enhanced strength and resilience, flight, and the ability to project energy blasts from his hands. The character often battled Thanos, and on occasion the superheroes Captain Marvel and Adam Warlock. He was also a member of the group known as the Infinity Watch.

In 2004, the character lost his flight and energy blasts, and a portion of his strength and resilience. This version of the character played a role in the crossover comic book storylines "Annihilation" and "Annihilation: Conquest", and became a member of the relaunched Guardians of the Galaxy.

Drax has been featured in a variety of associated Marvel merchandise, including animated television series, action figures, and video games. Dave Bautista portrayed the character in the Marvel Cinematic Universe films Guardians of the Galaxy (2014), Guardians of the Galaxy Vol. 2 (2017), Avengers: Infinity War (2018), Avengers: Endgame (2019), Thor: Love and Thunder, The Guardians of the Galaxy Holiday Special (both 2022) and Guardians of the Galaxy Vol. 3 (2023). Drax also appears in the Disney+ animated series What If...? (2021).

== Creation ==
Starlin commented on the character's creation stating "In the beginning, Drax was versatile, because I didn't know what the hell to do with him," Starlin confessed. "He was an element; he was supposed to be Thanos' Kryptonite. I sort of drifted away from that idea, and when I came back to using him, I made a big change in him. I brain-damaged him and made him into the Hulk, because Marvel didn't have a dumb green thing at the time, and I thought they should. And so I sort of made him like that. Later on they wanted to change his visuals, which I had no problem with because I was never crazy about that costume. It didn't make a lot of sense. I wasn't invested enough in the character to go back and do anything more with it."

Starlin later commented in an interview that "I ripped off my own costume, I redesigned Dr. Weird's costume at Texas Trio and pretty much just used it as Drax's costume, Drax was going to be Thanos's kryptonite that's why he was green."

== Publication history ==
Drax first appeared in The Invincible Iron Man #55 (February 1973), and was created by Jim Starlin with the help of writer Mike Friedrich. He had a recurring role in Captain Marvel, beginning with issue #27 (July 1973). He also appeared in Warlock #10 (December 1975), Iron Man #88 (July 1976), Warlock #15 (November 1976), Logan's Run #6 (June 1977), Thor #314 (December 1981), and Avengers #219 (May 1982), before being killed by Moondragon in The Avengers #220 (June 1982).

Starlin resurrected Drax in Silver Surfer vol. 3 #35 (1990), and he had a recurring role until issue 50. After appearing in The Infinity Gauntlet #1–6 (1991), he was featured in Warlock and the Infinity Watch #1–42 (1992–1995) as a member of the titular team, the Infinity Watch. The character reappeared in Warlock vol. 3 #1–4 (1998–1999) and Captain Marvel vol. 4 #4–6 (2001).

Drax received an eponymous 4 issue miniseries in 2004, and was a starring character in Annihilation: Nova #1–4 (2005) and Annihilation #1–6 (2006). After a follow-up appearance in Nova vol. 4 #4–7 (2007) and the 2008 "Annihilation: Conquest" storyline, he was featured as a team member in the 2008 relaunch of Guardians of the Galaxy, and appeared in the 25 issue series of the same name. The character had a small role in The Thanos Imperative #1–3 (2010), in which he was killed.

The character reappeared in Avengers Assemble issues #4–8 (June–October 2012), with no reference to his death. He then starred in Guardians of the Galaxy vol. 3, a part of the Marvel NOW! relaunch.

== Fictional character biography ==
=== Creation and early life ===
While driving through a desert with his wife and daughter, Arthur Douglas' car is attacked by a spaceship piloted by Thanos, who thinks the humans have seen him. His daughter, Heather, survives the crash and is adopted by Thanos' father, Mentor, and raised on Titan. She later becomes Moondragon.

Drax (top) on the cover of Captain Marvel #58 (September 1978). Art by Dave Cockrum.

Needing a champion to combat the threat from Thanos, Mentor and his father Kronos capture Douglas' spirit and place it in a powerful new body. He is rechristened "Drax the Destroyer", and his sole purpose is to kill Thanos. With Iron Man, Drax battles Thanos and the Blood Brothers, but Thanos escapes. While trying to prevent Thanos from getting the Cosmic Cube, Drax's memories are restored to him. After seeing Captain Marvel defeat Thanos, Drax attacks Captain Marvel for robbing him of his purpose. Drax wanders space in grim contemplation, searching for a resurrected Thanos. By the time he learns that Thanos had managed to rematerialize himself, Thanos has once again been destroyed in battle with Captain Marvel, the Avengers, and Adam Warlock. Alongside Captain Marvel, Drax battles ISAAC, Stellarax, Lord Gaea, Elysius, and Chaos.

Some time later, Drax, possessed by an alien entity, battles his daughter Moondragon and the superhero Thor. After Drax recovers, he and Moondragon journey through space in search of knowledge. Eventually, they come upon the planet Ba-Banis, which is inhabited by humanoid aliens caught in a vast civil war. Moondragon uses her mental powers to quell the conflict and then decides to set herself up as the world's goddess. Drax recognizes that her ambitions are ignoble and so sends their ship to Earth with a holographic distress message. The Avengers respond and discover Moondragon's world of mentally enforced tranquility. Freed by the Avengers from his daughter's mental domination, Drax advances toward her, seeking to end her menace. To stop him, Moondragon mentally forces Drax's life essence to vacate his artificial body.

=== Infinity Watch ===
When Thanos is resurrected by Mistress Death, Kronos reanimates the Destroyer and grants him increased physical power. However, Kronos does not consider the effects of Drax's death, and the Destroyer's mind retains the damage done by Moondragon. Alongside a multitude of other heroes, Drax helps battle Thanos and Nebula for possession of the Infinity Gauntlet. Drax is chosen by Adam Warlock to safeguard the Power Gem as part of the Infinity Watch.

After the energy vampire Rune steals the gems, the Watch members go their separate ways. Drax returns to Titan with Moondragon, who successfully petitions Kronos to restore Drax's mind to its former acuity at the cost of some physical power. Thus, Drax is restored to his original condition. Drax is accused of the murder of Elysius and several others, but is cleared when it is discovered that the creature Syphon was manipulating him. While seeking out Moondragon, Drax enters into an altercation with Genis-Vell. In the course of this struggle, Drax is transported to the Microverse with Genis, where, for a time, he finds acceptance and happiness on the planet K'ai.

=== Reborn ===
Later, Drax is seen on a prison transport ship with Paibok, Lunatik, and the Blood Brothers. The ship crashes in Alaska, and Drax attacks the others to keep them from harming innocent lives. He mistakes a young girl named Cammi for his daughter, and tries to protect her from Paibok. Drax appears to be killed, but a slimmer, smarter Drax emerges from the larger shell of the dead body. When a second prison ship arrives to recapture the prisoners, both Drax and Cammi are arrested.

Surviving Annihilus' attack on the intergalactic prison known as the Kyln, Drax and Cammi team up with the last member of the Xandarian Nova Corps, Richard Rider. Together they fight against the advancing Annihilation Wave as Drax trains Nova to be a warrior. Drax learns that Thanos has taken Moondragon hostage, and that she will be killed if Drax pursues him. During a doomed battle between the Annihilation Wave and the United Front, Drax stays behind to fight off the invaders while Nova and the rest of the group (including Cammi) finish the evacuation. Drax fights his way to the Annihilation Wave's mother ship, where he finds Thanos and kills him. Drax helps to free a captive Galactus, who teleports Moondragon and Drax to a far-off planet to spare them from his wrath on the Annihilation Wave. Afterwards, Moondragon says Drax just "disappeared". Cammi is later seen, alive, allied with Skreet, one of Thanos' assistants.

When the Phalanx invade the Kree home-world, Drax is assimilated as a "select" of the Phalanx hive mind. They dispatch him, along with Gamora, to apprehend Nova, who had fled the planet. Following Nova to Kvch, the home planet the Technarchy (parental race of the Phalanx), Drax and Gamora are freed from the Phalanx by the Technarch Tyro. Together, they return to Hala, where they help in the defeat of Ultron.

=== Guardians of the Galaxy ===
Star-Lord recruits Drax for the new Guardians of the Galaxy. The Guardians are forced to ally themselves with a resurrected Thanos and travel into an alternate reality known as the "Cancerverse". While experiencing a bout of madness, Drax attacks Thanos and is killed. Drax later reappears with the Guardians on Earth without reference to his death.

== Powers and abilities ==
Drax's initial incarnation's powers included superhuman strength, stamina and resistance to physical injury as well the ability to project concussive blasts of cosmic energy from his hands. He could also travel at high speeds in outer space and hyperspace without air, food, or water. Drax also had telepathy, having used it to engage Thanos in a psychic battle and stalemating him mind to mind.

After his resurrection, his physical capabilities are greatly enhanced beyond their original levels but he suffered severe mental disability in his new incarnation. Instead of his telepathy which enabled him to track Thanos across vast distances, Drax could sense either him or other beings who have been in recent contact with Thanos, alongside a precognitive ability to sense when beings will be in contact with Thanos in the near future. For a time, Drax possessed the Power Gem that had the potential to grant him superhuman physical and energy manipulation powers with no feasible limit. However, because of his severely-reduced intellect, he lacked the mental capacity and imagination to use the gem for anything other than bolstering his physical strength. While possessing the gem, Drax's strength has been compared with that of the merged incarnation of the Hulk, but lacking the latter's rage-fueled potential.

Shortly before the 2006 "Annihilation" mini-series and continuing through the present, Drax undergoes a physical change, resulting in a much-smaller physical form, reduced physical abilities comparable to those of his original form, and the loss of his energy projection, flight, and most of his psionic abilities. At least temporarily, he had the ability to pass through Thanos's force field; his power levels seem to increase the closer he is to Thanos. He could also heal at an accelerated rate and had senses sharp enough to tell humans from aliens by smell, root out a Skrull in disguise, and detect when energy weapons were about to go off.

== In other media ==
=== Television ===
- Drax appears in the Silver Surfer episode "Learning Curve", voiced by Norm Spencer. This version is a cyborg with a mechanical body and organic brain, and companion of Mentor.
- Drax the Destroyer appears in Ultimate Spider-Man, voiced by David Sobolov.
- Drax the Destroyer appears in the Avengers Assemble episode "Guardians and Space Knights", voiced again by David Sobolov.
- Drax the Destroyer appears in Hulk and the Agents of S.M.A.S.H., voiced again by David Sobolov.
- Drax the Destroyer appears in Marvel Disk Wars: The Avengers, voiced by Yoshinori Sonobe in Japanese.
- Drax the Destroyer appears in Guardians of the Galaxy, voiced again by David Sobolov.
- Drax appears in Lego Marvel Super Heroes – Guardians of the Galaxy: The Thanos Threat, voiced again by David Sobolov.

=== Marvel Cinematic Universe ===
Dave Bautista as Drax in the 2017 film Guardians of the Galaxy Vol. 2.

Drax the Destroyer appears in media set in the Marvel Cinematic Universe, portrayed by Dave Bautista. He first appears in the live-action film Guardians of the Galaxy (2014) before making subsequent appearances in the live-action films Guardians of the Galaxy Vol. 2 (2017), Avengers: Infinity War (2018), Avengers: Endgame (2019), Thor: Love and Thunder (2022), and Guardians of the Galaxy Vol. 3 (2023). Additionally, Bautista reprises his role in The Guardians of the Galaxy Holiday Special (2022) while an alternate timeline version of Drax appears in the Disney+ animated series What If...?, voiced by Fred Tatasciore. This version of the character is noted as having an alien origin rather than originating as a human on Earth, with him losing his wife and daughter to Thanos and Ronan the Accuser in an onslaught on his planet and declaring revenge on them.

=== Video games ===
- Drax makes a cameo appearance in Marvel Super Heroes.
- Drax appears as an unlockable character in Marvel Avengers Alliance.
- Drax appears as an unlockable assist character in Marvel Heroes, voiced again by David Sobolov.
- Drax appears as a playable character in Marvel Puzzle Quest.
- Drax the Destroyer appears as a playable character in Lego Marvel Super Heroes, voiced again by David Sobolov.
- Drax appears as a playable character in Disney Infinity 2.0, voiced again by David Sobolov.
- Drax appears as an unlockable playable character in Marvel Contest of Champions.
- Drax appears as a playable character in Marvel: Future Fight.
- Drax appears as a playable character in Disney Infinity 3.0, voiced again by David Sobolov.
- Drax appears in Marvel Avengers Academy, voiced again by David Sobolov.
- Drax appears in Guardians of the Galaxy: The Telltale Series, voiced by Brandon Paul Eells. This version is a Kathatian alien whose wife and daughter were both killed by Thanos.
- Drax appears as a playable character in Lego Marvel Super Heroes 2.
- Drax appears as a playable character in Marvel Strike Force, voiced by Dave Bautista.
- Drax appears in Marvel's Guardians of the Galaxy, voiced by Jason Cavalier.
- Drax appears as a playable character in Marvel Ultimate Alliance 3: The Black Order, voiced again by Brandon Paul Eells.
- Drax appears as a purchasable outfit in Fortnite: Battle Royale.

== Collected editions ==
Title	Material Collected	Publication Date	ISBN
Drax: Guardian of the Galaxy	Iron Man (vol. 1) #55; Captain Marvel (vol. 2) #27-33, #43-44, #58-62; Warlock (vol. 1) #15; Marvel Spotlight (vol. 2) #1-2; Avengers (vol. 1) #219-220; material from Logan's Run #6; Thor (vol. 1) #314 and Marvel Graphic Novel #1	August 2016	978-1302902131
Drax the Destroyer: Earthfall	Drax: The Destroyer #1-4	March 2006	978-0785118060
Drax Vol. 1: Galaxy's Best Detective	Drax #1-5	May 2016	978-0785196624
Drax Vol. 2: The Children's Crusade	Drax #6-11	November 2016	978-0785196631
