= Mentor (A'lars) =

Marvel Comics fictional character

Publication information
- Publisher: Marvel Comics
- First appearance: Iron Man #55 (February 1973)
- Created by: Jim Starlin (writer / artist)

In-story information
- Alter ego: A'lars
- Team affiliations: Eternals
- Abilities: Superhuman stamina and durability Ability to project cosmic energy Molecular manipulation Telepathy

Mentor (A'lars) is a fictional character appearing in American comic books published by Marvel Comics. The character first appeared in Iron Man #55 (February 1973), and was created by Jim Starlin.

Mentor is the leader of the Titanian colony, and the father of Thanos and Starfox, the adoptive father of Moondragon, the son of Kronos, the brother of Zuras, and the nephew of Uranos. His back-story was based on Greek mythology. Some years later, he was retconned to be a member of the Eternals, a race in the Marvel Universe created by Jack Kirby, separately based on Greek mythology.

== Fictional character biography ==
A'lars is the second son of Kronos and Daina, two of the first generation of the Eternals, and was born eons ago in the city of Titanos. A'lars and his brother Zuras were raised in the aftermath of the great civil war which divided the first colony of Eternals. Their father, Kronos, who was on the winning side of the civil war, toiled away in his laboratory attempting to discover the secrets of the self-regenerating cosmic life force that he felt his race was capable of attaining. A force field cylinder containing cosmic energy exploded, disintegrating Kronos' body and giving immortality to all nearby Eternals. A'lars then became a scientist like his father.

A'lars and Zuras, both adults at the time of Kronos's death, held a general assembly to determine who would succeed him. The assembly chose Zuras, so A'lars chose to leave the colony to avoid the sort of fraternal rivalry that led Kronos and his brother Uranos to the first civil war. He settled on Saturn's moon Titan, taking over as leader of the underground colony that his uncle Uranos had built centuries earlier.

Upon arriving on Titan, A'lars discovered the Uranian Eternal Sui-San, the sole survivor of the civil war that destroyed the Eternals of Titan previously. Sui-San bore two children for Mentor, Thanos and Eros (later known as Starfox). Sui-San died in Thanos' first major attack against Titan.

Mentor later meets Rick Jones and Captain Mar-Vell. With his son Eros, he informs Jones and Mar-Vell of Thanos's degradation of Titan. Mentor enlists Mar-Vell's aid against Thanos. Mentor is imprisoned by Thanos, but freed by Mar-Vell. Mentor joined in the battle against Thanos. Later, Mentor joins in the attempt to cure Mar-Vell of cancer, and attends Mar-Vell's last hours.

Thanos escapes captivity and reclaims his Black Order forces from Corvus Glaive. After retaking command of his Black Quadrant outpost, Thanos discovers that he is dying. Thanos tries to force Mentor to find a cure for his malady, but kills him when he is unable to.

A'lars is later resurrected and trapped in the Exclusion, a pocket dimension where the Eternals are resurrected after death.

== Powers and abilities ==
As a member of the Eternals, Mentor has superhuman stamina and durability, and a gifted intellect. He possesses various superhuman powers, including the ability to project cosmic energy as waves of concussive force and the ability to manipulate matter on the molecular level. Mentor has displayed telepathic abilities, the limits of which are as yet unknown.

Mentor has knowledge of science and technology far in advance of present-day Earth. As ruler of Titan, Mentor has access to and full use of a wide range of advanced technology located on that artificial moon.

== In other media ==
Mentor appears in the Silver Surfer episode "Learning Curve", voiced by Cedric Smith. He is said to be Thanos' brother instead of Starfox due to a typographical error in the script.
