= Kronos (comics) =

- Kronos (far left) with the cosmic pantheon on the cover of Infinity Gauntlet #5. (November 1991). Art by Ron Lim.

Publication information
- Publisher: Marvel Comics
- First appearance: Iron Man #55 (February 1972)
- Created by: Jim Starlin (writer / artist)

In-story information
- Alter ego: Kronos
- Species: Cosmic being
- Team affiliations: Eternals
- Notable aliases: Titan God of Time; Father of Fathers; Chronos
- Abilities: Superhuman intelligence; Time manipulation; Telepathy

Kronos (UK: /ˈkroʊnɒs/, US: /ˈkroʊnoʊs/) (also spelled as Chronos) is a character appearing in American comic books published by Marvel Comics. Created by Jim Starlin, the character first appeared in Iron Man #55 (February 1972). Kronos is a cosmic being who is the embodiment of time. He is the brother of Uranos. He is also the grandfather of the supervillain Thanos.

== Publication history ==
Kronos debuted in Iron Man #55 (February 1972), created by Jim Starlin. He appeared in the 1968 Captain Marvel series. He appeared in 1987 Silver Surfer series. He appeared briefly in the 1989 Quasar series. He appeared in the limited series 1991 Infinity Gauntlet series. He appeared in the 1992 Warlock and the Infinity Watch series.

== Fictional character biography ==
Kronos was originally one of the immortal Eternals, and led a rebellion against his tyrannical brother Uranos. After a successful coup, Kronos fathered the Eternals Zuras and A'lars (also known as Mentor, the present leader of the Titanian Eternals), before being accidentally atomized during a botched experiment. The character's spirit survives, continuing to exist in astral form with amplified powers and abilities.

Kronos saves the soul of Arthur Douglas, killed by a barrage from the ship of the Titan, Thanos. He subsequently uses Douglas' soul to create Drax the Destroyer, a being intended to kill Thanos, his own grandson.

Thanos comes into possession of the artifact the Cosmic Cube and uses it to imprison Kronos, who is eventually freed when Thanos is defeated by the Kree hero Mar-Vell and the Avengers.

Kronos realizes that the entity Death has restored Thanos to life, and, in response, the character restores an at-the-time deceased Drax to life, to hunt Thanos once again (with an increase in physical power at the cost of his mental acuity).

He encounters the disembodied spirit of villain Maelstrom, and glimpses Infinity when the entity manifests.

Alongside the combined cosmic pantheon of the Marvel universe, he attempts to stop Thanos, who at the time wields the Infinity Gems.

Kronos listens to the entreaties of the heroine Moondragon, and restores Drax – her father when Arthur Douglas – to his original, thinking state.

== Powers and abilities ==
Kronos lost his physical form due to an explosion caused by an experiment gone wrong. He became a time entity with the ability to achieve virtually any effect by willing it. He possesses the power of telepathy. Kronos has a form of cosmic awareness that grants him to have a metaphysical insight in space and time. He can control the souls of those who died. He occasionally manifests as a huge translucent humanoid so certain beings can perceive him.

== Reception ==
- In 2021, CBR.com ranked Kronos 1st in their "15 Most Powerful Eternals" list.
- In 2021, Screen Rant ranked Kronos 1st in their "10 Most Powerful Members Of The Eternals" list.
