= Titan (Marvel Comics location) =

Home of an extraterrestrial race in the Marvel universe

- First appearance: Iron Man #55 (Feb 1973)
- Race: Eternals
- Publisher: Marvel Comics
- Creators: Jim Starlin (writer); Mike Friedrich (artist)

Titan is a fictional location appearing in American comic books published by Marvel Comics. It is depicted in the Marvel Universe as the home of the Titanian Eternals on Saturn's moon Titan. It first appeared in Iron Man #55 (Feb 1973) and was created by Jim Starlin and Mike Friedrich. The Titanians, also known as Titans, were later retconned as being an offshoot of the Eternals, which had been created separately by Jack Kirby.

Titan appeared in the 2018 film Avengers: Infinity War and 2019 film Avengers: Endgame as a ruined planet and the former home of Thanos.

== Fictional history ==
The colony of Titanian Eternals was founded about 750,000 years ago in the aftermath of a devastating civil war among the first generation of Earth's Eternals. The Eternals Uranos and Kronos led opposing factions, which clashed in a conflict of ideals over the Eternals' destiny as a people. Kronos' side prevailed, and Uranos and his surviving followers were exiled into space and landed on the planet Uranus. There, they discovered a supply depot guarded by a Kree Sentry. When the Eternals destroyed the Sentry and raided the outpost, the Kree armada came to investigate, believing Earth's solar system to be devoid of intelligent life. The Eternals were forced to crash on the moon Titan, where they founded a colony while hiding from the Kree. These Eternals eventually died after a series of conflict, with Sui-San as the sole survivor. Mentor, who had gone into voluntary exile, arrived on Titan and took command.

== Named inhabitants of Titan ==
- Chaos – Cloned being created by ISAAC, while acting under Thanos' control.
- The Cotati – A plant-like alien species who resided on Titan under the protection of the Priests of Pama.
- Demeityr – Young Titan companion of Sundragon.
- Dionysus – A cloned being created by ISAAC, while acting under Thanos' control.
- Dr. Aurilius – Titan Medic.
- Dragon of the Moon – A dragon-like demon who was imprisoned on Titan.
- Elysius – A cloned being created by ISAAC, while acting under Thanos' control. She betrayed ISAAC and allied with Mar-Vell.
- Emlot
- Genis-Vell – The cloned child of Mar-Vell and Elysius.
- ISAAC (Integral Synaptic Anti+/Anionic Computer) – A moon-wide computer that controls all systems.
- Kazantra – One of Mentor's wives.
- Lord Gaea – Cloned being created by ISAAC, while acting under Thanos' control.
- Mentor
- Monks of Shao Lom – The mentors of Moondragon.
- Moondragon (Heather Douglas) – Adopted by Mentor and raised on Titan.
- Phyla-Vell – The cloned child of Mar-Vell and Elysius.
- Priests of Pama – Pacifistic Kree who protect the Cotati.
- Shastra –
- Starfox (Eros) – Thanos' brother.
- Stellarax – A cloned nihilistic terrorist created by ISAAC, while acting under Thanos' control.
- Sui-San – Mother of Starfox and Thanos.
- Sundragon – Cousin of Moondragon and companion of Demeityr.
- Thanos
- Thyrio
- Tycho
- Uranos

== In other media ==
=== Television ===
- Titan appears in the Avengers Assemble episode "Thanos Rising".
- Titan appears in the Guardians of the Galaxy episode "Titan Up".

=== Film ===
Titan appears in media set in the Marvel Cinematic Universe (MCU).

- Introduced in Avengers: Infinity War, this version of Titan is a habitable exoplanet that was left in ruin due to overpopulation, which Thanos tried to prevent by exterminating half the population.
- In Avengers: Endgame, Doctor Strange brings the Spider-Man and Guardians from Titan to Earth via a portal.
- An alternate universe version of Titan appears in a flashback in Doctor Strange in the Multiverse of Madness.
