= Captain Marvel (Khn'nr) =

- Cover to Captain Marvel (vol. 6) #4; Art by Ed McGuiness.

Publication information
- Publisher: Marvel Comics
- First appearance: Civil War: The Return (March 2007)
- Created by: Paul Jenkins (writer); Tom Raney (artist)

In-story information
- Full name: Khn'nr
- Species: Skrull
- Place of origin: Skrull Empire
- Team affiliations: Church of Hala; Skrull Empire
- Notable aliases: Mar-Vell
- Abilities: Superhuman strength; Shapeshifting; Flight; Master unarmed combatant; Wields Skrull-made Nega-Bands; Extensive knowledge of technologically advanced Kree vehicles and devices

Khn'nr is a character appearing in American comic books published by Marvel Comics. Created by Paul Jenkins and Tom Raney, the character first appeared in Civil War: The Return (March 2007). Khn'nr is a Skrull sleeper agent posing as the Kree Mar-Vell (also known as Captain Marvel).

The shapeshifting Skrull Khn'nr is bonded with the DNA of Mar-Vell to lock his body into Mar-Vell's form and given technological replicas of the Kree Nega-Bands. However, his mental conditioning is botched, causing Khn'nr's personality to be erased and leaving the Mar-Vell persona dominant. Though part of the Skrull invasion of Earth, this Captain Marvel decides to fight against the invading Skrulls.

== Publication history ==
In 2007, Mar-Vell supposedly returned to the Marvel Universe during Marvel's Civil War crossover storyline. He made his appearance in the "Civil War: The Return" one-shot, written by Paul Jenkins. It was later revealed that this was in fact a Skrull named Khn'nr during the 2008 Captain Marvel mini-series, which spun out of the events of his Civil War appearance.

== Fictional character biography ==
As part of the Skrull Secret Invasion, a shapeshifting Skrull called Khn'nr is locked into the shape of the late Mar-Vell, the first Captain Marvel, and given replicas of the Kree Nega-Bands. Khn'nr receives memory implants to turn him into a sleeper agent making him believe he is Captain Marvel until the time of the invasion, when a psychological trigger would be activated to return him to his Skrull persona.

To explain his comeback from death, Khn'nr is made to believe he was transported to the present day by an anomaly in space-time created during the construction of Negative Zone Prison Alpha. Initially unsure of how to approach the situation, the Earth's heroes reveal Mar-Vell's history to him but also offer him a place as a warden for the prison.

He is later called in to help the pro-registration heroes who revived him, at the end of the 2007 "Civil War" storyline; however upon seeing the chaos they are causing, he departs to France, where he spends all of his time observing a painting of Alexander the Great in the Louvre and contemplates Alexander's similarities to himself. This painting is meant to be his psychological trigger, but due to an error in the methods of Skrull scientists, Mar-Vell retains his personality and memories prior to his Skrull captivity. Most of Khn'nr's personality was accidentally erased as a byproduct of the botched mental conditioning, leaving the Mar-Vell persona dominant.

When Khn'nr learns the truth and becomes fully aware of his true identity, he decides to embrace Mar-Vell's memories and rebel against the Skrulls and protect Earth from their invasion. However, Khn'nr is mortally wounded by a Super-Skrull and crash-lands on Earth. He is found by Noh-Varr, who he encourages to continue Captain Marvel's legacy before dying.

== Powers and abilities ==
Though a Skrull, Khn'nr has the memories, knowledge, and skills of the Kree, Mar-Vell; presumably including Mar-Vell's Kree military training giving him mastery of all forms of Kree unarmed combat, as well as extensive knowledge of the technologically advanced vehicles and devices of the Kree Empire. It is unknown if the botched mental conditioning has left Khn'nr any of his previous Skrull knowledge.

The Skrulls also developed technological replicas of the Kree Nega-Bands, though it is unknown if these work in the same fashion as the Kree version which converted Mar-Vell's psionic energy into strength, a high degree of imperviousness to harm, the ability to project force blasts, survive in space and the power to fly at faster-than-light speeds, though the bands do give him the exact same abilities. They are also fully compatible with the originals, as seen when Ms. Marvel, armed with the original Nega-Bands, is able to banish him in the Negative Zone by clicking her wrist on his.

== Reception ==
=== Accolades ===
- In 2017, Den of Geek ranked Khn'nr 3rd in their "Guardians of the Galaxy 3: 50 Marvel Characters We Want to See" list.
- In 2018, CBR.com ranked Khn'nr 12th in their "Every Captain Marvel Ever" list.
- In 2019, CBR.com ranked Khn'nr 9th in their "Every Version Of Captain Marvel" list and 8th in their "All The Captain Marvels, Ranked" list.

== Literary reception ==
=== Volumes ===
==== Captain Marvel - 2007 ====
According to Diamond Comic Distributors, Captain Marvel #1 was the 49th best selling comic book in November 2007. Captain Marvel #2 was the 68th best selling comic book in December 2007.

Jesse Schedeen of IGN gave Captain Marvel #1 a grade of 8.6 out of 10, writing, "Brian Reed and Lee Weeks wouldn't have topped my list for a killer Captain Marvel team (no pun intended), but they certainly make a case for themselves... In many ways Weeks evokes memories of Jim Starlin's work on The Death of Captain Marvel. If this series is eliciting favorable comparisons to that classic story already, I think we're in for a marvelously good time (har har)."

Schedeen gave Captain Marvel #2 a grade of 8.7 out of 10, saying, "Lee Weeks is a name that hasn't graced many Marvel covers lately, but I hope that will change after this mini-series. Weeks is one of many similarly-accomplished noir artists at Marvel. His stark, realistic pencils aren't what I would have initially expected from this book, but his style wound up being a perfect fit. I highly recommend giving this series a look if you're still on the fence. I just don't think any supposed connection to Secret Invasion should be a motivating factor."

== Collected editions ==
Title	Material collected	Publication date	ISBN
Captain Marvel: Secret Invasion	Captain Marvel (vol. 6) #1-5, Civil War: The Return	August 13, 2008	ISBN 978-0-7851-3303-2
