= Megaton (comics) =

Fictional character

Megaton is a fictional character appearing in American comic books published by Marvel Comics. The character first appeared in Captain Marvel #22 (September 1972).

== Fictional character biography ==
Jules Carter was transformed by nuclear energy into Megaton, and was defeated by Mar-Vell.
