= Moondragon =

Marvel Comics superhero

Heather Douglas Moondragon
- Heather Douglas / Moondragon. Textless cover of Guardians of the Galaxy vol. 6 #5 (August 2020). Art by Ivan Shavrin.

Publication information
- Publisher: Marvel Comics
- First appearance: As Madam MacEvil: Iron Man #54 (January 1973); As Moondragon: Daredevil #105 (November 1973)
- Created by: Bill Everett; Mike Friedrich; George Tuska

In-story information
- Full name: Heather Douglas
- Species: Human
- Team affiliations: Guardians of the Galaxy; Infinity Watch; Defenders; Avengers
- Notable aliases: Dragon of the Moon; Madame MacEvil; H.D. Steckley; Moondragon; Moon Lady
- Abilities: Dragon transformation granting: Superhuman strength, speed, and durability; Flaming breath; Flight; Telekinesis; Telepath; Highly skilled geneticist and engineer; Experienced starship pilot; Master martial artist

Moondragon (Heather Douglas) is a character appearing in American comic books published by Marvel Comics. Created by Bill Everett, Mike Friedrich, and George Tuska, the character first appeared in Iron Man #54 (January 1973).

Moondragon is a superhero who has gained extraordinary talents strictly through extreme degrees of personal regimen with the monks of Titan, with access to a wide array of psionic abilities. She is one of the most powerful telepaths on Earth, and also has telekinesis and the ability to transform into a dragon. She has been a member of the Avengers, Defenders, The Infinity Watch and Guardians of the Galaxy.

== Publication history ==
Moondragon debuted in Iron Man #54 (January 1973), created by Bill Everett, Mike Friedrich, and George Tuska. She appeared in the 2007 Annihilation: Conquest series, the 2019 Guardians of the Galaxy series, and the 2020 Guardians of the Galaxy series, by writer Al Ewing.

== Fictional character biography ==
=== Origin ===
Heather Douglas was born in Los Angeles, California, daughter of Arthur and Yvette Steckley Douglas. When Heather was still a girl, her father was driving her and her mother through the desert when they accidentally happened to see the spaceship of Thanos land; the space villain did not want any witnesses, so he destroyed their car. Heather was thrown clear and survived, but her parents were killed. She would later discover that her father's soul was bound into a new body, becoming Drax the Destroyer. She was found by Thanos' father, Mentor, who took her to his home world, Titan, to be raised by the monks of Shao-Lom.

From the monks, Heather develops her body to its full potential, becoming a formidable martial artist. They teach Heather scientific disciplines such as chemistry and genetic engineering; but most significantly, they help Heather tap into the latent psionic powers present within all humans. Heather is able to develop her mental powers far beyond those of her teachers, so much so that she eventually mentally contacts a powerful entity called the Dragon of the Moon. The Dragon immediately tries to corrupt and take her over, but she fights back, driving the Dragon away. This fills her with pride and an overwhelming sense of superiority. To commemorate her victory, she takes the name Moondragon. Unknown to Heather, the Dragon continues to influence her on a subconscious level.

Heather's choice of the name Moondragon causes an uproar amongst the monks of Shao-Lom, so much so that Mentor has to confront her on the matter. After the confrontation, Moondragon is approached by Runner, one of the Elders of the Universe. Runner takes Moondragon on a tour of the universe, showing her its fantastic sights and wonders. Runner eventually takes Moondragon to the surface of a sun. He informs her that the sun would go nova in several years. Moondragon points out to Runner that the sun harbored an inhabited planet and that they should warn the inhabitants. Runner regretfully responds that, when he chose the path of freedom, he lost the option to interfere with others' destinies. Moondragon argues, "What good is freedom?" when it only leads to death. When Runner fails to answer her satisfactorily, she requests to be brought back home.

Sometime later, Thanos attacks Titan, destroying the monastery and the Shao-Lom monks. Moondragon escapes in her spaceship and flees to Earth.

=== Alliances against Thanos and Korvac ===
She first returns to Earth under the guise of "Madame MacEvil" to develop a means to combat Thanos. This leads to the creation of villains like Angar the Screamer, Ramrod, and the Dark Messiah. In her first appearance, she forces Iron Man to battle Namor in order to study them. She then reveals her true identity and helps the Avengers in their first confrontation with Thanos. She battles Daredevil but is nearly killed by her ex-ally Kerwin J. Broderick. She restores Daredevil's sight briefly with her alien pressure point skills and then first meets Mar-Vell. She aids them against Angar, the Dark Messiah, and Terrex. She falls in love with Daredevil but then returns to outer space. She aids Captain Mar-Vell, Drax, and the Avengers against Thanos.

Moondragon is one of the three candidates to be the "Celestial Madonna", who was prophesied to give birth to a universal savior, but she loses to Mantis. She then becomes an adventurer and joins the Avengers. Her time with the team is short, ending when she meets the heroine Hellcat and takes her to Titan to train her. The following year Moondragon returns to help the Avengers battle Thanos.

When the Avengers confront Korvac, Moondragon's powers allow her to see into his mind, and she decides that his goal of saving the universe by ruling it is noble. She stays out of the battle until Korvac, dejected, commits suicide.

=== Paths of corruption and redemption ===
Moondragon leaves Earth with Drax and finds a planet immersed in war, so she decides to take mental control of all its inhabitants to force them to live in peace, setting herself up as their "peace goddess.” Drax summons the Avengers to intervene and in the resultant confrontation, Moondragon is forced to kill her father with her mental powers. Afterward, Thor takes her before a real god — his father, Odin — to be judged. Odin perceives within Moondragon a stalwart but tainted spirit. He condemns her to wear a magical headband that reduces her mental powers until she has overcome her arrogance and learned humility. He also assigns Valkyrie to be her guardian.

When Valkyrie rejoins the Defenders, Moondragon is forced to come along. At first, she sends out low level telepathic signals, luring threats to the vicinity of the Defenders' headquarters, hoping that one of these threats would remove her headband or force the Defenders to remove the headband so she may use her powers to aid them unhindered.

Despite the fact that Moondragon resents being with the Defenders, she wants to be accepted by them as a good person. In an encounter with Asgardian trolls, Moondragon resists the temptation of letting the trolls and the Dragon of the Moon remove her headband, thus proving herself to Odin, who promptly lets the headband fall off.

This personal victory is short-lived, for soon afterwards the Defenders have to fight the spawns of the mutated spores they fought months before. The spawns soon coalesce into a single gargantuan monster, which Moondragon vanquishes with the help of the Gargoyle. Unknown to Moondragon, in doing so, she is infected with the mutated spores. She does not find out about the infection until weeks later, when the spores have supplanted a good portion of her own internal organs. The Dragon of the Moon appears again and tells her it can save her life, but only if she agrees to be its host. Moondragon initially turns down its offer, knowing that it will use her to kill the Defenders. The Dragon then mocks Moondragon's sentimentality by showing her what the other Defenders are saying about her behind her back even though she has reformed. Finally overwhelmed with pain, she accepts. Now totally corrupted, Moondragon battles the Defenders until Andromeda, Interloper, Manslaughter, and Valkyrie sacrifice themselves to kill both her and the Dragon.

Heather's soul and consciousness manages to survive by sharing the mind of her cousin Pamela. By travelling to Titan in Moondragon's spacecraft, Moondragon is able to obtain an infant clone body created on Titan by the living computer Isaac.

Heather becomes jealous of her cousin and teleports her out of the ship to die. With the help of Cloud and Gargoyle (whose consciousness is being held within a gem Pam wears around her neck), she focuses her power near the sun and becomes a dragon. Cloud names Pam Sundragon. Sundragon, Gargoyle, and Demeityr stay on Titan while Moondragon returns to Earth.

=== Cosmic cohort ===
After Quasar is appointed Protector of the Universe, Moondragon insinuates herself into his life. Using the pseudonym H.D. Steckley she becomes an engineer and saleswoman for Vaughn Security Systems. She is convinced that in time Quasar will realize they are eminently qualified to form the universe's most cosmic coupling. Quasar, however, asserts that qualifications have nothing to do with feelings and rebuffs her. She persists for a time, but eventually gets the message and loses interest.

When Adam Warlock seeks people to help him safeguard the Infinity Gems, he chooses Moondragon to keep the Mind Gem—but only after erecting safeguards so Moondragon cannot exploit the gem's full power. Still, she agrees to join his team, the Infinity Watch. She is severely injured in a battle with Domitian. She is seen in a deep coma, though still able to communicate telepathically. All of the Infinity Gems leave their bearers and disappear.

Moondragon later becomes an associate of Genis-Vell (the third Captain Marvel), determined to help him control his cosmic awareness. During this time, she falls in love with Marlo Chandler, the wife of Rick Jones (whom Captain Marvel was bonded to). The two elope on a lesbian relationship to the reluctant understanding of Rick, with whom Marlo is having marital problems anyway. Sometime later, Marlo gets over her feelings for Moondragon and decides to return to Rick. Moondragon tells her she must have accidentally prodded her telepathically into the relationship, but this is a lie to make the break-up easier. In truth, Moondragon is heartbroken; she leaves shortly after with Phyla-Vell.

=== Annihilation ===
In the Annihilation miniseries, Moondragon and Phyla-Vell return. Phyla is seen going to Drax, telling him Moondragon has been kidnapped. Phyla tells Drax they were visiting the graves of Mar-Vell and Genis-Vell, when Thanos appears and kidnaps Moondragon, ripping off her ear and giving it to Phyla to give to Drax the Destroyer as a warning to stay away. While on Thanos' ship, Moondragon is infected with the Annihilation Wave parasites. She is forced to reveal Annihilus' plan to destroy all life in the universe. After learning of Annihulus' plan, Thanos causes her to regurgitate the parasites, wanting no further dealings with Annihulus. Thanos reveals that Galactus and Silver Surfer are powering the ship, but he plans on releasing them both so they can deal with Annihilus. However, Thanos' plan is cut short as Drax arrives to save his daughter, which he does by ripping Thanos' heart out.

However, Drax and Moondragon then manage to free the Silver Surfer, who in turn helps free Galactus, who Drax makes promise to ensure Moondragon's safety once he is freed. Galactus then teleports Drax and Moondragon off the ship. Moondragon loses track of Drax and is reunited with Phyla-Vell.

=== Annihilation: Conquest ===
In Quasar: Annihilation: Conquest, the love of Phyla and Moondragon is explored in depth. Due to the Phalanx taking over the Kree Empire, Phyla and Heather have to find the 'savior' that is shown to Phyla (Quasar) in a vision. They come across the Super-Adaptoid, who was absorbed by the Phalanx and set to prevent the women from finding the savior. During the battle, Moondragon has to change into a dragon, like the 'Dragon of the Moon' she had to fight most of her life. Moondragon cannot change back into her human form. Moondragon and Phyla follow a voice Phyla hears to find the savior for the Kree race, who is being attacked by the Phalanx. In the end, it turns out the voice belongs to the Supreme Intelligence of the Kree. It helps them find a cocoon, which is restoring Adam Warlock. The cocoon breaks open and Phyla and Moondragon ask Warlock to help them fight against the Phalanx. Shortly after, the Phalanx arrives, led by Ultron. Moondragon attempts to protect Phyla, and Ultron responds by plunging his arm into her chest. Heather dies shortly after in Phyla's arms.

Sometime later, Phyla and Drax are alerted by a prophet that Moondragon may be attempting to return. Mentor concludes that this may be the case, and so kills the two of them so that they may journey into the realm of the dead to retrieve her. Phyla saves Moondragon from the gullet of the Dragon of the Moon, and they return to life.

=== Guardians of the Galaxy ===
After her resurrection, Moondragon joins Phyla back at Knowhere and is accepted as an unofficial member of the Guardians of the Galaxy. She assists Cosmo and Mantis as part of the telepathic support team. Her resurrection leaves her mind more open than it had been before her death, so she is able to detect things before either Mantis or Cosmo do. Her increased sensitivity also leaves her more vulnerable to psychic manipulation by Starhawk, who has herself been released from confinement.

With Phyla's death at the hands of Adam Magus, Moondragon takes it upon herself to become a field agent for the Guardians of the Galaxy. However, she becomes host to an alien parasite originating in a parallel universe across the Fault, a time-space tear created by Black Bolt's Terrigen Bomb. Worse, she is biometrically cuffed by Cynosure, leader of the Luminals (an organization of heroic alien superhumans from the planet Xarth III), who intends to have the creature tried for killing one of her fellow Luminals. To make things worse, members of the Universal Church of Truth kidnap Moondragon and Cynosure, seeing the parasite as a god, whom they intend to birth. The Guardians and Luminals mount a joint rescue attempt and extract the two. With the help of Knowhere's medical staff, they are able to remove the organism from Moondragon. During these experiences, Moondragon has visions of a cocoon and Phyla being alive.

== Powers and abilities ==
Heather Douglas is a human who has accessed her full psionic potential through extreme training under the Titanian monks of Shao-Lom. She is also highly educated in Titanian science and is a master martial artist.

Moondragon primarily possesses tremendous telepathic abilities, which have enabled her to control the population of an entire planet to stop an ongoing war, while enslaving the thunder god Thor as her personal lover. She has demonstrated willpower and spiritual strength rivaling that of Thanos, and the Sorcerer Supreme Doctor Strange, pierced the psionic shields of the cosmic entity Galactus to enable communication, and when borrowing her abilities, Thanos almost manages to overwhelm the Devourer. Beyond communication and control of other minds, she can induce mental illusions, cause personality changes, and erase specific memories. She can also fire bolts of psionic energy as concussive blasts that can either stun an opponent or render an opponent brain dead. She is also a low-level telekinetic, an ability that lets her move and manipulate most physical matter by using only her thoughts, levitate herself and others, create shields of psychic force, and fire concussive psychokinetic energy blasts with sufficient strength to affect steel. She has demonstrated the ability to assume the form of her namesake, a fire-breathing dragon capable of surviving in outer space, traversing interstellar distances.

Moondragon has undergone significant training in the Titanian martial arts, as well as mental disciplines allowing her near-complete control over her body, including autonomic functions such as heartbeat, bleeding, and breathing, as well as awareness of pain. She has honed her strength, speed, stamina, agility and reflexes to her highest possible limits. She is a skilled martial artist and has beaten both Captain America and Mantis in hand-to-hand combat. She possesses a genius intellect and is familiar with various areas of advanced Titanian scientific disciplines, such as genetics and bionics, and has been able to upgrade the cyborgs Ramrod and Angar the Screamer. She restored Daredevil's eyesight. Additionally, she is also a highly skilled starship pilot.

== Reception ==
=== Critical response ===
George Chrysostomou of Den of Geek called Moondragon one of Marvel's "fan favorites," writing, "Heather Douglas is a fascinating figure and it's an absolute crime that she is yet to be introduced to the MCU." Deirdre Kaye of Scary Mommy called Moondragon a "role model" and a "truly heroic" female character. Jasmine Shanelle of The Mary Sue said they hoped to see Moondragon joining the Marvel Cinematic Universe. Mey Rude of Autostraddle stated Moondragon would be a "perfect addition" to the Guardians of the Galaxy film series. American actor Dave Bautista expressed interest in seeing Moondragon being portrayed in the MCU.

== Other versions ==
=== Age of Apocalypse ===
An alternate universe version of Heather Douglas from Earth-295 appears in "Age of Apocalypse". This version never accessed her full psionic potential and became a member of Quentin Quire's Overmind, a group of telepaths tasked with creating a "psychic pyramid scheme" and increasing Quire's skills, before being killed by the Shadow King.

=== Ultimate Marvel ===
An alternate universe version of Heather Douglas from Earth-1610 appears in Ultimate Extinction. This version, also known as "Heather Moon", is a contract killer who sports a dragon tattoo and was primarily active twenty years prior. Before she died, Douglas was hired by the Enclave, who created an army of clones from her DNA to help them stop Gah Lak Tus.

=== Marvel Zombies ===
A zombified alternate universe version of Moondragon from Earth-2149 appears in Marvel Zombies.

=== Marvel Adventures: Fantastic Four ===
An alternate universe version of Moondragon from Earth-20051 appears in Marvel Adventures: Fantastic Four #43. This version works for a carnival, where she runs a "Hall of Magic Mirrors".

== In other media ==
=== Television ===
- Heather Douglas / Moondragon makes a non-speaking appearance in the X-Men: The Animated Series episode "Beyond Good and Evil (Part 3)".
- Heather Douglas / Moondragon appears in the Mad episode "Captain America's Got Talent", voiced by Rachel Ramras.

=== Video games ===
- Heather Douglas / Moondragon appears in Marvel Avengers Alliance.
- Heather Douglas / Moondragon appears as a non-player character in Marvel Heroes, voiced by Mary Elizabeth McGlynn.
- Heather Douglas / Moondragon appears in Marvel Puzzle Quest.
- Heather Douglas / Moondragon appears as a playable character in Marvel Contest of Champions.
- Heather Douglas / Moondragon appears as a playable character in Lego Marvel's Avengers.
- Heather Douglas / Moondragon appears as a playable character in Marvel Strike Force.

=== Merchandise ===
- In 2020, Diamond Select Toys released a Heather Douglas / Moondragon action figure.
- In 2023, Hasbro released a Heather Douglas / Moondragon action figure as part of the Marvel Legends action figure line.
