= Iron Studios =

Brazilian maker of collectible statues

- Industry: Manufacturing
- Founded: 2012 - São Paulo, Brazil
- Headquarters: Sao Paulo, Brazil
- Products: Collectible Statues
- Subsidiaries: Iron Studios Workshop
- Website: www.ironstudios.com.br

Iron Studios is a Brazilian company based in São Paulo specializing in the manufacture of collectible statues. The company works with property licenses from Disney, Marvel Comics, DC Comics, and Star Wars. It produces models in 1/10th scale and larger models in 1/6th and 1/4th scale. The statues are made from Polystone, a high-density resin that offers resistance to heat and humidity. Real fabric or die-casting is used to produce other details.

It has stores in São Paulo and in Rio de Janeiro, where it sells products from other partner manufacturers, in addition to its own products.

== History ==
The history of Iron studios began with distributor PiziiToys and the Japanese company Kotobukiya. During the Brazilian toyfare ABRIN in 2009, they presented the first product of this partnership, a 1/6th scale sculpture of the Formula 1 driver Ayrton Senna at the moment of his victory in the 1993 Japanese GP. They also produced a second piece, on the same scale, the pose of Senna's victory at the 1991 Brazilian Grand Prix. The two statues show him in his red uniform, when he was on the McLaren team. In 2012 the third miniature of Ayrton Senna was launched, now in a black team Lotus Cars uniform. It was the first piece made by the newly created Iron Studios. On December 13, 2012, it announced a license agreement with Marvel Studios, for the production of statuettes in Brazil. The first announced product produced under this license was Iron Man Mark XLII, based on the movie Iron Man 3. In September 2015, the company obtained the licensing rights to some of the properties of Warner Bros, and invited the artist Ivan Reis to create conceptual art.

== Shops ==
On October 6, 2014, Iron Studios opened their first shop. It sells items from several manufacturers, other than those made by the company.

Between May and September 2016 Iron Studios set up a store in the Cidade Jardim shopping mall, in São Paulo, where it displayed an exhibition with some 150 of their pieces and those of other manufacturers. Some products went on sale.

Shopping Eldorado, in São Paulo, housed a branch of the shop in January 2016. After two years, the establishment closed in July 2018, for strategic reasons.

Its first store outside the State of São Paulo was inaugurated on August 19, 2016, at Shopping Nova América in the city of Rio de Janeiro.
