= Iron Man (comic book) =

Comic book series

- Iron Man #1 (May 1968); Cover art by Gene Colan and Mike Esposito
- Publisher: Marvel Comics

Iron Man

Series publication information
- Schedule: Monthly
- Format: Ongoing series
- Genre: Superhero
- Publication date: (vol. 1); May 1968 – September 1996 (vol. 2); November 1996 – November 1997 (vol. 3); February 1998 – December 2004 (vol. 4); January 2005 – January 2009 (Invincible Iron Man (vol. 1)); July 2008 – February 2011 (vol. 1 cont.); March 2011 – December 2012 (vol. 5); January 2013 – August 2014
- Number of issues: (vol. 1): 332 (#1–332) (vol. 2): 13 (#1–13) (vol. 3): 89 (#1–89) (vol. 4): 35 (#1–35) (vol. 1) cont.: 29 (#500–527 plus #500.1) (vol. 5): 29 (#1–28 plus #20.INH) (vol. 6): 25 (#1–25) (Infamous Iron Man (vol. 1)): 12 (#1–12) (Invincible Iron Man (vol. 1)): 33 (#1–33) (Invincible Iron Man (vol. 2)): 14 (#1–14) (Invincible Iron Man (vol. 3)): 14 (#1–14) (Invincible Iron Man (vol. 4)): 11 (#1–11) (Superior Iron Man): 9 (#1–9) (Tony Stark: Iron Man): 11 (#1–11)
- Main character(s): Iron Man

Creative team
- Writer(s): List: (vol. 1) Archie Goodwin (1–28, 88–90), Mimi Gold (29), Allyn Brodsky (30–34, 38), Gerry Conway (35–43, 91–97), Robert Kanigher (44), Gary Friderich (45–46, 60, 70), Roy Thomas (44, 47), Mike Friedrich (48–55, 58–75, 77, 79–81), Steve Gerber (56–58), Bill Mantlo (78, 86–87, 95–115, Annual #4), David Michelinie (116–157, 215–250, Annual #9–10), Dennis O'Neil (158, 160–208), Dennis Mallonee (209), Danny Fingeroth (202, 210–214, 253), Bob Layton (116–117, 119–120, 123, 125, 127–133, 135, 137–153, 215–250, 254, 256), Randall Frenz (257), John Byrne (258–277), Len Kaminski (278–318), Terry Kavanagh (319–332) (vol. 2) Jim Lee (1–5 (w/ Scott Lobdell), 7, 11–12), Jeph Loeb (7–12) (vol. 3) Kurt Busiek (1–25, Annual 1999), Roger Stern (14–25), Joe Quesada (26–35, Annual 2000, #1/2), Mike Grell (50–66), Frank Tieri (31–35, 37–49, Annual 2001), John Jackson Miller (73–85), Mark Scott Ricketts (86–89) (vol. 4) Warren Ellis (1–6), Charles Knauf (Invincible Iron Man (vol. 1)) Matt Fraction (vol. 5) Kieron Gillen
- Penciller(s): List: (vol. 1) Gene Colan, Johnny Craig, George Tuska, John Romita Jr., Bob Layton, Paul Ryan (vol. 2) Whilce Portacio, Ed Benes, Terry Shoemaker (vol. 3) Patrick Zircher, Sean Chen, Mike Grell (vol. 4) Adi Granov, Roberto De la Torre, Carlo Pagulayan (Invincible Iron Man (vol. 1)) Salvador Larroca (vol. 1) cont. Salvador Larroca (vol. 5) Greg Land
- Inker(s): List: (vol. 1) Bob Layton, Bob Wiacek (vol. 2) Scott Williams
- Colorist(s): List: (Invincible Iron Man (vol. 1), (vol. 1) cont. Frank D'Armata

Iron Man is an American comic book series featuring the character Iron Man and published by Marvel Comics. It debuted in 1968.

== Publication history ==
=== Volume 1 ===
The character made his first appearance in Tales of Suspense #39 (cover dated March 1963). After issue #99 (March 1968), the Tales of Suspense series was renamed Captain America. An Iron Man story appeared in the one-shot issue Iron Man and Sub-Mariner #1 (April 1968), before the "Golden Avenger" made his solo debut with Iron Man #1 (May 1968). The series' indicia gives its copyright title as Iron Man, while the trademarked cover logo of most issues is The Invincible Iron Man. Artist George Tuska began a decade-long association with the character with Iron Man #5 (Sept. 1968). Writer Mike Friedrich and artist Jim Starlin's brief collaboration on the Iron Man series introduced Mentor, Drax, Starfox, and Thanos in issue #55 (Feb. 1973). Friedrich scripted a metafictional story in which Iron Man visited the San Diego Comic Convention and met several Marvel Comics writers and artists. He then wrote the multi-issue "War of the Super-Villains" storyline which ran through 1975.

Writer David Michelinie, co-plotter/inker Bob Layton, and penciler John Romita Jr. became the creative team on the series with Iron Man #116 (Nov. 1978). Micheline and Layton established Tony Stark's alcoholism with the story "Demon in a Bottle", and introduced several supporting characters, including Stark's bodyguard/girlfriend Bethany Cabe; Stark's personal pilot and confidant James Rhodes, who later became the superhero War Machine; and rival industrialist Justin Hammer, who was revealed to be the employer of numerous high-tech armed enemies Iron Man had fought over the years. The duo also introduced the concept of Stark's specialized armors as he acquired a dangerous vendetta with Doctor Doom in the "Doomquest" storyline. The team worked together through #154 (Jan. 1982), with Michelinie writing three issues without Layton.

Following Michelinie and Layton's departures, Dennis O'Neil became the new writer of the series and had Stark relapse into alcoholism. Much of O'Neil's work on this plot thread was based on experiences with alcoholics he knew personally. Jim Rhodes replaced Stark as Iron Man in issue #169 (April 1983) and wore the armor for the next two years of stories. O'Neil returned Tony Stark to the Iron Man identity in issue #200 (Nov. 1985). Michelinie and Layton became the creative team once again in issue #215 (Feb. 1987). They crafted the "Armor Wars" storyline in issues #225 (Dec. 1987) to #231 (June 1988). John Byrne and John Romita Jr. produced a sequel titled "Armor Wars II" in issues #258-266 (July 1990-March 1991). The series had a crossover with the other Avengers-related titles as part of the "Operation: Galactic Storm" storyline. This initial series ended with issue #332 (Sept. 1996).

=== Volume 2 ===
Jim Lee, Scott Lobdell, and Jeph Loeb authored a second volume of the series as part of Heroes Reborn, which was drawn primarily by Whilce Portacio and Ryan Benjamin. This volume took place in a parallel universe and ran 13 issues (Nov. 1996 – Nov. 1997).

=== Volume 3 ===
Volume 3, whose first 25 issues were written by Kurt Busiek and then by Busiek and Roger Stern, ran 89 issues (Feb. 1998 - Dec. 2004). Later writers included Joe Quesada, Frank Tieri, Mike Grell, and John Jackson Miller. Issue #41 (June 2001) was additionally numbered #386, reflecting the start of dual numbering starting from the premiere issue of Volume 1 in 1968. The final issue was dual-numbered as #434.

=== Volume 4 ===
The next Iron Man series, Iron Man (vol. 4), debuted in early 2005 with the Warren Ellis-written storyline "Extremis", with artist Adi Granov. It ran 35 issues (Jan. 2005 - Jan. 2009), with the cover logo simply Iron Man, beginning with issue #13, and Iron Man: Director of S.H.I.E.L.D., beginning with issue #15. On the final three issues, the cover logo was overwritten by "War Machine, Weapon of S.H.I.E.L.D.", which led to the launch of a War Machine ongoing series.

The Invincible Iron Man (vol. 1), by writer Matt Fraction and artist Salvador Larroca, began with a premiere issue cover dated July 2008. For a seven-month overlap, Marvel published both Volume 4 and Volume 5 simultaneously. This Invincible volume jumped its numbering of issues from #33 to #500, cover-dated March 2011, to reflect the start from the premiere issue of Volume 1 in 1968.

=== Volume 5 ===
After the conclusion of The Invincible Iron Man (vol. 1), a new Iron Man series was started as a part of Marvel NOW!. Written by Kieron Gillen and illustrated by Greg Land, it began with issue #1 in November 2012, and ended with issue #28 in June 2014. The fifth volume consists of the "Iron Metropolitan" and "Rings of the Mandarin" story arcs. The volume also revealed that Tony was adopted, and that he had a disabled half-brother named Arno.

== Collected editions ==
=== Marvel Masterworks: Iron Man ===
Title	Material collected	Year	ISBN
Volume 1	Tales of Suspense #39-50	1992	978-0-7851-1186-3
Volume 2	Tales of Suspense #51-65	2004	978-0-7851-1771-1
Volume 3	Tales of Suspense #66-83, Tales to Astonish #82	2006	978-0-7851-2067-4
Volume 4	Tales of Suspense #84-99, Iron Man and Sub-Mariner #1, Iron Man #1	2007	978-0-7851-2678-2
Volume 5	Iron Man #2-13	2008	978-0-7851-3493-0
Volume 6	Iron Man #14-25	2009	978-0-7851-4129-7
Volume 7	Iron Man #26-38, Daredevil #73	2011	978-0-7851-5044-2
Volume 8	Iron Man #39-53	2013	978-0-7851-6623-8
Volume 9	Iron Man #54-67	2015	978-0-7851-9190-2
Volume 10	Iron Man #68-81	2017	978-1-302-90351-0
Volume 11	Iron Man #82-94, Annual #3-4	2018	978-1-302-91090-7
Volume 12	Iron Man #95-112	2019	978-1-302-91716-6
Volume 13	Iron Man #113-128, Marvel Premiere #44	2021	978-1-302-92232-0

=== Essential Iron Man ===
Title	Material collected	Year	ISBN
Volume 1	Tales of Suspense #39-72	2000	0-7851-3464-6
Volume 2	Tales of Suspense #73-99; Tales to Astonish #82; Iron Man and Sub-Mariner #1; Iron Man #1-11	2004	0-7851-1487-4
Volume 3	Iron Man #12-38; Daredevil #73	2008	0-7851-2764-X
Volume 4	Iron Man #39-61	2010	0-7851-4254-1
Volume 5	Iron Man #62-87, Iron Man Annual #3	2013	978-0785167334

=== Iron Man Epic Collections ===
Volume	Title	Material collected	Year	ISBN
1	The Golden Avenger	Tales of Suspense #39-72	OCT 2014	978-0785188636
2	By Force of Arms	Tales of Suspense #73-99; Iron Man and Sub-Mariner #1; Iron Man #1; material from Not Brand Echh #2	FEB 2017	978-1302900113
3	The Man Who Killed Tony Stark	Iron Man #2-24	APR 2019	978-1302916305
4	The Fury of Firebrand	Iron Man #25-46; Daredevil #73	AUG 2020	978-1302922078
10	The Enemy Within	Iron Man #158-177, Annual #5	SEP 2013	978-0785187875
11	Duel of Iron	Iron Man #178-195, Annual #6-7	APR 2016	978-0785195061
13	Stark Wars	Iron Man #215-232, Annual #9	JAN 2015	978-0785192909
14	Return of the Ghost	Iron Man #233-244; Marvel Fanfare #22-23, 44; Iron Man: Crash	MAR 2019	978-1302916299
15	Doom	Iron Man #245-257, Annual #10-11, material from Captain America Annual #9	FEB 2018	978-1302910136
16	War Games	Iron Man #258-277	MAR 2014	978-0785185505
17	War Machine	Iron Man #278-289, Annual #12-13; Darkhawk Annual #1; Avengers West Coast Annual #7; Marvel Holiday Special #2	APR 2020	978-1302923518
18	The Return Of Tony Stark	Iron Man #290-297, Annual #14, Marvel Super-Heroes #13, Iron Manual #1; material from Marvel Super-Heroes # 2, #8-9, #12, #14-15	NOV 2022	978-1302948191
20	In the Hands of Evil	Iron Man #310-318, War Machine #8-10; Force Works #6-7; Iron Man/Force Works Collectors' Preview #1; materiale from Marvel Comics Presents #169-172	AUG 2021	978-1302930776
21	The Crossing	Iron Man #319-324, Avengers #390-394, Avengers: The Crossing, Force Works #16-20 and War Machine #20-22.	MAY 2023	978-1302951597

=== Iron Man Omnibus ===
Title	Material collected	Year	ISBN
Iron Man Vol. 1	Tales of Suspense #39-83; Tales to Astonish #82	2008	978-0-7851-3055-0
Iron Man Vol. 2	Tales of Suspense #84-99; Iron Man and Sub-Mariner #1; Iron Man #1-25	2010	978-0-7851-4224-9
Iron Man by Michelinie, Layton & Romita Jr.	Iron Man #115-157	2013	978-0-7851-6712-9
Avengers: The Crossing	Iron Man #319-325, War Machine #20-25, Avengers #390-395, Force Works #16-22, Iron Man: Time Slide, Avengers: The Crossing, Age of Innocence: The Rebirth of Iron Man	2012	0785162038
Iron Man by Kurt Busiek & Sean Chen Omnibus	Iron Man (vol. 3) #1-25, Captain America (vol. 3) #8, Quicksilver #10, Avengers (vol. 3) #7, Iron Man/Captain America Annual 1998, Fantastic Four (vol. 3) #15, Iron Man Annual 1999, Thor (vol. 2) #17, Peter Parker, Spider-Man (vol. 2) #11, Juggernaut: The Eighth Day, Iron Man: The Iron Age #1-2	2013	978-0785168140
The Invincible Iron Man Vol. 1	The Invincible Iron Man (vol. 1) #1-19	2010	978-0-7851-4295-9
The Invincible Iron Man Vol. 2	The Invincible Iron Man (vol. 1) #20-33	2012	978-0-7851-4553-0
Marvel Platinum: The Definitive Iron Man (published by Marvel and Panini UK)	Tales of Suspense #39, Iron Man #99-100, 128, 131–133, 149–150, 200, 256, Iron Man (vol. 3) #30	2008	1-9052-3985-8

=== Iron Man ===
Title	Material collected	Year	ISBN
Iron Man: Demon in a Bottle	Iron Man #120-128	2006	0-7851-2043-2
The Many Armors of Iron Man	Iron Man #47, 142-144, 152-153, 200, 218	2008	0-7851-3029-2
Iron Man: Doomquest	Iron Man #149-150, 249-250	2008	0-7851-2834-4
Iron Man by Michelinie, Layton & Romita Jr. Omnibus	Iron Man #115-157	2013	978-0785167129
Iron Man: Iron Monger	Iron Man #193-200	2010	0-7851-4260-6
Iron Man: Armor Wars Prologue	Iron Man #215-224	2010	0-7851-4257-6
Iron Man: Armor Wars	Iron Man #225-232	2007	0-7851-2506-X
Atlantis Attacks	includes Iron Man Annual #10	2011	978-0-7851-4492-2
Acts of Vengeance	includes Iron Man #251-252	2011	0-7851-4464-1
Iron Man: Armor Wars II	Iron Man #258-266	2010	978-0-7851-4557-8
Iron Man: Armored Vengeance	Iron Man #258.1-258.4	2013	978-0-7851-5164-7
Iron Man: The Dragon Seed Saga	Iron Man #270-275	2008	0-7851-3131-0
Avengers: Galactic Storm Vol. 1	Iron Man #278, Captain America #398-399, Avengers West Coast #80-81, Quasar #32-33, Wonder Man #7-8, Avengers #345-346, Thor #445	2006	0-7851-2044-0
Avengers: Galactic Storm Vol. 2	Iron Man #279, Thor #446, Captain America #400-401, Avengers West Coast #82, Quasar #34-35, Wonder Man #9, Avengers #347, What If? #55-56	2006	0-7851-2045-9
Iron Man: War Machine	Iron Man #280-291	2008	0-7851-3132-9
Iron Man/War Machine: Hands of the Mandarin	Iron Man #310-312, War Machine #8-10, Force Works #8-7, material from Marvel Comics Presents #167-172	2013	978-0785184287
Avengers: The Crossing	Iron Man #319-325, War Machine #20-25, Avengers #390-395, Force Works #16-22, Iron Man: Time Slide, Avengers: The Crossing, Age of Innocence: The Rebirth of Iron Man	2012	0-7851-6203-8
Avengers/Iron Man: First Sign	Iron Man #326-331, Captain America #449, Thor #496, Avengers #396-400	2013	0-7851-8496-1
X-Men: The Complete Onslaught Epic - Book Three	Iron Man #332, Incredible Hulk (vol. 2) #445, Avengers #402, Punisher #11, X-Man #19, Amazing Spider-Man #415, Green Goblin #12, Spider-Man #72, Fantastic Four #416, Wolverine #105	2008	0-7851-2825-5

=== Heroes Reborn/Heroes Return ===
Heroes Reborn: Iron Man	Iron Man (vol. 2) #1-12	2006	0-7851-2338-5
Iron Man by Kurt Busiek & Sean Chen Omnibus	Iron Man (vol. 3) #1-25, Captain America (vol. 3) #8, Quicksilver #10, Avengers (vol. 3) #7, Iron Man/Captain America Annual 1998, Fantastic Four (vol. 3) #15, Iron Man Annual 1999, Thor (vol. 2) #17, Peter Parker: Spider-Man (vol. 2) #11, 'Juggernaut: The Eighth Day, Iron Man: The Iron Age #1-2	2013	978-0785168140
Iron Man: Deadly Solutions	Iron Man (vol. 3) #1-7	2010	0-7851-4258-4
Iron Man: Revenge of the Mandarin	Iron Man (vol. 3) #8-15, Iron Man/Captain America Annual 1998, Fantastic Four (vol. 3) #15	2012	978-0785162605
Iron Man: The Mask in the Iron Man	Iron Man (vol. 3) #26-30	2001	0-7851-0776-2
Iron Man by Joe Quesada	Iron Man (vol. 3) #26-32, 1/2, Annual 2000	2013	978-0785167365
Iron Man by Mike Grell - The Complete Collection	Iron Man (vol. 3) #50-69	2021	978-1302936990
Avengers: Standoff	Iron Man (vol. 3) #64, Avengers (vol. 3) #62-64, Thor (vol. 2) #58	2010	0-7851-4467-6
Avengers Disassembled: Iron Man	Iron Man (vol. 3) #84-89	2007	0-7851-1653-2

=== Iron Man (vol. 4)/Invincible Iron Man (vol. 1) ===
Iron Man: Extremis	Iron Man (vol. 4) #1-6	2007	0-7851-2258-3
Iron Man: Execute Program	Iron Man (vol. 4) #7-12	2007	0-7851-1671-0
Civil War: Iron Man	Iron Man (vol. 4) #13-14, Iron Man/Captain America Special and Civil War: The Confession Special	2007	0-7851-2314-8
Iron Man: Director of S.H.I.E.L.D.	Iron Man (vol. 4) #15-18, Strange Tales #135 and Iron Man #129	2007	0-7851-2299-0
Hulk: World War Hulk - X-Men	Iron Man (vol. 4) #19-20, plus additional "World War Hulk" crossover titles	2008	0-7851-2888-3
Iron Man: Haunted	Iron Man (vol. 4) #21-28 and Director of S.H.I.E.L.D. Annual #1	2008	0-7851-2557-4
Iron Man: With Iron Hands	Iron Man (vol. 4) #29-32 and Iron Man (vol. 3) #36	2009	0-7851-2298-2
Secret Invasion: War Machine	Iron Man (vol. 4) #33-35 and Iron Man #144	2009	0-7851-3455-7
Invincible Iron Man: The Five Nightmares	Invincible Iron Man (vol. 1) #1-7	2009	0-7851-3412-3
Invincible Iron Man: Worlds Most Wanted Book One	Invincible Iron Man (vol. 1) #8-13	2009	0-7851-3413-1
Invincible Iron Man: Worlds Most Wanted Book Two	Invincible Iron Man (vol. 1) #14-19	2010	0-7851-3685-1
Invincible Iron Man: Stark Disassembled	Invincible Iron Man (vol. 1) #20-24	2010	0-7851-4554-0
Invincible Iron Man: Stark Resilient Book One	Invincible Iron Man (vol. 1) #25-28	2010	978-0-7851-4555-4
Invincible Iron Man: Stark Resilient Book Two	Invincible Iron Man (vol. 1) #29-33	2011	0-7851-4834-5
Invincible Iron Man: My Monsters	Invincible Iron Man #500, 500.1, Annual #1 and material from #503	2011	0-7851-4836-1
Invincible Iron Man: The Unfixable	Invincible Iron Man #501-502, material from #503, Free Comic Book Day 2010: Iron Man/Thor, and Rescue #1	2011	0-7851-5322-5
Invincible Iron Man: Fear Itself	Invincible Iron Man #504-509 and Fear Itself: Iron Man #7.3	2012	0-7851-5773-5
Invincible Iron Man: Demon	Invincible Iron Man #510-515	2012	0-7851-6046-9
Invincible Iron Man: Long Way Down	Invincible Iron Man #516-520	2013	978-0785160496
Invincible Iron Man: The Future	Invincible Iron Man #521-527	2013	978-0785165224

=== Marvel NOW! ===
Iron Man: Believe	Iron Man (vol. 5) #1-5	2013	0-7851-6833-8
Iron Man: The Secret Origin of Tony Stark Book 1	Iron Man (vol. 5) #6-11	2013	978-0785168348
Iron Man: The Secret Origin of Tony Stark Book 2	Iron Man (vol. 5) #12-17	2013	978-0785168355
Iron Man: Iron Metropolitan	Iron Man (vol. 5) #18-20, 20.INH, 21-22	2014	978-0785189428
Iron Man: Fatal Frontier	Fatal Frontier Infinite Comic #1-13, Annual #1	2014	978-0785184560
Iron Man: Rings of the Mandarin	Iron Man (vol. 5) #23-28	September 2014	978-0785154822
Original Sin: Hulk vs. Iron Man	Original Sin: Hulk vs. Iron Man #1-4	Nov 2014	978-0785191568
Uncanny X-Men / Iron Man / Nova: No End in Sight	Uncanny X-Men Special #1, Iron Man Special #1, Nova Special #1	Nov 2014	978-0785191056
Superior Iron Man: Infamous	Superior Iron Man #1-5	May 2015	978-0785193777
Superior Iron Man: Stark Contrast	Superior Iron Man #6-9	September 2015	978-0785193784
Armor Wars: Warzones!	Secret Wars: Warzones! Armor Wars	January 2016	978-0785198642
Invincible Iron Man: Reboot	Invincible Iron Man (vol. 3) #1-5	April 2016	978-0785195207
Invincible Iron Man: The War Machines	Invincible Iron Man (vol. 3) #6-11	September 2016	978-0785195214
Invincible Iron Man: Civil War II	Invincible Iron Man (vol. 3) #12-14	February 2017	978-1302903206
International Iron Man	International Iron Man #1-7	August 2017	978-0785199793
Infamous Iron Man Vol. 1	Infamous Iron Man #1-6	June 2017	978-1302906245
Infamous Iron Man Vol. 2: The Absolution of Doom	Infamous Iron Man #7-12	December 2017	978-1302906252
Invincible Iron Man: Ironheart Vol. 1 - Riri Williams	Invincible Iron Man (vol. 4) #1-5	July 2017	978-1302906719
Invincible Iron Man: Ironheart Vol. 2 - Choices	Invincible Iron Man (vol. 4) #6-11	January 2018	978-1302906733
Invincible Iron Man: The Search for Tony Stark	Iron Man #593-600	July 2018	978-1302910426

=== Tony Stark: Iron Man ===
Title	Material Collected	Year	ISBN
Tony Stark: Iron Man Vol. 1: Self-Made Man	Tony Stark: Iron Man #1-5	2019	978-1-302-91272-7
Tony Stark: Iron Man Vol. 2: Stark Realities	Tony Stark: Iron Man #6-11	2019	978-1-302-91273-4
Tony Stark: Iron Man Vol. 3: War of the Realms	Tony Stark: Iron Man #12-14 and Iron Man (Vol. 3) #25	2019	978-1-302-91443-1

=== Miniseries ===
Iron Man: War of the Iron Men	Iron Man: Legacy #1-5	2010	0-7851-4729-2
Iron Man: Industrial Revolution	Iron Man: Legacy #6-11	2011	0-7851-4731-4
Iron Age	Iron Age: Alpha, Iron Age #1-3, Iron Age: Omega	Nov. 2011	978-0785152699
Iron Man: The Inevitable	Iron Man: The Inevitable #1-6	2006	0-7851-2084-X
Iron Man: Hypervelocity	Iron Man: Hypervelocity #1-6	2007	0-7851-2083-1
Iron Man: Enter the Mandarin	Iron Man: Enter the Mandarin #1-6	2008	0-7851-2622-8

== See also ==
- Infamous Iron Man
