= List of Marvel Comics characters: U =

== Ullr ==
Ullr is a character appearing in American comics books published by Marvel Comics. He is loosely based on Ullr of Norse mythology.

== Ultimate Nullifier ==
Ultimate Nullifier is the name of several characters appearing in American comic books published by Marvel Comics. They have no connection with the Ultimate Nullifier device.

=== Mayne ===
Mayne is a member of the Teen Brigade who possesses technopathy and wields ray guns resembling the Ultimate Nullifier that can negate superpowers.

=== Construct ===
This Ultimate Nullifier is a construct that was created from Loki's guilt.

=== Ultimate Universe ===
An Earth-6160 character inspired by the Ultimate Nullfier appears as a member of the Guardians of the Galaxy.

== Ultimaton ==
- Further reading: Ultimaton at the Comic Book DB (archived from the original); Ultimaton at the Grand Comics Database

Ultimaton, also known as Weapon XV, is a living weapon created by the anti-mutant supersoldier program Weapon Plus under orders of Sublime. The character was created by Grant Morrison and Chris Bachalo, first appeared in New X-Men #143 (August 2003).

Ultimaton and former experiment Fantomex are identical siblings. Created as part of Weapon Plus's Super-Sentinels by employing artificial evolution and nanosentinel technology, they are labeled as exact copies of each other, an anomaly that was fixed by picking Ultimaton for further development inside of the World. Fantomex was discarded to the real world.

Ultimaton escapes from the Weapon Plus facilities, fights the X-Men and is destroyed. He is later resurrected in the World facility and tasked by Fantomex to guard Evan Sabahnur, a young clone of Apocalypse. After Evan joins the Jean Grey School for Higher Learning, Ultimaton joins Wolverine's black ops X-Force. After Fantomex is killed by the Brotherhood of Mutants, Ultimaton reverts to its original anti-mutant functions and detonates.

Ultimaton is revived in the World and under Fantomex's control once more, but still obedient to his role as caretaker of the facility, protecting its assets from intruders.

== Ultimus ==
- First appearance: Thor #209 (March 1973)
- Created by: Gerry Conway, John Buscema
- Species: Kree Eternal
- Teams: Starforce
- Abilities: Superhuman strength, agility, stamina and durability; Energy manipulation; Flight; Homing instinct; Telepathic immunity
- Aliases: Demon Druid
- Further reading: Ultimus at the Comic Book DB (archived from the original); Ultimus at the Grand Comics Database

Ultimus (Ard-Con) was created by Gerry Conway and John Buscema, making his debut in Thor #209 as Demon Druid. The character first appeared as Ultimus in Wonder Man #7.

Ard-Con is a member of the Kree Eternal sub-race created by the Celestials. He with the other Kree Eternals travelled through space, eventually coming across Earth 4000 years ago. The Celts of Earth mistook the Kree Eternals as deities and soon all Kree Eternals left Earth except Ard-Con who stayed on Earth for a millennium, but was then imprisoned by the Deviant Tantalus. He also encountered Odin once, claiming that his name brought back memories, but also thought that Odin had died. He was then accidentally freed by Thor when the latter used Mjölnir to turn into Donald Blake. Once free, he started wreaking havoc across the streets and knocked Thor unconscious. He was then apprehended by the British Army and Thor again, but stopped fighting when Thor realized that Ard-Con was trying to reach a portal at Stonehenge to leave Earth. After that, Ard-Con successfully departed Earth.

Ard-Con is unable to find his people, so he returns to Earth via a portal created by two tourists and the hero Meggan, who were under the influence of the Eternal. Shadowcat intervenes and frees Meggan along with tourists. Ard-Con then breaks into Darkmoor Nuclear Research Facility, where he recreates a nuclear facsimile to use it at Stonehenge and finally reunite with his people. However, Excalibur intervenes, while Kitty opens a portal to Ard-Con's people and apologizes to him. After returning home, Ard-Con learns that he is the last surviving Kree Eternal. Ultimus joins Starforce at the Supreme Intelligence's insistence.

=== Ultimus in other media ===
Ultimus appears in Marvel Strike Force.

== Ultra Living Brain ==
Ultra Living Brain is a character appearing in American comic books published by Marvel Comics. Created by writer Zeb Wells and artists John Romita Jr. and Ed McGuinness, it first appeared in The Amazing Spider-Man (vol. 6) #6 (July 2022).

It is a successor to the Living Brain created by Steven Petty to deduce Spider-Man's secret identity. After accidentally killing Petty, the Ultra Living Brain creates a robotic avatar based on him to interact with the world due to being immobile.

== Ultragirl ==
- Further reading: Ultra Girl at the Comic Book DB (archived from the original)

Ultragirl (Suzanna Sherman, or Tsu-Zana) is an American comic book superhero created by Barbara Kesel and Leonard Kirk, who first appeared in Ultragirl #1 (November 1996). As one critic described, "She was a clever … modern riff on Supergirl, basically 'What would Supergirl be like if she debuted in the mid-1990s in the Marvel Universe?'"

Suzy Sherman is an aspiring model who, over the course of a few days, grows several inches, develops the physique of a bodybuilder, and acquires superpowers. She discovers that she is a mutant Kree warrior, born Tsu-Zana. Her powers include flight, super-strength, multi-spectral vision, and a healing factor.

Ultragirl is a member of Captain America's Secret Avengers during the superhero civil war. She later joins the superhero training program the Initiative and enters a romantic relationship with Justice. She and Thor Girl become the Initiative heroes assigned to protect Georgia, with Carol Danvers/Ms. Marvel having been so impressed by Ultragirl's development that she bequeaths Ultragirl her former Ms. Marvel costume.

Ultragirl is forced to give up the Ms. Marvel costume after an attorney informs her that its intellectual property rights are owned by the Avengers. After saving Justice from Ragnarok, Ultragirl leaves the Initiative to join Justice's revamped New Warriors team.

== Unspoken ==
Unspoken

Publication information
- Publisher: Marvel Comics
- First appearance: The Mighty Avengers #27 (September 2009)
- Created by: Dan Slott; Khoi Pham; Christos Gage

In-story information
- Species: Inhuman
- Place of origin: Attilan
- Abilities: Living Terrigenesis

The Unspoken is a supervillain appearing in American comic books published by Marvel Comics. He is the cousin of Blackagar Boltagon (Black Bolt), and was once the king of the Inhumans before he was forced into exile. The Unspoken first appeared in The Mighty Avengers #27 and was created by Dan Slott, Khoi Pham, and Christos Gage.

Originally, the Unspoken was a just ruler to the Inhumans. However, fearful that it would corrupt his people, he stole the Slave Engine, his people's greatest weapon, along with the Xerogen Crystals it utilized and buried them somewhere in Tibet. After refusing to reveal the Slave Engine's location, he was challenged to a duel by the heir to the throne, a young Blackagar Boltagon. Despite being the strongest of the Inhumans, moving the Slave Engine had weakened the King which led to his defeat at the hands of Blackagar and his friends. His final stipulation was that his deeds be remembered, but Black Bolt had a crueler fate in mind: the King, his deeds, and the Slave Engine itself, were written out of Inhuman history. From that day on, he would be remembered only as a Bogeyman to frighten small children, his name left "unspoken".

The Unspoken is recovered by the Alpha Primitives, who care for their fallen king. Realizing his mistake, the Unspoken plots to return and reclaim his throne, cultivating the Xerogen Crystals, only for Attilan to rise into the sky. Cheated of his redemption and later learning of the silent war between the Inhumans and United States of America, the Unspoken decides to change his plans and unearth the Slave Engine using it to conquer Earth, by transforming all humans into Alpha Primitives. The Unspoken is defeated when the chronal ray on board the Slave Engine that accelerated the growth of the Xerogen crystals is used against him, aging him to the point where he is too weak to carry on fighting.

The Unspoken is the living embodiment of Terrigenesis itself. He is capable of altering his form in any way he desires, and can give himself a wide number of abilities, such as mass manipulation and energy construct manifestation. To maintain his powers, he needs to absorb Terrigen Crystals.

== Unuscione ==
- Further reading: Unuscione at the Comic Book DB (archived from the original); Unuscione at the Grand Comics Database

Carmella Unuscione is an Italian supervillain. In the majority of her appearances she has been a member of Magneto's Acolytes. The character, created by Scott Lobdell and Brandon Peterson, first appeared in The Uncanny X-Men #298 (March 1993). She is a mutant with the ability to generate a tangible field of psionic energy around herself (referred to in many of her appearances as her "psionic exoskeleton") that she can manipulate to a limited degree, forming large clawed hands with which to grip or strike with superhuman force, or surrounding others to protect them as well. Her exoskeleton is highly resistant to damage, being able to withstand the heat and pressure of reentry into Earth's atmosphere and blows from beings as strong as the X-Man Colossus. Through this field Unuscione can generate disruptive bio-energy charges that cause extreme pain and temporary paralysis in living beings. Unuscione is generally portrayed as one of the more fanatical and violent members of the Acolytes, often coming into conflict with the X-Men.

=== Unuscione in other media ===
Unuscione makes non-speaking appearances in X-Men: The Animated Series as a member of Magneto's Acolytes.

== Uqesh the Bridge ==
Uqesh the Bridge is a character appearing in American comic books published by Marvel Comics. The character was created by writer Simon Spurrier and artist Jan Bazaldua, and first appeared in Legion of X #1 (June 2022).

Uqesh is an Omega-level mutant from Arakko with the ability to summon gods. Six hundred years prior, Uqesh served in the Great Ring of Arakko, holding the Seat of Law. Amidst a period of civil unrest, Uqesh attempted to use his powers to have the gods aid Arakko. When his plan failed, Uqesh was challenged and defeated by Ora Serrata, who took his seat in the Great Ring. After Uqesh's defeat, he was beheaded, with his still-living head being kept in storage. In the present, Uqesh is used by the Arakkii to summon gods, who are forced to prove their worth or else be killed. However, Ora is convinced to change Arakko's laws, ending the Godlaw that allowed for Arakko's persecution of gods. Without the Godlaw, Ora sees no more use for Uqesh and kills him.

== Uranos ==
- Further reading: Uranos at the Comic Book DB (archived from the original); Uranos at the Grand Comics Database

Uranos is a member of the race known as the Eternals in the Marvel Universe. The character, created by Jim Starlin, first appeared in Captain Marvel #29 (November 1973). The character also appears in back-up stories in What If? #24 ("The First Eternals", December 1980), and 26-27 ("Untold Tales Of The Marvel Universe: Outpost On Uranus", April–July 1981).

Uranos is Kronos's brother and was banished from Earth along with his followers, after losing a civil war against Kronos. He succeeds in re-materializing and discovers a Kree base on the planet Uranus. After destroying Sentry 213 who was stationed there, Uranos uses the weapons there in an attempt to return to Earth and gain revenge on Kronos. Uranos encounters a Kree Armada. After the ship is destroyed, Uranos and the survivors with him resettle on Titan and die during another civil war.

The Uranos who was on Titan is revealed to have been a clone, with the real Uranos being imprisoned in the Exclusion. Uranos' grandnephew Thanos visited him and received an imprint key that would grant him access to his armories.

In the storyline "A.X.E.: Judgment Day", Druig goes to the Exclusion to enlist Uranos' help in dealing with the mutant threat. When the X-Men's telepaths breach the Uni-Mind, Druig is forced to release Uranos, who is defeated by Magneto and Storm and imprisoned alongside Druig.

== Ev Teel Urizen ==
Ev Teel Urizen is a character appearing in American comic books published by Marvel Comics. It was created by writer Mike Carey. Ev Teel Urizen first appeared in X-Men (vol. 2) #197 (May 2007). Urizen is a mummudrai, an energy-based mental parasite. Urizen existed harmlessly dormant in its host, the Shi'ar Ul'var Urizen, until Shi'ar scientists extracted it to use as the basis for a superweapon, Hecatomb, designed to consume the minds of a planet's entire population. The Shi'ar lost control of Hecatomb and it pursued Urizen, which it identified as part of itself. Detecting Charles Xavier'd psychic energy on Earth, Urizen traveled through space for centuries to reach him, followed by Hecatomb. On Earth, Urizen entered the mind of the comatose Regan Wyngarde, and remained with her after she regained consciousness and helped defeat the Children of the Vault. Still hidden, Urizen risked exposure to protect Regan during a subsequent conflict with the villain Pandemic. Regan eventually detected Urizen and expelled it from her mind. Urizen offered to bond with the powerful mutant Cable to fight Hecatomb. Suspicious of Urizen's motives, Cable initially refused; he reluctantly agreed only after Hecatomb attacked Earth and proved as powerful as Urizen had warned. Hecatomb was able to separate Urizen from Cable, but not before they used their combined powers to wake the comatose Rogue. Urizen spent its last moments in terror as Hecatomb consumed it. Rogue then arrived and, her powers augmented by Pandemic's "Strain 88" virus, absorbed the 8 billion consciousnesses Hecatomb contained, destroying it.

== Utgard-Loki ==
- Further reading: Utgard-Loki at the Comic Book DB (archived from the original); Utgard-Loki at the Grand Comics Database

Utgard-Loki is a Frost Giant in the Marvel Universe, based on the Norse mythological character of the same name. The character, created by Roy Thomas and John Buscema, first appeared in Thor #272 (June 1978).

Utgard-Loki is the monarch of the Frost Giants of Jotunheim, who are enemies of the Asgardian gods.
