= Captain Marvel (Mar-Vell) =

Marvel Comics superhero

- Captain Marvel as depicted in Captain Marvel #54 (January 1978). Art by Dave Cockrum (pencils), Terry Austin (inks), and Irene Vertanoff (colors).

Publication information
- Publisher: Marvel Comics
- First appearance: Marvel Super-Heroes #12 (December 1967)
- Created by: Stan Lee; Gene Colan

In-story information
- Full name: Mar-Vell
- Species: Kree mutate
- Team affiliations: Defenders; Avengers; Legion of the Unliving
- Notable aliases: Dr. Walter Lawson
- Abilities: Superhuman strength, speed, agility, durability, reflexes, and endurance; Solar energy absorption, manipulation, and projection; Regenerative healing factor; Cosmic Awareness; Flight; Use of Nega-bands

Captain Marvel (real name: Mar-Vell; Earth alias Walter Lawson) is a character appearing in American comic books published by Marvel Comics. Created by writer-editor Stan Lee and designed by artist Gene Colan, the character first appeared in Marvel Super-Heroes #12 (December 1967). He is the first character to use the moniker Captain Marvel in the Marvel Universe.

The character debuted during the Silver Age of comic books and made many subsequent appearances, including a self-titled series and the second volume of the Marvel Spotlight series until his death in 1982, which has since remained largely permanent within mainstream continuity and most other media, with Carol Danvers (the former Ms. Marvel) becoming the primarily featured Captain Marvel in the modern age.

== Publication history ==
From 1940 to 1953, Fawcett Comics published comics featuring their popular character Captain Marvel, and thus held the trademark to the name "Captain Marvel". Fawcett ceased publishing the comics in 1953 due to a 1951 copyright infringement suit from DC Comics, and their trademark ostensibly lapsed. Taking advantage of this situation, Marvel debuted its new Captain Marvel character in 1967 and quickly trademarked the name. Marvel was not the first company to try to capitalize on Fawcett's lapsed trademark; in 1966 the small publisher M. F. Enterprises released a short-lived Captain Marvel series. Due to the title containing its company name, Marvel had convinced M.F. Enterprises to cease their Captain Marvel series after five issues, paying M.F. a settlement of $4,500.

Marvel's character debuted as the lead feature in Marvel Super-Heroes #12 (December 1967), written by Stan Lee and illustrated by Gene Colan. Although usually credited as co-creator, Colan had no involvement with Captain Marvel's conception, and in fact voiced an intense dislike for the character and especially his original white-and-green costume: "It was awful – just an imitation of any of the other costumed characters I'd ever done."

Shortly thereafter, Captain Marvel was given his own series, commencing with Captain Marvel #1 (May 1968). These appearances established Captain Marvel, or "Mar-Vell", as an alien of the Kree race who had come to earth as a spy before coming to identify with his human neighbors. The series failed to register with readers, and was revamped by writer-artist team Roy Thomas and Gil Kane in issue #17 (October 1969). The character was given a new uniform, designed by Kane and colorist Michelle Robinson, and greater abilities. An added plot feature was the introduction of sidekick Rick Jones. Jones and Marvel "shared molecules", allowing only one to exist in the real world at a time. Thomas stated that the intent of the change was to create a more science-fiction oriented update that was reminiscent of Fawcett Comics's original Captain Marvel, who similarly had an alter-ego that could not co-exist with the superhero.

The change, however, was not successful, and the series was published only intermittently from 1969. It was initially canceled with issue #21 (August 1970), though the character appeared in the Kree–Skrull War storyline in Avengers #89 – 97 (June 1971 – March 1972), also written by Thomas. The Captain Marvel series recommenced with issue #22 (September 1972). Plotter and artist Jim Starlin decided to revamp the character with issue #25 (March 1973). Comics historian Les Daniels noted that "In a brief stint with Marvel, which included work on two characters [Captain Marvel and Adam Warlock] that had previously never quite made their mark, Starlin managed to build a considerable cult following."

A spin-off series, Ms. Marvel, was launched in 1977, but sales remained modest, and the series was published on only a bimonthly basis until it was ultimately canceled in 1979. The continued publication, however, kept the trademark current. This had the effect of requiring DC Comics, which in the meantime licensed the original Fawcett Captain Marvel for publication, to print its new comics under the trademark Shazam!. Comics historian Don Markstein stated, "Marvel didn't seem to quite know what to do with him—but they did put his comic out every other month through most of the 1970s, if only to maintain their trademark on his name."

When Captain Marvel was cancelled with issue #62 (May 1979), there were five as-yet unpublished issues already complete or near-complete. The series Marvel Spotlight was revived for the express purpose of publishing them (specifically, in issues #1–4 and 8). Starlin wrote Mar-Vell's death in Marvel's first graphic novel, The Death of Captain Marvel (1982).

Following the character's death, Marvel published several comics with new characters taking up the "Captain Marvel" moniker, thereby maintaining their trademark on the name. The character returned, although not in a living capacity, in storylines in Silver Surfer vol. 3 #63 (March 1992) and Captain Marvel vol. 5, #5 (March 2003). The limited series Captain Marvel vol. 6, #1–5 (January–June 2008) was released as part of the "Secret Invasion" storyline and saw the Skrull Khn'nr impersonate Mar-Vell.

Mar-Vell was one of the featured characters in the 2011 three-issue limited series Chaos War: Dead Avengers.

== Fictional character biography ==
=== 1960s ===
Mar-Vell on the cover of Captain Marvel #1 (May 1968) Art by Gene Colan.

After the Kree's first encounter with humans, Captain Mar-Vell is sent to spy on Earth and decide if it is a threat to the Kree empire. He adopts the identity of recently deceased scientist Walter Lawson, but occasionally dons his Kree military uniform to protect the people he is observing. The first time he does this, people hear him incorrectly pronounce his name as "Captain Marvel". His job is made difficult by his jealous commanding officer, Colonel Yon-Rogg, his growing affection for humanity, and his fake identity's criminal past.

After aiding humanity several times, Mar-Vell is found guilty of treason against the Kree Empire and sentenced to death by firing squad. Mar-Vell escapes in a stolen rocket, but becomes lost in space. After drifting for 112 days, he is weak and on the verge of madness. He is manipulated by Ronan the Accuser and Kree Minister Zarek into helping them overthrow the Supreme Intelligence. To better help them, Mar-Vell is given a new costume and enhanced abilities. After the conspiracy is foiled, Mar-Vell tries to return to Earth. On the way, he is hit by a blast of radiation and trapped in the Negative Zone.

The Supreme Intelligence enables Mar-Vell to telepathically contact Rick Jones, which he uses to lead Jones to a set of "nega-bands" at an abandoned Kree base. When Jones puts on the bands and strikes them together, he trades places with Mar-Vell and is encased in a protective aura in the Negative Zone. The pair discover they are able to maintain telepathic contact. Using this method, Mar-Vell can remain in the positive universe for a period of three hours.

=== 1970s ===
Captain Marvel #29 (November 1973). Art by Jim Starlin.

After brief encounters with the villain Scorpio and the Hulk, Jones uses Mister Fantastic's portal to the Negative Zone to free Mar-Vell, who becomes embroiled in the Kree–Skrull War. As a result of the war, Jones is left near death and Mar-Vell re-merges with Jones to save his life.

Mar-Vell's consciousness begins to resurface weeks later as Jones's body becomes unable to house both of their life energy. Photon ray treatments by Professor Savannah stabilizes the situation and brings Mar-Vell's body and consciousness to the surface. After battling the atomic-powered Megaton, Mar-Vell is trapped in the Negative Zone once again until released by Jones via the nega-bands.

Mar-Vell aids the Avengers against the Grim Reaper and the Space Phantom. Mar-Vell allies with Mentor and Eros against the death worshipper Thanos and his forces in a war for the Cosmic Cube. Seeing the magnitude of the threat, the cosmic entity Kronos aids them by creating Drax the Destroyer, whose sole purpose is to kill Thanos. Another cosmic being, Eon, transforms Mar-Vell into the "Protector of the Universe". This provides the hero with new abilities, including "cosmic awareness". Thanos gains the Cube and uses it to make himself omnipotent. Thanos' spirit leaves his body, and Mar-Vell uses the opportunity to shatter the Cube, which was still in Thanos' hand. This undoes Thanos's actions.

Mar-Vell teams with Spider-Man to battle the Basilisk and later encounters a new villain named Nitro. While defusing a bomb placed by Nitro, Mar-Vell is exposed to the nerve gas Compound 13, but recovers after being given an antidote. During this time, Mar-Vell has an encounter with Living Laser. Mar-Vell investigates Nitro's allies, who are revealed to be the Kree "Lunatic Legion", leading to a series of protracted battles and the eventual trial of the cosmic entity Uatu the Watcher for constant involvement in Earth affairs. After ending the threat and aiding Uatu, Mar-Vell briefly separates from Jones and has an encounter with a space parasite that assumes the form of former lover Una.

Mar-Vell travels to the Kree homeworld of Hala, and through a protracted series of events that almost kills Rick Jones, frees himself from the manipulation of the Supreme Intelligence. During this period, Mar-Vell also encounters the cosmic entity the Stranger. Returning to Earth, Mar-Vell encounters stranded Kree scientists who attempt to retrieve an inactive Kree Sentry located on the S.H.I.E.L.D. Helicarrier. This proves unsuccessful when the Sentry activates but fails to follow direction, going on a rampage. A new villain called the Cheetah attempts to manipulate the Sentry, although both are eventually defeated by Mar-Vell. The hero locates the Kree scientists, and briefly battles Ronan the Accuser, who was left with the mind of a child after a previous encounter.

Rick Jones is visiting Avengers Mansion when the Super-Adaptoid attacks. During a battle with the Avengers, Jones trades places with Mar-Vell, with the Super-Adaptoid eventually mimicking Mar-Vell's Nega-Bands. Mar-Vell then brings the Super-Adaptoid's bands together, exiling it to the Negative Zone and freeing Jones. Mar-Vell bids Jones farewell and encounters Mercurio the 4-D Man, who tricks Mar-Vell into returning to his home dimension, hoping to coerce the hero into building the Omni-Wave Projector. Mar-Vell, however, defeats Mercurio and returns to Earth.

Mar-Vell continues to have dealings with the Kree, preventing scientist Doctor Minerva from killing Rick Jones and battling High Council member Phae-Dor before travelling to Hala and, with King of the Inhumans Black Bolt as his ally, preventing the "War of the Three Galaxies" by exposing a Skrull infiltrator. After another encounter with Nitro, Mar-Vell briefly attempts to adopt the Walter Lawson identity once again and works at an observatory. This plan is abandoned when forced to become Mar-Vell to stop an energy vampire named Deathgrip. After an encounter with Thor, Mar-Vell is forced to fight off Drax, who has been driven insane due to being unable to fulfill his purpose and kill Thanos. Eventually convincing Drax to aid him, Mar-Vell enters into a war against ISAAC, a sentient computer who served Thanos and now directs his forces. After a series of protracted battles, Mar-Vell convinces ISAAC's minion Elysius to join him, causing her to fall in love with Mar-Vell; he subsequently defeats ISAAC's other pawns Chaos and Tarterus and the warrior Stellarax on Earth. Mar-Vell eventually defeats ISAAC by entering the supercomputer's programming and forcing it to experience life. Mar-Vell meets Eon once again and reflects on the events of recent times.

=== 1980s ===
The Death of Captain Marvel graphic novel (1982). Cover art by Jim Starlin.

After a battle in the Dark Dimension, an encounter with the Hulk, and an adventure on an alien world, Mar-Vell discovers that his past exposure to Compound 13 has given him cancer. His nega-bands keep the cancer at bay, but also cause it to resist treatment, and he lacks access to Kree doctors since they consider him a traitor. As Mar-Vell accepts that his life is ending, many of his friends and allies come to Titan to pay their last respects. Even his mortal enemies the Skrulls send an envoy to bestow a medal on Mar-Vell to honor him as their greatest foe. In his final moments, Mar-Vell experiences a vision in which Thanos and Death guide him into the afterlife.

=== 1990s ===
When the Silver Surfer visits the Realm of the Dead, he is counselled and aided in his escape by someone who appears to be Mar-Vell, but is later revealed to be a manifestation of the selfless heroic ideal that is part of the Surfer's own psyche. Mar-Vell's former lover Elysius also impregnates herself with his genetic information, giving birth to a son, Genis-Vell.

=== 2000s ===
Visiting the Realm of the Dead, Genis encounters his father. He learns Elysius also gave birth to a girl, Phyla-Vell. The Young Avengers member Hulkling is revealed to be the child of Mar-Vell and the Skrull princess Anelle.

=== 2010s ===
During the "Chaos War" event, Mar-Vell and several deceased members of the Avengers return from the dead. He takes leadership of the group, helping protect several civilians and the comatose bodies of the main Avengers from chaos demons. Mar-Vell is impaled from behind by the Grim Reaper and is killed once more.

Some time later, Kree mystics resurrect Mar-Vell using a piece of the M'Kraan Crystal and a portion of the Phoenix Force. Controlling his mind, they use Captain Marvel against the Avengers. Mar-Vell is freed by Vision and sacrifices himself to save the Kree from the Phoenix Force, which threatens Hala while seeking to reclaim its missing energy.

== Powers and abilities ==
Due to his Kree physiology which had evolved to cope with the heavier gravity of home planet Hala, Mar-Vell was significantly stronger and more durable than a normal human. As a soldier, he was trained in all forms of Kree combat, possessed a superior knowledge of tactics, and was equipped with a device called a "universal beam" (or "uni-beam"); which was at first a handheld pistol before Mar-Vell converted it into a wrist-mounted device capable of projecting energy, emitting beams of pure darkness, and controlling magnetism.

When manipulated by "Zo" (actually Zarek, the Kree Imperial Minister), Mar-Vell became greatly enhanced, having his physical abilities augmented to the point of crushing the hardest substance known to the Kree, and gained the ability to generate illusions, teleport to anywhere in the universe, and fly at faster-than-light speeds. With the exception of strength, these abilities are lost when Mar-Vell gains the nega-bands, which convert Mar-Vell's psionic energy into greater strength, durability, speed, flight and enabled him to exist unprotected in deep outer space. Following the photon ray treatments, Mar-Vell was able to absorb solar energy to further increase his strength. By using solar energy, Mar-Vell was able to recover faster than an average human being. After his encounter with Eon, Mar-Vell used solar energy to fly, leaving a sparkling trail of photons in his wake.

Once named the "Protector of the Universe" by Eon, Mar-Vell gained "cosmic awareness", which allowed him to detect direct threats and perceive changes in the universe. This awareness was also used internally, and alerted Mar-Vell to his terminal cancer.

== Reception ==
=== Critical reception ===
IGN referred to Mar-Vell as one of the "greatest Avengers of all time," writing, "Mar-Vell seemed destined to live out his life as a respected hero and family man, but even the greatest of heroes can meet an unfortunate end. Mar-Vell contracted terminal cancer in a battle with the villain Nitro. He ultimately perished surrounded by friends, family, and comrades. Surprisingly in a universe where resurrections happen every other hour, Mar-Vell has yet to return to life. It remains to be seen whether that will stay true, but in life or death, Captain Marvel remains one of the most influential heroes in the Marvel Universe." David Harth of CBR.com described Mar-Vell as one of the "best cosmic heroes in Marvel comics," saying, "The Marvel universe always had a robust cosmic side, but Mar-Vell was the one who truly expanded Marvel's stories out into the stars. The first Captain Marvel started as a Kree soldier but became Earth's foremost cosmic defender, battling threats from outer space and beyond, vying with Thanos, and helping the Avengers when they needed it. Mar-Vell made Captain Marvel a legend. Whether he was fighting on Earth or in space, everyone respected him. His death brought heroes and villains alike out of the woodwork to mourn the cosmic champion in an unprecedented display of respect."

=== Accolades ===
- In 2012, IGN ranked Mar-Vell 24th in their "Top 50 Greatest Avengers of all time" list.
- In 2015, Entertainment Weekly ranked Mar-Vell 33rd in their "Let's rank every Avenger ever" list.
- In 2017, Den of Geek ranked Mar-Vell 3rd in their "Guardians of the Galaxy 3: 50 Marvel Characters We Want to See" list.
- In 2018, Comic Book Resources (CBR) ranked Captain Mar-Vell 9th in their "25 Fastest Characters In The Marvel Universe" list.
- In 2019, CBR ranked Mar-Vell 3rd in their "Every Version Of Captain Marvel" list and 3rd in their "All The Captain Marvels, Ranked" list.
- In 2020, CBR ranked Mar-Vell 2nd in their "The Kree: The 10 Most Powerful Members Of The Race" list and Mar-Vell's death 10th in their "Marvel: 10 Moments That Changed The Comic Universe's History Forever" list.
- In 2021, Screen Rant ranked Mar-Vell's death 3rd in their "10 Most Shocking Deaths In Marvel Comics" list.
- In 2022, CBR ranked Mar-Vell 4th in their "Marvel's 10 Most Powerful Healers" list and 10th in their "10 Best Cosmic Heroes in Marvel Comics" list.

== Literary reception ==
=== Volumes ===
==== The Death of Captain Marvel – 1982 ====
Mark Peters of Salon.com asserted, "This is one of comics legend Jim Starlin’s greatest works, showing that a writer/artist known for his cosmic stories is just as good at telling the most human story of all. Throughout the comic, Marvel’s greatest heroes search for a cure unsuccessfully, as close friends of Mar-Vell such as Rick Jones deal with the grief and try to help their friend cope." Christos Tsirbas of CBR.com stated, "The Death of Captain Marvel is still shocking, even 35 years after its initial publication because it shows the frailty and finality of the human condition without providing the comfort of a reset switch. The final fight is a dream and a metaphor. The promise of a new beginning is the last wish of a dying man. Mar-Vell’s heart stops and he is gone. It is a sobering end. This is why the greatest way to honor his legacy is to let Captain Marvel rest in peace. The gut-wrenching perfection of Starlin’s elegy to the hero will lose its impact if he is brought back to life. Mar-Vell’s greatest story—indeed one of the greatest stories in the superhero genre—will be rendered meaningless by his resurrection. Perhaps it is best to leave his mantle to those who have carried it since: Monica Rambeau, his own son Genis-Vell, and currently, Carol Danvers. After all, the moral of his story is that death is the end of all, but we can all leave a lasting legacy." Marc Buxton of Den of Geek wrote, "His final story is unforgettable, chilling, and poignant. The death story was so powerful that it would be impossible for Marvel Comics to undo it. It would somehow cheapen the moment and minimize the suffering of real warriors who battled cancer. So because of Starlin’s final Mar-Vell tale, the good Captain was no more. Yes, there would be some journeys to the afterlife where heroes would meet Mar-Vell again and there was even a teased return during the Secret Invasion event of the mid-2000s, but that turned out to be a Skrull in disguise. Mar-Vell is still dead. But his legacy would live on stronger than ever. After the tragic death, the hero Monica Rambeau took up the Captain Marvel name. Captain Mar-Vell’s son Genis would take up his father’s mantle as well. While Rambeau and Genis are fantastic characters in their own right (Rambeau would become Photon and Genis Legacy), it was not until Carol Danvers took up the legacy of her friend Mar-Vell that Marvel Comics found lasting success with the Captain Marvel name. But as we enter the next phase of the Captain Marvel story, let us never forget the life and death of Marvel’s first hero that took the name that has inspired so many." Matt D. Wilson of ComicsAlliance asserted, "Despite some overbearing religious imagery, The Death of Captain Marvel took a sensitive, poignant approach to Mar-Vell's battle with cancer, as well as his relationships with other heroes. There's a reason why it's a story that's stood the test of time, and it's a key reason lots of readers know of Mar-Vell at all."

== Other versions ==
- The Ultimate Marvel miniseries Ultimate Secret features a version of the character called Mahr Vehl, who aids Earth's heroes against Gah Lak Tus.
- In the Earth X miniseries, Mar-Vell is reincarnated as the child of the synthetic beings Him and Her.
- In The Thanos Imperative, the main antagonist is Lord Mar-Vell, an evil being from the "Cancerverse", a monstrous universe in which nothing can die. As such, all life has become cancerous undying beings, desperate to find a new universe to infect. He is the leader of the Revengers, who worship the entities known as the Many-Angled Ones.
- In Ruins, reporter Phil Sheldon interviews a bitter Mar-Vell, who now hates humanity as they destroyed almost all the Kree in his expedition.

== In other media ==
=== Television ===
- Captain Marvel appears in The Super Hero Squad Show, voiced by Ty Burrell. This version is Ms. Marvel's boyfriend.
- Mar-Vell, with elements of Mahr Vehl, appears in The Avengers: Earth's Mightiest Heroes, voiced by Roger Craig Smith. This version is a xenobiologist and a member of the Kree Science Navy who came to Earth to investigate a genetic anomaly, but became intrigued by humanity. Disguising himself as a human named Philip Lawson, he fell in love with Carol Danvers. When a Kree Sentry comes to evaluate Earth's threat to the Kree, Mar-Vell sacrifices his false identity to save Carol, the Wasp, and Ant-Man. In doing so, he accidentally imprints some of his Kree abilities to Carol. After he and the Avengers neutralize the Supreme Intelligence, Mar-Vell becomes the Kree's new leader.

=== Marvel Cinematic Universe ===
An original, female incarnation of Mar-Vell appears in media set in the Marvel Cinematic Universe (MCU), portrayed by Annette Bening. This version is a Kree scientist named Doctor Wendy Lawson and a physicist working for Project Pegasus.

- Bening portrayed Mar-Vell in Captain Marvel (2019) in flashbacks where she sought to use the power of the Tesseract to develop an experimental engine to assist the Skrulls. She recruits the help of Carol Danvers and Maria Rambeau to help her test the engines. She is later killed by Yon-Rogg but not before instructing Danvers to destroy the engine before he could seize it.
- An alternate universe variant of Mar-Vell appears in the What If...? (2023) episode "What If... Peter Quill Attacked Earth's Mightiest Heroes?", voiced by Keri Tombazian.

=== Video games ===
- Mar-Vell / Captain Marvel appears as a playable character in Marvel Super Hero Squad Online.
- Mar-Vell / Captain Marvel appears as an alternate costume for Genis-Vell in the PSP version of Marvel: Ultimate Alliance, voiced by Roger Rose.
- Mar-Vell appears as an enhanced costume for Carol Danvers / Ms. Marvel in Marvel Heroes, voiced by Josh Keaton.

== Collected editions ==
- Marvel Masterworks Captain Marvel:
  - Volume 1 collects Marvel Super-Heroes #12–13, Captain Marvel #1–9, 230 pages, September 2005, ISBN 978-0785118213
  - Volume 2 collects Captain Marvel #10–21, 272 pages, August 2007, ISBN 978-0785124306
  - Volume 3 collects Captain Marvel #22–33 and Iron Man #55, 288 pages, April 2008, ISBN 978-0785130154
  - Volume 4 collects Captain Marvel #34–46, 248 pages, January 2012, ISBN 978-0785158776
  - Volume 5 collects Captain Marvel #47–57, Avengers Annual #7, Marvel Two-In-One Annual #2, 288 pages, July 2014, ISBN 978-0785188926
  - Volume 6 collects Captain Marvel #58–62, Marvel Spotlight #1–4, 8, Marvel Super-Heroes #3, Marvel Graphic Novel #1, and material from Logan's Run #6, 296 pages, May 2016, ISBN 978-0785199946
- Essential Captain Marvel:
  - Volume 1 collects Marvel Super-Heroes #12–13, Captain Marvel #1–21, and Not Brand Echh #9, 512 pages, July 2008, ISBN 978-0785130598
  - Volume 2 collects Captain Marvel #22–46, Iron Man #55, Marvel Feature #12, 520 pages, December 2010, ISBN 978-0785145363
- The Life of Captain Marvel collects Iron Man #55, Captain Marvel #25–34, and Marvel Feature #12, 256 pages, October 1991, ISBN 978-0871356352
- The Life and Death of Captain Marvel collects Iron Man #55, Captain Marvel #25–34, Marvel Feature #12, and Marvel Graphic Novel #1, 304 pages, June 2002, ISBN 978-0785108375
- The Death of Captain Marvel collects Captain Marvel #34, Marvel Spotlight #1–2 and Marvel Graphic Novel #1, 128 pages, June 2010, ISBN 978-0785146278
- Avengers vs. Thanos collects Iron-Man #55, Captain Marvel #25–33, Marvel Feature #12, Daredevil #105–107, Avengers #125, Warlock #9-11, 15, Avengers Annual #7, Marvel Two-In-One Annual #2, and material from Logan's Run #6, 472 pages, March 2013, ISBN 978-0785168508
- Captain Marvel by Jim Starlin: The Complete Collection collects Iron-Man #55, Captain Marvel #25–34, Marvel Feature #12, Marvel Graphic Novel #1 and material from Daredevil #105 and Life of Captain Marvel #1–5, 352 pages, December 2016, ISBN 978-1302900175
- Captain Mar-Vell Omnibus Vol. 1 collects Marvel Super-Heroes #12–13, Captain Marvel #1–33, Iron Man #55, material from Not Brand Echh #9 and Life of Captain Marvel #1–5, 888 pages, ISBN 978-1302948658
