= Ego the Living Planet =

Marvel Comics character

- Ego the Living Planet as depicted in Fantastic Four #234 (September 1981). Art by John Byrne.

Publication information
- Publisher: Marvel Comics
- First appearance: Cameo appearance: The Mighty Thor #132 (September 1966); Full appearance: The Mighty Thor #133 (October 1966)
- Created by: Stan Lee; Jack Kirby

In-story information
- Alter ego: Egros
- Species: Sentient planet
- Place of origin: Black Galaxy
- Team affiliations: Nova Corps; Elders of the Universe
- Abilities: Exceptional intellect Matter manipulation Vast psionic powers

Ego the Living Planet is a fictional character appearing in American comic books published by Marvel Comics. The character first appeared in Thor #132 (September 1966) and was created by writer Stan Lee and artist Jack Kirby.

The character has made limited appearances in animation and video games, while Kurt Russell portrayed the character in the live-action Marvel Cinematic Universe film Guardians of the Galaxy Vol. 2 (2017), in which Ego claims to be a Celestial and father of Peter Quill and Mantis. Russell also voiced alternate timeline versions of Ego in the Disney+ animated series What If...? (2021).

== Publication history ==
Ego the Living Planet first appeared in The Mighty Thor #132 (September 1966), and was created by Jack Kirby.

Kirby created Ego as a way of exploring his fascination with the expanse of the universe. Ego, the alien Kree, and The Colonizers immediately followed the creation of Galactus, thus establishing Marvel Comics' own "space age mythology". As Kirby recalled in 1969, shortly after the character's debut, Ego's genesis came when:

I began to experiment ...and that's how Ego came about. ... A planet that was alive; a planet that was intelligent. That was nothing new either because there had been other stories [about] live planets but that's not acceptable. ... [Y]ou would say, 'Yeah, that's wild,' but how do you relate to it? Why is it alive? So I felt somewhere out in the universe, the universe ... becomes denser and turns liquid—and that in this liquid, there was a giant multiple virus, and if [it] remained isolated for millions and millions of years, it would ... begin to evolve by itself and it would begin to think. By the time we reached it, it might be quite superior to us—and that was Ego.

The first glimpse of Ego on the last page of Thor #132 is a full-page splash panel photo collage with his human features superimposed on a bulbous, chaotic planetoid. Kirby had been using photo collages for several years; this image has been called "his most effective and freakish to date."

Ego returned as a protagonist in Thor #160–161 (Jan.–Feb. 1969) and made a guest appearance in #201. His origin is explored in Thor #228.

Following appearances in Fantastic Four #234–235 (Sept.–Oct. 1981) and Rom #69 (Aug. 1985), Ego had a recurring role in Silver Surfer vol. 3 #4–22 (1987–1989). The character returned in the 1991 Thor annual and issues #448–450 (June–Aug 1992).

Ego played a prominent role in the company-wide crossover storyline "Maximum Security", appearing in Avengers #35 (Dec. 2000); Maximum Security: Dangerous Planet (Oct. 2000); Iron Man #34–35 (Nov.–Dec. 2000); X-Men Unlimited #29 (Dec. 2000); Gambit #23 (Dec. 2000), and Maximum Security #1–3 (Dec. 2000 – Jan. 2001).

The character returned in Nova vol. 4 #20–30 and Astonishing Thor #1–5 (Nov 2010 – July 2011).

Ego the Living Planet also appeared in the Oni Press Color Special.

== Fictional character biography ==
=== 1960s ===
Ego once told Thor that his existence was the result of a scientist merging with a planet when that planet's sun went nova.

Inside the Black Galaxy, Ego's ambitions turn towards conquest. He starts absorbing space vessels and other planets to gather strength. This behavior attracted the attention of the Rigellian Colonizers, who feared that the nearby Ego would consume their homeworld. They asked the help of the thunder god Thor, to defeat Ego. Accompanied by a Rigellian Recorder, Thor encountered Ego, who forced him into his body and created Anti-body minions to attack him, intending to test their strength and planning to send them across the universe to conquer other worlds. Thor fought them off and stunned Ego with a powerful storm. Feeling humiliated by his defeat, Ego vowed never to leave the Black Galaxy. Several months later, a weakened Galactus invaded Ego's space and sought to replenish his energy by consuming Ego. Thor aided Ego in battling Galactus and drove Galactus off. In gratitude, Ego takes in the Wanderers, a group of various alien races whose planets had been the first to be devoured by Galactus billions of years ago.

=== 1970s ===
The Rigellian Tana Nile took a sample of Ego to fertilize sterile worlds being considered for habitation. However, this drives Ego insane, and it soon gives in to its primordial urges and absorbs the Wanderers, which causes Thor to side with a returning Galactus. Assisted by Hercules and Firelord, Thor holds Ego off until Galactus attaches a massive starship engine to Ego's south pole, which drives him constantly through space and prevents him from being a threat to other planets and populated sections of the universe.

=== 1980s ===
Years later, Ego gains control of the engine and tracks Galactus to Earth, seeking vengeance. Unable to locate him, Ego attacks Earth. He causes massive destruction, which is later undone by a reality-altering mutant. The Fantastic Four attempted to defeat Ego by removing the power cell from one of the attached propulsion engines, which the Thing attempts to throw into Ego's "brain". In response, an angered Ego attempts to counter with his remaining engines but is propelled into the Sun.

Ego, however, slowly reforms from a few surviving particles and repairs the propulsion unit. Ego then digests a number of Dire Wraiths, to replenish its energy reserves, and battles the Space Knight Rom.

Ego later joins the Elders of the Universe in a plan to destroy Galactus. Ego is sidelined before the confrontation when he is defeated by the Silver Surfer. Ego subsequently captures the Silver Surfer and attempts to consume his energies.

=== 1990s ===
Ego attacks a Korbinite fleet and fights the hero Beta Ray Bill. Ego reveals to Bill that Galactus's propulsion unit is driving Ego mad, and the fleet subsequently destroys the propulsion unit. A sentient bio-verse, initially described as "Super-Ego", then begins to consume Ego, but Ego eventually escapes.

=== 2000s ===
Driven mad by the Supreme Intelligence, Ego lashes out at other planets, destroying them while trying to 'awaken' others like itself, until it is defeated in a battle with Professor X, the Silver Surfer and Cadre K. Ego is subsequently captured and sent to Earth as an "infant" in spore form. As Ego grows, it begins to consume the Earth, with the Supreme Intelligence intending to allow it to grow so that the Kree can take control of Ego and use it as a weapon against the rest of the universe. Quasar absorbs it to prevent this.

When Quasar dies during the Annihilation war, Ego was released back into the Universe, only to be approached by the Worldmind to join the new Nova Corps. Ego supplants Worldmind and brainwashes the Corps. Nova manages to defeat Ego and free Worldmind by lobotomizing the Living Planet. When Ego resurfaces his personality on his body, Nova stargates Mindless Ones into Ego's brain, injuring him and forcing him to stargate away.

=== 2010s ===
Ego learns he was one of two entities created by the Stranger for a science experiment, and that his brother Alter-Ego has been held in captivity by the Collector since birth. While Ego seeks a similar entity to itself, the Stranger has arranged for Alter-Ego to hate Ego, intending to learn through their battle if freedom or captivity breeds a stronger will. Alter-Ego is wounded and loses mass when Ego is forced to attack it in self-defense, but Thor intervenes before Ego can strike a killing blow. The fragments of Alter-Ego form into a moon of Ego, and the two begin to travel together as a family.

When Ego is infested by large insect-like creatures he hires Rocket Raccoon to eradicate them.

Galactus, changed into the Life-Bringer by the Ultimates, encounters Ego after regaining his strength after a battle with the new universal construct Lagos. Ego attacks Galactus as he journeys to his inner brain at the center of the planet, however loses control of his constructs, which realize that Galactus is not a threat. Ego then reveals that before his creation by the Stranger, his consciousness was that of a man named Egros, similar to Galactus' former self Galan. After formally meeting one another and putting aside their past animosities, Galactus uses his Life-Bringer abilities to form a body for the rest of Ego, who now calls himself Ego-Prime. Ego-Prime then joins Eternity Watch, a group Galactus has put together to deal with the First Firmament, the first iteration of all that is, who had chained Eternity.

Additionally, Ego is revealed to have a living moon named Illa, who is his daughter. Due to Illa orbiting on Ego's far side, the two rarely see one another until Moon Girl enables them to.

=== 2020s ===
Ego later allows a Skrull cult called the Brethren of the Forgotten Flame in its surface. However, the Guardians of the Galaxy discover that the cult is committing a mass sacrifice, encasing Ego in a dark shell. After breaking free of the shell, Ego is possessed by the cult's object of worship, Dormammu.

== Powers and abilities ==
The living planet named Ego has been called a "bioverse". Every part of his substance, including the atmosphere itself, is alive as much as it is controlled by the consciousness of Ego. He often molds his surface to appear as a giant face to address sentient beings and can shape his terrain at will, capable of terraforming his surface into a dead world or a beautiful paradise to lure unwitting space travelers. Ego has various internal features similar to a biological lifeform, with his consciousness being contained in a giant, brain-like organ below the surface. To defend himself, Ego can generate massive tentacles and Antibodies: non-sentient humanoid warriors that he commands, manipulate his own weather, raise his internal temperature, generate solid clouds to defend from space attacks, and control his own radiation and magnetic fields.

Ego can generate vast psionic energies that rival a hungered Galactus at their peak. He can project energy blasts to obliterate starships and planets, read minds and scan their biological structure, and use telepathy to communicate with sentient beings and mentally attack them. If his energy reserves diminish, Ego can restore them by devouring planets, tapping into stars, or digesting living beings.

Additionally, Ego is exceptionally intelligent, although as his name suggests, he harbors an extreme superiority complex and can be emotional if thwarted. For a while, Ego was propelled through space via the engine Galactus implanted on his south pole and controlled by his psionic powers, but eventually learned to travel at faster-than-light speeds without it.

== Other versions ==
=== Amalgam Comics ===
Two characters based on Ego appear in the Amalgam Comics universe: Oa the Living Planet, a fusion of Ego and Oa, and Ego-Mass, a fusion of Ego and the Source.

=== Exiles ===
Ego appears in Exiles #53 (December 2004). Set in the universe of Earth-4162, Ego grants Earth sentience in an attempt to create another living planet. However, the Fantastic Four and Exiles convince Earth to oppose Ego, with Blink killing Ego by drilling into his brain.

=== King Thor ===
An alternate universe version of Ego from Earth-14412 appears in Thor (vol. 5). This version wielded the Necrosword before being killed by Loki.

=== Marvel 2099 ===
An alternate universe version of Ego from Earth-2099 appears in Marvel 2099.

=== Marvel Adventures ===
Ego appears in Marvel Adventures: The Avengers #12 (June 2007), a series created for younger readers. In this story, Ego causes natural disasters on Earth when he arrives to woo Giant Girl.

=== Marvel Zombies 2 ===
In Marvel Zombies 2, Ego is one of the last few survivors of a reality-spanning zombie rampage. However, he is found and eaten.

== In other media ==
=== Television ===
- Ego the Living Planet appears in the Fantastic Four episode "To Battle the Living Planet", voiced by Kay E. Kuter.
- Ego the Living Planet appears in Silver Surfer, voiced by Roy Lewis.
- Ego the Living Planet makes a cameo appearance in The Super Hero Squad Show episode "World War Witch!".
- Ego the Living Planet appears in Hulk and the Agents of S.M.A.S.H., voiced by Kevin Michael Richardson. This version is controlled by Little Ego, a smaller version of his outer self that requires a connection to him to survive. If anyone else takes control of the host planet, it will assume the appearance of their head.

=== Marvel Cinematic Universe ===
Kurt Russell as Ego in the 2017 film Guardians of the Galaxy Vol. 2

Ego appears in media set in the Marvel Cinematic Universe, portrayed by Kurt Russell. This version is the father of Peter Quill and Mantis and claims to be a Celestial. Additionally, he came into existence millions of years ago and learned to use his cosmic powers to manipulate matter and form an entire planet around himself as well as utilize many resources and a humanoid avatar to interact with other sentient beings. However, he became bored of immortality and disappointed with a universe full of inferior life and sets out to remake the universe in his image via seedlings planted on various worlds.

- In Guardians of the Galaxy Vol. 2, Ego finds Quill, explains his plan, and reveals he requires the power of another Celestial to activate the seedlings. To achieve this, Ego mated with various species until a suitable offspring was conceived to facilitate his plan, with Quill being the only offspring to have inherited his power. However, Quill rebels against Ego after learning that the latter had killed his mother and joins the Guardians of the Galaxy in killing Ego and foiling his plan.
- Alternate timeline variants of Ego appear in What If...?, voiced by Russell.

=== Video games ===
- Ego the Living Planet appears in Lego Marvel Super Heroes.
- Ego the Living Planet appears in Lego Marvel Super Heroes 2. Additionally, the MCU incarnation appears as a playable character via the Guardians of the Galaxy Vol. 2 DLC.

=== Music ===
American rock band Monster Magnet recorded a song titled "Ego the Living Planet" which was released on their album Dopes to Infinity.

== Reception ==
In his 1972 book Outlaws of America, author Roger Lewis argues that Ego the Living Planet reflected risks to civilization, humans and planet Earth that people were contemplating in the 1960s, when he was initially conceived.

The 2007 storyline "Ego the Loving Planet", which ran in Marvel Adventures: The Avengers #12, featuring Ego in a main capacity, and was praised by Ray Tate of ComicsBulletin for its simultaneous inventiveness and logical sense.

In August 2009, Time listed Ego as one of the "Top 10 Oddest Marvel Characters".

In the 2015 book Marvel Comics in the 1960s, Pierre Comtois stated that, "With the creation of Ego [Lee and Kirby], unbelievably, managed to equal if not top their introduction of Galactus only a few months before. Not just a living planet, but a living "bio-verse", Ego presents the reader with a menace so gigantic, so incalculable that it dwarfed even a character with the power of a god."

== See also ==
- Mogo
- Boltzmann brain
- Gaia (Foundation universe)
