= List of Marvel Comics characters: N =

== N'astirh ==
N'astirh

Publication information
- Publisher: Marvel Comics
- First appearance: X-Factor #32 (October 1988)
- Created by: Louise Simonson (writer); Jon Bogdanove (artist)

In-story information
- Alter ego: N'astirh
- Species: Demon
- Partnerships: N'asteris (subordinate demons); Demons of Limbo; S'ym; Belasco; Magik; Madelyne Pryor
- Abilities: Magical powers Techno-organic virus

N'astirh is a character appearing in American comic books published by Marvel Comics. N'astirh first appeared in X-Factor #32 and was created by Louise Simonson and Jon Bogdanove.

N'astirh is a demon from Otherplace with great magical skills and a master manipulator. Despite his power and loyalty to his lord Belasco, Belasco passes him over as a potential apprentice, seeing demons as fit only to be servants. When Illyana Rasputin rises up to replace Belasco as lord of Otherplace, N'astirh steals Belasco's spellbook and flees from Limbo into Earth's past. After years of study, he masters all the spells in the book.

Using Belasco's stolen book of spells, N'astirh sends demons to abduct mutant infants, and is given Wiz Kid as a captive. N'astirh is informed by Cameron Hodge about Mister Sinister's orphanage for mutant children. When Hobgoblin offers to make a Faustian bargain to trade his soul for the power of a demon, N'astirh scoffs at the offer, and on a whim, he grants Hobgoblin the requested power free of charge by fusing him with a demon, which would eventually break away to become Demogoblin. N'astirh also makes a pact with Madelyne Pryor, who uses this alliance to get revenge against the Marauders and the safe return of her son Nathan.

Madelyne Pryor, N'astirh and S'ym plot a demonic invasion, starting with Manhattan. N'astirh and S'ym manipulate Illyana Rasputin into opening an inter-dimensional portal at the Empire State Building, through which N'astirh's demons invade Manhattan. During the invasion, N'astirh coerces Illyana, Meggan, and Madelyne towards their darker sides. Illyana eventually closes the portal, sealing the demons in Limbo. While N'astirh battles S'ym for rule of Limbo and Earth, he is infected and transformed by the transmode virus. He claims he has 'become' magic, since he can now process and cast spells almost simultaneously. N'astirh captures Nathan Summers. When N'astirh learns Madelyne has fallen into madness, he returns and presents Madylyne her son as a sacrifice. He is ultimately destroyed by an overload of lightning driven into him by Storm.

N'astirh is resurrected by Illyana Rasputin, who herself had been resurrected by Belasco. He no longer seems to possess the enhancements and abilities given to him as a result of his exposure to the techno-organic virus. He also appears to be far more animalistic and savage than before and has not displayed any of the cunning and manipulative personality traits he once had.

Vast magical powers grant him the ability to manipulate the forces of magic for various effects, generate mystical energy as force bolts and protective shields, increase his size and strength, regenerate his injuries and tap into the innate evil of humans and turn them into demons with a touch. He also has the ability of flight due to his natural leather wings. Transformation by the techno-organic transmode virus allows him the ability to alter his own shape and can rebuild his body from a single cell when destroyed or injured, and he can infect others with the transmode virus, converting them into "techno-organic" beings and absorbing their life energy. The virus also granted him a computer like mind allowing him to cast spells and process them almost simultaneously. N'astirh has a gifted intellect, and possesses extensive knowledge of black magic gained through study of Belasco's principal book of sorcery.

=== N'astirh in other media ===
- Android replicas of N'astirh appear as mini-bosses in Spider-Man and the X-Men in Arcade's Revenge.
- N'astirh appears in Marvel Heroes, voiced by Steve Blum.

== Naga ==
Naga

Publication information
- Publisher: Marvel Comics
- First appearance: Sub-Mariner #9 (January 1969)
- Created by: Roy Thomas (writer); Marie Severin (artist)

In-story information
- Alter ego: Naga
- Team affiliations: Lemuria, Set
- Abilities: Underwater survival Superhuman strength With the Serpent Crown: mind control, ability to project bolts of mystical energy, teleportation, matter transformation abilities, further increased strength levels, immortality.

Naga is a supervillain appearing in American comic books published by Marvel Comics. Naga was created by writer Roy Thomas and artist Marie Severin and first appeared in Sub-Mariner #9 (January 1969).

A member of Homo mermanus, Naga ruled the underwater nation of Lemuria. After falling under the thrall of the malevolent serpent god, Set, Naga became a mutated, long-lived and superpowered emperor of Lemuria. He was later assassinated by his own ally, Karthon the Quester.

== Wilfred Nagel ==
Wilfred Nagel is a scientist who was tasked with recreating the super-soldier serum following the death of its creator, Abraham Erskine. To this end, Nagel recruited 300 African-American soldiers for use as subjects. Isaiah Bradley was the only person to survive the procedures and took on the mantle of Captain America.

=== Wilfred Nagel in other media ===
Wilfred Nagel appears in The Falcon and the Winter Soldier, portrayed by Olli Haaskivi. This version is a former Hydra scientist who was contracted by Power Broker to recreate the super-soldier serum. Amidst an attack by Madripoor bounty hunters, Nagel is killed by Helmut Zemo.

== Native ==
Native is a character appearing in American comic books published by Marvel Comics. Native first appeared in Wolverine vol. 3 #13 and was created by Greg Rucka and Darick Robertson.

Native was captured by the Weapon X program, the same program that gave the X-Men's Wolverine his adamantium skeleton. The scientists working there gave her the codename of "Feral." When Wolverine escaped from the organization, so did Native. Wolverine and Native spent some time together in a cabin on the hills of British Columbia, where they became lovers for some time. It is unclear why Wolverine left Native. Trying to survive, Native's presence was rediscovered years later by an offshoot of Weapon X led by Mr. Willoughby. Sabretooth was brought in by Willoughby to track and retrieve her with the help of the hunters Bowen and Peary. Sabretooth tracked her down, only for her to kill Bowen and Peary, outfight Sabretooth, and flee. Sabretooth then manipulated Wolverine into finding her upon visiting him in a bar in Montana. When Wolverine found Native, she shared a romantic interlude with him. Wolverine and Native were tracked by soldiers from the Weapon X offshoot who immobilized him and captured Native, whom they brought to The Workshop facility in Montana.

While in captivity of Weapon X, Native was operated on by Doctor Vapor, who removed genetic material from her to be sold to other parties and discovered that Native's accelerated physiology had resulted in a pregnancy from her liaison with Wolverine.

Wolverine killed Doctor Vapor and left with Native. However, the pair were watched by Sabretooth who promised to finish what he started. Tracking the couple, Sabretooth revealed Native's condition, defeated Wolverine and subsequently killed Native.

Native was a mutant who possessed a healing factor that allows her to recover from even the most severe wounds with remarkable speed. She also possessed superhumanly acute senses, as well as having sufficient superhuman strength and ferocity to allow her to successfully subdue an opponent over twice her size. Native's physiology was also accelerated to the extent that her body could conceive and gestate a fetus within a matter of hours. Despite the extent of her healing factor, Native was not immortal.

== Nature Girl ==
Lin Li, also known as Nature Girl and Armageddon Girl, is a character appearing in American comic books published by Marvel Comics. The character was created by Jason Latour and Mahmud Asrar, and made her first appearance in Wolverine and the X-Men (vol. 2) #1 (March 2014).

Lin Li is a mutant who possesses antlers and an affinity with nature, allowing her to communicate with and control animals and plants. Lin enrolled at the Jean Grey School for Higher Learning. She made connections to Krakoa and the Bamfs while at the school, as well a friendship with fellow student Trevor Hawkins (Eye-Boy).

Lin Li becomes a citizen of Krakoa when it is established as a mutant nation. On Krakoa, Lin becomes disillusioned with the way nature is treated. She forms X-Men Green, an eco-terrorist group, alongside the mutant Curse. In part due to Curse's influence, Lin becomes increasingly malicious, leading her to turn against the X-Men.

=== Nature Girl in other media ===
- Nature Girl makes non-speaking appearances in X-Men '97.
- Nature Girl appears in Marvel's Wolverine. This version is a member of the Morlocks.

== Nebulo ==
Nebulo is an Inhuman whose Terrigenesis turned him into a living shadow. Nebulo is among the evil Inhumans who are judged by Black Bolt. Nebulo, Aireo, Falcona, Leonus, Stallior, and Timberius are banished to the Un-Place by Black Bolt until an incident causes them to be accidentally freed by Hulk. Nebulo and the Inhumans side with Maximus in his plans to take the throne from Black Bolt.

== Evelyn Necker ==
Evelyn Necker is a character appearing in American comic books published by Marvel Comics. She first appeared as a supporting character in Death's Head (second series) #1, published by the Marvel UK imprint, and was created by Dan Abnett and Liam Sharp. In 2008, writers Dan Abnett and Andy Lanning (DnA) used Necker as a supporting character while writing Nova, as a member of Project Pegasus during that comic's involvement with Marvel's Secret Invasion event. In the story, it was mentioned that Necker was working on a project to develop a cyborg called "Minion." DnA said "This is us just having fun- the Death's Head thread has recently been worked back into the Marvel Universe via Planet Hulk, and we thought we would tie a few loose ends together."

Necker is a scientist working for A.I.M in the year 2020 of an alternate future. Her funding was being cut, and so her MINION cyborg super soldier project had a few corners cut on quality. The first attempt (in 2018) was run by an automobile engine and had the brain of a homeless alcoholic. This being became known as Death Wreck, and stumbled into various cross-time adventures (as told in his own short-lived comic, Death Wreck).

== Necrom ==
Necrom is a supervillain appearing in Marvel Comics. The character was created by writer/artist Alan Davis, and first appeared in Excalibur #46 (January 1992), which depicted him as the previous Sorcerer Supreme of an alternate reality who sought the power of the cosmic entity known as the Phoenix Force.

Necrom was the mentor of Merlyn and Feron, two students that he attempted to use to harness magical energy, but the pair turned on Necrom after he absorbs a portion of the Phoenix Force, causing him to retreat. Merlyn created the Captain Britain Corps and Feron trained his descendant to defeat Necrom in the event of his return. Necrom conquers an alternate Earth, but is defeated by Kylun and flees to the main Marvel Universe. He faces Excalibur and is killed when Rachel Summers tricks him into absorbing her portion of the Phoenix Force.

== Necromancer ==
Necromancer is the name of several characters appearing in American comic books published by Marvel Comics.

=== Stephen Strange of Counter-Earth ===
Necromancer is the Counter-Earth counterpart of Stephen Strange. He killed Counter-Earth's Baron Mordo to avenge the death of the Ancient One. Necromancer planned to use Counter-Earth's Book of the Vishanti to conquer Earth only to end up trapped inside it by Eternity.

=== Necromancer (demon) ===
The second Necromancer is a shapeshifting demon.

=== Michael Hawthorne ===
Michael Hawthorne was a boy who discovered that he was born with necromanctic abilities after he brought his pet hamster back to life. After a brief time as a member of S.H.I.E.L.D.'s magic division, Michael Hawthorne became Necromancer and revived the dead Presidents of the United States. This did not go the way he hoped and was rescued by Deadpool who handed him over to Doctor Strange.

== Needle ==
Needle (Josef Saint) is an elderly tailor who was mugged one night while leaving work, losing an eye and his capability of speech. While recuperating, he discovers that he has the ability to paralyze others with his gaze. Seeking revenge, Saint assumes the guise of the vigilante Needle. Armed with a yard-long needle, Needle attacks young men on the streets at night, sewing their mouths shut. After victimizing S.H.I.E.L.D. agent Jerry Hunt, Needle is attacked by Hunt's girlfriend Spider-Woman, who takes him out with a close-range venom blast. Needle is subsequently arrested.

Needle joins the Night Shift and works with Captain America to battle the Power Broker and his augmented mutates. Alongside the Night Shift, he tests Moon Knight to take over as the group's leader. Needle battles the West Coast Avengers alongside Satannish, who enhances his abilities using black magic.

Needle appears with the Night Shift, as part of the Hood's gang. They battle the Midnight Sons, and Needle impales Daimon Hellstrom with his needle before Jennifer Kale knocks him off with a spell. Needle and the Night Shift are killed and subsequently resurrected as zombies after being exposed to an airborne virus. When Jennifer Kale and Black Talon contain the virus within Zombie, the Night Shift members are restored to normal.

== Negator ==
Negator is a character appearing in American comic books published by Marvel Comics. He first appeared in Marvel Two-in-One #88 (October 1983).

The Negator was a man suffering from radiation poisoning who wore a suit to give him superhuman strength. He was defeated by Thing and She-Hulk.

== Nels van Adder ==
Nels van Adder, also known as the Proto-Goblin, is a Marvel Comics character and Spider-Man villain who served as the first test subject for Norman Osborn's unstable Goblin Formula. Created by Howard Mackie and Dan Fraga, he first appeared in Peter Parker: Spider-Man #-1 (1997).

=== Nels van Adder in other media ===
Nels Van Adder was originally planned to appear as an antagonist in the 2012 film The Amazing Spider-Man, before being cut from the final script. Parts of Van Adder's planned role were rolled into Dr. Rajit Ratha (played by actor Irrfan Khan), an Oscorp executive who interacts with Dr. Curt Connors and the cross-species genetics research.

== Neophyte ==
Neophyte (Simon Hall) is a character appearing in American comic books published by Marvel Comics. Created by writer Scott Lobdell and artist John Romita Jr., the character first appeared in Uncanny X-Men #300 (May 1993). Hall belongs to the subspecies of humans called mutants, and he has the power to phase himself and others through matter. He is able to use this ability to travel vast distances through solid objects. He is affiliated with the Acolytes.

== Neptune ==
Neptune, also called Poseidon, is a character appearing in American comic books published by Marvel Comics. The character is based on the Roman god of the same name and his Greek counterpart. Neptune is the god of the sea in the Olympian pantheon, as well as patron god over Atlantis. Neptune first appeared in Tales to Astonish #70 and was adapted by Stan Lee and Gene Colan.

== Nerd Hulk ==
Nerd Hulk is a clone created by Gregory Stark from Bruce Banner's stem cells. He has retained Banner's intelligence as well as the Hulk's brute strength. Captain America proved this to be a severe disadvantage as it took away the rage that was behind the Hulk's boundless strength and unpredictability, allowing Captain America to best Nerd Hulk in combat with relative ease.

Nerd Hulk joins the Avengers in confronting the Red Skull in Alaska. Nerd Hulk is terrified of the Cosmic Cube-wielding the Red Skull. However, Black Widow forces him to confront the Red Skull head on, and he at first appears to be successful in crushing the Cosmic Cube. This was quickly revealed to be an illusion created by the Red Skull who then blasts Nerd Hulk away, sending him flying into the sky.

After a team of Avengers are sent to protect a potential target of Ghost Rider, Nerd Hulk and Black Widow learn the origin of Ghost Rider and the next target is the Vice-president. He hates the code name "Nerd Hulk", so he decides to simply be known as Bruce Banner and he becomes a full staff member.

In Ultimate Comics Avengers 3, Banner is transformed into the Vampire King and is killed by Captain America.

== Network ==
Network is an alias utilized by several characters appearing in American comic books published by Marvel Comics.

=== Sarah Vale ===
Sarah Vale is a technopathic mutant who appears in the Marvel series New X-Men: Academy X as a student at the Xavier Institute for Higher Learning. The character, created by Nunzio DeFilippis and Christina Weir, first appeared in New X-Men vol. 2 #5 (September 2004). She is the sister of fellow student Preview. In New X-Men #23 (2006), Sarah and several other students are killed by the Purifiers. Sarah was resurrected by the Five during the Krakoan Age.

=== Valerie Martin ===
Valerie Martin is a superhero with cybernetic body armor that grants Internet searching abilities. The character, created by Paul Jenkins and Ramon Bachs, first appeared in Civil War: Front Line #4 (September 2006). She was among the anti-Registration Act faction of heroes during the superhero civil war. She tries to use her powers to locate Captain America and the Secret Avengers to join them, but before she can she and the other members of her group are apprehended by S.H.I.E.L.D. Network is one of the 142 registered superheroes who are part of the 50-State Initiative.

=== Other versions of Network ===
An Ultimate Marvel equivalent of Network named Seth Vale is a former mutant prisoner of Camp: Angel who joins the resistance led by Kitty Pryde.

=== Network in other media ===
The Sarah Vale incarnation of Network appears in Wolverine and the X-Men, voiced by Grey DeLisle.

== Neutron ==
- First appearance: X-Men #107 (October 1977)
- Created by: Chris Claremont and Dave Cockrum
- Species: Stygian
- Teams: Imperial Guard
- Abilities: Superhuman strength, stamina, and durability; Capable of increasing the mass, density or gravity of an object; Siphon energy from constructs through physical contact, thereby weakening them

Neutron (originally called Quasar) is a character appearing in American comic books published by Marvel Comics. Created by Chris Claremont and Dave Cockrum, the character first appeared in X-Men #107 (October 1977).

Neutron is a member of an alien race known as Stygians, and is a member of the Imperial Guard, a group of super-powered alien warriors who serve the ruler of the Shi'ar empire. Quasar/Neutron's main power is to increase the mass, density or gravity of an object. He also possesses superhuman strength and the ability to siphon energy through physical contact. Like many members of the Imperial Guard, Neutron is the analog of a character from DC Comics' Legion of Super-Heroes: in his case Star Boy.

=== Neutron in other media ===
Neutron appears as a mini-boss in Marvel: Ultimate Alliance, voiced by James Sie.

== Nezarr the Calculator ==
Nezarr the Calculator is a Celestial who is a mathematician and possesses the ability to project illusions.

== Night Thrasher ==
Night Thrasher is the name of two characters appearing in American comic books published by Marvel Comics.

=== Donyell Taylor ===
Night Thrasher (Donyell Taylor), also known as Bandit, is a character from Marvel Comics. He first appeared in Night Thrasher (vol. 2) #3 (October 1993), and was created by Fabian Nicieza and Ken Lashley. Donyell is the older half-brother of Dwayne Taylor, the original Night Thrasher.

Donyell Taylor was born after a one-night stand between his unnamed mother and Daryl Taylor, father of Dwayne Taylor. Daryl Taylor was a rich business man who had turned the inheritance from the deaths of his parents into a hundred times the amount he was given. With it he set up charitable foundations like the Taylor Foundation. Daryl had been married to Dwayne's mother Melody since they were 18 years old. Daryl met Donyell's mother while at the bar in the Fairmont Hotel in Chicago. Daryl paid Donyell's mother a check worth six figures to keep quiet of their affair after she revealed she was pregnant. Donyell resented Dwayne for having the money and the family he never had. Dwayne resented the notion that his life was somehow any better because he barely remembered his parents, who were murdered by Silhouette's father Andrew Chord.

Donyell took the name Bandit and began targeting Night Thrasher's old foes to prove he was superior to Dwayne. Dwayne would later endure a severe beating at Bandit's hands. Later wanting a rematch, Bandit abducts Silhouette keeping her tied to a chair under blinding lights to lure Dwayne into a confrontation, but Dwayne wins the rematch. Donyell begins sleeping with Silhouette soon afterwards. When Night Thrasher, Silhouette, and various other members of the New Warriors are sent back in time Donyell joins Hindsight, Sprocket, and his father's killer Andrew Chord in creating a new team of New Warriors to save the originals. Donyell later comes to terms with his half-brother, finding common ground during their battle against Sphinx.

==== Powers and abilities of Donyell Taylor ====
Bandit is a mutant with bioelectrical powers that require physical contact and a conductive medium to work. He can channel an electrical charge strong enough to stun, injure, or kill through someone just by touching them. He augments the range of this power by shooting special wire-tethered quarrels from his wristbow. In additional, Bandit is an accomplished marksman, acrobat, and martial artist.

Bandit carries a specialized wrist mounted crossbow, that fires wire-tethered quarrels tipped with miniature grappling barbs which would penetrate an opponent's flesh and then open up beneath the skin. He then uses his powers to send a debilitating bio-electric charge along the electrically conductive tether, basically making himself a living taser. He also carries a variety of throwing stars.

His Night Thrasher armor, apart from giving him added protection, enables him to create solid energy weapons, such as a bo staff, escrima sticks, and wrist blades. At one point he banged the sticks together to create an energy shockwave. He also displayed a jet pack and used Pym Particles to shrink himself and others down.

== Nighthawk ==
Nighthawk is the name of two characters appearing in American comic books published by Marvel Comics.

== Nightshade ==
Nightshade is the name of three characters appearing in American comic books published by Marvel Comics.

=== Netherworld Nightshade ===
The man also known as Nightshade is from the Netherworld and the twin brother of Wolfsbane. He wielded Excalibre, but his sword was shattered by the Black Knight. Nightshade could transform into a giant raven and used the enchanted sword Nightbringer.

=== Logan Lewis ===
Logan Lewis is Tilda Johnson's younger cousin, who followed her legacy by adopting the Nightshade codename for heroism.

She is a potential candidate for membership in the New Champions and is among the young superheroes who aided the New Champions in fighting an army of zombie trolls.

== Nightside ==
Nightside (originally code-named Nightshade) is a character appearing in American comic books published by Marvel Comics. Created by Chris Claremont and Dave Cockrum, the character first appeared in X-Men #107 (October 1977). The character can tap into the Darkforce dimension, giving her the ability to conjure absolute darkness within a radius around her or her enemies. She can displace projectile attacks against her person by opening small apertures into the Darkforce. Like many original members of the Imperial Guard, Nightside is the analog of a character from DC Comics' Legion of Super-Heroes: in her case Shadow Lass.

== Emil Nikos ==
Emil Nikos is a character appearing in American comic books published by Marvel Comics. Created by Roy Thomas and Gil Kane, the character first appeared in The Amazing Spider-Man #102 (November 1971).

Emil Nikos was the best friend of Michael Morbius; the two grew up with him and went to university together, majoring in biochemistry. Emil dedicated his life to seeking the cure to Michael's rare blood disease and they won the Nobel Prize in Biology for their efforts before their experiment failed. Emil was Morbius the Living Vampire's first victim. His body was discovered by Martine Bancroft, and he was transformed into a vampire by Baron Blood.

Emil possessed the typical powers associated with vampires.

=== Emil Nikos in other media ===
A variation of the character renamed Emil Nicholas appears in Morbius, portrayed by Jared Harris. This version is a scientist based in Greece and the surrogate father of the title character and Lucien (Milo). Nicholas recognizes Milo as a vampire and begs him to stop until he is killed by him.

== Pitt'o Nili ==
Pitt'o Nili is a character appearing in American comic books published by Marvel Comics. The character, created by Brian Michael Bendis and Leinil Francis Yu, first appeared in Secret Invasion #1 (April 2008). He is a Skrull who impersonated Captain America (Steve Rogers) to the point of being brainwashed as per Veranke's orders. Nili and a Skrull group disguised as superheroes fake an escape to Earth to confuse the Avengers' splinter groups where their ship crashed into the Savage Land. Nili is confronted by Spider-Man and some of the Savage Land inhabitants, before he is exposed by poison darts deadly to Skrulls and killed by Shanna the She-Devil and Ka-Zar.

=== Pitt'o Nili in other media ===
- Pitt'o Nili appears in The Avengers: Earth's Mightiest Heroes, voiced by Brian Bloom. This version impersonated Captain America to disrupt the Avengers for the Skrulls' invasion of Earth.
- Pitt'o Nili appears as a boss in Marvel Avengers: Battle for Earth, voiced by Roger Craig Smith.
- Pitt'o Nili appears as a boss in Marvel Heroes.
- An alternate universe version of Pitt'o Nili makes a non-speaking cameo appearance in the What If...? series finale "What If... What If...?".

== Nimrod ==
Nimrod is the name of two characters appearing in American comic books published by Marvel Comics. The first Nimrod is a Sentinel. The second Nimrod first appeared in Dracula Lives! #3 (October 1973), and was created by Marv Wolfman and John Buscema.

=== Nimrod (vampire) ===
Nimrod was a former soldier appointed by Varnae to be the lord of Earth's vampires, and was granted the ability to control other vampires mentally. Nimrod captured Dracula on the night Dracula became a vampire, and forced Dracula to submit to him. Dracula challenged Nimrod to a battle with wooden stakes. As Varnae predicted and anticipated, Dracula slew Nimrod in the duel and succeeded him as the new Lord of Earth's Vampires.

== Nocturne ==
Nocturne is the name of several characters appearing in American comic books published by Marvel Comics.

=== Angela Cairn ===
Angela Cairn is a detective in the New York City Police Department who found evidence that proved to Spider-Man and Ashley Kafka that Harry Osborn was Green Goblin. Cairn was captured by the Mutilation Killer and brought to Helmut Zemo, who mutated her into a bat-winged form called Nocturne. After taking an earring that was gifted to her by her mother to remember who she once was, Nocturne later met Puma, befriended him, and lived with him. When Puma saw Spider-Man, he attacked him in a rage which led to Nocturne accidentally getting slashed in the face. As Puma fled, Spider-Man and Nocturne went after him. When they found him, Nocturne infused each one with their respective pains. This enabled Puma to return to normal. As Puma left, Nocturne declined Spider-Man's help again and flew away.

=== Graham Poldark ===
On Earth-9561, Graham Poldark is a man with a rare disorder that left him unable to stop moving. He stumbled upon the lair of a 1930s pulp hero named Night Raven. He donned an extra high-tech costume and became a superhero called Nocturne. Nocturne's costume gives him heightened physical attributes, a wired nervous system, an advanced cloaking device, and integrated utilities and gadgets stored in the lower back of his belt.

=== Bridget Warner ===
Bridget Warner is a mutant and member of the Hellions who can generate "ebon energy".

=== First Line villain ===
Nocturne is the alias of an unnamed vampire and patriotism believer who can control the undead. Despite being a vampire, Nocturne is able to survive in sunlight thanks to one of Diablo's potions.

== Criti Noll ==
Criti Noll is the name of two characters appearing in American comic books published by Marvel Comics. The character, created by Brian Michael Bendis and Olivier Coipel, first appeared as Hank Pym in House of M #1 (June 2005). The Skrull impersonated Ant-Man, Giant-Man, and Yellowjacket during the Secret Invasion storyline.

=== First version ===
The original version posed as a female student of Oxford University before she utilized her identity theft victim's abilities in order to infiltrate the Avengers for various events, such as the Scarlet Witch's altered reality and a superhero civil war fighting alongside Iron Man, Mister Fantastic and Black Widow against Captain America and the Falcon. Noll tries deserting the Skrulls' cause during global chaos before she is contained. Her body is reprogrammed for the Skrull Empire's army, fighting the Young Avengers and Nick Fury's team before being killed by Ms. Marvel.

=== Second version ===
A second version utilized "improvisation" for the Skrulls' cause, posing initially as a government agent. He is part of a superhero government program alongside Henry Peter Gyrich and Baron Von Blitzschlag, assists against Ultron, and has a secret romance with Tigra (which resulted in their illegitimate child William Nelson). Noll ultimately revealed himself during the Skrull Empire's invasion of Earth by disabling Mister Fantastic and is with Veranke's armada fighting the Avengers' splintered groups and the Thunderbolts before being defeated by Stature. Noll is later killed by Crusader.

=== Powers and abilities of Criti Noll ===
Both versions of Criti Noll can physically shapeshift (like other Skrulls) and primarily utilize the powers of Hank Pym and others individuals, such as the Hulk, the Vision, Black Panther and Quicksilver.

=== Criti Noll in other media ===
- Criti Noll appears in The Avengers: Earth's Mightiest Heroes, voiced by Jennifer Hale (true form albeit uncredited) and by Fred Tatasciore (Super-Skrull form).
- Criti Noll appears as a boss in Marvel Avengers: Battle for Earth.
- Criti Noll appears as a boss in Marvel Heroes.

== Cole North ==
Cole North is a detective of the NYPD who originally came from Chicago, Illinois. He is assigned to a homicide case regarding Daredevil and had no liking to vigilantes like some of his co-workers. After North apprehends Daredevil following a public fist fight, his reputation is lessened among his co-workers. North is further humiliated when Daredevil is sprung out of police custody by Punisher. When Mayor Wilson Fisk directs the NYPD to take down local vigilantes, North is assigned to go after Spider-Man.

=== Cole North in other media ===
Cole North appears in Daredevil: Born Again, portrayed by Jeremy Earl. This version is a member of the Anti-Vigilante Task Force (AVTF), led by Wilson Fisk. North later betrays Fisk, but is arrested for his actions as a member of the AVTF.

== Nova ==
Nova is the name of several characters appearing in American comic books published by Marvel Comics.

== Nuke ==
Nuke is the name of several characters appearing in American comic books published by Marvel Comics.

=== Albert Gaines ===
Nuke is a member of the alternate-reality Squadron Supreme. Another version of the character appears in the title Supreme Power.

==== Squadron Supreme ====
Albert was a nuclear plant worker when he accidentally gained his superhuman powers. He became Nuke, an adventurer and member of the Squadron Supreme, and a super-powered hero who kept his identity a secret from even his own family.

Alongside the other Squadron members, he became mind-controlled by the Over-Mind. He was used along with the other members as pawns in the Over-Mind's conquest of "Other-Earth," until he was freed by the Defenders. He battled and defeated the Over-Mind and Null the Living Darkness alongside the Squadron and the Defenders.

Alongside the Squadron Supreme, Nuke assumes control of the United States government, and publicly reveals his true identity. Nuke then discovers out that his parents were dying from radiation poisoning, brought on by exposure to his powers. Nuke turned to Tom Thumb to help find a cure; when Tom cannot and his parents die, a grief-stricken Nuke vows revenge and goes on a rampage. Doctor Spectrum restrains him by encasing him in an energy bubble construct, but Nuke's powers burn up the oxygen supply inside the bubble and he suffocates.

Albert Gaines was imbued with superhuman powers as a result of mutation through exposure to radioactive waste products, giving him immunity to the effects of radiation and the ability to generate nuclear energy within his body, which he can mentally manipulate to project destructive bursts. This has the side effect of him continually giving off low-level radiation. Towards the end of his life, Nuke also wears an air-conditioned radiation containment suit equipped with a radiometer to measure his radiation output, designed by Tom Thumb. Nuke is a fair hand-to-hand combatant, and received coaching from Nighthawk.

==== Supreme Power ====
Nuke is introduced as Al Gaines, a young, severely depressed man living underground in a fallout shelter alone because his body emits high levels of radiation he cannot control. General Alexander offers him a suit that will control his radiation output in return for fighting Hyperion, whom Alexander blames for his condition. Nuke goes on to join the government's Squadron Supreme.

=== Nuke in other media ===
The Squadron Supreme version of Nuke appears in Avengers Assemble, voiced by Phil LaMarr. This version is an alien and a member of the Squadron Supreme.

== Null ==
Null, also called Null the Living Darkness, is a demon and enemy of the Defenders and the Squadron Supreme. It was created by J. M. DeMatteis and first appeared in Defenders #103 (October 1981).

Null is a demonic entity created from the negative impulses of the S'raphh, an extinct angelic species. It battled, and was seemingly destroyed by, the Defenders and the Squadron Supreme.

=== Null in other media ===
Null the Living Darkness appears in the Hulk and the Agents of S.M.A.S.H. episode "Fear Itself", voiced by John DiMaggio. This version appears as a living cloud of smoke and possesses the ability to manifest fears and feed on them to gain a physical form. It battles the Agents of S.M.A.S.H. and attempts to invade Earth, only to be destroyed when the Agents face their fears and deny Null power.

== Numinus ==
Numinus is a cosmic entity claiming to be the guiding spirit of the universe.

== Nur ==
Nur is a character appearing in American comic books published by Marvel Comics. He first appeared in Inhuman #7 (October 2014) and was created by Charles Soule, Pepe Larraz, and Ryan Stegman.

Frank McGee was a police officer for the NYPD until a Terrigen Mist unlocked his innate Inhuman abilities, giving him the ability to emit blinding flashes from his eyes with no control over their intensity. He would later make his way to New Attilan where Medusa got him a job on the New Attilan Security Force. When Nur and Auran confront Maximus, he mind-controls Black Bolt into attacking them.

== Nyx ==
Nyx is a character appearing in American comic books published by Marvel Comics. She is based on the Greek primordial deity of the same name.

Nyx was born in the pure emptiness and was one of the Olympians who were once worshiped as gods by the Greeks, as she was worshiped as the Goddess of the Night and the Darkness. At some point, she gave birth to her children Hypnos, Oizys, and the twins Dolos and Apate. Due to her malevolent nature, Zeus imprisoned Nyx in such a manner that she would remain trapped until "the sun was parted from the earth," and hid the Night Shards within her soul in three secret places throughout the Universe.

During Avengers: No Surrender, where the Elder of the Universe, Grandmaster and the Challenger, fought each other, the Earth was removed from its orbit and it was returned at the end of the game, but its removal ended Nyx's containment. In revenge, she sought out to bring an eternal night throughout the Universe, even on planets with multiple suns and bases contained within suns. She took her revenge on the Olympians and with the help of her children, they killed all of the Olympian gods, including Zeus after retrieving information about her hidden Night Shards. However, Zeus threatened and promised to her that his son, Hercules and the "Avengers of the Wronged" would avenge him.

She was then approached by Hercules, Scarlet Witch, Vision, Hulk, Hawkeye, Rocket Raccoon, Voyager, Monica Rambeau and eventually Conan. Nyx retrieved her Shards of Night from Nightmare, Lord Librarian, and the Hyborian Age, but at the cost of her children's life. After that, with the help of the Cosmic Being, Euphoria, she arrived to her final destination in Long Island, where the One Above All's House of Ideas was. Vision made it through the door entrance of the House of Ideas to stop her from wiping out the existence. During her fight with Vision, he used the powers of the House and with his imagination, constructed many heroes to battle Nyx. She was then killed by Vision by burning her into flames, causing her to be disintegrated.

Sometime later, the global nights that was caused by Knull's and Varnae's invasions revived Nyx and restored her full power, and so she went to Antarctica where its natural darkness let her revive her children. They ambushed Hercules, Thor, and Loki, who sought them out, but they were cast into the Land Without Suns. Zeus was also imprisoned there, and the pair decided to give rise to a race of dark gods to conquer the universe. However, Hercules showed her that the plane was the domain she longed for. Nyx decided to stay there and build worlds, cities, kingdoms, and temples full of people who are lovers, and poets. She disintegrated Apate and Oizys as those worlds would not need the things they represented. She spared Hypnos so he can leave with Thor and Hercules to serve as her eyes and ears of the affairs of Gods and Heroes in the universe.
