= Master Order =

- Master Order as depicted in Marvel Two-in-One Annual #2 (1977). Art by Jim Starlin.

Publication information
- Publisher: Marvel Comics
- First appearance: Marvel Two-in-One Annual #2 (1977)
- Created by: Jim Starlin

In-story information
- Species: Cosmic entity
- Abilities: Tremendous cosmic power; Nigh-omniscience

Master Order is a character appearing in American comic books published by Marvel Comics. Created by Jim Starlin, the character first appeared in Marvel Two-In-One Annual #2 (1977). Master Order is an abstract entity. It is the cosmic counterpart of Lord Chaos and serves as the embodiment of order.

== Publication history ==
The character debuted in Marvel Two-In-One Annual #2 (1977), created by Jim Starlin. It appeared in the 2016 Ultimates 2 series.

== Fictional character biography ==
Master Order embodies order and balance in the universe and is the opposing force to "brother" entity Lord Chaos. The pair are rarely seen, but appear to manipulate events to prompt Spider-Man to solicit the Thing to join the Avengers and Adam Warlock in the first war against the Titan Thanos and defeat him. Order and Chaos were then seen observing Odin and Dormammu play a cosmic game of chess. Order and Chaos next conspired with other metaphysical and "omnipotent" beings against the Beyonder. Order and Chaos were then summoned by the Silver Surfer to regain control over their servant the In-Betweener. They imprisoned the In-Betweener for his transgressions. Order and Chaos also attend the funeral of Eon and speak with cosmic hero Quasar.

Order and Chaos participated in the congress of metaphysical and abstract beings to determine Thanos' fitness to wield the Infinity Gauntlet. They choose to join Adam Warlock and the other cosmic deities in a bid to stop Thanos. With the other abstract beings, they battled Thanos, and then battled Nebula when she obtained the Gauntlet from Thanos. The congress of abstract beings then witnessed Warlock's cosmic trial to determine his worthiness to wield the Infinity Gauntlet. Order and Chaos were next seen among a group of abstract beings questioning the Beyonder from the Dimension of Manifestations.

During the Time Runs Out storyline, the Beyonders kill Chaos, Order, the In-Betweener, and other abstract entities across the multiverse.

Order and Chaos kill the Living Tribunal and force the In-Betweener to fuse them into Logos, a new being who can take his place. However, they are eventually separated by Black Panther's astral form.

== Powers and abilities ==
Master Order is an abstract being who embodies the metaphysical concept of Order; as such it has no physical form, although on occasion it has manifested as an image of a disembodied head. It has the ability to control and manipulate time, reality, and space.

It has been implied that Order and Chaos have vast powers which they use to subtly manipulate events. It is known that, through some as yet unknown process, Order and Chaos worked together to create the metaphysical being known as the In-Betweener.

Thanos wielding the Infinity Gauntlet ranked Order's scale of power as above Galactus, but below Eternity.

== Other versions ==
Master Order and Lord Chaos battle Thanos once more in an alternate universe when he possesses the Heart of the Universe.
