= Elders of the Universe =

Comic book supervillains

- The Elders of the Universe surround Silver Surfer and Mantis on the cover of Silver Surfer vol. 3 #4 (Oct. 1987). Art by Marshall Rogers.

Publication information
- Publisher: Marvel Comics
- First appearance: Collector: The Avengers #28 (May 1966); Elders of the Universe: The Avengers #174 (Aug. 1978)
- Created by: Collector: Stan Lee (writer); Don Heck (artist); Elders of the Universe: Jim Shooter, Bill Mantlo (writers); David Wenzel (artist)

Characteristics
- Notable members: List of members

The Elders of the Universe are a group of supervillains appearing in American comic books published by Marvel Comics. The Collector was the first Elder to appear, and featured in The Avengers #28 (May 1966), but the idea that he was a member of a group known as the Elders was not introduced until The Avengers #174 (Aug. 1978).

== Fictional history ==
Each Elder of the Universe is the last survivor of an otherwise extinct race. Each discovered that they had potentially infinite lifespans, dependent on maintaining the will to live. The Elders are known for their personal obsessions (such as collecting, contests of strategy or strength, and various fields of study), each of which they pursue fanatically. While the characters are not truly cosmic entities, all have achieved some cosmic level of power and knowledge related to their particular pursuit.

The Grandmaster and his fellow Elders take an interest in Earth. The Collector has two separate encounters with the Avengers, the second ending with his murder by Korvac. The Grandmaster tricks Death into playing a contest involving many of Earth's heroes, which he deliberately loses to resurrect the Collector. The Grandmaster usurps control of Death's realm; in response, Death prevents the Elders from entering her realm, which effectively makes them immortal.

A group of eleven Elders meet on Ego the Living Planet (who is also regarded as an Elder) in an effort to kill the cosmic entity Galactus, which would cause the concepts Eternity and Death to become unbalanced and end the universe. The Elders believe since they are now immortal, they would be the only beings to survive and would be supreme beings in the new universe. The plan is thwarted by Galactus' heralds, Silver Surfer and Nova. Galactus captures and consumes five of the Elders (Champion, Collector, Gardener, Grandmaster, and Runner). Three other Elders (Astronomer, Possessor, and Trader) are sucked into a black hole and transported to another universe. The Contemplator and Obliterator avoid the wrath of Galactus and plot revenge.

The three Elders in the mystical realm conspire with the In-Betweener to restore him in exchange for being returned to their home reality. The In-Betweener attempts to kill Galactus, but discovers that he cannot do so. When he announces his intention to hurl Galactus into the black hole instead, the three Elders, who wanted to rescue the Elders from within Galactus, threaten him with the Infinity Gems to stop him. The In-Betweener responds by summoning Death and forcing her to negate them despite her vow. As a result, the Astronomer, the Trader, and the Possessor are apparently disintegrated. The ship carrying Galactus is thrown into the black hole and passes through to the mystical realm, where Master Order and Lord Chaos force the Elders within Galactus out of his body.

The five Elders who were consumed by Galactus (Champion, Collector, Gardener, Grandmaster, and Runner) are targeted by Thanos because they possess the Infinity Gems. Thanos humiliates each in turn and captures the Gems.

The Grandmaster reappears and creates a new version of the Squadron Sinister. Via the Wellspring of Power—an interdimensional source of superhuman abilities—the Grandmaster increases the powers of the Squadron Sinister, who battle the Thunderbolts. The Grandmaster is defeated by Helmut Zemo, and the Squadron Sinister scatter and escape.

After Battleworld is destroyed in "Secret Wars", the Elders examine the planet's remains, and find them to be teeming with Power Primordial in the form of an "Iso-Sphere". Their inability to come to a mutually beneficial agreement regarding ownership of the Iso-Sphere prompts the Elders into holding a winner-takes-all Contest of Champions, which all but the Grandmaster and Collector are eventually eliminated from.

During the "No Surrender" arc, it was revealed that one Elder of the Universe originally went by the name of Grandmaster before being defeated by En Dwi Gast and banished from the Earth-616 reality. After the multiverse was restored, this Elder of the Universe returned as the Challenger.

== Powers and abilities ==
Each Elder of the Universe possesses a fraction of the Power Primordial, remnants of the primordial energies of the Big Bang. The Power Primordial can be used to produce a wide range of effects, including augmentation of physical attributes (strength, durability, speed), molecular restructuring, creation of force fields, teleportation and numerous other abilities. Some Elders have incorporated this power into their singular obsessions and developed its potential in themselves (i.e. Champion, Runner) while others have to varying degrees mixed that power with tools or resources their obsessions afforded them (i.e. Contemplator, Grandmaster, Obliterator) or even largely ignored it as irrelevant or detrimental to their pursuits (i.e. Gardener, Collector).

Each Elder has developed skills related to their particular field of interest over a lifespan measured in billions of years. In their particular fields (i.e. Grandmaster in strategy, Caregiver in medicine), their powers are extremely overpowered in their particular fields.

== Members ==
- Architect – A builder and designer of constructs.
- Astronomer (Seginn Gallio) – A chronicler of stars, galaxies, and other celestial objects and events.
- Caregiver (Rubanna Lagenris Quormo) – A midwife and healer of cosmically significant entities as well as the aide of Origin.
- Carina Tivan – Daughter of the Collector who is considered an Elder of the Universe.
- Challenger – A cosmic game player and the original Grandmaster before losing the title to En Dwi Gast.
- Champion of the Universe (Tryco Slatterus) – A master of unarmed combat who seeks out new opportunities to defeat the greatest fighters of various worlds and species.
- Collector (Taneleer Tivan) – He collects artifacts and life forms (originally to protect them, now apparently for the sake of collecting itself).
- Contemplator (Tath Ki) – A philosopher who seeks to understand and explore the spiritual and mental aspects of reality.
- Ego the Living Planet – Ego worked with the Elders during their fight against Galactus. He qualifies as an Elder as he is the "last survivor" of his species in the sense that he is its only member.
- Explorer (Zamanathan Rambunazeth) – A traveler who seeks out new, obscure, or difficult to reach places and events throughout the universe.
- Father Time – A time-manipulator. His defining purpose is not explicitly stated.
- Gara – A Viscardi who confronted the Celestial Godhead after one of her species' numerous attempts at exiting her planet failed. Gara has been referred to by herself and others as an Elder of the Universe, though it is unknown if she is an actual member of the group.
- Gardener (Ord Zyonz) – He travels throughout the universe seeding worlds with plant life and biomes and shaping them to match his aesthetic ideals.
- Grandmaster (En Dwi Gast) – A cosmic game player who seeks to master, excel at, and invent ever more challenging contests of strategy.
- Judicator – A lawgiver who seeks out new, unique disputes and crimes to adjudicate, including among her fellow Elders.
- Obliterator (Maht Pacle) – A hunter obsessed with pursuing and murdering sentient life as a form of sport. He became an Elder after systematically killing every other member of his species.
- Possessor (Kamo Tharnn) – A librarian and scholar who pursues the acquisition, possession, cataloging, and dissemination of all possible knowledge.
- Profiteer – A long-hidden Elder of the Universe and the sister of En Dwi Gast whose sole ambition is the acquisition of wealth.
- Promoter (Xirena Awhina) – She is obsessed with the organization and promotion of new, unique, or cosmically epic entertainment events.
- Runner (Gilpetperdon) – A traveler and explorer focused on the freedom to see and experience the entire universe in person.
- Trader (Cort Zo Tinnus) – A master negotiator obsessed with commerce, trade, profit, and persuasion.
- Voyager (Va Nee Gast) – Daughter of the Grandmaster who is considered an Elder of the Universe.

== In other media ==
=== Television ===
- The Grandmaster appears in Fantastic Four: World's Greatest Heroes episode "Contest of Champions", voiced by French Tickner.
- The Grandmaster appears in The Super Hero Squad Show episode "Whom Continuity Would Destroy!", voiced by John O'Hurley.
- The Champion of the Universe appears in Guardians of the Galaxy, voiced by Talon Warburton.
- The Collector appears in Hulk and the Agents of S.M.A.S.H., voiced by Jeff Bennett.
- The Collector and Grandmaster appear in the Ultimate Spider-Man four-part episode "Contest of Champions", with both voiced by Jeff Bennett.
- Members of the Elders of the Universe appear in Guardians of the Galaxy (2015).
- The Collector appears in Lego Marvel Avengers: Code Red, voiced by Haley Joel Osment.

=== Marvel Cinematic Universe ===
Several Elders of the Universe appear in media set in the Marvel Cinematic Universe.

- Taneleer Tivan / The Collector appears in Thor: The Dark World (2013), Guardians of the Galaxy (2014), and Avengers: Infinity War (2018), portrayed by Benicio del Toro. An alternate timeline version of the Collector appears in the What If...? episode "What If... T'Challa Became a Star-Lord?", voiced by del Toro.
  - Carina appears in Thor: The Dark World, Guardians of the Galaxy, and What If...?, portrayed by Ophelia Lovibond. This version is a servant of the Collector.
- En Dwi Gast / The Grandmaster appears in Guardians of the Galaxy Vol. 2 and Thor: Ragnarok (2017), portrayed by Jeff Goldblum. Additionally, alternate timeline versions of the Grandmaster appear in What If...?., voiced initially by Goldblum and later by Matt Friend.

=== Video games ===
The Champion and the Promoter appear as boss characters in Marvel Tōkon: Fighting Souls. Several other Elders, including the Collector, Grandmaster, Profiteer, and Voyager, make cameo appearances.
