= Lord Chaos (Marvel Comics) =

- Lord Chaos as depicted in Marvel Two-in-One Annual #2 (September 1977). Art by Jim Starlin.

Publication information
- Publisher: Marvel Comics
- First appearance: Marvel Two-in-One Annual #2 (1977)
- Created by: Jim Starlin (writer / artist)

In-story information
- Alter ego: Lord Chaos
- Species: Abstract entity
- Notable aliases: Chaos
- Abilities: Tremendous cosmic power; Nigh-Omnipresence; Nigh-Omniscience

Lord Chaos is a character appearing in American comic books published by Marvel Comics. Created by Jim Starlin, the character first appeared in Marvel Two-In-One Annual #2 ( 1977). Lord Chaos is an abstract entity. It is the cosmic counterpart of Master Order and serves as the embodiment of chaos.

== Publication history ==
Lord Chaos debuted in Marvel Two-in-One Annual #2 (cover-dated December 1977) by writer-artist Jim Starlin, where—together with his counterpart Master Order—he tips the balance of a battle between Spider-Man, the Thing and Thanos.

The entity returned in Starlin's six-issue crossover The Infinity Gauntlet (1991), where it sided with the assembled "Cosmic entities" against Thanos. Commercial success kept Lord Chaos on the periphery of two sequels—Infinity War (1992) and Infinity Crusade (1993).

Lord Chaos then slipped into a prolonged limbo, resurfacing only for cameos until the post-Secret Wars relaunch. Al Ewing's Ultimates 2 (2016–2017) storyline re-established the character—as part of the duo "Order and Chaos"—as a direct threat: the pair murdered the Living Tribunal in Ultimates 2 #2 and were themselves fused with the In-Betweener to create the composite Logos.

In 2023, Jonathan Hickman's launched G.O.D.S.—a series intended to "redefine abstract concept characters like the Living Tribunal and the Lords of Chaos and Order"

== Fictional character biography ==
Lord Chaos is an abstract entity who embodies disarray and confusion, and the opposing force to "brother" entity Master Order. The pair are rarely seen, but appear to manipulate events to prompt Spider-Man to solicit the Thing to join the Avengers and Adam Warlock in the first war against the Titan Thanos and defeat him.

Lord Chaos and Master Order were then seen observing King of the Norse Gods Odin and master villain Dormammu play a cosmic game of chess. They next conspired with other metaphysical and "omnipotent" beings against the Beyonder. They were then summoned by the Silver Surfer to regain control over their servant the In-Betweener. Lord Chaos and Master Order imprisoned the In-Betweener for his transgressions.

They also attend the funeral of Eon and speak with cosmic hero Quasar.

Lord Chaos and Master Order participated in the congress of metaphysical and abstract beings to determine Thanos' fitness to wield the Infinity Gauntlet. They chose to join Adam Warlock and the other cosmic deities in a bid to stop Thanos. With the other abstract beings, they battled Thanos, and then battled Nebula when she obtained the Gauntlet from Thanos. The congress of abstract beings then witnessed Adam Warlock's cosmic trial to determine his worthiness to wield the Infinity Gauntlet. Lord Chaos and Master Order were next seen among a group of abstract beings questioning the Beyonder from the Dimension of Manifestations.

In Infinity Crusade it is learned that they must obey the dictates of Eternity and Infinity.

In Time Runs Out, the Beyonders kill Chaos, Order, the In-Betweener, and other abstract entities in each reality across the multiverse.

Chaos and Order kill the Living Tribunal and force the In-Betweener to fuse them into Logos, a new being who can take his place. However, they are separated by Black Panther's astral form.

== Powers and abilities ==
Lord Chaos is an abstract being who embodies the metaphysical concept of Chaos. It has no physical form, although on occasion it has manifested as a disembodied human head. It has the ability to control and manipulate time, reality, and space.

Thanos wielding the Infinity Gauntlet ranked Lord Chaos' scale of power as above that of Galactus, but below Eternity. Lord Chaos and Master Order were able to easily kill the Living Tribunal by blasting him with energy, and also defeat Galactus after transforming into Logos.

== Other versions ==
Lord Chaos and Master Order battle Thanos in an alternate universe when he possesses the Heart of the Universe.
