= Collector (character) =

Fictional character appearing in American comic books published by Marvel Comics

- Collector (bottom center) on the cover of The Avengers #119 (January 1974). Art by John Romita, Sr.

Publication information
- Publisher: Marvel Comics
- First appearance: The Avengers #28 (May 1966)
- Created by: Stan Lee; Don Heck

In-story information
- Alter ego: Taneleer Tivan
- Species: Elder of the Universe
- Team affiliations: Elders of the Universe
- Abilities: Controls the Power Primordial to create virtually unlimited effects Limited shape-shifting Precognition; Telepathy; Effective immortality Armored suit

The Collector (Taneleer Tivan) is a fictional character appearing in American comic books published by Marvel Comics. Created by writer Stan Lee and artist Don Heck, the character first appeared in The Avengers #28 (May 1966), during the Silver Age of Comic Books, and has been a recurring antagonist in various storylines over the course of the ensuing decades.

Different versions of the character have been adapted into various feature films, animated television series, video games, and other properties. In the Marvel Cinematic Universe, the character was portrayed by Benicio del Toro in the films Thor: The Dark World (2013), Guardians of the Galaxy (2014), and Avengers: Infinity War (2018), and in the Disney+ television series What If...?

== Publication history ==
The Collector first appeared in The Avengers #28 (May 1966), and was created by Stan Lee and Don Heck. The Collector made his second appearance in The Avengers #51 (April 1968) in a story titled "In the Clutches of... The Collector" where he confronted the team. He also appeared in Iron Man #26 (June 1970) during this early period, establishing his pattern of targeting various Marvel heroes beyond just the Avengers.

He returned during the Bronze Age, appearing on the cover of The Avengers #119 (Jan 1974) and continuing as a recurring antagonist to the team.

== Fictional character biography ==
Taneleer Tivan is one of the Elders of the Universe and is close to his fellow Elder En Dwi Gast (the Grandmaster). He apparently came to self-awareness billions of years ago, on the planet Cygnus X-1. He is an enormously powerful being who wielded the Power Primordial and, though at first he took the appearance of an old human, his true form is a powerful alien.

For millions of years, the Collector lived on an unknown world with his wife and child, spending his days in thought and contemplation. Over three billion years ago, when his wife, Matani Tivan, lost the will to live and relinquished her immortality, the Collector realized he would need a hobby to maintain his own sanity, and began collecting interesting artifacts and creatures from around the universe. Eventually, his obsession reached such heights he collected anything he considered rare or valuable often just for the sake of collecting. As such, he has a variety of rare or unique items at his disposal.

The Collector also had the power of prophecy, allowing him to foresee the rise of a being powerful enough to pose a threat to the Elders: Thanos. To protect life in the universe, the Collector created a massive museum of countless life forms to keep them safe from Thanos. For a time, he even possessed one of the six Infinity Gems, unaware of its true power, until Thanos took it.

At some point over his billions of years of life he came into contact with other beings who, like him, are the sole survivors of the first species in the universe. He often refers to these fellow elders as brothers though they usually only work together if they have a common goal.

In the modern era, the Collector eventually traveled to Earth. He captured the Wasp and sought to "collect" the other Avengers with help from the Beetle, but was defeated by them. He later enslaved Thor, then captured the Wasp and the other Avengers. He restored Goliath's size-change powers, but was then defeated by the Avengers again. He next compelled Iron Man to serve as his pawn against the warrior Val-Larr. He attempted to "collect" the Avengers once more, in Rutland, Vermont.

In The Incredible Hulk vol. 2, the Collector uses the previously captured Man-Thing and the Glob to capture the Hulk. After capturing the Hulk, the Collector muses on capturing the rest of the original Avengers. The Hulk escapes, freeing several of the Collector's exhibits. The newly free exhibits die from old age because they are no longer artificially preserved by the power of the Collector's ship. Man-Thing also escapes disappearing into the Swamp. The Glob remains aboard the ship and though it is not shown, it is suggested that the Glob kills the Collector. The lines from the comic book are "What the Glob wants here is quite simple: He wants the Collector's life! The Collector's anguished scream fades long before it can filter through the museum-ships long corridors. For several seconds silence reigns both within the ship and without--"

=== The Korvac Saga ===
In the 1978 storyline "The Korvac Saga", after Thanos was defeated by Earth's superheroes, the Collector foresees another major threat: Korvac, a cyborg from the 31st century. The Avengers were also aware of a new threat but did not know his identity. In an attempt to protect them, the Collector added some of them to his collection and was probably planning to enlist their aid, when a second group of Avengers appeared and defeated him in combat. After the defeat, the Collector remained in seclusion until a human named Peter Tran of Avondale summoned him to Earth.

Sensing that his end was at hand, the Collector revealed that having learned of Korvac, he had made his own daughter Carina into a spy and living weapon to use against the Machine Man, imbuing her with the Power Primordial. Just as he was about to tell the heroes who their enemy was, Michael learned of his duplicity and used his cosmic powers to blast the Collector into atoms, proving the prediction of the aged scholar's own end to be correct.

=== 1980s ===
In the 1982 miniseries Marvel Super Hero Contest of Champions, the Elder known as the Grandmaster plays a game called the Contest of Champions with Death, which resulted in Death resurrecting his fellow Elder the Collector. The Collector captured Marrina, then battled Alpha Flight and Spider-Man. He aided the Grandmaster by tricking the Avengers into entering Death's realm.

=== 1990s ===
The Collector assisted his fellow elders in a plot to kill Galactus and recreate the universe, but he was thwarted by the Silver Surfer and consumed by Galactus. Since Death had vowed that the Elders could no longer die, they caused Galactus to have "cosmic indigestion" until they were forced out of him by Master Order and Lord Chaos. The Collector was one of the four Elders who aided the Silver Surfer and Nova in helping Galactus to defeat the In-Betweener. Once the battle was over the five Elders used their Infinity Gems to instantaneously travel very far away from Galactus and his vengeance. He later gave his Infinity Gem to Thanos in exchange for the Runner, who Thanos had recently captured and de-aged. Once released from Thanos's prison, the Runner returned to his true age and began to beat the Collector up for daring to try to imprison him.

The Collector re-appeared when the Avengers fought Thane Ector and the Brethren, who were noted to have escaped from the Collector's collection. It was then noted later that the Collector had planned all of this, intending the Brethren to lay waste to the Earth so that he could "collect" the surviving humans. It was at this point he showed his true form to the Avengers and was noted to be very powerful; enough to subdue Thane Ector. The Collector was eventually thwarted by the Avengers, and the Brethren's Uni-Mind.

The Collector uses the Collection Agency and the Silver Surfer as pawns to capture a virus that caused insanity.

=== 2000s ===
In a 2007 story, the Collector becomes involved with Galactus once again when the latter entity wished to devour one of the worlds that held many of the entities the Collector had taken. Among them were the Starjammers and Wolverine.

In a 2009 story, the Grandmaster makes a bet with the Collector who sets his team of Defenders (Hulk, Doctor Strange, Namor, and the Silver Surfer) against the Grandmaster's team of Offenders (which comprises the Red Hulk, Baron Mordo, Tiger Shark, and Terrax). The game results in Hulk claiming victory and the Collector complies with the terms of the game, giving the Hulk the lifeless body of Jarella.

=== 2010s ===
Eight months after the events of the 2015 storyline "Secret Wars", the Collector is shown in charge of Battlerealm, the small surviving portion of Battleworld. He engages in a new Contest of Champions with the Grandmaster, with the prize being an ancient cosmic artifact called the Iso-Sphere.

In a 2017 story, when the hammer of the Earth-1610 Thor falls to Asgard after, and the Collector finds that he cannot lift it, he takes all of the abandoned Asgard into his possession. When Thor searches for the hammer, the Collector takes him prisoner, threatening to kill other aliens in his collection unless Thor tells him the secret of how to bypass the worthiness enchantment. He then encounters Proxima Midnight and Black Swan, who were sent by Thanos to retrieve the hammer. After Odinson, Beta Ray Bill, Odinson's pet goat Toothgnasher and the Helhound Thori escape and battle his army, the Collector tries to recapture Odinson, only for him to break free and grab the hammer. Odinson chooses not to claim the hammer, but he and Bill are able to channel its power to return Asgard to its true place, simultaneously decimating the Collector's forces, prompting him to kill his last soldier so that he can have the pleasure of destroying something unique.

== Powers and abilities ==
The Collector possesses the ability to manipulate cosmic energy for a variety of effects, including projecting concussive force beams, and the increasing of his size and mass (and hence physical strength) at will. He also possesses limited shape-changing abilities. His precognitive abilities give him brief visions of alternate future, although he must meditate for long periods to identify the individuals he sees in the vision and its apparent point in time. He has telepathic abilities that enable him to make limited contact with the minds of other Elders. Due to a vow by Death, the Collector and all the Elders cannot die and are effectively immortal.

The Collector has a vast knowledge and comprehension of the advanced science and technology of numerous alien worlds, as well as a collection of devices and artifacts from those worlds. His armored battle-suit is made of the alien metal etherion, which amplifies the wearer's strength to superhuman levels, and it has jets that permit flight. He uses various weapons from many time periods and different worlds. Among his arsenal from Earth's past are catapults, Tibetan crystal balls that emit mystical rays, and magic beans that can conjure up warrior giants. He possesses a magic lamp that can summon a four-headed djinn with mystical powers. His "boxes" are rectangular "interdimensional traps" that can weaken a victim's strength or sanity. Other weapons include gigantic robot guards, a stun beam, and stasis beams. The Collector also has zoos of alien beasts which he can release to attack his adversaries. Among this is Snake-Eyes, an enormous alien serpent with hypnotic powers. Other items in his collection include the Obedience Potion, with which the Collector can compel a human victim to do his bidding; the Cosmic Viewer, with which he can monitor events on various worlds; a Kymellian translation/control device resembling a flute, with which he can communicate with other living beings; and a time probe enabling him to find and procure artifacts from other time periods. He uses starships holding museums of his collections, a Temporal Assimilator that allows time travel, Persian "flying carpets" and a "flying cape" that allowed flight. He formerly possessed the Infinity Gem that could control reality, but he did not understand its power.

== In other media ==
=== Television ===
- The Collector appears in Hulk and the Agents of S.M.A.S.H., voiced by Jeff Bennett.
- The Collector appears in the Ultimate Spider-Man four-part episode "Contest of Champions", voiced again by Jeff Bennett. He and his older brother, the Grandmaster, hold the eponymous competition to determine the Earth's fate using the planet's heroes and villains. After noticing he lacks confidence due to a history of losing to his brother, Spider-Man helps the Collector find it by teaming up with him to fight the Grandmaster and his army of supervillains. Following the battle, the Collector chooses to retire to prevent further conflict with the Grandmaster.
- The Collector appears in Guardians of the Galaxy (2015), voiced by Tom Kenny.
- The Collector appears in Lego Marvel Avengers: Code Red (2023), voiced by Haley Joel Osment.

=== Marvel Cinematic Universe ===
Benicio del Toro as The Collector in Thor: The Dark World (2013).

Taneleer Tivan / The Collector appears in media set in the Marvel Cinematic Universe (MCU), portrayed by Benicio del Toro.

- The Collector makes a cameo appearance in the mid-credits scene of Thor: The Dark World (2013), in which Sif and Volstagg give the Aether to him for safekeeping as they feel it is too dangerous to have it near the Tesseract since both contain Infinity Stones.
- In Guardians of the Galaxy (2014), the Collector contacts Gamora with an offer to purchase an orb containing a third Infinity Stone. Once he receives it, his slave Carina tries to use it, causing a reaction that disintegrates her and destroys his gallery. In a post-credits scene, the Collector has a drink with Howard the Duck and Cosmo the Spacedog.
- An illusion of the Collector created by Thanos via the Reality Stone appears in Avengers: Infinity War (2018). While the Collector's final fate is not depicted on-screen, del Toro stated that he survived the film's events.
- An alternate timeline variant of the Collector appears in the Disney+ animated series What If...? (2021) episode "What If... T'Challa Became a Star-Lord?", voiced by del Toro. This version became a ruthless kingpin after filling a power vacuum when Thanos reformed from his genocidal ways and recruited the Black Order as bodyguards and security.

=== Video games ===
- The Collector appears in Disney Infinity 2.0, voiced again by Jeff Bennett.
- The Collector appears as a non-playable character in Marvel Contest of Champions. This version works under the Maestro to run the eponymous contest in a pocket universe called the Battlerealm.
- The Collector appears as a playable character in Lego Marvel's Avengers, voiced again by Jeff Bennett.
- The Collector appears as a playable character in Marvel Avengers Academy, voiced by Billy Kametz.
- The Collector appears in Marvel Snap.

=== Miscellaneous ===
- The Collector, based on the MCU incarnation, appears in Guardians of the Galaxy – Mission: Breakout!, portrayed again by Benicio del Toro.
- The Collector appears in The Avengers: United They Stand.
- The Collector appears in Marvel Super Hero Squad #4.
