= Grandmaster (Marvel Comics) =

Fictional character appearing in Marvel Comics

- Grandmaster (back left) on a textless variant cover of Thunderbolts #102 (July 2006). Art by Tom Grummett.

Publication information
- Publisher: Marvel Comics
- First appearance: The Avengers #69 (Oct. 1969)
- Created by: Roy Thomas (writer); Sal Buscema (artist)

In-story information
- Alter ego: En Dwi Gast
- Species: Elder of the Universe
- Team affiliations: Squadron Sinister; Elders of the Universe
- Notable aliases: The Master of Games
- Abilities: User of the Power Primordial: Immortality; Master of all games Master strategist and tactician Energy control Size and matter manipulation Ability to "will" the death and resurrection of another

The Grandmaster (En Dwi Gast) is a fictional character appearing in American comic books published by Marvel Comics. The character first appeared in The Avengers #69. The Grandmaster is one of the ageless Elders of the Universe and has mastered most civilizations' games of skill and chance. Different media appearances depict him as the Collector's brother.

Jeff Goldblum portrays the character in the Marvel Cinematic Universe film Thor: Ragnarok (2017) and in a cameo during the closing credits of Guardians of the Galaxy Vol. 2 (2017). Additionally, Goldblum voices alternate universe versions in the animated series What If...? (2021).

== Publication history ==
The Grandmaster first appeared in The Avengers #69 (Oct. 1969). The character was created by Roy Thomas and Sal Buscema.

== Fictional character biography ==
The Grandmaster is one of the Elders of the Universe and among the oldest living beings in the universe, coming from one of the first intelligent races to evolve after the Big Bang. In his first appearance, the Grandmaster plays a game against Kang the Conqueror for the power to resurrect Ravonna or destroy Kang's planet, using the Avengers and Squadron Sinister as pawns. However, Kang's efforts fail due to the intervention of Black Knight, meaning that the Avengers did not technically win their fight.

The Grandmaster challenges Death to a game of strategy, with the power to resurrect his fellow Elder the Collector as prize. The Grandmaster wins, only to learn the resurrection power could only be used if someone else died in the resurrectee's place. He chooses to sacrifice himself to resurrect the Collector.

The Grandmaster returns from beyond his grave to plague the Avengers. After he and the Collector tricked the teams into battling each other, the Grandmaster succeeded in his true plan: to capture Death and usurp her powers. He forces the Avengers to participate in a competition with the Legion of the Unliving in order to stop a series of powerful bombs, the stakes being all of creation. Captain America and Hawkeye are the only two heroes to survive; the rest of the Avengers are killed, only to instantly join the Legion. As the Grandmaster prepares to force the two to fight the Legion again, Hawkeye convinces him to lay it all on the line with one last game of pure chance. Hawkeye holds one arrow in each fist, the tips hidden in his hands. Grandmaster would win if he chooses the arrow containing Hawkeye's last arrowhead. Hawkeye's distraction allows Death to escape her bonds and banish the Grandmaster and the other Elders from her realm, making him effectively immortal.

Grandmaster and the Elders conspire to kill Galactus and restart the universe; they feel that being banned from Death's realm would make them the sole survivors to continue their obsessions in a new universe. Grandmaster and four of the Elders are consumed by Galactus and cause him "cosmic indigestion" from within until they are freed by Master Order and Lord Chaos.

The Grandmaster organizes the meeting of the Avengers and the Justice League in an attempt to save the universe from Krona when Krona seeks answers about the origin of creation. In an attempt to save his universe, Grandmaster challenged Krona to a game for the identity of a being in the Marvel Universe who had lived through the Big Bang by pitting the Avengers and the JLA against each other in a 'scavenger hunt' for twelve items of power. After losing the hunt, Krona intends to destroy both the Marvel and DC Universe and learn their secrets. The Phantom Stranger guides the two teams to the Grandmaster, who shows them the truth of reality, then dies. The Grandmaster is resurrected when reality returns to normal.

The Grandmaster recreates the Squadron Sinister, with new incarnations of members Doctor Spectrum and Hyperion, to contend against Helmut Zemo's Thunderbolts. He has been using this Squadron to destroy several sources of extra-dimensional energy, known collectively as the "Universal Wellspring", apparently to prevent Zemo from controlling them. The Grandmaster is dispersed by Zemo in a battle for the final Wellspring. He is later restored, only to be shot and killed by Zemo after having his powers taken away.

The Grandmaster returns, promising the Hulk the revival of his long-lost love Jarella if he participates in a battle to the death with a team of his choice. The Hulk chooses Doctor Strange, Namor, and the Silver Surfer, his allies in the Defenders. However, the Grandmaster takes them from different points in time (specifically, moments when their greatest loves were lost to them), and sets them against the Collector's team (Red Hulk, Baron Mordo, Tiger Shark, and Terrax). At the conclusion of the battle, the Grandmaster is apparently killed by Red Hulk.

The Grandmaster returns, with a more childish attitude. He has developed romantic feelings towards the X-Man heroine Dazzler. To that end, he stages a roller derby pitting her and two friends against dozens of super-villains.

During the "No Surrender" arc, Grandmaster forms a version of the Lethal Legion to go up against Challenger's Black Order in a contest that involves Pyramoids. It is later revealed that Voyager is Grandmaster's daughter and that he has been using her in his plans to claim the Pyramoids. Living Lightning confronts the Grandmaster and provokes him into a game of poker, with Living Lightning raising the stakes of the game to the point that the loser would have all memory of their accomplishments wiped from the memories of all who knew of them. Faced with this potential loss, the Grandmaster surrenders.

== Powers and abilities ==
The Grandmaster has been described as manipulating the so-called "power primordial", radiation left over from the Big Bang, and is one of the most powerful Elders of the Universe. He possesses a cosmic life force which renders him virtually immortal, including immunity to aging, disease, poison, and imperviousness to conventional injury through regeneration of any damage. He can survive and travel in space unaided and without food, drink, or air. He can utilize his cosmic life force for a variety of effects, including levitation, the projection of blasts of cosmic energy, teleportation across space and time and alternate dimensions, adjusting his size, control time to interact with beings moving at superhuman speed, or transformation and rearrangement of matter on a planetary scale. Perhaps his most fearsome ability is his power over life and death. The Grandmaster can "will" the death of another being. It is unknown if he can will the death of another virtual immortal being. He can also "resurrect" another being no matter how badly injured or heal a person on the verge of death. He cannot resurrect another virtually immortal being powered by "cosmic life force" like himself or anyone who has died past a certain time point. Lastly, he can temporarily bestow these powers upon another being. Currently, due to his machinations against Death, he and the other Elders cannot die.

He has a highly developed superhuman intellect, with vast knowledge and comprehension of games and game theory far beyond present-day Earth, as well as encyclopedic knowledge of thousands of exotic games played throughout the universe. He can calculate diverse low information probabilities within a tenth of a second and remember countless rules and data. He also possesses certain extra-sensory abilities of mental perception beyond those currently known which enable him to sense things about his surroundings not detectable by normal senses, and maintains a psychic link with the advanced computers of his base world, which enhance his mental abilities.

The Grandmaster has access to various exotic extraterrestrial devices as needed, including starships.

== In other media ==
=== Television ===
- The Grandmaster appears in the Fantastic Four: World's Greatest Heroes episode "Contest of Champions", voiced by French Tickner.
- The Grandmaster appears in The Super Hero Squad Show episode "Whom Continuity Would Destroy!", voiced by John O'Hurley.
- The Grandmaster appears in the Ultimate Spider-Man four-part episode "Contest of Champions", voiced by Jeff Bennett.
- The Grandmaster appears in the Guardians of the Galaxy episode "Take the Milano and Run", voiced by Jason Spisak.

=== Film ===
The Grandmaster makes a cameo appearance in Planet Hulk.

=== Marvel Cinematic Universe ===
The Grandmaster appears in media set in the Marvel Cinematic Universe (MCU), portrayed by Jeff Goldblum. This version is the ruler of the planet Sakaar who, unlike his appearance in the comics, does not have blue skin. Instead he possesses a silvery blue stripe on his chin similar to that of the Collector. According to Thor: Ragnarok director Taika Waititi, this decision was made to avoid detracting from Goldblum's personality by concealing his appearance and because Goldblum had already played a blue alien in the film Earth Girls Are Easy.

- The Grandmaster makes a cameo appearance in a mid-credits scene for Guardians of the Galaxy Vol. 2.
- The Grandmaster appears in Thor: Ragnarok. After Thor ends up on Sakaar, Valkyrie captures him and brings him to the Grandmaster, who forces him to face his "Champion", the Hulk, in gladiatorial combat. However, the Grandmaster rigs the fight when he sees Thor winning. Thor, Hulk, and Valkyrie later escape a starship after instigating a revolution amongst the gladiators. In the film's post-credits scene, the Grandmaster and his handmaidens face a group of rebels in a dumping yard and congratulates them.
- Alternate timeline versions of the Grandmaster appear in What If...?, voiced by Goldblum in the first two seasons and by Matt Friend in the episode "What If... Howard the Duck Got Hitched?".
- The Grandmaster was set to return in Thor: Love and Thunder, but his scenes were cut.

=== Video games ===
- The Grandmaster appears in Marvel Super Hero Squad: The Infinity Gauntlet, voiced again by John O'Hurley.
- The Grandmaster appears in Marvel Super Heroes 3D: Grandmaster's Challenge.
- The Grandmaster appears as a playable character in Lego Marvel's Avengers.
- The Grandmaster was announced as a playable character for Marvel: Future Fight, but was not released in the associated update.
- The Grandmaster appears as a non-playable character in Marvel Contest of Champions.
- The Grandmaster appears in Marvel Snap.
