= Nebula (character) =

Marvel Comics fictional character

- Nebula as depicted in Nebula #1 (February 2020). Art by Jen Bartel.

Publication information
- Publisher: Marvel Comics
- First appearance: The Avengers #257 (July 1985)
- Created by: Roger Stern; John Buscema

In-story information
- Species: Luphomoid
- Team affiliations: Guardians of the Galaxy; Dark Guardians; Graces; United Front
- Notable aliases: Captain Nebula; Ms. Peale
- Abilities: Superhuman strength, agility and durability; Regeneration; Tactical expertise; Skilled hand-to-hand combatant; Master assassin; Weapons specialist; Energy blasts via Wrist blasters; Bionic enhancement; Accelerated probability

Nebula is a character appearing in American comic books published by Marvel Comics. Created by Roger Stern and John Buscema, the character first appeared in The Avengers #257 (July 1985). Originally depicted as a supervillain, Nebula was later depicted as an antihero and member of the Guardians of the Galaxy.

Nebula has appeared in various adaptations of the character in other media, including animated television series and video games. Karen Gillan portrayed the character in the Marvel Cinematic Universe films Guardians of the Galaxy (2014), Guardians of the Galaxy Vol. 2 (2017), Avengers: Infinity War (2018), Avengers: Endgame (2019), Thor: Love and Thunder (2022), The Guardians of the Galaxy Holiday Special (2022) and Guardians of the Galaxy Vol. 3 (2023) in addition to voicing alternate timeline versions in the Disney+ animated series What If...? (2021).

== Publication history ==
Nebula was created by writer Roger Stern and artist John Buscema, and first appeared in The Avengers #257 (July 1985).

In the 2016 series Gamora, it is revealed that Nebula was raised alongside Gamora by Thanos, a retcon inspired by the character's depiction in the Marvel Cinematic Universe.

== Fictional character biography ==
Nebula on the cover of The Avengers #318 (June 1990). Art by Paul Ryan and Tom Palmer.

A brutal space pirate and mercenary, Nebula seizes control of Sanctuary II, a massive spaceship previously under the command of Thanos. Thanos is believed to be dead at this point, and Nebula claims to be his granddaughter.

Nebula schemes to gain absolute power by using Earth scientist Dr. Harker's atomic compressor to release vast amounts of energy that were absorbed by the Infinity Union. This attempt nearly destroys the universe by causing a second Big Bang. Captain America, Iron Man, Thor, Spider-Man and Sersi are able to escape the destruction and shut down the equipment in time to negate the unmaking of existence. Sersi removes Nebula's brain implant, depriving her of her powers.

After Thanos is resurrected, he becomes offended by Nebula's claims of kinship. He reclaims his ship and uses the Infinity Gems to nearly kill Nebula, leaving her in a disfigured, zombie-like state. When he claims the Infinity Gauntlet, Thanos boasts that Nebula is his greatest creation, being in a state between life and death. When Thanos defeats Eternity and takes his place, he expands his consciousness into the universe, leaving his body comatose. Nebula takes the Gauntlet from Thanos and uses it to heal herself and banish Thanos. Thanos agrees to help the heroes of Earth defeat Nebula.

Nebula in interior artwork from Nova: The Human Rocket #1 (May 1999). Art by Joe Bennett.

The group confronts Nebula, who is tricked into undoing the events of Thanos' godhood and destructive acts. The Cosmic Pantheon (which Thanos had earlier defeated) immediately appears and confronts Nebula. With Nebula distracted, the Surfer and Warlock steal the Gauntlet by disrupting the unity between the Infinity Gems. Nebula is captured by Starfox and returned to Titan for trial, while Warlock takes the Gauntlet.

Nebula is later confronted by Firelord in the Titanian prison, where the murder of her abusive father was depicted in a flashback, which left her in a catatonic state. Nebula is freed from prison by her lieutenant Geatar and converted into a cyborg by Doctor Mandibus.

When next seen after escaping imprisonment, Nebula is working as a showgirl on the planet Syllogonia. When she spots the Silver Surfer and the cosmic hero Genis-Vell there, she fears being discovered and tries to flee. After revealing her true identity to Genis-Vell, Nebula immediately attacks him. The Surfer dismantles Nebula's firearm before transmuting her armor into a binding shell to incapacitate her.

Nebula escapes prison and gathers an army to attack Thanos's home planet, Titan. The Surfer comes to his old Defenders compatriot, Doctor Strange, seeking aid in stopping the advancement of her recruitment drive. Nebula knocks the Surfer out with a synaptic disruptor, then straps him to a bomb to be sent to Titan's surface. War Machine disables the bomb and frees the Silver Surfer, who returns to Nebula's vessel and deals with her shortly afterward.

=== Thanos vol. 2 ===
Having been incensed that the Collector chose a second ring crew of transporters to ferry sensitive goods over her, Nebula drops out of hyperspace to steal their cargo with a new artificially intelligent ship to aid her thievery. During the middle of the heist, she is found by her grand uncle Eros (Starfox), aided by another Elder: Tryco Slatterus, the Champion. To her surprise, she finds that this group meeting was set up by Thanos's son Thane, who had arranged it for the purpose of killing his father. Nebula is skeptical until she hears Thane's argument, in which he states they need a special kind of contraband to do the deed. Their goal is to steal precious intel by releasing a special prisoner in Terrax's gulag, a mercenary who knows a special backdoor entrance into Thanos's old fortress, the Black Quadrant.

While Starfox distracts Nebula, Tryco and Thane make their way to the ship's brig to ascertain their prize. Much to Tryco and Nebula's horror, they find a Phoenix Egg instead of a prisoner. In her shortsighted anger at such deceptions, Nebula shoots Thane dead. Soon afterward, Thane is resurrected and possessed by the Phoenix Force.

Tryco and Nebula are dragged into the realm of the Stygian Witches and reawaken in the God Quarry. The two battle Thane, who is trapped in the quarry. Thanos turns his attention to his compatriots, only to rebuke them and leave them stranded in the witches' domain with no way out.

=== Asgardians of the Galaxy ===
While trapped in the witches' domain, Nebula partakes in the witches' challenge and sets foot within the Quarry herself. Coming out of her own desired fulfillment, she would emerge from the petrification effect now capable of surviving the airless environment of the elderly watchers abode. Eager to vacate the premise, Nebula is dismayed to find that Gamora has killed Thanos in her absence. The Cosmic Coven informs her that there is another way for her acquire that which she truly desires, assuming she follows in the footsteps of her rival in getting it. Following the Three-as-One's advice, Nebula sets out to capture a dwarven enclave to coerce one of their master blacksmiths into both making for her a mighty cleaver through which she can shorten distances across the universe and refurbish an artifact of biblical proportions through which she can regain her title as deadliest woman in the galaxy.

Nebula attempts to claim the Naglefar Beacon, a device with which to call forth the divine cadavers boarding an armada of Norse ferries catered to the apocalyptic horns blow. After a brief skirmish with the Asgardians of the Galaxy, Nebula is finally bested when the beacon is taken off her hands and she is trapped in an illusion of losing to Gamora. After her Dwarf thrall fixes her war hatchet, Nebula teleports away, not realizing its warp capabilities have been tampered with.

=== Working with the Dark Guardians ===
In the aftermath of the "Infinity Wars" storyline, Nebula attends Thanos' funeral. Starfox shows all the guests a recording of Thanos stating that he uploaded his consciousness into a new body before his death. The funeral is attacked by the Black Order, who steal Thanos's body. Everyone is saved by the arrival of Gladiator and the Shi'ar, with Nebula joining Starfox's Dark Guardians.

== Powers and abilities ==
Nebula is an athletic woman, and an excellent armed and unarmed combatant. She possesses a gifted intellect and is a skilled battle strategist.

Nebula uses blasters worn on her wrists that fire concussive blasts of unknown energy or heat blasts that can incinerate a human being almost instantly.

Nebula briefly possessed the Infinity Union, a combination of three devices that together could channel all forms of ambient energy into her, infusing her with vast power. This enabled her to manipulate her size, teleport, manipulate matter, and project her consciousness as pure energy. She also briefly possessed the Infinity Gauntlet and the Infinity Gems, which enabled her to manipulate the fundamental forces of the universe.

Nebula was later converted by Doctor Mandibus into a cyborg. Her bionic left arm can stretch to nearly twice its length and has a potent energy cannon in the palm. Nebula's optic receiver had been augmented with the addition of an accelerated probability generator implanted into her systems, giving her detailed understanding and analyzing of variables.

In Asgardians of the Galaxy, Nebula gains the ability to survive in the vacuum of space after completing the God Quarry's trial. She also obtains an axe created by the dwarf Urzuul that enables her to teleport and the Naglefar Beacon, a horn that controls the ships of the dead.

== Reception ==
=== Accolades ===
- In 2020, Scary Mommy included Nebula in their "Looking For A Role Model? These 195+ Marvel Female Characters Are Truly Heroic" list.
- In 2022, Comic Book Resources (CBR) ranked Nebula 4th in their "Thanos' Most Powerful Children" list.

== In other media ==
=== Television ===
- Nebula appears in the Silver Surfer episode "Learning Curve", voiced by Jennifer Dale.
- Nebula appears in The Super Hero Squad Show, voiced by Jane Lynch. This version is Thanos' older sister.
- Nebula, based on the Marvel Cinematic Universe (MCU) incarnation, appears in Guardians of the Galaxy (2015), voiced by Cree Summer. Following Ronan the Accuser's death, she competes with Korath the Pursuer and Gamora to fill the resulting power vacuum, during which Nebula obtains Ronan's Universal Weapon. Nebula later resurrects Ronan using the energy of the living moon Mandala and a special seed.
- Nebula appears in Marvel Super Hero Adventures, voiced by Diana Kaarina.
- Nebula appears in Lego Marvel Super Heroes – Guardians of the Galaxy: The Thanos Threat, voiced again by Cree Summer.
- Nebula appears in Lego Marvel Avengers: Loki in Training, voiced by Ashleigh Ball.

=== Marvel Cinematic Universe ===
Karen Gillan portrays Nebula in media set in the Marvel Cinematic Universe. This version is one of several adopted children raised by Thanos alongside her adopted sister Gamora, with whom she developed a rivalry. Over time, Nebula developed an obsessive need to best Gamora in combat, but every time she lost, Thanos subjected her to torturous mutilation, replacing parts of her body with cybernetic enhancements. This imbued Nebula with a deep hatred toward Thanos as well as resentment towards Gamora for not treating her like a sister. Throughout the films Guardians of the Galaxy (2014), Guardians of the Galaxy Vol. 2, Avengers: Infinity War, Avengers: Endgame, and Guardians of the Galaxy Vol. 3, Nebula reconciles with Gamora, becomes a member of the Guardians of the Galaxy, and from the Blip becomes a member of the Avengers, eventually defeating Thanos after 5 years. She then rejoins the Guardians.

Additionally, Gillan voices alternate timeline versions of Nebula in the animated series What If...?, and reprises her role in The Guardians of the Galaxy Holiday Special.

=== Video games ===
- Nebula appears as a boss in Marvel Super Heroes: War of the Gems.
- Nebula appears in Marvel Super Hero Squad: The Infinity Gauntlet, voiced again by Jane Lynch.
- Nebula appears in Marvel Avengers Alliance.
- Nebula appears as a playable character in Marvel: Future Fight.
- Nebula appears in Marvel Avengers Academy, voiced by Linnea Sage.
- Nebula appears as an unlockable playable character in Lego Marvel's Avengers.
- Nebula appears in Guardians of the Galaxy: The Telltale Series, voiced by Ashly Burch. Following Thanos' death in episode one, Gamora tells Star-Lord that part of her wants to see Nebula again. Depending on the player's choices, he will either tell her that Nebula is family or that calling her could be a mistake. If the former choice is made, Nebula expresses anger over how the Guardians killed Thanos during Gamora's call. In episode two, Nebula attacks the location where Thanos' body is being held, though Star-Lord and Gamora subdue her and lock her in Gamora's room on their starship, the Milano. Star-Lord and Gamora later come to her for help in translating ancient Kree glyphs he saw in a vision, but Nebula proves reluctant. After Drax discovers a device in Nebula's head, Star-Lord persuades her to give it to him. When Kree soldiers working for Hala the Accuser attack the ship, Star-Lord will have the option to release Nebula to help fight them. In episode three, Star-Lord experiences Gamora's flashbacks of Nebula while she was being trained by Thanos before deciding whether Nebula stays or goes. Depending on the choice, Nebula will either reconcile with Gamora or join Hala's forces respectively.
- Nebula appears as a playable character in Marvel: Contest of Champions.
- Nebula appears as a playable character in Lego Marvel Super Heroes 2, voiced by Arina Ii.
- Nebula appears as a boss in Marvel Ultimate Alliance 3: The Black Order, voiced again by Ashly Burch.
- Nebula appears as a boss in Marvel Future Revolution.
- Nebula appears in Marvel Snap.
