= Stranger (Marvel Comics) =

Marvel Comics fictional character

The Stranger
- The Stranger as depicted in Fantasy Masterpieces #5 (April 1980). Art by John Buscema.

Publication information
- Publisher: Marvel Comics
- First appearance: Uncanny X-Men #11 (May 1965)
- Created by: Stan Lee; Jack Kirby

In-story information
- Abilities: Immortality; Wields the Power Cosmic

The Stranger is a character appearing in American comic books published by Marvel Comics. The character is a cosmic entity and principally a scientist and surveyor of worlds, first visiting Earth out of curiosity.

== Publication history ==
The Stranger first appeared in X-Men #11 (May 1965) and was created by Stan Lee and Jack Kirby.

== Fictional character biography ==
The Stranger is a cosmic entity who arrived on Earth for research purposes. After an encounter with the X-Men and Brotherhood of Mutants, the Stranger departs, taking Magneto and Toad with him for study. Magneto escapes and returns to Earth, leaving Toad behind.

The Stranger reappears in the title Tales to Astonish, becoming convinced that mankind is dangerous and intending to destroy Earth using the Hulk. However, he is dissuaded by Hulk's alter ego, Bruce Banner. The Stranger takes the supervillain Abomination into space with him, believing him to be truly evil. In the title Silver Surfer, the Stranger again attempts to destroy the Earth, on this occasion using a powerful "Null-Life" bomb. After a battle with the Silver Surfer and learning that a human scientist sacrificed himself to defuse the bomb, the Stranger retreats.

In the title Fantastic Four the Stranger aids the superhero team against the entity the Overmind, and watches as Thor battles the Abomination. The title The Avengers features a story in which Toad impersonates the Stranger and battles the superhero team. The true Stranger encounters the Kree warrior Captain Marvel in the title of the same name, and in Marvel Team-Up encounters the hero Spider-Man when trying to obtain the Soul Gem from Adam Warlock.

The Stranger assists the Avengers in battle against Nebula, who has acquired the "Infinity Union", a device that allows the user to absorb all forms of ambient energy, and who seeks to acquire more by repeatedly destroying and recreating the universe.

In the title Quasar, cosmic beings known as the Watchers approach the Stranger for aid in halting a lethal information virus, with the hero Quasar taking advantage of the distraction to free many of the specimens on the Stranger's Labworld.

In the limited series X-Men Forever, the Stranger is revealed to have subtly manipulated and accelerated the evolution of mutants in a plot to harness their potential to gain control of all higher cosmic entities.

The Stranger prominently features in the limited series Beyond!. Posing as the Beyonder, he captures several heroes and villains and forces them into battle for the purpose of study.

== Powers and abilities ==
The Stranger possesses the ability to channel and manipulate cosmic power on a scale comparable to that of Galactus and the Celestials, with feats including levitation; force field creation; size shifting and molecular manipulation of matter; light speed space travel; intangibility and energy projection; and assembling a planet from segments of inhabited worlds from across the universe. The entity also possesses a "laboratory" world, where items are stored, and beings of interest, referred to as specimens, are kept prisoner for study.

== In other media ==
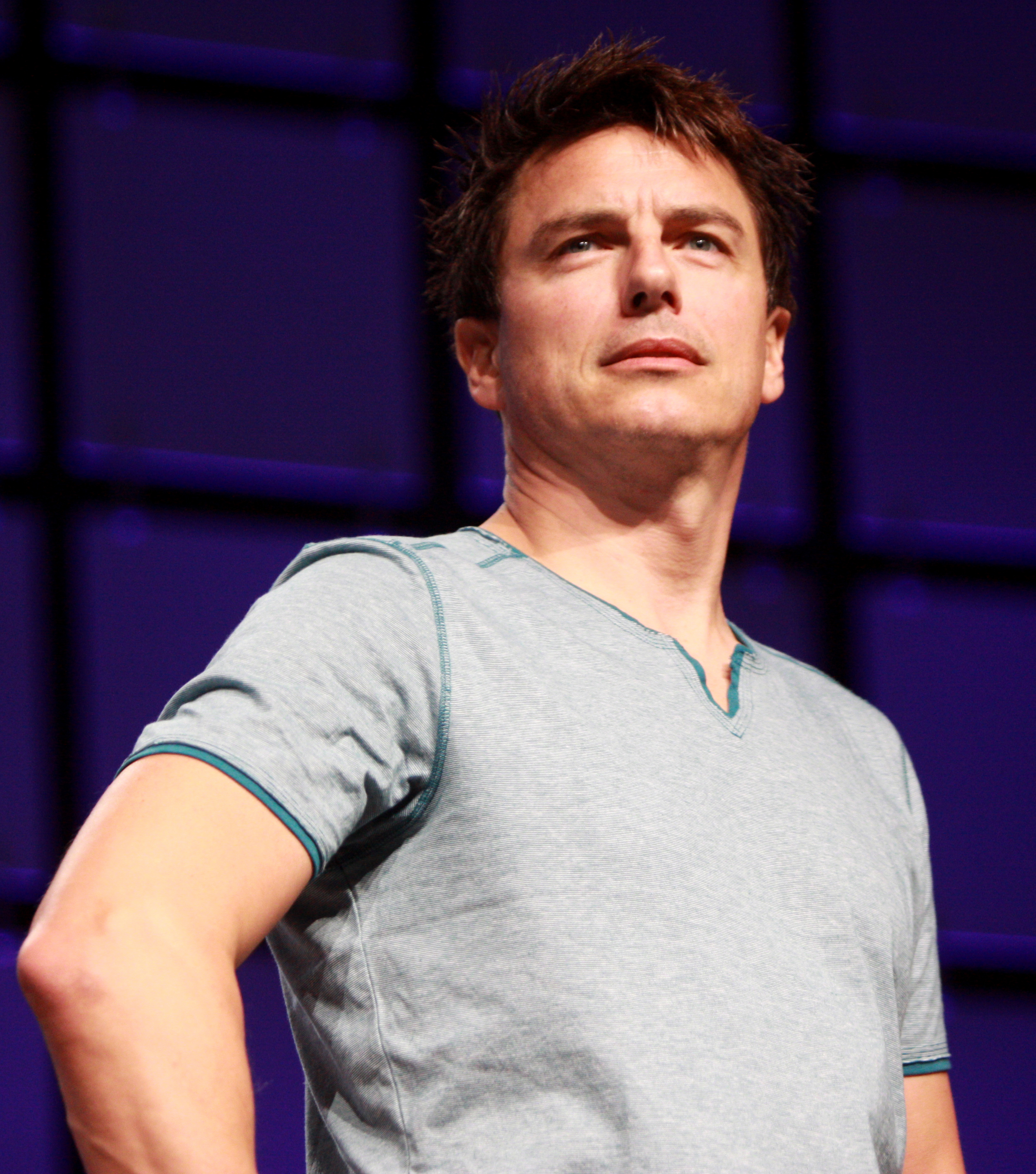
Actor John Barrowman voices The Stranger in The Super Hero Squad Show.

The Stranger appears in The Super Hero Squad Show episode "The Ballad of Beta Ray Bill! (Six Against Infinity, Part 1)", voiced by John Barrowman.
