= Living Tribunal =

Marvel Comics fictional character

- The Living Tribunal, as depicted in Silver Surfer #31 (December 1989). Art by Ron Lim

Publication information
- Publisher: Marvel Comics
- First appearance: Strange Tales #157 (June 1967)
- Created by: Stan Lee; Marie Severin; Herb Trimpe

In-story information
- Species: Cosmic Entity
- Abilities: Reality warping Near omniscience

The Living Tribunal is a cosmic entity appearing in American comic books published by Marvel Comics. The character first appeared in Strange Tales #157 (June 1967) and was created by Stan Lee, Marie Severin, and Herb Trimpe.

== Publication history ==
The Living Tribunal debuted in a storyline called "The Sands of Death" in Strange Tales #157–163 (June–December 1967), giving mystic hero Doctor Strange a limited time to prove Earth is worth saving. Established as apparently the supreme power in the Marvel Universe, the character made several sporadic appearances over the years, including What If #32 (April 1982); Rom #41 (April 1983) and Secret Wars II #6 (December 1985). The Living Tribunal revealed clues as to its true purpose and nature in Silver Surfer (vol. 3) #31 (December 1989).

After brief appearances in the role of observer in Guardians of the Galaxy #16 (September 1991) and Quasar #26 (Sept. 1991), the character had a significant role in the limited series The Infinity Gauntlet #1–6 (July–December 1991), Warlock and the Infinity Watch #1 (February 1992), and DC vs. Marvel #1–4 (April–May 1996). The Living Tribunal's role was eventually expanded on in She-Hulk (vol. 2) #12 (November 2006).

The Living Tribunal was featured in the 2003's Marvel: The End storyline. The character also made an appearance during the New Avengers storyline "Time Runs Out", and battled the Beyonders.

== Fictional character biography ==
The Living Tribunal is an entity that oversees and maintains balance in the realities that constitute the Marvel Comics Multiverse, including the mainstream universe and all alternate universes. He serves as a judge of these realities.

The character is first encountered by Doctor Strange, and it announces its intent to destroy Earth due to its potential for evil. After a series of trials, Doctor Strange is able to convince the Living Tribunal that good also exists, and Earth is spared. The Tribunal reappears to the Galadorian spaceknight Rom; appears briefly with the rest of the cosmic hierarchy when in discussion with the entity the Beyonder; and reveals to the former Herald of Galactus (the Silver Surfer) that its three faces represent "Equity" (hooded face), "Vengeance" (partially shrouded face), and "Necessity" (fully shrouded face). The fourth side of the Living Tribunal's head is a void, with the entity claiming that this could have been the face of the cosmic entity known as the Stranger. The character also witnesses the triumph of the hero Quasar—acting as the avatar of cosmic entity Infinity—over the villain Maelstrom, who acts for the entity Oblivion.

During DC vs. Marvel, the Tribunal teamed up with the Spectre to save their worlds from the two cosmic brothers' attempts to destroy one of the two multiverses. Their pact, with the help of Access, created the Amalgam multiverse by merging the two multiverses to "buy some time". As the new Amalgam multiverse was unstable, the former multiverses were restored. The struggle of "The Brothers" continues until the efforts of Batman and Captain America against them make them realize they both "Did Well", and the multiverses are spared.

The Living Tribunal's power is virtually limitless, as the entity prevents the Infinity Gems from being used in unison, although it remains subservient to a single, even higher entity referred to as "One Above All" (not to be confused with the celestial also called the One Above All). The entity has representatives called The Magistrati who dispense judgments by request on alien worlds, and chose to reveal the previously unseen face of "Necessity" to She-Hulk as a reflection of her own face, stating that the face is a "Cosmic Mirror which reminds us to always judge others as we would have ourselves judged".

Iron Man and Uatu later find what appears to be the Living Tribunal's withered corpse on the moon, with no sign of who killed it.

An alternative version of Adam Warlock took up the Living Tribunal's vacant position on orders from the One-Above-All (here called "Above-All-Others").

== Powers and abilities ==
Thanos wielding the Infinity Gauntlet ranked the Tribunal's power as the highest in Marvel's regular multiversal hierarchy. However, the Tribunal has also referred to a higher entity that vastly eclipses its own power, and was killed by the Beyonders.

The Living Tribunal was the embodiment of the Marvel Multiverse, and the sum totality of all the abstract entities within it. Nonetheless, the Tribunal is not as powerful as the multiversal incarnation of Eternity and was referred to as an internal function of the entity.

== In other media ==
- Christopher Markus and Stephen McFeely, the screenwriters of the Marvel Cinematic Universe (MCU) films Avengers: Infinity War and Avengers: Endgame, revealed that the Living Tribunal was originally planned to have an appearance in the latter, in which they would have judged Thanos for his crimes against the universe, including "The Blip".
- The Living Tribunal makes a cameo appearance in the MCU film Doctor Strange in the Multiverse of Madness.
