= Beyonders =

Fictional race in comics

- The Beyonders as seen in New Avengers (vol. 3) #29, art by Kev Walker.

Publication information
- Publisher: Marvel Comics
- First appearance: Marvel Two-in-One #63 (May 1980)
- Created by: Mark Gruenwald; Jerry Bingham

Characteristics
- Notable members: Beyonder
- Inherent abilities: Reality warping

The Beyonders are a fictional higher-dimensional race appearing in American comic books published by Marvel Comics. They live outside the multiverse and are responsible for the multiverse's destruction during Jonathan Hickman's Avengers (2012), New Avengers (2013), and Secret Wars (2015) saga.

== Publication history ==
The Beyonders were first mentioned in the team-up comic Marvel Two-in-One #63 (May 1980), by Mark Gruenwald and Jerry Bingham.

The Beyonders received an entry in the Official Handbook of the Marvel Universe Update '89 #1. They also received an entry in Secret Wars Official Guide to the Marvel Multiverse.

An initially unrelated character called the Beyonder was tied to these older characters by Steve Englehart for his "Secret Wars III" story in Fantastic Four #318–319 (September–October 1988). The Beyonder first appeared during the first Secret Wars, as a being that was stated to be the omnipotent embodiment of an entire separated multiverse. As he became self-aware, he recognized himself as the only person in his Universe. According to Englehart, an editor hated the character and ordered the Beyonder "removed" from the Marvel Universe. Englehart did as asked but has stated that he tried to exile the character with dignity. The character was retconned into a less powerful character, a self-aware Cosmic Cube inhabiting his own "dimension" because there was no matrix to hold his energy, with the explanation that other more powerful beings had exercised their powers on the Beyonder's behalf to ease his transition into self-awareness.

The Beyonders were greatly expanded upon in Al Ewing's Defenders: Beyond series. They were revealed to be the same race as the "Omegas" previously seen in Defenders (2011–2012) and briefly appeared in The Ultimates 2 (2016) #6. Their origin story was revealed and was tied to the Celestials; the "Beyond" space that they dwell was revealed to be formerly the second iteration of Cosmos and first multiverse.

== Fictional history ==
The Beyonders are a race of extra-dimensional entities that were created by the Celestials following the Celestial War which created the Second Cosmos, the first multiverse. They were originally called "Omegas" by the Celestials. After the Second Cosmos ended, the multiverse was renewed. Instead of passing on to the next incarnations of the multiverse like the Celestials, the Beyonders moved to a region outside the multiverse.

The Beyonders maintained the multiverse from the Beyond Space with the light of Concordance. The Celestials also assigned beings to maintain the multiverse from within with the power of Living Abyss. These two became known as the Kings in White (or Ivory Kings) and Kings in Black (or Onyx Kings), respectively.

For millennia, the Beyonders were not observed by any being of the Earth dimension. Thousands of years later, the Beyonders created the Fortisquians as agents to observe other worlds, including Max.

Every now and then the Beyonders would shunt a modicum of energy to the universe, allowing sentient beings to use them to create Cosmic Cubes—a practice they appear to have given up after the admonishments by Eternity and the Living Tribunal regarding the disruptive effect of these actions. One of these energy modicums would later develop sentience and take its name after its creators, the Beyonder.

=== Time Runs Out ===
In the "Time Runs Out" storyline, Hank Pym learns the incursions are being caused by the Beyonders, whom he also refers to as the Ivory Kings. Upon returning to Earth, he tells his fellow heroes that the Beyonders have killed the Living Tribunal along with all the Celestials, and every abstract entity (including Eternity, Infinity, Lord Chaos, Master Order, and the In-Betweener) as part of an experiment involving the destruction of all life throughout the Marvel multiverse.

=== Secret Wars ===
It was soon revealed that Doctor Doom's attack was a bomb made of Molecule Men he collected from throughout the multiverse, which enabled him to destroy Beyonders and channel the resulting energy into Owen Reece, and use that energy to collect what remained of the multiverse into a single planet known as Battleworld.

A number of survivors of the multiverse were also collected and brought to Battleworld, now under the reign of the now-cosmically powered "God Emperor" Doom - their memories altered to become the lords and ladies of various factions of a medieval new order. The arrival of a handful of other survivors who recalled the truth shattered this illusion. Owen Reece, the conduit for the Beyonders' power, transferred that power to Reed Richards, leading to the multiverse's recreation.

== Powers and abilities ==
All of the Beyonders have reality-warping abilities. The Beyonders have been witnessed killing nearly all of the Celestials and destroying abstract entities such as Eternity and Infinity throughout the multiverse at the same time, and three members of the race together managed to kill the Living Tribunal itself.

The Beyonders are what Doctor Doom calls "linear beings". Despite their vast powers and knowledge, they seem unable to travel forward or backward in time. They have also displayed other limitations, as an explosion strong enough to destroy a few thousand universes was sufficient to kill them.
