= Voyager (comics) =

Superhero created by Marvel Comics

- Voyager in her human disguise from The Avengers #675 (November 2018). Art by Pepe Larraz and David Curiel.

Publication information
- Publisher: Marvel Comics
- First appearance: Marvel Legacy #1 (March 2018) (cameo); Avengers #675 (November 2018)
- Created by: Mark Waid (writer); Al Ewing (writer); Jim Zub (writer); Michael Allred (artist); Laura Allred (colorist)

In-story information
- Alter ego: Va Nee Gast
- Species: Elder of the Universe
- Team affiliations: Avengers; Elders of the Universe
- Notable aliases: Valerie Vector
- Abilities: Quantum teleportation; Memory manipulation; Time travel; Flight

Voyager (Va Nee Gast), initially known by the alias Valerie Vector, is a superhero appearing in American comic books published by Marvel Comics. Created by Mark Waid, Al Ewing, Jim Zub, Michael Allred, and Laura Allred, the character first appeared in The Avengers #675 as part of the Avengers: No Surrender storyline. Voyager was presented as a "lost" founding member of the Avengers, but was subsequently revealed to be the daughter and ally of the Grandmaster, one of the Elders of the Universe, before truly defecting to the Avengers' side.

== Publication history ==
=== Concept and creation ===
The concept of a "lost founder" of the Avengers was suggested during the planning of Marvel Legacy, with writers tentatively attributing the idea to Tom Brevoort. The concept is similar to that of Triumph, a retroactively established founding member of the Justice League of America co-created by Mark Waid, one of the creators of Voyager; as a result, Waid was insistent that Voyager not be a "real" founder, not wanting to repeat his work on Triumph. The similarity between the two was alluded to in Voyager's fictional backstory, in which she claims to have been erased from history while fighting "Victory, the Electromagnetic Man", a member of the Squadron Sinister who is a pastiche of Triumph.

Voyager's powers of teleportation were suggested by Jim Zub as abilities that were not widely represented among the Avengers, as well as being useful as a plot device for the story of No Surrender. Her name was suggested both to relate to her powers and allude to the naming conventions of the Elders of the Universe; other names considered included "Legacy", "Vector", "Apex", "Transit" and "Portal Princess". Her design was created by Mike Allred and Laura Allred, and was specifically intended to fit alongside the designs of Marvel characters from the 1960s, the era which Voyager supposedly hailed from.

== Fictional character biography ==
A young Voyager and her father Grandmaster.

Va Nee Gast is the daughter of the Grandmaster and previously travelled the galaxy with him, gambling for the fates of planets. However, she came to resent her father for treating her as a playing piece in his games.

When Earth is chosen as the battleground for a contest between the Grandmaster and his brother, the Challenger, Voyager is secretly deployed as the Grandmaster's "secret weapon". She uses her ability to manipulate memories to adopt the guise of Valerie Vector, a founding member of the Avengers who was lost fighting Squadron Sinister member Victory the Electronic Man. When her identity is revealed by Vision and Edwin Jarvis, Voyager turns on her allies and claims the fifth "pyramoid" target of the contest for herself. During the Avengers' defense of their headquarters against the Hulk, Voyager is moved by their bravery and heroism, leading her to aid the Avengers in restoring Earth to its proper place and defeating the Challenger.

Voyager is offered legitimate membership in the Avengers, but declines, feeling she had not truly earned it yet and vowing to return if the Grandmaster ever threatened Earth again. Wishing to make amends for her actions, Voyager watches over the newly-imprisoned Challenger on the Far Shore of life and death, showing him the adventures of the Avengers in the hope that he would find the same inspiration in them that she did.

Voyager returns in Avengers: No Road Home after the goddess Nyx is released from her imprisonment by the contest between the Grandmaster and Challenger, causing global night to fall across the universe. Feeling responsible for Nyx's release, Voyager assembles a team of Avengers consisting of Spectrum, Vision, Scarlet Witch, Hawkeye, Hulk, Rocket Raccoon, and Hercules, but they are too late to stop Nyx from killing the Olympian gods. Voyager sends the Avengers across dimensions to stop Nyx's children from reclaiming the three shards of her power, but is captured by Nyx and enslaved by Oizys, goddess of misery.

Voyager is freed from Oizys' control when Hercules overcomes his despair and offers her his aid, crushing Oizys to death in the process and allowing the Avengers and Conan the Cimmerian to follow Nyx to the final shard on the planet Euphoria. Though Voyager is brought to the point of collapse by overuse of her powers, she manages to transport the Avengers to the House of Ideas, the dwelling place of the One-Above-All. This allows Vision to enter the House and stop Nyx from rewriting creation in her image.

== Powers and abilities ==
Voyager has the ability to create portals that teleport herself and others through time and space with no apparent limitations on distance. She was able to take the Challenger to the Far Shore, the "furthest point of life and death." She also transported the Avengers through time to the Hyborian Age. However, use of these powers repeatedly or on large numbers of people is draining on Voyager. It required her to rest before using them again. Her powers also extend to the ability to "travel" through memories. She can implant new memories and altering existing ones. Voyager is also able to fly through her quantum powers.

== Other versions ==
The fictional backstory that Voyager gave to the Avengers is true in the alternate reality of Earth-17122. On this Earth, Valerie Vector was the daughter of scientist Arthur Vector, who gained her quantum powers when she ran into the path of one of her father's experiments after hearing that her mother wanted a divorce. Voyager served as a superhero and Avenger for years until she was seemingly killed during a fight with the Squadron Sinister.

== Reception ==
=== Accolades ===
- In 2019, CBR.com ranked Voyager 9th in their "10 Best New Avengers Of The Decade" list.

== In other media ==
Voyager appears in Marvel Avengers Academy.
