= Champion of the Universe =

- The Champion of the Universe as depicted in Marvel Two-in-One (June 1982). Art by Ron Wilson.

Publication information
- Publisher: Marvel Comics
- First appearance: Marvel Two-in-One Annual #7 (1982)
- Created by: Tom DeFalco (writer); Ron Wilson (artist)

In-story information
- Alter ego: Tryco Slatterus
- Species: Elder of the Universe
- Team affiliations: Elders of the Universe
- Notable aliases: Fallen One
- Abilities: Superhuman strength, endurance, agility, reflexes, and durability Master of many fighting styles and martial arts forms

The Champion of the Universe (Tryco Slatterus) is a fictional character appearing in American comic books published by Marvel Comics. He is not necessarily a villain but has played the role in the past through his impetuous and arrogant actions.

== Publication history ==
He first appeared in Marvel Two-in-One Annual #7 (1982), and was created by Tom DeFalco and Ron Wilson.

== Fictional character biography ==
The Champion is one of the alien Elders of the Universe. He is an immortal who claims to have been born billions of years ago in the Ancrindo Nebula. Although he wishes to prove himself the greatest warrior in the universe, he usually does so fairly. He keeps himself busy by fighting powerful warriors throughout the universe. The Champion of the Universe's Promoter Supreme, Proja, recruits the superheroes Thing, Namor, Hulk, Colossus, Sasquatch, Thor, Doc Samson, and Wonder Man to a boxing match in Madison Square Garden. The other heroes are defeated or disqualified, but the Thing refuses to give up and convinces the Champion to surrender.

After gaining the Power Gem, the Champion settles on the planet Skardon, whose native Skard exist in a "might makes right" culture; all disputes, including matters of law, are settled in a trial by combat. By defeating Skardon's most powerful fighters in the natives' boxing-ring-esque arena, the Champion becomes the ruler of the planet. He is later defeated and dethroned by She-Hulk.

== Powers and abilities ==
The Champion controls an energy source referred to as the Power Primordial. This energy is apparently residual energy that is left over from the Big Bang itself. The Champion has spent countless eons channeling this energy force into the perfection of his physical form. Physically, he is the most powerful of the Elders but he is unable to channel the energy into force blasts, flight, matter manipulation, telepathy or to increase his intelligence as the other Elders can. The Champion is nigh-immortal, but is not invulnerable.

The Champion is depicted as highly skilled in hand-to-hand combat and familiar with a wide range of martial arts and fighting styles, but tends to prefer boxing.

While possessing the Power Gem, the Champion unconsciously used it to further increase his power with his rage, so that during his fight with Thanos his strength increased to the point where he destroyed the planet on which they were fighting with a single punch. He could withstand direct, point blank and consistent shots of Thanos's energy beams at full power. Thanos noted that the Champion's rampage was one of the few forces that could cause his personal force field to buckle and disengage.

== In other media ==
- The Champion of the Universe appears in Guardians of the Galaxy, voiced by Talon Warburton.
- The Champion appears as a playable character in Marvel Contest of Champions.
- The Champion appears as the final boss and a playable character in Marvel Tōkon: Fighting Souls, voiced by Tesshō Genda in Japanese and Sean Kenin Elias-Reyes in English.
