= In-Betweener =

- The In-Betweener battles Galactus in Silver Surfer (vol. 3) #18 (Dec. 1988). Art by Ron Lim.

Publication information
- Publisher: Marvel Comics
- First appearance: Warlock #9 (Oct. 1975)
- Created by: Jim Starlin (writer / artist)

In-story information
- Partnerships: Lord Chaos; Master Order
- Abilities: Immortality; Reality alteration and manipulation

The In-Betweener is a fictional character appearing in American comic books published by Marvel Comics. Created by Jim Starlin, the character first appeared in Warlock #9 (1975).

== Publication history ==
The character first appeared in Warlock (1972) #9, where he viewed Thanos as a figure disrupting the natural order. This was followed by Doctor Strange (1974) #28. He then appeared in Warlock #10 (Dec. 1975) and was created by Jim Starlin.

== Fictional character biography ==
By the In-Betweener's own admission, he represents duality itself, specifically in respect to concepts such as good and evil, reason and emotion, truth and illusion, and life and death. The In-Betweener is also an agent of the conceptual beings Master Order and Lord Chaos, although his loyalty is usually to himself rather than to them.

Adam Warlock encounters the In-Betweener, who reveals that it is destined to force Warlock to transform into his villainous future self the Magus. Warlock, however, was able to escape this fate with help from Thanos.

The In-Betweener then claims to be the power behind the plan to alter the fabric of reality orchestrated by the group of sorcerers known as the Creators, but secretly seeks to impose his own concept of balance upon the universe. After an encounter with the sorcerer Doctor Strange, the In-Betweener is imprisoned as punishment for rebelling against his masters.

The In-Betweener later attempts to supplant Galactus' role in the universe and allies with the Elders of the Universe in their plan against Galactus. However, the In-Betweener betrays the Elders during a confrontation with the entity Death and compels Death to wipe three of the Elders from existence. Soon after this, the In-Betweener also battles Galactus and his robotic servant the Punisher, but the stalemated battle is interrupted by his masters, who subsequently imprison him.

During the Time Runs Out storyline, the Beyonders are revealed to have killed Master Order, Lord Chaos and the In-Betweener as part of destroying abstract entities in each reality across the multiverse. The In-Betweener is later revealed to be the mastermind behind Libra's attempt at destroying Earth, and more specifically, Starbrand.

== Powers and abilities ==
As the physical embodiment of the cosmic balance between Order and Chaos, the In-Betweener is able to manipulate cosmic energy to alter reality to achieve nearly any effect or ability within his influence as the synthesis of duality. He is, however, under the absolute control of Master Order and Lord Chaos as his creators. The In-Betweener's other major ability is to analyze a target and then direct energy towards it in a "polar opposite" form, which is instantly fatal.
