= Beyonder =

Marvel Comics fictional character

The Beyonder
- The Beyonder taken from the variant cover of Defenders: Beyond #1 (July 2022). Art by Ron Lim

Publication information
- Publisher: Marvel Comics
- First appearance: Cameo appearance: Secret Wars #1 (May 1984); Full appearance: Secret Wars II #2 (May 1985)
- Created by: Jim Shooter; Mike Zeck

In-story information
- Species: Beyonders
- Place of origin: Beyond-Realm
- Team affiliations: Beyonders; Omega Council
- Notable aliases: Frank; Kosmos; The Maker; The One from Beyond
- Abilities: Reality warping; Nigh-omnipotence

The Beyonder (/biˈɒndər/) is a fictional cosmic entity appearing in American comic books published by Marvel Comics. Created by writer Jim Shooter and artist Mike Zeck, the Beyonder first appeared in Secret Wars #1 (May 1984) as an unseen, nigh-omnipotent entity from outside the multiverse who kidnapped the heroes and villains of the Marvel Universe to have them do battle on Battleworld, a fictional planet created by the Beyonder. The character plays a more antagonistic role in the 1985 sequel, Secret Wars II, in which he takes human form to learn about desire but threatens to destroy the multiverse out of increasing frustration.

Following Secret Wars and Secret Wars II, the Beyonder experienced many notable retcons. At first, he was changed to a Cosmic Cube that was incomplete because of the Molecule Man. The Illuminati suggested he was a mutant-Inhuman hybrid. Finally, he is revealed to be a "child" of the Beyonder race.

== Publication history ==
Created by writer Jim Shooter and artist Mike Zeck, the Beyonder first appeared in Secret Wars #1, as an unseen, apparently nearly omnipotent being. He reappears in Secret Wars II #1 (July 1985), which was written by Shooter and drawn by Al Milgrom.

== Fictional character biography ==
=== Secret Wars ===
The Beyonder is the manifestation of the "Beyond-Realm", which exists separately from the multiverse. This dimension was accidentally accessed by lab technician Owen Reece; some of the energy from the dimension escapes and imbues Reece with infinite powers, which he wields as the villainous Molecule Man, and the remaining energy gains sentience and becomes the Beyonder. The Beyonder creates a planet called Battleworld out of pieces of various planets, then abducts a number of superheroes and supervillains from Earth and forces them to fight each other so that he can observe the never-ending battle between good and evil.

=== Secret Wars II ===
Intrigued by what he has witnessed during the first Secret Wars, the Beyonder comes to Earth during the Secret Wars II story line to observe humanity firsthand.

After learning of the importance of money from Luke Cage, the Beyonder turns a building into pure gold, causing Spider-Man to rescue those trapped in the building, while the U.S. government works to get rid of the gold to avoid a financial crisis. The Beyonder later meets the blind superhero Daredevil and restores his sight, asking for legal representation in return. After realizing that the desire to protect his eyesight might compromise his integrity and dedication, Daredevil demands that the Beyonder take his sight away again, which he does. After becoming involved with a woman named Sharon Ing, when it is revealed that he is open to loving women and men and can also change his own gender, Beyonder attempts to get Dazzler to fall in love with him, but fails, leading to feelings of despair.

After being encouraged to find enlightenment by Doctor Strange, and failing, a frustrated Beyonder decides to destroy the entire multiverse, leading to several more battles with various Marvel superheroes, all of which end up with the Beyonder victorious. The Beyonder is finally defeated by a huge group of superheroes and killed by Molecule Man. The Beyonder's energy returns to the Beyond-Realm, where it evolves into a new universe.

=== Kosmos and the Maker ===
It is later revealed that, in the distant past, the enigmatic Beyonders created pocket universes holding vast amounts of sentient energy. Some are tapped into by various beings, including Skrulls and humans, to create reality-warping Cosmic Cubes. The Beyonder is told that he is a Cube and that Molecule Man absorbed part of his energy. The two merge and shape themselves into a Cube.

The Cube later expels the Molecule Man from its form, returning him to Earth, and evolves into the cosmic being Kosmos. Kosmos takes on a female form and is tutored by the Cosmic Cube Kubik, traveling the universe with him. When the Molecule Man's lover Volcana leaves him, he becomes angry, extracts the Beyonder from Kosmos, and attacks him until Kubik intervenes.

At some unknown point, Kosmos becomes insane and assumes a mortal form, calling itself the Maker. After the amnesiac Maker destroys a Shi'ar colony, the Imperial Guard imprison it in the Kyln. The Maker's madness takes control of several inmates but is finally subdued by Thanos and several of his allies among the prisoners. Thanos confronts the Maker and manipulates it into shutting down its own mind.

=== The Illuminati ===
In a retcon of past events, Charles Xavier and the Illuminati are revealed to have faced the Beyonder during the original Secret War. Xavier attempted to scan the Beyonder's mind and learned that he was an Inhuman-mutant hybrid, with his combined heritage giving him unprecedented power.

=== Time Runs Out ===
Hank Pym is sent by the Illuminati to investigate the Incursions and the collapsing multiverse. Upon discovering the truth of the Ivory Kings, Pym returns to the Illuminati to warn them about their enemy: the Beyonders. He refers to the Beyonder from the original Secret Wars as a "child unit" of the Beyonders. The Molecule Man later reiterates the same thing while also revealing that the accident that gave him his power and the "child Beyonder" his awareness was engineered by the Beyonders.

=== Defenders ===
The Beyonder appears to the Defenders after they left the multiverse. He explains the history of the Beyonders before reluctantly joining the Defenders on their quest. Upon reaching the House of Ideas, he decides to break free from and leave the story of the One Above All, promising to return on his own terms.

== Powers and abilities ==
The Beyonder is an infinite-dimensional, or beyond-dimensional, entity and was originally portrayed as the most powerful being in the Marvel Comics multiverse, and as the be-all and end-all of the "Beyond Realm", that took human form to better understand the nature of human beings. It was stated that he possessed power millions of times greater than the entire multiverse combined, and that a regular universe was a drop of water in the ocean compared to the Beyond Realm.

The Beyonder proved capable of destroying, and recreating, the abstract entity known as Death across the multiverse, although it extremely exerted and weakened him to do so. However, even in this state, he was capable of easily sending a horde of demons back to hell with a wave of his hand.

The Beyonder also displayed certain other limits to his power. He was overwhelmed when Rachel Summers returned the enormous powers that he had bestowed upon her along with the thoughts of all the beings in the universe, to the point that he collapsed on the ground, and he was slowed down in battle against the Molecule Man. He also lost part, or all, of his power on various occasions, and stated that the Puma—when in perfect harmony with the Universe—was capable of killing him.

After his creator, Jim Shooter, left Marvel, writer-editor Tom DeFalco re-tooled the Beyonder, diminishing his power greatly: He was no longer nearly omnipotent, and several of the cosmic beings who were previously established to be below him in power were vastly upgraded in conjunction.

The Beyonder once destroyed a galaxy on a whim to meet his needs during the first Secret Wars, and later created a universe out of his own being. When the Molecule Man extracted the Beyonder from Kosmos, their battle took place in more than three spatial dimensions, and threatened to cause vast destruction across the multiverse. In Kosmos' 'Maker' incarnation, she was stated as capable of reversing The Crunch itself, essentially collapsing the universe. However, his power was stated to be significantly below the Living Tribunal and Eternity, the Celestials, and the Molecule Man.

After The Beyonder was retconned again to be a child of the race of Beyonders, and he was later seen fully grown and interacting with an assembly of them, his power was presumably upgraded to a similar scale to them, and other Beyonders have together managed to kill the Living Tribunal and all of the Celestials in the Marvel multiverse. However, it was stated that he is considerably less powerful than the multiversal Phoenix Force.

== Other versions ==
=== Guardians of the Galaxy ===
A possible future version of the Beyonder appears in Guardians of the Galaxy.

=== Heroes Reborn ===
In an alternate reality depicted in the Heroes Reborn storyline, a character named Mister Beyonder appears as an inmate of the Negative Zone.

=== Mutant X ===
In Mutant X, the Beyonder allies with Dracula to wage war on Earth's forces and confront the Goblyn Queen.

=== Spider-Ham ===
The Bee-Yonder, a funny animal version of the Beyonder from Earth-8311, appears in Peter Porker, the Spectacular Spider-Ham.

== In other media ==
- The Beyonder appears in Spider-Man: The Animated Series, voiced by Earl Boen. This version is an associate of Madame Web who helps her prepare Spider-Man for his battle against Spider-Carnage.
- The Beyonder appears in Avengers Assemble, voiced by Steven Weber. This version creates Battleworld out of other worlds as part of its experiment.
- The Beyonder appears in Moon Girl and Devil Dinosaur, voiced by Laurence Fishburne. This version possesses orange skin and a lean build.
