= Marvel: The End =

Comic book series by Marvel Comics

- Marvel: The End #1 (May 2003)

Publication information
- Publisher: Marvel Comics
- Format: Limited series
- Publication date: May - Aug. 2003
- No. of issues: 6
- Main character: Thanos

Creative team
- Written by: Jim Starlin
- Penciller: Jim Starlin
- Inker: Al Milgrom

Marvel: The End is a six-issue limited comic book series, published in 2003, by Marvel Comics. It was written and penciled by Jim Starlin and inked by Al Milgrom.

== Publishing history ==
Marvel's Executive Editor Tom Brevoort has stated on his Tumblr blog that "Marvel: The End" (and all other "The End" series) is not in any way a part of the official Marvel continuity."

== Plot summary ==
The Heart of the Universe is an energy source first discovered a millennium ago by a group of alien explorers who learned to harness its great energy. Becoming the "Celestial Order", the explorers decided to use the power to forcibly attempt to bring peace to the universe by appointing beings they deemed worthy of the Heart's power to rule sectors of the universe. The Order chose the ancient Egyptian Pharaoh Akhenaten as their agent on Earth. The power, however, corrupts Akhenaten, who arrives on present-day Earth and uses the Heart's power to conquer the world, killing most of Earth's heroes in the process. The villain Doctor Doom attempts to kill Akhenaten by traveling back in time to execute him while he was still human, but Akhenaten prevents this. The Titan Thanos, who has become aware of the Heart's power, gathers the last of the heroes, including the Defenders and Captain Marvel, in an offensive maneuver on the Order. Thanos successfully destroys the machinery that allows the Order to channel the Heart's power and then absorbs the power into himself. Using the power of the Heart, Thanos travels back in time and destroys the Celestial Order before they found the Heart of the Universe and kills Akhenaten as he attempts to prevent Doom from killing his past self.

However, contact with the Heart of the Universe allows Thanos to learn that, due to a fundamental flaw, the universe is doomed to end very soon and that this flaw could not be corrected even by the power of the Heart of the Universe.

After a while, the Living Tribunal gathers a group of the most powerful cosmic beings (including Eternity, Death, Galactus, and the Celestials) to stop Thanos. Despite their virtual omnipotence, the cosmic beings are unsuccessful, since Thanos had, by absorbing the Heart of the Universe, not simply become more powerful than when he wielded the Infinity Gauntlet—but had actually become one with everyone and everything; even the Living Tribunal had become no more than a "part" of Thanos.

Ultimately, Thanos learns that the only way for him to repair the flaw in the universe would be to destroy and re-construct it. He is finally driven to mindless rage by an attempt of the cosmic powers to usurp his reign and decides in one fateful, final moment to absorb the entirety of the multiverse back into himself so that none might ever threaten his reign again. Thanos is thus able to use the Heart's power to absorb the cosmic beings into himself—and, in doing so, he ingests the entire universe. The cosmic hero Adam Warlock, who was outside the space-time continuum when Thanos absorbed the universe, appears to Thanos and explains to him what had transpired. Adam then talks with Thanos, who decides to sacrifice himself in order to restore the universe.

Lady Death herself, with whom Thanos has long been in love, had also managed to escape. Lady Death then caresses Thanos' cheek, kisses him, then disappears into the now empty void of space while leaving Thanos awe-struck. Thanos speculates that the whole scenario was created by a higher power to fix the universal flaw. Thanos then restores the universe but wipes himself from existence, a sacrifice that is remembered only by Warlock.
