= Secret Wars II =

1985–1986 Marvel Comics limited series

- Cover to Secret Wars II #3 (Sep. 1985). Art by Al Milgrom.

Publication information
- Publisher: Marvel Comics
- Schedule: Monthly
- Format: Limited series
- Genre: Superhero
- Publication date: July 1985 – March 1986
- No. of issues: 9
- Main character(s): Beyonder, various Marvel super-heroes

Creative team
- Created by: Jim Shooter; Al Milgrom
- Written by: Jim Shooter
- Artist: Al Milgrom
- Inker: Steve Leialoha
- Colorist: Christie Scheele

Secret Wars II is a nine-issue comic book limited series and crossover published from 1985 to 1986 by Marvel Comics. The series was written by Marvel's then editor-in-chief Jim Shooter and primarily pencilled by Al Milgrom.

The series was a sequel to original series Secret Wars, published in 1984 and 1985. The series tied-in with issues of other Marvel titles, with each "tie-in" featuring a "Secret Wars II" logo in the top right hand corner to indicate that it was a part of the overall story. This was the first time Marvel published a story where the reader would have to purchase multiple titles in order to read the entire story.

== Plot ==
The entity that instigated the first Secret War, the Beyonder, visits Earth in search of enlightenment and inevitably comes into conflict with Earth's superhumans and the cosmic entities that exist in the Marvel Universe. At first, the Beyonder tries to figure out the meaning of the simple everyday tasks humans do, such as: eating, sleeping, using the bathroom, etc, then the Beyonder works for a mobster and becomes very powerful and obsessed with gadgets. The Earth's heroes are very suspicious of him and this causes the Beyonder to retreat to a lone island. Mephisto recruits an army of supervillains with boosted strength, but The Thing fights them off after he is given augmented strength as well. The Beyonder falls in love with Dazzler, and tries to start a relationship with Boom Boom, but both turn him down. It is also explained how Doctor Doom, who was killed in the "normal" timeline, was able to appear in the first Secret Wars. The Beyonder recreates Doom's body from its disintegrated particles and sends him back in time to the start of the Secret Wars, causing Doom to live them in reverse order.

The Beyonder is eventually dealt with, although the heroes also have to prevent the destruction of the planet as a consequence of his actions. Beyonder attempts to become a human while still retaining all his powers. The demon Mephisto attempts to destroy him while in this form since he is now "merely human."

A sequel in the form of a single issue revealed that the Beyonder was an evolved Cosmic Cube and evolved into a being called Kosmos.

== Tie-in issues ==
- July 1985:

Captain America #308; Iron Man #197; New Mutants #30; Uncanny X-Men #196

- Aug. 1985:

The Amazing Spider-Man #268; Fantastic Four #282; Web of Spider-Man #6

- Sept. 1985:

Avengers #260; Daredevil #223; The Incredible Hulk #312

- Oct. 1985:

Alpha Flight #28; Avengers #261; Dazzler #40; Rom #72

- Nov. 1985:

Doctor Strange #74; Fantastic Four #285; The Thing #30

- Dec. 1985:

Cloak and Dagger #4; The Micronauts: The New Voyages #16; Power Pack #18; Power Man and Iron Fist #121; Thor #363

- Jan. 1986:

Amazing Spider-Man #273; New Defenders #152; New Mutants #36; Peter Parker, The Spectacular Spider-Man #111; Uncanny X-Men #202

- Feb. 1986:

Amazing Spider-Man #274; Avengers #265; Fantastic Four #288; New Mutants #37; Uncanny X-Men #203

- March 1986:

Avengers #266

- March 1990:

Quasar #8

- Dec. 1998:

Deadpool Team Up #1

== Reception ==
John Gregory Betancourt reviewed Secret Wars II for the July 1986 issue of Amazing Stories and said that "I felt this series was something special [...] I think you might be pleasantly surprised if you haven't read any comics lately."

Secret Wars II was 1985's bestselling comic book; however, it was "one of the most despised comics of the year" in the eyes of the fan press, receiving poor reviews and making numerous "worst comics of the year" lists.

== Collected editions ==
- Secret Wars II (paperback), ISBN 9780785158301

Title	Material collected	Published date	ISBN
Secret Wars II	Secret Wars II #1-9	December 2011	978-0785158301
Marvel Super Heroes Secret Wars: Battleworld Box Set	Secret Wars II #1-9, New Mutants #30, 36-37, Captain America #308, Uncanny X-Men #196, 202-203 Iron Man #197, Web of Spider-Man #6, Amazing Spider-Man #268, 273-274, Fantastic Four #282, 285, 288, 316-319, Avengers #260-261, 265-266, Daredevil #223, Incredible Hulk #312, Alpha Flight #28, Dazzler #40, Thing #30, Doctor Strange #74, Cloak & Dagger #4, Power Pack #18, Thor #363, Power Man & Iron Fist #121, New Defenders #152, Spectacular Spider-Man #111. Also includes Marvel Super-Heroes Secret Wars, Marvel Super-Heroes Secret Wars: To Battleworld and Back, Thing: Battleworld, Marvel Super-Heroes Secret Wars Aftermath, Secret War, Beyond the Secret Wars and Marvel Super-Heroes Secret Wars: Behind the Scenes.	June 2015	978-0785197515
