= Eternity (Marvel Comics) =

Fictional character by Marvel Comics

- Eternity as featured in JLA/Avengers #1 (September 2003); Art by George Pérez

Publication information
- Publisher: Marvel Comics
- First appearance: Strange Tales #138 (November 1965)
- Created by: Stan Lee (writer); Steve Ditko (artist)

In-story information
- Species: Abstract entity
- Notable aliases: The Living Embodiment of the Universe; The Living Sentience of the Cosmos
- Abilities: Vast cosmic powers; Cosmic entity physiology: Immortality; Near-Omnipotence; Near-Omniscience

Eternity is a fictional cosmic entity appearing in American comic books published by Marvel Comics. He is the embodiment of time and shares the role of embodying the universe with his sister, Infinity. Created by scripter-editor Stan Lee and artist-plotter Steve Ditko, the character is first mentioned in Strange Tales #134 (July 1965) and first appears in Strange Tales #138 (Nov. 1965).

Debuting in the Silver Age of Comic Books, the character has appeared in five decades of Marvel continuity and appeared in associated Marvel merchandise including animated television series, films, trading cards, and video games.

Eternity appeared in the Marvel Cinematic Universe film Thor: Love and Thunder (2022).

== Publication history ==
Eternity debuted in an epic 17-issue storyline dubbed "The Eternity Saga", which occurred in the ongoing feature "Doctor Strange" in Strange Tales #130–146 (March 1965–July 1966). The character was first mentioned in the 10-page story "Earth Be My Battleground" in Strange Tales #134 (July 1965), and first seen in the 10-page story "If Eternity Should Fail" in Strange Tales #138 (Nov. 1965).

Following the publication's retitling as Doctor Strange, the character returned in issues #180–182 (May–July 1969), and thereafter continued to appear in stories that were cosmic in scope, including in Doctor Strange vol. 2 #10–13 (Oct. 1974–April 1975); The Defenders #92 (Feb. 1981); and a story by writer-artist John Byrne in Fantastic Four #262 (Jan. 1984) that attracted controversy. At the conclusion of that story, Eternity validated the existence of another cosmic character, Galactus. Howard University Professor of Literature Marc Singer stated Byrne used the character Eternity as a means to "justify planetary-scale genocide".

Eternity guest starred in Secret Wars II #6–7 (Dec. 1984–Jan. 1985); Silver Surfer vol. 3 #6 & 10 (Dec. 1987, April 1988) and with Marvel's cosmic hierarchy in the limited series The Infinity Gauntlet #1–6 (July–Dec. 1991), and in its sequel, The Infinity War #1–6 (June–Nov. 1992). The character played a pivotal role in limited series Avengers Infinity #1–4 (Sept.–Dec. 2000). Major revelations about the character appeared in a storyline in Quasar #19–25 (Feb.–Aug. 1991). Other appearances, again in storylines that featured a cosmic theme, included Infinity Abyss #1–6 (Aug.–Oct. 2002); and Defenders vol. 3, #1–5 (Sept. 2005–Jan. 2006).

Eternity has also appeared in the alternate universe titles What If? #32 (April 1982), Marvel: The End #1–6 (May 2003–Aug. 2003), and JLA/Avengers #1–4 (Sept. 2003–May 2004). Eternity's origin, along with the birth of the Marvel Multiverse, was finally revealed in The Ultimates 2 #6 (2017). He returned in 2019's Doctor Strange story arc "Herald Supreme".

== Fictional character biography ==
Eternity, along with his twin sister Infinity, were born with the Big Bang. When separated, Eternity is the embodiment of time, while Infinity is the embodiment of space. Eternity and Infinity embody the Seventh Cosmos (and later Eighth Cosmos), the current version of the multiverse created in a cycle sparked by the Celestials.

The first recorded human contact with Eternity is by Doctor Strange, who seeks the entity out when his master the Ancient One is attacked by former pupil Baron Mordo. After a series of battles with Mordo and his minions, and discovering that arch-foe Dormammu is secretly backing Mordo, Strange finds and speaks with Eternity. The entity advises Strange that he is capable of defeating his foes without aid. Strange wins a duel with Dormammu (who is ultimately defeated by Eternity) and thwarts an attempted sabotage in his Sanctum Sanctorum.

On New Year's Eve, Eternity is kidnapped by Doctor Strange's foe Nightmare, who after causing time distortions that allow beings such as dinosaurs and barbarians to appear in New York City, appears before Strange and Clea. Nightmare challenges the mystic to attempt to rescue Eternity, and after accepting, Strange enters Nightmare's Dream World. After an extended series of battles and a temporary defeat, Strange recruits the Juggernaut to stop Nightmare from merging his realm with Earth, and together they free Eternity. The entity then banishes Nightmare while Doctor Strange and the Juggernaut restore reality.

Eternity is also summoned to the trial of Fantastic Four member Mister Fantastic, who is accused of saving the life of fellow cosmic entity Galactus. Eternity allows all present to momentarily possess "cosmic awareness", thereby allowing them to understand that Galactus is a vital part of the universe, despite the continued extinction of entire species.

Together with the cosmic hierarchy Eternity opposes Thanos when the villain wields the Infinity Gauntlet, although they are all eventually defeated. Once Thanos is eventually dispatched (courtesy of his own carelessness), Eternity unsuccessfully advises the Living Tribunal against allowing the Infinity Gems to be used in conjunction. Eternity develops animosity towards the artificial being Adam Warlock, whom the entity encounters on several occasions.

Eternity is one of the last beings (together with the Living Tribunal and Infinity) to be overcome by Thanos when he uses the Heart of the Universe to undo the universe and then remake it minus a fatal flaw. During JLA/Avengers, he met Kismet and the two fell in love. They are then kidnapped by the villain Krona when the Grandmaster engineers a merging of the Marvel Universe and the DC Universe, who use their connections to their universes in an attempt to destroy both so he can learn their secrets. After the Crisis was averted due to the Avengers and Justice League joining forces and defeating Krona, the two sadly parted ways.

When an alien race's experiments in eternal universal observation cause damage to Eternity, he is narrowly saved by the actions of the Fantastic Four, Doctor Strange, Black Panther, Storm, Gravity and the Silver Surfer. Strange uses Gravity as a "scalpel" based on his gravity-wielding powers to cut out the damaged portions while Storm serves as a temporary host to Eternity's consciousness. Meanwhile the other heroes hold back the universe's "antibodies" as they try to attack the perceived cause of the damage.

In the "Dark Reign" storyline, Eternity grants Hank Pym the title of Scientist Supreme, a scientific counterpart to the mystical title Sorcerer Supreme, as his scientific knowledge is advanced enough to be indiscernible from magic. However, Loki later claims to have been posing as Eternity to trick Pym.

During the Time Runs Out storyline, the Beyonders are revealed to have killed Eternity as part of destroying abstract entities in each reality across the multiverse. Doctor Doom's killing of the Beyonders and use of their power to create Battleworld out of what remains of the multiverse revives Eternity.

The Ultimates travel outside of the multiverse to survey the timestream to evaluate its status after the rebirth of reality during the Secret Wars event. The forces outside Reality proved to be too great a challenge even for the immensely powerful and skilled super-team. They were rescued by Galactus, whom the Ultimates had earlier cured of his hunger and transformed into a positive cosmic force. An aspect of Eternity had informed Galactus of their danger and requested he assist them. However, after rescuing the Ultimates, Galactus discovered to his horror that the actual totality of Eternity - the actual life force of the Multiverse rather than the aspects of him that usually interact with lesser beings - has been imprisoned by his predecessor, the First Firmament.

== Eternity Mask ==
A black magical item created from Eternity's own substance during the sixth century by a group of renegade occultists to give whoever wears it equal power to anyone they may face, unless they are below the natural ability of the mask's user. This allowed for example, an untrained peasant to be on equal grounds with the Black Knight and fight him for three days straight. If the would-be user's intent was to commit acts of evil, the mask had no effect on them. So far the upper limits of this ability have yet to be established. The Mask has since then, been passed on from individual to individual and has been implied to have taken a role in the most important events in human history. One of the first known users of the mask was Jim Gardley (Masked Raider). Other users were the Black Rider, the Ferret, Thunderer and Jerome Hamilton (Blind Justice).

== Powers and abilities ==
Eternity is a tremendously powerful abstract entity. An embodiment of the universe, he has no real physical body. The entity can manipulate the universe to achieve essentially any desired effect, and as his name suggests, he is immortal and unaffected by the passage of time. Eternity can warp space and matter into a manifestation that can be perceived by lesser beings, or form avatars from another plane of existence known as the Dimension of Manifestations.

Thanos, wielding the Infinity Gauntlet, ranked Eternity's scale of power as above that of Lord Chaos and Master Order and equal to that of Infinity, but below that of the Living Tribunal.

== Reception ==
"The Eternity Saga" is frequently cited on lists of the top Doctor Strange storylines to read, being called "Lee and Ditko’s magnum opus of oddity." In 2017, CBR.com highlighted the surreal and trippy imagery attributed to the emergence of Eternity himself and his battle with Dormammu, when it was rated one of Marvel's top cosmic/space stories and voted 89th in the top 100 comic book storylines.

Eternity possibly served as inspiration for Marvel writers Jim Starlin and Steve Englehart.

== In other media ==
=== Television ===
- Eternity makes a cameo appearance in the X-Men: The Animated Series episode "Dark Phoenix".
- Eternity appears in Silver Surfer, voiced by John Neville. This version is explicitly referred to as male, serves as an observer, and is the brother of Infinity.

=== Film ===
Eternity appears in Thor: Love and Thunder. Gorr the God Butcher reaches Eternity's realm using Thor's axe Stormbreaker to wish for the death of all gods. However, Thor convinces Gorr to use his wish to resurrect his daughter Love instead.

=== Merchandise ===
A bust of Eternity was released by Bowen Designs and designed by the Kucharek brothers.

== See also ==
- Captain Universe
