= The Thanos Quest =

1990 comic book series by Starlin and Lim

- Thanos featured on the cover of The Thanos Quest #1 (Sep. 1990).

Publication information
- Publisher: Marvel Comics
- Format: Mini-series
- Genre: Superhero
- Publication date: September–October 1990
- No. of issues: 2
- Main character(s): Thanos; Elders of the Universe

Creative team
- Written by: Jim Starlin
- Penciller: Ron Lim
- Inker: John Beatty
- Colorist: Tom Vincent

Collected editions
- Rebirth Of Thanos: ISBN 0-7851-2046-7

The Thanos Quest is a two-issue comic book limited series published in September and October 1990 by Marvel Comics. The series was written by Jim Starlin, and drawn by Ron Lim.

The storyline is a continuation of events involving resurrected Starlin-character Thanos, featured in the title Silver Surfer. The storyline leads directly into three consecutive limited series, The Infinity Gauntlet, The Infinity War, and The Infinity Crusade.

== Plot summary ==
Recently resurrected by Death in order to wipe out half of the population of the universe, the Titan Thanos discovers the true nature of the six Infinity Gems after gazing into Death's Infinity Well. Convincing Death that possession of the gems will aid him tremendously in his quest, he gains her permission to seek them out from the cosmic entities that currently possess them.

In Part One of The Thanos Quest, Thanos first travels to the Nexus of Reality where the "concept being" known as the In-Betweener is being imprisoned by Lord Chaos and Master Order; after freeing him from the sphere in which he is being incarcerated, Thanos forcibly takes the Soul Gem from the In-Betweener, whose powers are useless at the heart of the realm of Chaos and Order.

Thanos next seeks out the Champion of the Universe on a planet called Tamarata, where he has been testing his combat prowess against the planet's numerous armies. Challenging him to single combat, Thanos tricks the Champion into destroying the planet and stranding himself in space. He then offers the Champion transportation to the nearest planet in exchange for the Champion's Power Gem, to which the Champion agrees, believing that the gem has never functioned, but not realizing that he has tapped into its power reserves subconsciously. Thanos upholds his part of the bargain, but jettisons the Champion into the unnamed planet's atmosphere, leaving him to plummet to the planet's surface. His reasoning is that he had never promised the Champion a "soft landing".

Thanos's next target is the Gardener, who has been in possession of the Time Gem and has used its powers to create a garden of unparalleled beauty. After a short and seemingly peaceful discussion, the Gardener attempts to use the power of his gem to strangle Thanos in various items of vegetation; using the Power Gem, Thanos breaks free and turns the Gardener's creations against him before taking the gem.

In Part Two, Thanos contacts the Collector, with whom he has apparently had an amicable past and who has been monitoring his activities since Thanos's encounter with the Champion. Thanos informs the Collector that he will soon be coming into possession of a treasure so rare that the Collector will gladly part with his gem in trade for it.

Thanos then seeks out the Runner, who has been using the Space Gem in order to make himself the fastest being in existence. After the Runner destroys Thanos's craft, Thanos reveals to him that he has discovered the true nature of the Infinity Gems; they are, in fact, the physical remnants of a godlike being that existed before the creation of our universe, who committed a form of cosmic suicide out of loneliness. He then uses the Time gem taken from the Gardener to turn the Runner first into an extremely old and decrepit man, and then into an infant. With the infant Runner in hand, he teleports back to the Collector's ship and proceeds to trade the Runner for the Collector's gem, the Reality Gem, which Thanos demonstrates to the astonished Collector has the ability to control reality. The Collector begs Thanos to leave, which he does... but only after allowing the Runner to revert to his normal age and form to take out his anger on the Collector.

Thanos's final target is the Grandmaster, a consummate games-man. With the final gem, the Mind Gem, imprisoned in a random teleportation device that will only deactivate with his death, he informs Thanos that he cannot have the gem until he bests him in a game of his choosing. The two then compete in a virtual reality combat game, which Thanos seems to win until it is shown that the Grandmaster had sabotaged Thanos's weaponry. However, Thanos then reveals that the body with which the Grandmaster had been competing was merely a robotic clone of Thanos; its destruction being inconsequential, the real Thanos proceeds to destroy the gaming equipment, killing the Grandmaster and freeing the Mind Gem.

Thanos returns to Death's sanctum with the six Infinity Gems in his possession, boasting of his achievement and his new-found status as Death's equal. Death congratulates his accomplishment, though still speaks to him through her various minions. When Thanos demands that Death address him personally as her mate, she points out to him, again through her minions, with his newly achieved status of omnipotence, Thanos is not her equal, but her superior, and that it would therefore not be fitting for her to address him directly. Thanos destroys the minion in a fit of anger and stalks from Death's throne room, trying to comprehend his miscalculation, and finally wondering, while shedding a tear, how becoming a god could prove such a hollow victory.

== Collected editions ==
The series has been reprinted a number of times, first in a 2000 one-shot and then as part of the Rebirth of Thanos trade paperback which brought together all the pre-Infinity Gauntlet issues dealing with Thanos's return:

- Silver Surfer: Rebirth Of Thanos (collects Silver Surfer #34-38, The Thanos Quest mini-series, and "The Final Flower!" from Logan's Run #6, 224 pages, April 2006, ISBN 0-7851-2046-7)

== In other media ==
Some elements of the comic were later loosely adapted in Avengers: Infinity War.
