= Genis-Vell =

- Genis-Vell as Captain Marvel. Art by ChrisCross and Chris Sotomayor.

Publication information
- Publisher: Marvel Comics
- First appearance: As Legacy: Silver Surfer Annual #6 (October 1993); As Captain Marvel: Captain Marvel vol. 3 #1 (December 1995); As Photon: New Thunderbolts #6 (May 2005)
- Created by: Ron Marz; Ron Lim

In-story information
- Full name: Genis-Vell
- Species: Kree / Titanian hybrid
- Team affiliations: Kree Space Navy; Thunderbolts
- Notable aliases: Captain Marvel; Legacy; Photon
- Abilities: Cosmic awareness granting omniversal level telepathy; Energy projection, absorption, and manipulation; Super strength, speed, and durability; Dimension transportation; Cosmic awareness; Illusion inducement; Force fields; Flight; Wields Nega-Bands

Genis-Vell is a superhero appearing in American comic books published by Marvel Comics. Created by Ron Marz and Ron Lim, the character first appeared in Silver Surfer vol. 3 Annual #6 (1993). Genis-Vell is the son of superhero Mar-Vell and the brother of superhero Phyla-Vell. The character has also been known as Legacy, Captain Marvel, and Photon at various points in his history.

== Publication history ==
=== 1990s ===
Genis-Vell debuted in Silver Surfer vol. 3 Annual #6 (1993) under the codename Legacy, created by writer Ron Marz and artist Ron Lim. He appeared in the 1994 Cosmic Powers miniseries. He appeared in the 1995 Captain Marvel series, his first solo comic book series, by writer Fabian Nicieza and artist Ed Benes. It was cancelled after six issues. He appeared in the 1995 Avengers Unplugged series. He appeared in the 1998 Avengers Forever series. He appeared in the 1997 Thunderbolts series. He appeared in the 1999 Captain Marvel series, his second solo comic book series, which lasted for 35 issues until October 2002.

=== 2000s ===
Genis-Vell appeared as part of the U-Decide initiative in the 2002 Captain Marvel series, by writer Peter David. It was cancelled after 25 issues. He appeared in the 2022 Genis-Vell: Captain Marvel series, also written by David.

== Fictional character biography ==
=== Birth and early life ===
After the death of Mar-Vell (Captain Marvel), his lover Elysius decides to have a son. As one of the Eternals living on Titan, she uses the advanced technology of her race to impregnate herself using Mar-Vell's genetic material. Elysius seeks to protect her new son, Genis-Vell, from Mar-Vell's powerful enemies by taking him to a distant planet. There, she artificially ages him and implants false memories in his brain, making him believe that he had a natural childhood and that he is the son of Starfox.

Elysius, like her son, was created artificially. Elysius was created by the Titan computer ISAAC, which had been corrupted by Thanos.

=== Avengers Forever (the Destiny War) ===
Genis-Vell as Legacy. Silver Surfer Annual #6. Cover art by Ron Lim.

When the Destiny Force resurfaces in Rick Jones for a second time (the first time occurring during the Kree-Skrull War), it triggers a time-spanning conflict known as the Destiny War. A motley crew of Avengers are gathered. Among them is a future version of Genis, now known as Captain Marvel, eventually revealed to have been selected because of the role his interaction with Rick would play in shaping the final outcome of the battle. At the climax of the Destiny War and with Rick's life in jeopardy, Genis recreates the Nega-Band connection with Rick to save him. After the war, Rick returns to the current day and is inadvertently bound to Genis, triggering the latter's latent cosmic awareness.

=== Bonded ===
Rick and Genis spend a considerable time adventuring together, in an arrangement somewhat reminiscent of the one that existed between Genis' father, Mar-Vell, and Rick years before. While they were bound, Mar-Vell and Rick exchanged places between the regular universe and the Negative Zone and shared a telepathic bond. Genis-Vell and Rick, however, alternate between the regular universe and the Microverse. In addition to their telepathic bond, the two can see each other in reflective surfaces or as red ghostly visions.

Whereas Mar-Vell and Rick formed a strong friendship during their time together, Genis-Vell and Rick have a much harder time getting along. Genis' alien (and immature) perspective make him unfathomable to Rick's jaded-sidekick sensibilities. Their ability to see and hear what the other is experiencing lead to awkward situations with Rick's wife, Marlo Chandler, and Genis' many amorous partners. Eventually, however, they become good friends.

=== Insanity ===
Genis' inability to control his cosmic awareness results in insanity. After a string of irrational adventures, Genis destroys the multiverse at the behest of Entropy and Epiphany. The multiverse is recreated with a Last Thursdayism effect on the universe's population, although with several alterations including him still wearing the Kree uniform from a timeline that no longer exist and he has an adult sister named Phyla-Vell. Although he swears to do good throughout the universe, a hallucination of Epiphany tells him that he is still insane.

Genis sets up an office for his superhero activities on Hyperion. Phyla arrives to mock his efforts, but they are interrupted when a future version of Marlo attacks them. Genis travels through time to find out why Marlo became a villain, and hopefully prevent it. Genis learns that his son Ely-Vell (who has not yet been born in Genis' timeline) is evil and plans to use both Marlo and Genis to trigger a near-universal extinction event. Unable to overcome his son in battle, Genis defeats Ely by choosing to kill him as an infant (an event still in his future). Rather than killing Ely, Genis instead resolves to not have children. After he makes this decision, Ely fades away. Genis returns to the present, suffering great anguish from his choice. He is then separated from Rick by the cosmic entity Expediency.

=== Photon and the New Thunderbolts ===
Genis as Photon (upper right) battling Baron Zemo. Cover to Thunderbolts #100. Art by Tom Grummett.

Genis travels to Earth and joins MACH-IV's new team of Thunderbolts. During this time, he develops an interest in Songbird. The manipulations of the Purple Man cause Atlas to attack Genis in a rage, apparently killing him and throwing his body into the Hudson River. Though Genis would have recovered on his own, former Thunderbolt Baron Zemo uses a pair of alien moonstones to form a cocoon of energy, feeding him energy from the beginning and end of the universe to speed his recovery. When he emerges, he has absorbed the Nega-Bands into his body.

Genis' subsequent adoption of the name "Photon" causes him to quarrel with Monica Rambeau, who had also called herself "Photon" and "Captain Marvel." In the end, Genis is allowed to use the name "Photon" and Monica decides to use the codename "Pulsar".

However, Zemo realises that his mistake of siphoning energy from the beginning and end of time created a link between Genis and the universe that threatens to end existence. Zemo explores all future timelines with the moonstones, but fails to find a way to save both Genis and the universe: In every possible future timeline, Genis destroys the universe. Genis is aware of this, but keeps trying to tune his cosmic awareness in order to find a way to prevent this from happening. Finally, in a fight with Zemo, Genis is defeated. Zemo traps Genis in a moment in time. He then uses a combination of Blackout's Darkforce powers and the moonstones to trap Genis in the Darkforce.

In Captain Marvel (vol. 10), Carol Danvers and Phyla-Vell free Genis from the Darkforce.

== Powers and abilities ==
Genis-Vell possesses superhuman strength, durability, and speed, being able to exceed the speed of light. Due to his Titanian Eternal mother, Genis is far more powerful than his father, although he still needs the Nega-Bands to make full use of his abilities. His powers were also increased further when he merged with his future self, granting him the capability to kill all the troops of the Shi'ar/Kree/Skrull coalition present in the galaxy with a mere thought by manipulating the electrical energy in their heads. He is capable of manipulating, projecting and absorbing forms of energy such as magic, electric, photonic and atomic, but the full extent of his powers is unknown. His energy projection is so vast that he was able to kill a multiversal incarnate of the cosmic entity Eternity, destroying all of creation. He was even able to help Eternity's son Entropy in restarting the multiverse.

Initially, he only uses the Nega-Bands for flight, energy siphoning, energy blasts, and transportation to and from the Negative Zone. He is also able to augment his strength beyond fifteen tons to the point where he was able to hurt the Maestro, Hyperion, and Drax the Destroyer, and physically match the Sentry. After bonding with Rick, his latent multiversal cosmic awareness, inherited from his father, is activated. His link to another dimension is redirected from the Negative Zone to the Microverse. Genis-Vell was able to revive himself from death. He was also able to give the Punisher insight into his future which, in turn, had Castle in tears, and help King Thor discover the truth about the relationship of the Asgardians and the Ice Giants, allowing him to uncover the lies spread by Odin. It is later revealed that he can exist in the past, present and future of multiple realities at the same time, which allows him to open portals to different timelines.

Originally, he can focus his cosmic awareness, allowing him to realize exactly what he needs to know at a particular time. When his powers grew, however, he is driven mad by the vast scope of his awareness, but, despite this, he was an omniversal-level telepath. While insane, he returns from the dead, raises Rick Jones from the dead, controls other dead bodies, creates holograms, empowers an alien serial killer, and survives a combined assault from multiple alien spacefleets. He's also shown to be able to manipulate space and time at will, as well as create rifts in space and time, summon past versions of himself and others, teleport himself and others and travel through time.

After Zemo accidentally links him to other areas of time, Genis absorbs the Nega-Bands.

During the time of the events of House of M, his cosmic awareness could see through the fictitious reality created by Scarlet Witch, revealing the distorted nature of that universe, and as a result, Genis inadvertently collapsed and expanded all of reality for one second. Later, it is also revealed that Genis could bisect space, dividing everybody and everything in a range of 500 km into what is, was and could be. In his conversation with Atlas, we learn that he would have been able to undo the events of House of M, but was unwilling to due to his insecurities and his fear of making the wrong choice.

== Reception ==
=== Critical response ===
Screen Rant included him in their "15 Most Powerful Versions Of Captain Marvel From The Comics" list, and in their "10 Best Captain Marvel Comics Characters Not In The MCU" list, and ranked him 8th in their "10 Best Cosmic Heroes Not Yet In The MCU" list. Comic Book Resources ranked Genis-Vell 2nd in their "13 Strongest Members Of The Thunderbolts" list, 5th in their "19 Captain Marvel Costumes" list, 6th in their "The Kree: The 10 Most Powerful Members Of The Race" list, 7th in their "All The Captain Marvels" list, and 7th in their "16 Marvel Cosmic Beings Scarier Than Thanos" list.

== Literary reception ==
=== Volumes ===
==== Genis-Vell: Captain Marvel - 2022 ====
Evan Valentine of ComicBook.com gave Genis-Vell: Captain Marvel #1 a grade of 4.5 out of 5, writing, "Early in my comic book reading career, Peter David's Captain Marvel is a series that remained in my head for some time. David returns to the complicated relationship between Rick Jones and Genis-Vell alongside Juanan Ramirez and the new series doesn't miss a beat from the original run of this pair. Captain Marvel does a fantastic job of balancing the old school continuity with the modern events of the day, creating a fun ride for fans new and old. Even if you never got into the original series and have never read about Genis-Vell before, there's plenty here to love." Evan Valentine of ComicBook.com gave Genis-Vell: Captain Marvel #2 a grade of 4.5 out of 5, saying, "Peter David has returned to the telling tales of Captain Marvel's son, Genis-Vell, without missing a beat. The structure of this new series works well in terms of reminding readers what Genis' first series was like, working in tandem with Rick Jones for more humorous, light-hearted fare that still has a bite, while also catching up with what he's been up to nowadays. This mini-series acts as a fantastic way to make both old and new readers happy, working on the strengths of the character while also bringing something fresh to the table. Whether you're a fan of Genis-Vell or not, this comic is definitely worth your time."

== In other media ==
=== Video games ===
Genis-Vell as Captain Marvel appears in Marvel: Ultimate Alliance, voiced by Roger Rose.

=== Merchandise ===
- Toy Biz released two Genis-Vell figures in the Marvel Select line, with one depicting him in Kree Armor and the other as Captain Marvel.
- In 2002, Bowen Designs released a mini-bust of Genis-Vell, which was sculpted by Randy Bowen and limited to 3500 pieces, with the prototype painted by John A. Ficchi.
- In 2007, Bowen Designs released a full size statue of Genis-Vell / Captain Marvel, which was sculpted and designed by the Kucharek Brothers and limited to 500 pieces.
- In 2012, HeroClix Chaos War released an action figure of Genis-Vell.

== Collected editions ==
Title	Material collected	Published date	ISBN
Captain Marvel: First Contact	Captain Marvel (vol. 4) #0-6	August 2001	978-0785107910
Captain Marvel Vol. 1: Nothing to Lose	Captain Marvel (vol. 5) #1-6	June 2003	978-0785111047
Captain Marvel Vol. 2: Coven	Captain Marvel (vol. 5) #7-12	September 2003	978-0785113065
Captain Marvel Vol. 3: Crazy Like a Fox	Captain Marvel (vol. 5) #13-18	May 2004	978-0785113409
Captain Marvel Vol. 4: Odyssey	Captain Marvel (vol. 5) #19-25	November 2004	978-0785115304
Genis-Vell: Captain Marvel	Genis-Vell: Captain Marvel #1-5	January 2023	978-1302946722
