= The Infinity Gauntlet =

1991 American comic book storyline

- Cover to Infinity Gauntlet (third edition TPB) (2011). Art by George Pérez.

Publication information
- Publisher: Marvel Comics
- Schedule: Monthly
- Format: Limited series
- Genre: Superhero
- Publication date: July – December 1991
- No. of issues: 6
- Main character(s): Avengers; Adam Warlock; Mephisto; Thanos; Silver Surfer; Nebula; Death; Defenders; Doctor Strange; Galactus; Watcher

Creative team
- Written by: Jim Starlin
- Penciller(s): George Pérez; Ron Lim
- Inker(s): Josef Rubinstein; Tom Christopher; Bruce N Solotoff
- Letterer: Jack Morelli
- Colorist(s): Max Scheele; Ian Laughlin
- Editor: Craig Anderson

Collected editions
- 1st Ed. TPB (1992): ISBN 0871359448
- 2nd Ed. TPB (2006): ISBN 0785123490
- 3rd Ed. TPB (2011): ISBN 0785156593
- HC Edition (2010): ISBN 0785145494
- Omnibus (2014): ISBN 078515468X
- Deluxe TPB (2019): ISBN 1302915959

The Infinity Gauntlet is an American comic book storyline published by Marvel Comics. In addition to an eponymous, six-issue limited series written by Jim Starlin and pencilled by George Pérez and Ron Lim, crossover chapters appeared in related comic books. Since its initial serialization from July to December 1991, the series has been reprinted in various formats and editions.

The series' events are driven by Thanos, a nihilist character created for Marvel by Starlin in 1973. When Starlin began writing Silver Surfer in 1990, he and Lim began a new plot with Thanos that developed over sixteen monthly issues and a spin-off limited series before concluding in The Infinity Gauntlet. Pérez was brought in to draw The Infinity Gauntlet because he had more name recognition among fans and because Lim already had a full schedule. However, after completing three issues and part of the fourth, his own busy schedule and dissatisfaction with the story led to him being replaced by Lim.

At the start of The Infinity Gauntlet, the character Thanos has collected all six Infinity Gems and attached them to his gauntlet. With their combined power, he becomes "like a god" and sets out to win the affection of Mistress Death, the living embodiment of death in the Marvel Universe. When Thanos uses his powers to instantly erase half of the life in the universe from existence, Adam Warlock leads Earth's remaining heroes against him. After the Infinity Gauntlet is stolen by Thanos' villainous granddaughter Nebula, Thanos aids the remaining heroes in defeating her.

The series was a top seller for Marvel during publication and was followed by two immediate sequels, The Infinity War (1992) and The Infinity Crusade (1993). The story's events continued to be referenced in other Marvel comics for decades. The Infinity Gauntlet remained popular among fans, warranting multiple reprint editions and merchandise, with its themes and plot elements adapted into video games and animated cartoons. Most notable among later adaptations was the "Infinity Saga" of the Marvel Cinematic Universe, which incorporated elements of the original comic story into a saga that spanned across almost two dozen connected films. These culminated in Avengers: Infinity War (2018) and Avengers: Endgame (2019), which were the only films directly inspired by the storyline.

== Publication history ==
=== Background ===
Artist and character creator Jim Starlin introduced Thanos, the antagonist for the storyline, in Iron Man #55 (Feb. 1973). After providing artwork for Captain Marvel #24-25 (Jan. 1973 & March 1973), Starlin co-wrote #26 (May 1973) with Mike Friedrich, which featured Thanos (albeit in shadow) on a Marvel cover for the first time and marked the beginning of what was later coined the "First Thanos War". After collaborating with Friedrich for #27-28 (July & Sept. 1973), Starlin then assumed sole writing duties for the remainder of the sweeping cosmic saga from #29-33 (Nov. 1973 - July 1974). Starlin completed one final issue, #34 (Sept. 1974), laying the groundwork for the eventual death of hero Mar-Vell before leaving the title.

In 1975, Starlin began writing and illustrating Strange Tales, in which he made significant changes to Adam Warlock and developed the concept of the Infinity Gems. He reintroduced Thanos first as Warlock's ally, then as his opponent in a storyline known as the "Second Thanos War" that ran until 1977. Because of their close publications dates, the two Thanos Wars are sometimes considered to be one storyline. Both are considered "cosmic" stories and led to Starlin being known as a "cosmic" writer.

Starlin stopped doing regular work for Marvel after concluding the Second Thanos War, but occasionally returned for short projects like The Death of Captain Marvel graphic novel and creator-owned work such as the cosmic-themed Dreadstar through the 1980s. He also did high-profile work for DC Comics, such as Batman and Cosmic Odyssey. In a 1990 interview, Starlin described himself as the only writer who had been allowed to "play" with Thanos, although other writers had scripted some tie-in chapters of the First Thanos War.

Artist George Pérez was known for drawing comics featuring large casts. He came to prominence in the 1970s while working on Marvel's The Avengers before leaving the company to work for DC on comics such as New Teen Titans, Crisis on Infinite Earths, and Wonder Woman. In 1984, Pérez entered into an exclusive contract with DC.

=== Development ===
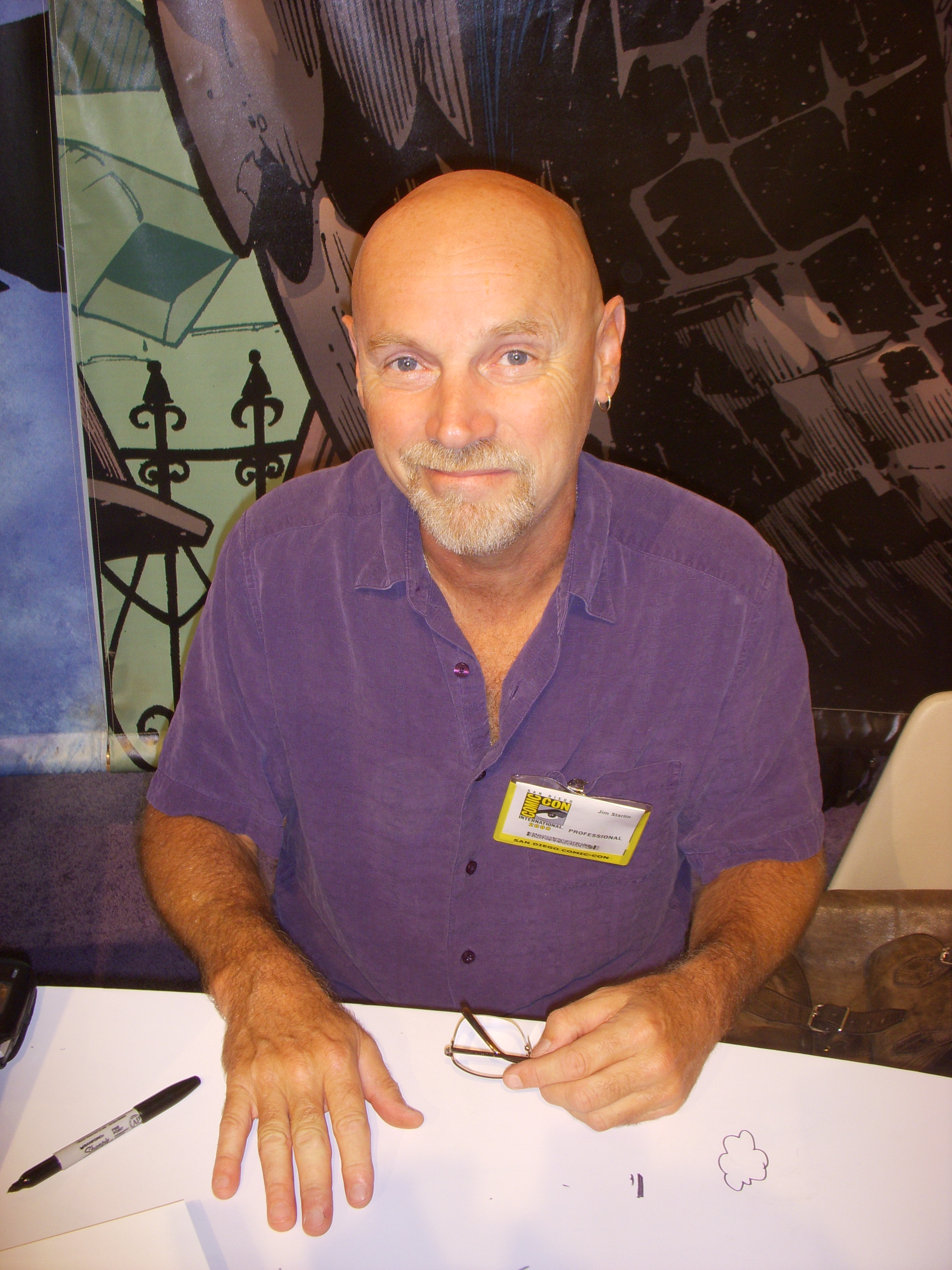
Series writer Jim Starlin in 2008

In 1988, Steve Englehart was writing Silver Surfer and one of his storylines involved the Infinity Gems and Mistress Death. He asked to do a follow-up story in which Mistress Death uses Thanos to get revenge on her enemies, but editor-in-chief Tom DeFalco did not know who Thanos was. After the character was explained to him, DeFalco liked the idea so much he wanted to save it for a big summer crossover instead. At the time, he indicated he wanted to format it like "The Evolutionary War", a 1988 crossover spread across the annuals of several continuing series instead of being contained in a limited series.

Because of his ties to Thanos, Starlin was invited back to Marvel to write the story. He returned because work for him at DC declined following his controversial Batman story "A Death in the Family" (1988). Inspired by the work he had recently read from Wilhelm Reich, Carlos Castaneda, and Roger Zelazny, Starlin wanted to purposely add multiple layers to his characters instead of letting them be one-dimensional. He started writing with the expectation that this would be the last Thanos story "at least for a while" and was midway through the story before deciding to make Thanos an antihero. He began writing Silver Surfer with #34, cover dated February 1990. To organize various plot and character points, Starlin made notes on 3-by-5 cards and pinned them to a large piece of plywood hung on his wall.

His first four issues reintroduced Thanos and was seen as the first act of the new Thanos storyline. Initially, Starlin and editor Craig Anderson planned for the story to remain contained within the pages of Silver Surfer. However, Marvel had recently been purchased and the new owners mandated all intellectual property be exploited to maximum potential. (Note: Marvel was purchased by Ronald Perelman's company MacAndrews & Forbes in 1989.) To capitalize on the excitement surrounding Thanos' return, the start of the second act was spun off into the two-issue limited series The Thanos Quest, released in September–October 1990. The plot then continued in Silver Surfer beginning with #44. In Silver Surfer #46, Starlin reintroduced Adam Warlock and his supporting cast. He included these characters because the editors told him a different writer wanted to use them, and they would let him unless Starlin wanted to use them first. Starlin was not impressed by the other writer's work, so he wrote Warlock into his Silver Surfer story. Again, Starlin and Anderson planned to conclude the story in the pages of Silver Surfer, but the sales of The Thanos Quest were high enough to warrant another spin-off. After Silver Surfer #50, the plot moved to The Infinity Gauntlet. Because of the time required to write the double-length issues of the limited series and coordinate tie-ins, Starlin had to leave the Silver Surfer series at #50.

The editorial staff did not oppose Starlin's plans to kill major characters, which he believes was partly because Anderson did not share many of the details with his peers. They did, however, limit which of "their" characters could have roles in the story. For example, X-Men editor Bob Harras only allowed Cyclops and Wolverine to appear. The rest of the X-Men cast were said to have died off-panel or were otherwise omitted. This hesitancy was due in part to the relative newness of summer crossover events. (Note: Although Marvel characters had been meeting and interacting for years, these stories were typically contained within one character's comic book, annuals, or a limited series. These rarely had a direct impact on the schedule or plot of other monthly comic books. In 1985, Secret Wars II was the first limited series from Marvel featuring crossovers from regular monthly series. While the frequency of inter-title crossovers increased afterwards, The Infinity Gauntlet was the second time the Secret Wars II format had been used.)

Two similar images of the character Thanos from the main series. The image on the left (Thanos with Mephisto), was drawn by George Perez. The image on the right, (Thanos confronts Nebula), was drawn by Ron Lim. Management was unsure of the artistic change at the time, and some critics found the different styles jarring.

Early in 1990, Marvel writer/artist Jim Valentino learned Pérez's contract with DC Comics was going to lapse in August. He contacted Pérez by phone to see if he would ink a cover to Guardians of the Galaxy, a comic Valentino was currently writing and penciling. Pérez agreed, and Valentino told Anderson, who was his editor as well. Anderson passed the information to Starlin, who called Pérez and asked him to pencil The Infinity Gauntlet. After working out the terms with Starlin and Anderson, Pérez agreed to the job. In a 1991 interview, Pérez speculated that he was asked because Silver Surfer and The Thanos Quest penciller Ron Lim was too busy.

Although Pérez had been a writer as well as an artist at DC, he agreed to work from full scripts on The Infinity Gauntlet because he was not familiar with the current state of Marvel's characters. (Note: Some comics are created with more collaboration between writers and artists than others. A style like the Marvel Method gives the artist more control and input into a story. A full script places more limits on the choices an artist can make.) From the start, Pérez found this to be "a little aggravating, unnerving" because of the limits it placed on him. Starlin gave Pérez a suggested layout with each script to use as a reference, but Pérez ignored them with Starlin's blessing. He exercised this freedom by giving some scenes more space, even moving some scenes to different pages. Early in the collaboration, he asked Starlin to increase the number of characters appearing in the story so his return to Marvel would "knock fans' socks off".

Before he had finished the interior art for the first issue, Pérez completed the pencils for the covers of the first four issues so they could be used as promotional material. Some characters however, like Thor and Quasar, were wearing outdated costumes on the cover of issue three and had to be redrawn, which frustrated Pérez. Starlin, who wrote the scripts months in advance, also had to make minor adjustments to account for changes in these characters and the Hulk.

During production, Pérez was also pencilling War of the Gods for DC Comics, a Wonder Woman miniseries he described as a "highly stressful" project. When he began to fall behind schedule on both projects, he wanted to quit War of the Gods but was contractually bound to complete it. Partly because of this stress and partly because he had become used to writing as well as drawing, he became overly critical of Starlin's scripts for The Infinity Gauntlet. Specifically, he felt Starlin's story could be told in fewer pages. His lack of enthusiasm caused him to work slower, and he began to fall further behind schedule. In a 1994 interview, Starlin claimed Pérez was also acting at the time, and that it was a bigger contributor to the scheduling problems than the comic workload.

When it became clear Pérez would not be able to meet the deadline for the fourth issue, DeFalco asked regular Silver Surfer penciler Ron Lim to complete issue #4. DeFalco suggested to Pérez that he let Lim finish the rest of the series, and Pérez agreed. Pérez understood the decision, and later said he felt Lim should have been the artist from the beginning. He inked Lim's covers for the remainder of the series to show he bore no ill will to the change. Although Marvel's management had feared sales would fall with Pérez's departure, sales rose with each issue Lim penciled.

To replace Pérez, Lim had to leave his regular work on the monthly Captain America title. He cites Pérez as an influence and found it "nerve-wracking" to supplant him. Furthermore, the large cast made it the most challenging book he had done at that point in his career. Still, he said it was "fun" to work on the design aspect of The Infinity Gauntlet.

When he saw sales figures for The Infinity Gauntlet, Pérez realized he probably lost "tens of thousands of dollars" in royalty payments by leaving the series, but he was glad he left when he learned a sequel was in development. Like Starlin, Pérez had begun the project believing it would be the last Thanos story, but management asked Starlin to write a sequel midway through The Infinity Gauntlet. By then, Starlin had already conceived follow-up concepts and knew it would be a trilogy.

=== Publication ===
Marvel's marketing department "mega-hyped" the event in the months leading up to its release according to journalist Sean Howe. One aspect of the promotion was sending direct market retailers a kit that included a letter explaining details of the series, a sign to put by their cash register, and a poster 18 inches wide by 36 inches tall. Marvel's promotional magazine Marvel Age featured a cover story on The Thanos Quest and a Starlin interview in issue #91 (August 1990), followed by a 7-page preview of The Infinity Gauntlet #1 in Marvel Age #99 (April 1991). The limited series was the cover feature on Comics Interview #94 in March 1991, which included an 8-page interview with Pérez, and Starlin was interviewed about the series in Comics Scene #19 in June 1991.

Marvel initially planned to release a new issue every two weeks, but deadline problems caused it to be released monthly. Issues had cover dates between July and December 1991. Each one was available in both comic specialty stores and newsstand outlets, which included supermarkets and department stores. Although the cover artwork was identical, the edition sold in comic stores featured additional artwork celebrating Marvel's 30th anniversary in place of the barcode found on the newsstand edition. (Note: Most comic specialty stores did not have barcode readers at the time, and this minor difference made it easy for publishers to distinguish the two editions. Newsstands could return unsold copies for credit, but specialty stores could not.) Each issue was 48 pages and cover priced at $2.50 at a time when the average Marvel comic was $1.00 and 24 pages.

=== Tie-ins ===
Sleepwalker #7: a tie-in issue indicated by the triangle icon in the top right corner. Art is by Bret Blevins.

To emphasize the connected nature of Marvel's comic books, some ongoing series starring characters seen in The Infinity Gauntlet had contemporary issues showing the main plot from a different point of view or explored consequences of certain events. These issues featured a triangle in the top right corner of their covers with the text "An Infinity Gauntlet Crossover". These tie-in issues did not impact the plot of the limited series and could be skipped by readers without creating plot holes. Doctor Strange #36 was set after the events of the crossover and featured a triangle with the text "An Infinity Gauntlet Epilogue".

Unlike other crossovers such as Armageddon 2001 (the competing 1991 crossover from DC Comics) which featured tie-ins from a large majority of their publisher's comics, The Infinity Gauntlet only had tie-ins from titles which were obviously connected to the event or from series which needed a boost in sales. According to Pérez, Marvel's stance toward the tie-ins for its low-selling titles was "do it or else". Starlin remained uninvolved, allowing writers to choose for themselves which story elements they wished to use.

Issues featuring the triangular icon on their covers
Title	Issue(s)	Cover date	Writer	Artist
Cloak and Dagger (vol. 3)	#18	June	Terry Kavanagh	Dave Cross and Sam Delarosa
Doctor Strange, Sorcerer Supreme (vol. 3)	#31–36	July–December	Roy and Dann Thomas	Tony DeZuniga
The Incredible Hulk (vol. 2)	#384–385	August–September	Peter David	Dale Keown
Quasar	#26	September	Mark Gruenwald	Dave Hoover
Silver Surfer (vol. 3)	#51–59	July–November	Ron Marz	Ron Lim and Tom Christopher
Sleepwalker	#7	December	Bob Budiansky	Bret Blevins

=== Collected editions and reprints ===
The miniseries was collected in a single softcover edition released in 1992, a time when publishers only collected popular storylines, to coincide with the release of The Infinity War. It featured new cover artwork by Pérez and was enhanced with a foil logo. Later printings of this edition had alternate cover artwork from different artists and no enhancement. The suggested retail price was $19.95, five dollars more than the total retail cost of the individual issues it contained.

In June 2006, Marvel issued a second softcover collected edition to coincide with Keith Giffen and Andrea Di Vito's Annihilation, another cosmic-level crossover starring Thanos and the Silver Surfer. This edition used the cover art from issue #1 and had a trade dress matching the first edition collections of The Infinity War and The Infinity Crusade which were released shortly thereafter. The month of release, it sold approximately 2,500 copies and was the 33rd best-selling comic collection according to Diamond Distribution. Marvel also released a Silver Surfer collection subtitled "The Rebirth of Thanos" in 2006 which included four of the lead-in issues of Silver Surfer and both issues of The Thanos Quest.

A hardcover edition was released in July 2010 as the 46th entry in the Marvel Premiere Classic line. Like other volumes in this line, it was available with two covers. The standard cover featured a cutout of Thanos from the cover of issue #4 on a black matte background with the title in metallic red ink. The variant cover, available only to comic specialty stores, featured the cover art for issue #1 reduced 50% against a black and red background. The variant edition identifies itself as #46 on its spine.

In 2011, a third edition softcover was released. The first printing reused the artwork from the standard cover of the Premiere Classic edition. Later printings reverted to the cover of issue #1. Sales of the collection spiked after Thanos appeared in a post-credits scene of the 2012 film The Avengers, causing The Infinity Gauntlet to be the highest selling graphic novel in 2018.

In July 2014, Marvel released a 1,248 page omnibus edition of The Infinity Gauntlet. In addition to the limited series, the hardcover also included the lead-up issues of Silver Surfer, The Thanos Quest, and the marketed tie-ins. It also included additional issues of Incredible Hulk, Quasar, Silver Surfer, and Spider-Man which had not been advertised as tie-ins, but were connected to the story. Comic book stores and the book market both offered a regular edition featuring the cover to The Infinity Gauntlet #1, but comic shops could also order a variant edition with cover art by Starlin.

The first issue of The Infinity Gauntlet was included in the initial wave of Marvel's "True Believers" line in April 2015. Consisting solely of reprints offered at a discount price, comic books in this line are meant to introduce newer readers to the most popular titles in Marvel's history. A new printing was paired with a "True Believers" reprint of Silver Surfer #34 in April 2018.

In March 2018, Marvel released an Infinity Gauntlet slipcase set of 12 hardcover books. Material began with Infinity Gauntlet Prologue and included all three Infinity crossovers, their tie-ins, intervening material, and a 528-page "companion" hardcover. The Infinity Gauntlet Prologue was released independently of the set at the same time.

A deluxe paperback was released in February 2019. It contained the miniseries and additional content discussing the creation of the series.

== Plot ==
Resurrected by Mistress Death to correct a perceived imbalance between life and death, the Mad Titan Thanos first encounters the Silver Surfer, and subsequently fakes his own death to proceed without interference. Thanos decides to reacquire the six Infinity Gems that he had previously used as a simple weapon. After defeating several of the Elders of the Universe and the In-Betweener, Thanos regains the gems and now has control over the six aspects of existence: Time, Space, Mind, Soul, Reality and Power. Ironically, now that Thanos is in possession of his "Infinity Gauntlet", Death must advise him via an intermediary - she cannot speak directly to him as he is now her superior.

When the Silver Surfer learns that Thanos is still alive and confronts him, Thanos traps the Silver Surfer's soul inside the Soul Gem. On "Soul World", the Silver Surfer encounters former enemy of Thanos, Adam Warlock. Warlock returns the Surfer to his body and promises to help defeat Thanos. The Surfer races to Earth to warn super-team the Avengers about the coming threat. Demonic entity Mephisto senses the power in the Infinity Gauntlet and offers to instruct Thanos in its use, while secretly waiting for an opportunity to steal it for himself.

Angry at Mistress Death's rejection, Thanos creates a shrine in her image, and then traps and burns Nebula – who pretended to be his "grand-daughter" – as an offering. When still rejected, Thanos in a fit of rage destroys several stars and then remembers the reason Mistress Death wanted him. With only the snap of his fingers, Thanos eliminates half of all living beings in the universe. The Surfer warns Doctor Strange about Thanos and encourages him to summon Earth's heroes. Cosmic entities Galactus and Epoch seek the source of the sudden imbalance, while Warlock and companions Gamora and Pip the Troll leave Soul World and occupy recently dead humans on Earth, reviving and altering the bodies to match their former appearance. Warlock appears before Doctor Strange and claims Thanos can only be defeated if Earth's remaining heroes unite under his command.

Warlock meets with a group of cosmic entities, who, despite the reluctance and withdrawal of the Living Tribunal and Eternity, agree to attack Thanos. The combined heroes attack while Warlock and the Surfer observe, with Thanos almost defeated after heeding Mephisto's advice to limit his power to demonstrate his devotion to Death, until Doctor Doom, a part of the team working against Thanos, arrogantly tries and fails to steal the gauntlet, to which Thanos then knocks Doom throughout all of space and kills most of the heroes.

After the heroes fail, the cosmic entities attack, with Mephisto and Mistress Death also joining in the assault on Thanos. Thanos, however, traps all the entities in stasis and changes the shrine to feature himself instead of Mistress Death. Believing he has defeated all of his enemies, Thanos separates his consciousness from his body and assumes an astral form taking the place of Eternity. Nebula uses this opportunity to steal the now-discarded Infinity Gauntlet. After restoring herself, Nebula banishes Thanos to drift through interstellar space, but he is rescued and brought to Earth by Doctor Strange. Warlock advises Thanos that whilst in Soul World he was able to examine the Titan's soul. Courtesy of his bond with the Soul Gem, Warlock knew Thanos would eventually lose the Infinity Gauntlet because, at his core, Thanos felt himself unworthy of the power. Overwhelmed by this revelation, Thanos agrees to help Warlock, Doctor Strange, and the Silver Surfer oppose Nebula.

Thanos tricks Nebula into restoring the universe to its prior condition, inadvertently reverting into a burn victim in the process. Nebula wills herself back to health before Thanos can retrieve the gauntlet, but during this distraction Warlock returns to Soul World and uses his connection to the gem to create disharmony between the other gems. This causes Nebula to remove the gauntlet, which an emerging Warlock claims for himself. Preferring death to imprisonment, Thanos apparently dies in a suicide bomb blast. The heroes have reservations about Warlock keeping the gauntlet, but he returns them to Earth. Warlock then travels 60 days into the future to visit an unnamed planet where Thanos is living as a farmer. Thanos advises Warlock he has given up his quest for power and plans to lead a quiet, introspective life.

== Reception ==
=== At release ===
The Infinity Gauntlet was an instant success and became one of the most influential storylines in comics from the 1990s. Both of the nationwide comic distributors at the time (Diamond Distribution and Capital City Distribution) reported each issue was one of their top ten sellers for the month of its release. When Capital City released their top 100 best selling single issues of 1991, Infinity Gauntlet issues fell between the 42nd and 64th positions. Aside from the first issue of The Punisher War Zone, all of the higher ranked entries were issues of Spider-Man, Robin II: The Joker's Wild!, or the X-Men franchise. Wizard, a comic magazine known for embracing speculation in the comic market, listed The Infinity Gauntlet #1 as the ninth "Hottest Book" in September 1991, and two lead-in issues of Silver Surfer were ranked sixth and tenth. The first issue's resale value rose above its $2.50 cover price in the back issue market, plateauing around $9 or $10 in late 1992. (Note: Because there are numerous price guides for comics and they do not always agree, a precise date and value for the plateau cannot be determined.)

The debut issue of the follow-up series, Warlock and the Infinity Watch, was the top recommendation from Wizard for December 1991. It led directly into the first sequel, The Infinity War, which began in June 1992. The next sequel, The Infinity Crusade, began in June 1993. The tie-ins to The Infinity Gauntlet also sold well, leading the editors who had put limits on characters appearing in The Infinity Gauntlet to request their books tie in to its sequels. Although both sequels sold well, they were viewed by critics like Wizard's Pat McCallum as being motivated by sales rather than storytelling because of their excessive tie-ins and slow narratives.

=== In later years ===
By the end of the decade, interest in the continuing story dwindled, with sequels poorly received by fans, and Warlock and the Infinity Watch canceled in 1995. The same year, Marvel moved the Infinity Gems from their main continuity to an alternate universe called the Ultraverse, a property Marvel acquired when it bought Malibu Comics. The Ultraverse comics were then canceled in 1996. By 1998, Wizard was no longer listing Infinity Gauntlet in its monthly price guide. The first edition of the paperback collection saw its last printing in 1999.

The iconography of the gauntlet remained popular, however. When Marvel partnered with fellow Disney subsidiary ESPN to create promotional images for the 2010–11 NBA season, the October 22, 2010 issue of ESPN: The Magazine included an advertisement showing Kobe Bryant wearing the gauntlet. When IGN released an unranked list of the all-time best comic book events in 2011, The Infinity Gauntlet was included and was noted for being "a template on which all future cosmic events were based". Its lasting appeal is often attributed to Pérez's artwork and Starlin's unusual treatment of classic heroes.

When Thanos made a cameo appearance in the 2012 film The Avengers, there was renewed interest in The Infinity Gauntlet. This was further heightened in October 2014 when the title of the third and fourth Avengers films were revealed to be Infinity War – Part I and Infinity War – Part II. (Note: The films were later renamed Avengers: Infinity War and Avengers: Endgame.) As the 2018 release of Infinity War neared, several comic news websites produced articles explaining the storyline and speculating on which elements would be included in the adaptation. The renewed attention from the films made the paperback collection of The Infinity Gauntlet the best-selling graphic novel in 2018.

Not all evaluations were positive – in a 2013 review for Multiversity Comics, Drew Bradley felt the story was "only great" if read in its entirety. At the time of his article, the collected edition of Act One was out of print, with much of Act Two not been reprinted in any form. Bradley felt the story would not live up to its hype if readers skipped the lead-in material. Writing for Digital Spy, Hugh Armitage complained about the comic's lack of real consequences, calling it "essentially [...] a really bizarre love story".

=== Legacy in comics ===
Aside from its immediate spin-off and sequels, the events of The Infinity Gauntlet have impacted storylines in later comics, including Thanos in 2003, Avengers (vol. 4) in 2011, and Secret Wars in 2016. Several of these later stories have downplayed the power of the gauntlet, often showing someone possessing it being beaten by a more powerful opponent.

The storyline from The Infinity Gauntlet has been revisited by other comic books in the years since its release. The series What If...?, which explores alternate outcomes to important events in the Marvel Universe, featured several issues in which different characters stole the gauntlet from Thanos or obtained it in another fashion. Beginning in August 2010, writer Brian Clevinger and artist Brian Churillathe retold the story for a younger audience in the four-issue limited series Avengers and the Infinity Gauntlet as part of the Marvel Adventures imprint. He used the basic framework of the story, but purposefully wrote it in a fashion that did not invite comparisons to the original, with which he did not believe he could compete. During the 2015 crossover Secret Wars, a five-issue limited series by Gerry Duggan and Dustin Weaver reused the title and featured similar elements.

== Merchandise ==
During initial publication, Tenacity Incorporated offered a licensed black T-shirt featuring cover artwork from the series. It was available exclusively through ads placed in Marvel comics. The front side had the cover artwork from issue four, and the back had the cover artwork from issue three.

Although no contemporary toys were created for the series, several Thanos action figures have been created in the years since that include the Infinity Gauntlet either as an accessory or as part of the sculpt, such as the 12 inch Marvel Select toy and the 2 inch Super Hero Squad toy. In 2011, a Marvel Universe toyline two-pack included Thanos, Warlock, an Infinity Gauntlet accessory for Warlock, and a reprint of The Infinity Gauntlet #3. (Note: The Thanos in this two-pack is a repaint of a previous release that included an Infinity Gauntlet as well.) Some toy sets have incorporated the series logo on their packaging, such as the 2009 Minimate set with Thanos, Warlock, Mephisto, and Drax the Destroyer or the San Diego Comic-Con exclusive set with Marvel Universe editions of Thanos, Mistress Death, Eros, Nebula, and a wearable Infinity Gauntlet made of foam.

A variety of licensed merchandise shaped the like Infinity Gauntlet has been created as well, including a coin bank and earrings from Think Geek, a bottle opener from Diamond Select Toys, a coffee mug from Entertainment Earth, and an oven mitt from Loot Crate.

== Adaptations ==
=== Television ===
- After the animated television series The Super Hero Squad Show introduced an "Infinity Sword" in its first season, its second season (2010–2011) loosely adapted The Infinity Gauntlet. Griptonite Games released a tie-in video game, Marvel Super Hero Squad: The Infinity Gauntlet, for several platforms in 2010.
- In 2014, the early episodes of the second season of the animated series Avengers Assemble adapted the storyline. It also included elements from the Thanos-centric 2013 crossover comic series Infinity written by Jonathan Hickman and penciled by Jim Cheung, Jerome Opeña, and Dustin Weaver, such as Thanos' allies, the Black Order.

=== Film ===
An Infinity Gauntlet prop with gems was included in the 2011 film Thor as an Easter egg for fans before Marvel Studios decided the Avengers films would adapt The Infinity Gauntlet. A post-credits scene in Avengers: Age of Ultron (2015) showed Thanos with a gauntlet without gems, and the one from Thor was stated to have been a fake in Thor: Ragnarok (2017). The 2018 film Avengers: Infinity War drew inspiration from The Infinity Gauntlet and depicts Thanos collecting the Infinity Stones and using them to kill half of the universe. Its 2019 sequel, Avengers: Endgame, focuses on the Avengers' attempts to undo Thanos' actions.

=== Video games ===
- Capcom adapted the storyline into two video games shortly after its release. The first, Marvel Super Heroes, was a fighting game released as an arcade game in 1995 before being ported to Sega Saturn and PlayStation in 1997. The second, Marvel Super Heroes In War of the Gems, was a beat 'em up released in 1996 for the Super Nintendo Entertainment System.
- In October 2011, WizKids announced they would adapt The Infinity Gauntlet into an organized play tournament for their collectible miniatures game Heroclix in 2012. Vendors who wanted to participate qualified for free game kits by purchasing a minimum amount of new Heroclix booster packs. It began in January and a new round was held once a month through August. At each round, players received a special game piece for participating and winners received limited edition pieces based on characters from the storyline. The eight participation pieces could be combined to create Thanos' shrine to Death and featured all of the gems. At the time of release, it was the largest Heroclix tournament.
- Capcom released Marvel vs. Capcom: Infinite for PlayStation 4, Xbox One, and Microsoft Windows in September 2017. While it features elements from the series, it is not a direct adaptation. To coincide with the game's release, Capcom held a global tournament series called "Battle for the Stones". The winner of the tournament received a cash prize and a light-up Infinity Gauntlet trophy.
