= Overlord (Marvel Comics) =

Overlord is a fictional character appearing in American comic books published by Marvel Comics. The character first appeared in Silver Surfer #6 (June 1969).

== Fictional character biography ==
The Overlord of Dakkam has conquered the universe in a future timeline, but was defeated by the Silver Surfer.
