= The Infinity Crusade =

1993 Starlin-Lim comic book series

- Cover of The Infinity Crusade 1 (Jun 1993), art by Ron Lim
- Publisher: Marvel Comics
- Publication date: June – November 1993
- Genre
Title(s)
Infinity Crusade #1-6
Warlock and the Infinity Watch #18-22
Warlock Chronicles #1-5
- Main character(s): The Avengers; Avengers West Coast; Fantastic Four; X-Men; X-Factor; New Warriors; Alpha Flight; Infinity Watch; Adam Warlock; Thanos; Goddess

Creative team
- Writer: Jim Starlin
- Penciller: Ron Lim
- Inker: Al Milgrom
- Colorist: Ian Laughlin
- Volume 1: ISBN 0-7851-3127-2
- Volume 2: ISBN 0-7851-3128-0

The Infinity Crusade is a six-issue comic book limited series published by Marvel Comics in 1993. The series was written by Jim Starlin and penciled by Ron Lim, Ian Laughlin, Al Milgrom and Jack Morelli and also the third and final chapter of the Infinity Saga.

It is a sequel to The Infinity Gauntlet and The Infinity War, both from the same creative team. The series depicts the final battle between Earth's superheroes and Adam Warlock's good side.

== Publication history ==
The main story alternated between The Infinity Crusade #1-6, Warlock and the Infinity Watch #18-22, and Warlock Chronicles #1-5.

Additional tie-ins to the story include Alpha Flight #122-124, Avengers West Coast #96-97, Cage #17, Darkhawk #30-31, Deathlok vol 2, #28-29, Doctor Strange, Sorcerer Supreme #54-56, Iron Man #295, Marc Spector: Moon Knight #57, Silver Sable and the Wild Pack #16-17, Silver Surfer vol 3, #83-85, Thor #463-467, and Web of Spider-Man #104-106.

All of these titles were published between June and November 1993.

== Plot summary ==
When hero Adam Warlock takes possession of the artifact the Infinity Gauntlet, he expels the good and evil aspects of his being to become a totally logical being, who can therefore use the Gauntlet wisely. This act not only freed the incarnation of his evil aspects, Warlock's old foe the Magus, but also created an incarnation of his good aspects, the Goddess. During the events of the Infinity War, the Goddess steals the five cosmic containment units (also known as Cosmic Cubes) collected by the Magus. She eventually collects a total of thirty, and uses these to form a "Cosmic Egg" capable of fulfilling wishes.

Using the Egg to create a planet called Paradise Omega, the Goddess kidnaps and brainwashes many of Earth's superheroes to act as her army. The heroes chosen are susceptible, as they are either especially religious, mystically inclined, or have had a near-death experience. The characters, led by the heroine Moondragon, are told to defend the Goddess while she meditates on how to rid the universe of all evil.

Heroes Mister Fantastic, the android Vision, and Iron Man investigate the disappearance of their allies and find Paradise Omega. They retreat when attacked by the brainwashed heroes, and contact Professor X, leader of the X-Men, who attempts to speak with Moondragon via telepathy. This results in a telepathic attack that leaves Professor X in a coma. The Titan Thanos is seen as a threat by the Goddess, and is her first target to be attacked, but is inexplicably saved by his enemy Adam Warlock. The Devil, Mephisto, offers his knowledge of the Goddess to Thanos and Warlock in exchange for one of the cosmic containment units, to which they agree.

Armed with Mephisto's information, Warlock and Thanos plan to defeat the Goddess. Thanos gathers the heroes of Earth and the Silver Surfer, who, while initially serving the Goddess, has shaken off her control. The Surfer destroys Paradise Omega's defences, enabling the heroes to land and battle their friends in what becomes a battle to the death. Thanos, boosting his own telepathic powers with those of the comatose Professor X, attacks the Goddess at the moment she activates her plan. Rationalizing that evil will continue to exist while sentient life exists, the Goddess uses the Egg to rewrite existence so that the universe is completely without sentient life.

This, however, proves to be an illusion created by Warlock moments before the Goddess acted to trick her, thus exposing her true goal to her army and depriving her of their loyalty - and the will needed to override the containment unit's safeguards against universal destruction. Caught off-guard, the Goddess is attacked simultaneously by Thanos, Warlock, and Professor X, the three striking her on the spiritual plane as the units cannot affect the soul, and she is absorbed into the Soul Gem. The heroes return to Earth, with their battle undone by the Cosmic Egg, before Thanos ordered it to destroy itself, to ensure that its power could never be used by another. Thanos takes a cosmic containment unit for Mephisto and then destroys Paradise Omega. Mephisto receives his payment but realizes the unit is non-functional, as he failed to specify that the artifact must work.

== Collected editions ==
The series and several tie-ins are collected into two trade paperbacks:

- Volume 1 (collects The Infinity Crusade #1 - 3, Warlock Chronicles #1-3, and Warlock and the Infinity Watch #18-19, 248 pages, December 2008, ISBN 0-7851-3127-2)
- Volume 2 (collects The Infinity Crusade #4 - 6, Warlock Chronicles #4-5, and Warlock and the Infinity Watch #20-22, 248 pages, February 2009, ISBN 0-7851-3128-0)
