= Foton =

Foton may refer to:

- Foton (satellite), two series of Russian scientific satellite and reentry vehicle programs
- Foton Motor, a Chinese commercial vehicle manufacturer based in Beijing
- Foton Tornadoes, a women's volleyball team in the Philippines

== See also ==
- Futon, the Japanese traditional style of bedding
- Photon (disambiguation)
