= The Infinity War =

1992 Marvel Comics series

- Cover of Infinity War 1 (Jun 1992), art by Ron Lim
- Publisher: Marvel Comics
- Publication date: June – November 1992
- Genre: Superhero
Title(s)
Infinity War #1-6
Marvel Comics Presents #108-111
Warlock and the Infinity Watch #7-10
- Main character(s): The Avengers; Avengers West Coast; Fantastic Four; X-Men; X-Factor; New Warriors; Alpha Flight; Infinity Watch; Doctor Doom; Kang; Adam Warlock; Galactus; Eternity

Creative team
- Writer: Jim Starlin
- Artist: Ron Lim
- Infinity War: ISBN 0-7851-2105-6

The Infinity War is a six-issue comic book limited series published by Marvel Comics in 1992. The series was written by Jim Starlin and penciled by Ron Lim, inked by Al Milgrom, colored by Ian Laughlin and Christie Scheele, and lettered by Jack Morelli.

The storyline is a direct sequel to the 1991 The Infinity Gauntlet and was followed by The Infinity Crusade in 1993.

== Publication history ==
The story had additional tie-ins including Alpha Flight #110-112, Captain America #408, Daredevil #310, Deathlok #16, Doctor Strange, Sorcerer Supreme #42-47, Fantastic Four #366-370, Guardians of the Galaxy vol 1 #27-29, Marc Spector: Moon Knight #41-44, Marvel Comics Presents #108-111, The New Warriors #27, Nomad vol. 2, #7, Quasar #38-40, Silver Sable and The Wild Pack #4-5, Silver Surfer vol. 3, #67-69, Sleepwalker #18, Spider-Man #24, Warlock and the Infinity Watch #7-10, and Wonder Man #13-14. All of these were published between July and November 1992. What The--?! #20 featured a parody story about various comedic superheroes struggle against the "Infinity Wart".

== Plot summary ==
When hero Adam Warlock takes possession of the artifact known as the Infinity Gauntlet, he expels the good and evil aspects of his being to become a totally logical being, who can therefore use the Gauntlet wisely. This act recreates his "evil" persona and old foe the Magus, who desires universal conquest and revenge against Warlock and the Titan Thanos. Meanwhile, the effectively emotionless Adam is brought before a "jury" of the cosmic powers and voluntarily surrenders his godhood once he is found to be "guilty" of being unworthy. The Magus collects five cosmic containment units (another name for the Cosmic Cubes), and with the power gained incapacitates the cosmic entity Eternity; creates an interdimensional realm and an army of doppelgängers—evil "mirror" images of Earth's superheroes.

After investigating the energy of the containment units, Thanos discovers the Magus and retreats to warn Warlock. Galactus and several of Earth's heroes also investigate and then attempt to revive Eternity, as the entity will be required to petition the Living Tribunal, who has decreed that the Infinity Gems can no longer be used in unison in the Earth-616 universe. The rationale is that if the Gauntlet can be reactivated, then the Magus can be removed from existence. The Magus sends the doppelgängers to Earth to distract the heroes, and the evil version of Mister Fantastic detonates a gamma bomb when the heroes assemble at Four Freedoms Plaza! Thunder God Thor directs the radiation into space, and a surprise attack by the Magus and the doppelgänger of Thanos has the heroes believing the two characters are now allied.

The story climaxes at the Magus' base: a group of heroes free those who were replaced by doppelgängers; cosmic adventurer Quasar arrives with the Ultimate Nullifier (with Thanos goading Quasar to use it against the Magus knowing that Quasar would also be destroyed) and villains Kang the Conqueror and Doctor Doom appear, hoping to harness the source of the powerful energies detected.

Warlock and the still inactive Gauntlet are captured by the Magus, and both attacked by Doom and Kang. Warlock is defeated and the Magus is severely weakened in the battle and attempts to use the containment units but discovers they have been stolen. Doom betrays and stops Kang, and then demands the Gauntlet from the Magus. Eternity, however, has just been revived and has requested the Gauntlet be reactivated, which the Living Tribunal agrees to. An apparently omnipotent Magus easily defeats Doom and dissolves Quasar, who arrives with the Ultimate Nullifier. Thanos defeats his doppelgänger and distracts the Magus, allowing Warlock to grapple with the villain for the Gauntlet. Warlock releases from the Gauntlet a being that is a composite of the entity Eternity and his twin, Infinity. The being incapacitates the Magus, allowing Warlock to absorb the Magus into the Soul Gem. The experience places Warlock in a coma.

Thanos reveals to the assembled heroes that the Magus was tricked and never gained omnipotence as the Reality Gem on the Gauntlet—which Thanos is revealed to be the secret guardian of—was a convincing fake. The heroes return to Earth and the final page of the last issue reveals that the containment units have been stolen by Warlock's "good" persona, the Goddess. In addition to these developments, Eternity—who is apparently 'deputized' by the Living Tribunal to make such a decree—thereafter declares that the Gems on the Gauntlet will never be able to be used again as a single unit, no matter what future crisis befalls the universe.

== Collected editions ==
Title	Material collected	Publication date	ISBN
Infinity War	The Infinity War #1-6, Warlock and the Infinity Watch #7-10, Marvel Comics Presents #108-111	April 2006	0-7851-2105-6
Infinity War Aftermath	Warlock & The Infinity Watch #11-17, Silver Surfer/Warlock: Resurrection #1-4, Quasar #41-43, material from Marvel Comics Presents #112, Marvel Holiday Special #2, Marvel Swimsuit Special #2	October 2015	978-0785198147
Infinity War Omnibus	Infinity War #1-6; Fantastic Four #366-370; Spider-Man #24; Deathlok (vol. 2) #16; Daredevil #310; Warlock And The Infinity Watch #7-10; Doctor Strange, Sorcerer Supreme #42-47; Silver Surfer (vol. 3) #67-69; Wonder Man (vol. 2) #13-15; Alpha Flight #110-112; Silver Sable & The Wild Pack #4-5; Guardians Of The Galaxy #27-29; Quasar #37-40; New Warriors #27; Marc Spector: Moon Knight #41-44; Nomad (vol. 2) #7; Sleepwalker #18; material from Captain America #408; Alpha Flight #109; Marvel Comics Presents #108-112	April 2019	978-1302915964

== In other media ==
=== Film ===
In October 2014, Marvel announced a two-part film titled Avengers: Infinity War written by Christopher Markus and Stephen McFeely and directed by the Russo brothers. In August 2016, Marvel made an interim announcement that Infinity War might be one film, which it later dropped in preference to its original two-part film plans, Part 2 being renamed Avengers: Endgame. The Russos also explained that despite its title, the film wasn't an adaptation of this storyline, rather primarily based on its predecessor The Infinity Gauntlet. Avengers: Infinity War was released on April 27, 2018.

=== Video games ===
- Capcom adapted the storyline into a video game shortly after its release. Marvel Super Heroes In War of the Gems, was released in 1996 for the Super Nintendo Entertainment System.
- The 2019 video game Marvel Ultimate Alliance 3: The Black Order, a reboot to Marvel: Ultimate Alliance and Marvel: Ultimate Alliance 2 takes elements from The Infinity War storyline and incorporates into its own story.
