= Tom Vincent =

American painter

- Born: January 27, 1956 (age 70)
- Area: Colorist/Painter
- Notable works: Silver Surfer

Tom Vincent (born January 27, 1956) is an American comic book artist and colorist/painter. He is best known for his work for Marvel Comics on the Silver Surfer (vol. 3), which he colored from 1989 to 1995.

Vincent also painted The Thanos Quest, several graphic novels, posters, trading cards, covers and advertising while working for Marvel. Other titles he has contributed to include X-Factor, Thor, Speedball, X-Men Adventures, Nick Fury Agent Of S.H.I.E.L.D., Hellraiser, and many others.

He has also done work on Fish Police for Time Warner Books, and illustrated Robotech, Fish Police, and Grendel for Comico. He has also done work for First Comics, Dark Horse Comics, and Windsor-Smith Studios.

Although he still does occasional comic related work with longtime friend and collaborator Kevin Conrad, Vincent retired from comics in 1997, becoming a web and graphic designer for a national entertainment retailer and then an art director for an Albany, NY advertising agency. He also owns and operates a Wine and Spirits store called The Vineyard Wines & Spirits in Schenectady NY.
