= Marvel Select =

American comic book figurines (produced 2002– )

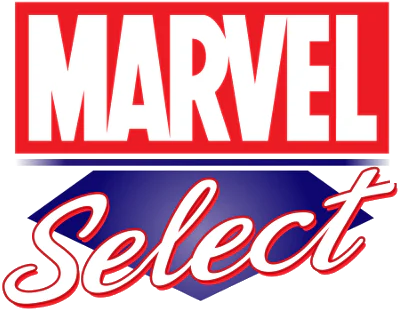
- Type: Action figures
- Company: Diamond Select
- Country: United States
- Availability: 2002–present
- Materials: Plastic
- Features: Marvel Universe; MCU

Marvel Select is a line of 1:10 scale action figures based on characters from the Marvel Universe and Marvel Cinematic Universe manufactured by Diamond Select Toys.

Diamond Select uses the "Select" label for other brands to indicate the 1:10 scale, including Universal Monsters, Star Trek and The Munsters, all of which come in similar packaging.

== History ==
The Marvel Select line was developed by Diamond Select Toys in 2002 with Marvel Comics' toy division, Toy Biz, as a specialty-market counterpart to the larger company's mass-market offerings. Diamond Select handled design, sales and marketing, while Toy Biz handled development and production. At the time, the figures were mostly based on peripheral Ultimate Marvel and Marvel Knights characters, but the line quickly expanded to include core Marvel Universe characters. Diamond Select took over development and production after Toy Biz went defunct.

Early Marvel Select figures focused on sculpting over articulation and typically included detailed, diorama-style bases or accessories that necessitated larger packaging than figures from comparable toy lines. Sometimes, the packaging would even include a second or third figure. These pack-ins helped establish the line as collector-targeted.

Marvel Select's packaging is touted as "display-ready", featuring a large plastic bubble, which allows the figure inside to be seen without opening it. The packaging was originally adorned with distinctive comic artwork of each character. However, beginning in 2021, certain releases saw the traditional comic artwork replaced with promotional photographs of the figures themselves.

The line has received acclaim for its figures of larger characters like the Hulk, which can stand up to ten inches tall. For these releases, bases and accessories were typically reduced in size or omitted completely to accommodate the size of the figures, which could fill the packaging on their own.

Marvel Select eventually expanded to include figures based on the Marvel Cinematic Universe, as well as a small number of Marvel movies by 20th Century Fox and Sony Pictures, particularly the Amazing Spider-Man and Wolverine films. A figure of Mystique was teased at conventions but was ultimately scrapped before production, indicating that the line was planned to expand to the X-Men film series at some point.

Contemporary Marvel Select figures have considerably more articulation than their predecessors. The large diorama-style bases, which were once a staple of the line, are now uncommon for all releases. Instead, smaller accessories and interchangeable parts are included.

== Released ==
Released	Figure	Accessories	Description	Variants
2002	Spider-Man	Burglar webbed to a wall base	Although simply labeled “Spider-Man,” the figure is based on the Ultimate Marvel version	
2002	Punisher	Smashed pinball machine, arsenal of weapons and unarticulated thug victim figure	Based on artwork by Tim Bradstreet from the Marvel Knights imprint	
2002	Elektra	Castle tower display base, ninja arsenal and alternate limbs		
2002	Captain America	Flag, shield and WWII battlefield base	Although simply labeled “Captain America,” the figure is based on the Ultimate Marvel version, wearing his World War II gear	
2002	Black Widow 2	Cave wall base, pistol, rifle, knife and storage drums	Depicts Yelena Belova as Black Widow	
2003	Wolverine: The Origin	Forest display and unarticulated wolves	Based on Origin	
2003	Black Cat	Apartment wall base, safe, jewels and unarticulated crawling Spider-Man		
2003	Ultimate Iron Man	Removable forearm armor and recharging station		
2003	Ultimate Hulk	Unprinted scenic city base		Reissued with a matte gray finish
2003	Ultimate Venom	Unmasked Spider-Man webbed to the wall base and symbiote jar		With emblem
2004	Ultimate Wolverine	Injured Magneto base		
2004	Ultimate Thor	Mjölnir and defeated Giant-Man base		
2004	Green Goblin	Goblin glider, pumpkin bomb and tied-up unmasked unarticulated Spider-Man accessory	Based on artwork by John Romita Sr., specifically The Amazing Spider-Man #39	
2004	Doctor Doom	Goblet hand, pistol and detailed throne with banners		
2005	Spider-Man vs. Doctor Octopus	Removable, flexible tentacles	Doctor Octopus’ design is based on artwork by Staz Johnson from the miniseries Spider-Man/Doctor Octopus: Negative Exposure	
2005	Phoenix	Flame base	Based on Here Comes Tomorrow	Fiery transparent variant
2005	Emma Frost	Hellfire Club fireplace display base with removable fire		Diamond transparent variant
2005	Web of Spider-Man	Rooftop gargoyle base	Based on the cover of Web of Spider-Man #1, featuring Spider-Man in his black costume	
2005	She-Hulk (ToyFare poll winner/convention tour exclusive)	Crushed car		
2005	Ultimate Carnage	Gwen Stacy corpse		
2005	Thanos	Alternate Infinity Gauntlet hand and Death (with separate face-mask)		
2005	Wolverine	Unarticulated Kitty Pryde and wanted poster ruins base	Based on the Days of Future Past story arc/the cover of Uncanny X-Men #141	
2005	The Watcher	Moon stand		
2006	Spider-Woman	Detachable web shot, unarticulated Hydra agents and Hydra mansion base	The Jessica Drew version of Spider-Woman	Clear glider wings, yellow glider wings, first appearance with full cowl
2006	Spider-Woman (2006 SDCC exclusive)	Unarticulated Hydra agents and Hydra mansion base	The Julia Carpenter version of Spider-Woman; repaint of the previous Spider-Woman figure	
2006	Moon Knight	Crescent blades and Khonshu statue		
2006	Cloak and Dagger	Light knives		
2006	Iron Spider (ToyFare exclusive)	Rooftop gargoyle base	Repaint of 2005's Web of Spider-Man figure	
2007	Mephisto	Throne		
2007	Ghost Rider	Fiery highway base		
2007	Alien Legends: Brood and Skrull 2-Pack			
2007	Zombie Spider-Man			
2007	Zombie Colonel America	Removable skull, shield and Silver Surfer buildable base piece		
2007	Zombie Hulk	Silver Surfer buildable base piece		
2007	Skrull Elektra (2010 SDCC exclusive)	Articulated Skrull figure, ninja arsenal and alternate limbs	The main figure is a repaint of 2002's Elektra	
2008	Thor	Mjölnir and Asgard base	Based on Olivier Coipel's Thor design	
2008	Incredible Hulk	Rubble-strewn base		
2008	Iron Man	Blast-off base		
2008	Stealth Iron Man	Blast-off base	Blue repaint of previous Iron Man	
2008	What If...? Captain America (Big Bad Toy Store exclusive)	Blast-off base and shield	Red, white and blue repaint of Iron Man	
2008	Captain America (Bucky Barnes)	Pistol, canteen, sheathed blade and eagle ledge	Bucky Barnes version of Captain America	Unmasked variant
2008	Red Hulk (Big Bad Toy Store exclusive)	Rubble-strewn base	Repaint of Incredible Hulk figure, later reissued as non-exclusive	
2008	Arachne	Hydra agents and Hydra mansion base	The Julia Carpenter version of Arachne, from Best of Marvel Select Series 3. Repaint of 2006's Spider-Woman figure	
2008	Skrull Multi-Pack		From Best of Marvel Select Series 3. Includes three Skrull soldiers, reissued from Brood and Skrull/Skrull Elektra	
2009	Captain Marvel	Crashed Skrull ship base		Genis-Vell variant and Genis-Vell variant in Kree navy uniform with pistol
2009	Anti-Venom	Symbiote base		
2009	Wolverine	Weapon X base		First appearance variant
2009	Brown Uniform Wolverine (Big Bad Toy Store exclusive)	Samurai armor base		
2009	Unmasked Wolverine (Phat Collectibles/Hastings Entertainment exclusive)	Samurai armor base	Same figure as the Big Bad Toy Store exclusive Brown Uniform Wolverine, but with a new head sculpt	
2009	Sabretooth	Damaged Weapon X facility base		
2009	First Appearance Sabretooth (CMDStore.com exclusive)	Damaged Weapon X facility base	Retooling of previous Sabretooth figure	
2009	Daredevil	Cathedral rooftop base		Unmasked variant with loose cowl
2010	Marvel Girl	Half of the X-Mansion gate		Rachel Summers variant
2010	X-Men Origins: Wolverine	Dumpster		
2010	Spider-Man	Destroyed car base		
2010	Iron Man 2: Iron Man Mark VI Armor	Armory base		
2010	Iron Man 2:Iron Man Mark IV Armor (Borders exclusive)	Armory base		
2010	Iron Man 2: War Machine	Hammer armory base	War Machine MK I with a red arc reactor	
2010	Iron Man 2: War Machine (Borders exclusive)	Hammer armory base	War Machine MK I with a blue arc reactor	
2010	Thing	Printed group scene Fantastic Four base		
2010	Abomination	Destroyed ground base		
2010	Deadpool	Rifle, pistol, two swords, two sais and shot-up back alley base		Unmasked variant
2011	Cyclops	Interchangeable mask-less head and Danger Room base		X-Factor variant
2011	Magneto	Destroyed X-Mansion base		Without helmet variant
2011	Juggernaut	Printed rubble base		Without helmet variant
2011	Thor: Loki	Scepter, Heimdall's sword and half of Bifröst gate base		
2011	Thor: The Mighty Avenger	Mjölnir and half of Bifröst gate base	Thor from Thor	
2011	Gambit	Interchangeable hands, charged-cards, staff and Danger Room base		Long-haired variant
2011	Captain America: The First Avenger: Captain America	Shield, pistol and half of a Cosmic Cube base		
2011	Captain America: The First Avenger: Red Skull	Pistol and half of a Cosmic Cube base		
2011	Hawkeye (Disney Store exclusive)	Perched Wasp arrow and slain Ultron base	Hawkeye's classic costume. Originally a Disney Store exclusive, but later saw a wider release	
2011	Thor (Disney Store exclusive)	Mjölnir and rock base	Thor's classic costume. Originally a Disney Store exclusive, but later saw a wider release	
2011	Captain America (Disney Store exclusive)	Shield and platform base	Captain America's classic costume	
2011	Black Widow (Disney Store exclusive)	Ant-Man miniature and slain Ultron base	Costume has a metallic purple sheen	
2012	Colossus	Danger Room base		
2012	Green Goblin	Glider base	A modern take on Green Goblin	
2012	The Avengers: Hulk			
2012	The Avengers: Hawkeye	Bow and Pershing Square railing base		
2012	The Avengers: Chitauri Footsoldier	Pershing Square railing base		
2012	The Avengers: Iron Man	Alternate hands, armory base	Reissue of 2010's Iron Man Mark VI Armor from Iron Man 2	
2012	The Amazing Spider-Man: Lizard			
2012	The Amazing Spider-Man: Spider-Man	Interchangeable hands and awning base		
2012	The Amazing Spider-Man: Unmasked Spider-Man (Disney Store exclusive)	Interchangeable head, alternate hands and awning base		
2012	The Amazing Spider-Man: Metallic Spider-Man (Disney Store exclusive)	Interchangeable hands and awning base		
2012	Ultron	Ant-Man and Wasp (fallen heroes) base		
2012	Storm	Danger Room base with torch attachment		Short hair variant
2012	Unleashed Hulk (Disney Store exclusive)		Based on art by Marc Silvestri. Originally a Disney Store exclusive, but later saw a wider reissue	
2012	Agent Venom (Disney Store exclusive)	Revolver pistol, modern pistol and wreckage base		
2012	Lizard (Disney Store exclusive)	Brick wall and sewer cover base		
2012	Barbarian Hulk			
2012	Rhino			
2013	Venom	Interchangeable hands, alternate heads, extra limbs and multi-headed “backpack” attachment	The Eddie Brock version of Venom, featuring parts based on the Venom: The Madness storyline	
2013	Nightcrawler	Teleportation base		
2013	Iron Man 3: Iron Man Mark XLII Armor	Interchangeable unmasked head, alternate hands and armory base		
2013	Iron Man 3: War Machine	Interchangeable unmasked head, shoulder cannon and armory base		
2013	Iron Man 3: Iron Patriot (Disney Store exclusive)	Interchangeable unmasked head, shoulder cannon and armory base	Repaint of War Machine	
2013	Iron Man 3: Battle Damaged Iron Man Mark XLII Armor (Disney Store exclusive)	Interchangeable unmasked head, alternate hands and armory base	Repaint of regular Mark XLII figure	
2013	The Wolverine	Two interchangeable heads, bone claw hands, adamantium claw hands, sheathed claw hands and a sword	Wolverine as he appears in the film The Wolverine	
2013	Thor: The Dark World: Thor	Mjolnir and half of a rocky display base		
2013	Thor: The Dark World: Jane Foster	Interchangeable aether-possessed head, dark elf sword and half of a rocky display base		
2013	Silver Surfer	Surfboard, energy blasts, alternate hands, infinity gauntlet and energy trail base		
2013	Winter Soldier (Disney Store exclusive)	Pistol, machine gun, sniper rifle, crate and shattered window display base		
2014	The Superior Spider-Man (Disney Store exclusive)	Display base depicting the aftermath of a battle with the Sinister Six team established in The Superior Foes of Spider-Man		
2014	Captain America: The Winter Soldier: Captain America	Shield and helicarrier-inspired display base	Captain America's stealth suit	
2014	Captain America: The Winter Soldier: Unmasked Captain America (Disney Store exclusive)	Masked head, shield with stripped paint and helicarrier-inspired display base	Retooling of the previous Captain America figure	
2014	Captain America: The Winter Soldier: Falcon	Battle damaged helicarrier-inspired display base		
2014	The Amazing Spider-Man 2: Spider-Man	Interchangeable right hand, web lines and awning base	Interchangeable hands, web lines, fire helmet and fire hose nozzle	
2014	The Amazing Spider-Man 2: Spider-Man	Interchangeable right hand, web lines and awning base	Same as previous figure, but with different accessories	
2014	The Amazing Spider-Man 2: Unmasked Spider-Man (Disney Store exclusive)	Interchangeable head, alternate hands and web lines	Same as previous figure, but with different accessories	
2014	Savage Hulk (Disney Store exclusive)	Rubble-strewn base	Based on early appearances of the Hulk	
2014	Black Widow	Ant-Man miniature and slain Ultron base	Black repaint of 2011's Disney Store exclusive Black Widow	
2014	Electro (Disney Store exclusive)	Transformer tower display base	Also available in two-pack with a reissue of 2010's Spider-Man figure	
2014	Zombie Magneto	Rubble base and severed Green Goblin limb		
2014	Bleeding Edge Iron Man (Disney Store exclusive)	Demolished plane wing display base		
2014	Captain America (Disney Store exclusive)	Alternate head, shield and platform base	Captain America's classic costume. Reissue of 2010's Captain America with the addition of an unmasked head	
2015	The Mighty Thor (Disney Store exclusive)	Alternate fist, Mjölnir, spinning Mjölnir accessory and peg stand	Based on Thor's Marvel Now! design by Esad Ribić	
2015	The Mighty Thor	Alternate head and fist, Mjölnir, spinning Mjölnir accessory and peg stand	Same as the Disney Store exclusive but with the addition of a helmet-less alternative head. Based on Thor's Marvel Now! design by Esad Ribić	
2015	Cable	Defeated Stryfe base, pistol, shoulder mounted gun, oversized gun, two large guns and a knife		
2015	Carnage	Interchangeable heads, blades and tendrils		
2015	Iron Man Hulkbuster (Disney Store exclusive)		Based on the art of Adi Granov from The Invincible Iron Man #12 (2006)	
2015	Ant-Man: Ant-Man	Interchangeable hands and unarticulated Ant-Man figurine		
2015	Ant-Man: Ant-Man (Disney Store exclusive)	Interchangeable helmet, hands and unarticulated Ant-Man figurine	Unmasked version of the general release	
2015	Avengers: Age of Ultron: Hulk			
2015	Avengers: Age of Ultron: Thor	Half of rubble base	Repaint of the 2013 figure made for Thor: The Dark World	
2015	Avengers: Age of Ultron: Black Widow	Two escrima sticks, pistol and half of rubble base		
2015	Zombie Sabretooth	Rubble base featuring a damaged chunk of Green Goblin's Goblin Glider		
2015	Doctor Strange	Eye of Agamotto amulet, energy blast and Sanctum Sanctorum window base		
2015	Avenging Hawkeye (Disney Store exclusive)	Alternate head, various trick arrows, compound bow, crossbow pistol and unarticulated Lucky the Pizza Dog	Based on David Aja's design	
2016	The Spectacular Spider-Man (Disney Store exclusive)	Unmasked head, loose mask, interchangeable hands and camera		
2016	Black Panther (Disney Store exclusive)	Tree base		
2016	Avenging Captain America	Shield, Hydra base	A modern interpretation of Captain America	
2016	Captain America: Civil War: Iron Man Mark 46	Interchangeable hands and part of Avengers Facility base		
2016	Captain America: Civil War: Captain America	Shield, interchangeable hands and part of Avengers Facility base		
2016	Captain America: Civil War: Winter Soldier	Rifle, interchangeable hands and part of Avengers Facility base		
2016	Captain America: Civil War: Captain America (Disney Store exclusive)	Alternate head, shield, interchangeable hands and part of Avengers Facility base	Same as the general release, but with the addition of an unmasked head	
2016	Doctor Strange (Disney Store exclusive)	Alternate head, Eye of Agamotto amulet, energy blast and Sanctum Sanctorum window base.	Dr. Charles Benton/Asmodeus Masked variant of previous year's Doctor Strange figure	
2016	Destroyer	Interchangeable Odin head and sword		
2017	Doctor Strange: Doctor Strange	Interchangeable hands, magic sphere and Sanctum Sanctorum window base		
2017	Star-Lord (Disney Store exclusive)	Interchangeable unmasked head and hand, two blasters, rock fragment, jet-flame boots, flight stand and interlocking environment base		
2017	Groot (Disney Store exclusive)	Interlocking environment base		
2017	Drax (Disney Store exclusive)	Battle axe, sword, interchangeable hands and interlocking environment base		
2017	Gamora with Rocket (Disney Store exclusive)	Gamora has three sets of interchangeable hands, a sword, a knife, a laser rifle and two laser pistols; Rocket includes two blasters with the interlocking environment base		
2017	Lady Deadpool	Two katanas, shotgun, waist knife, bazooka, interchangeable hands and base with Headpool		
2017	Planet Hulk (Disney Store exclusive)	Axe and shield		
2017	Spider-Man: Homecoming: Spider-Man	Interchangeable hands and rooftop base		
2017	Spider-Man: Homecoming: Spider-Man (Disney Store exclusive)	Interchangeable hands and rooftop base	Unmasked variant of the general release, does not include masked head	
2017	Daredevil: Daredevil	Interchangeable hands, two-part baton, elevator base and flight stand	Based on his appearance in later episodes of season 2	
2017	Spider-Gwen	Interchangeable hands, defeated robot base and unmasked head		
2018	Guardians of the Galaxy Vol. 2: Star-Lord	Includes articulated Rocket Raccoon, one of Star-Lord's Element guns and two blasters for Rocket		
2018	Guardians of the Galaxy Vol. 2: Drax	Includes articulated Baby Groot, interchangeable hands and two daggers		
2018	Thor Ragnarok: Gladiator Hulk	Alternate head, alternate hands, axe and hammer		
2018	Thor Ragnarok: Thor	Interchangeable hands, swords, and lightning effect pieces		
2018	Thanos (Disney Store exclusive)	Interchangeable head		
2018	Black Panther: Black Panther	Vibranium rock display base and interchangeable hands		
2018	Marvel's Beast	Hanging bar attachment danger room base		
2018	Avengers: Infinity War: Iron Man MK50 (Disney Store exclusive)	Interchangeable hands, two sets of nanotech hand blades and nano repulsor cannon		
2018	Avengers: Infinity War: Spider-Man	Interchangeable hands and articulating mechanical legs	Iron Spider costume	
2018	Avengers: Infinity War: Avengers: Infinity War: Thor & Groot	Interchangeable hands for Thor, Stormbreaker and Groot's handheld video game		
2018	Avengers: Infinity War: Captain America	Grass display base, interchangeable hands and shields		
2018	Venom (Disney Store exclusive)	Interchangeable heads, hands and backpiece tendril attachment	Retooling of 2013's Venom. All alternate heads are based on artwork from specific comics such as Venom: Dark Origin and Venom vs. Carnage	
2019	Ant-Man and the Wasp: Wasp (Disney Store exclusive)	Interchangeable hands and miniature Scott Lang Ant-Man & The Wasp figures		
2019	Ant-Man and the Wasp: Ant-Man (Disney Store exclusive)	Interchangeable hands and miniature Janet van Dyne Wasp, Hank Pym Ant-Man and Sub-Atomic Ant-Man figures		
2019	Rogue	Interchangeable hands and mounted gun Danger Room base		
2019	Psylocke	Psy-blade, psy-energy mask effect, interchangeable head and hands and wing chun dummy attachment Danger Room base		
2019	Sandman	Interchangeable hands, sand spiked hammer, sand spiked flail and sandstorm base		
2019	Captain Marvel: Starforce Captain Marvel	Interchangeable cowl head, hands, blast-off base and Goose	Captain Marvel's green Starforce costume	
2019	Gamerverse: Spider-Man	Alternate hands, spider-drone and web shield		
2020	Spider-Man: Far From Home: Spider-Man (Disney Store exclusive)	Union Jack flag pole and interchangeable hands		
2020	Captain Marvel: Captain Marvel (Disney Store exclusive)	Interchangeable cowl head, hands, energy blasts, two flight stands and Goose	Repaint of 2019's Starforce Captain Marvel	
2020	Avengers: Endgame: Hulk (Disney Store exclusive)	Interchangeable hands		
2020	Avengers: Endgame: Nano-Gauntlet Hulk	Interchangeable hands and Nano-Gauntlet		Does not share a sculpt with the Disney Store exclusive version of Endgame's Hulk despite depicting the same costume
2020	Avengers: Endgame: Thanos (Disney Store exclusive)	Interchangeable forearm with infinity gauntlet and dual-sided blade	Depicts Thanos in his armor	
2020	Avengers: Endgame: Iron Man MK 85	Interchangeable hands, interchangeable forearm with Nano-Gauntlet, snapping fingers hand and Avengers facility base		
2020	Taskmaster (Disney Store exclusive)	Sword, shield, pistol, bow and arrows, interchangeable head and hand		
2020	Black Widow: Taskmaster	Sword, shield, bow and arrows and interchangeable hands		
2020	Carnage (Disney Store exclusive)	Interchangeable heads, interchangeable bladed hands, tendrils and “backpack” attachment	Retooling of 2015's Carnage. Each alternate head is based on specific comic art	
2021	Immortal Hulk	Interchangeable hands, alternate cyborg head	Despite being named "Immortal Hulk", it features a more classic depiction of Hulk than the one in the series The Immortal Hulk.	
2021	The Falcon and the Winter Soldier: Captain America (Disney Store exclusive)	Wing pack, shield and alternate hands		
2021	Winter Soldier (Disney Store exclusive)	Pistol, machine gun, sniper rifle, crate and window diorama	Repaint of 2013's Winter Soldier figure, inspired by The Falcon and the Winter Soldier	
2021	Loki (Disney Store exclusive)	Staff, sword, dagger, interchangeable arms, removable coat and unarticulated Kid Loki	Based on Loki: Agent of Asgard	
2021	Silver Centurion Iron Man	Interchangeable unmasked heads, hands, removable “backpack” and blast effects	The MK VII armor	
2021	Human Torch	Alternate head, fire effects and flame base	Includes parts to change it into the Jim Hammond Human Torch	
2021	Titanium Man	Interchangeable head and hands		
2021	WandaVision: The Scarlet Witch	Interchangeable head, hands and hex effects		
2021	Spider-Man: No Way Home: Spider-Man	Alternate hands and two web lines	The black and gold, inside-out Upgraded Suit	
2022	Hawkeye (Disney Store exclusive)	Alternate head, various trick arrows, compound bow, crossbow pistol and unarticulated Lucky the Pizza Dog	Repaint of 2015's Avenging Hawkeye with a new color scheme inspired by the Hawkeye Disney+ series	
2022	Moon Knight (Disney Store exclusive)	Two crescent darts and Egyptian temple base	Repaint of the 2006 Moon Knight with a new color scheme inspired by the Moon Knight Disney+ series	
2022	Miles Morales (Disney Store exclusive)	Alternate head, alternate hands, spider-sense attachment, two web lines and unarticulated Spider-Ham figurine		
2022	Black Panther (Disney Store exclusive)	Repurposed wall base from 2002's Black Widow 2 figure	Repaint of 2016's Black Panther with a new color scheme inspired by the comics	
2022	Beta Ray Bill	Stormbreaker and swinging Stormbreaker accessory		
2022	Vision	Alternate head, interchangeable hands and blast accessories		
2023	Red Hulk	Interchangeable hands	Retooling of 2021's Immortal Hulk figure	
2023	Super Skrull	Interchangeable hands, alternate head and voice blast effect	Based on the Super Skrull that fought the Illuminati using their combined powers	
2023	Apocalypse	Interchangeable weapon attachments		
2023	Blade	Interchangeable head and hands, knife, sword, club, guns, UV and foldable blade		
2023	Iceman	Interchangeable head, hands and belt, ice blast effects and ice base		
2023	Mister Fantastic	Interchangeable hands, stretched hands, torso extensions, stretched neck, wrap-around base and Ultimate Nullifier		
2023	Invisible Woman	Interchangeable hands, interchangeable invisible forearms, interchangeable invisible legs, forcefield shield, psionic bubble, and psionic blast base		
2024	Crimson Dynamo	Interchangeable hands, alternate unmasked head, blast effects and swappable faceplates for helmet		
2024	Captain America	Two shields, alternate heads and necks, interchangeable hands, removable harness for shield, removable utility belt and loose cowl piece	New edition of Captain America's classic costume, similar in design to 2011's release, but with less prominent scales and brighter colors	
2024	Archangel	Removable, articulated wings, alternate heads and interchangeable hands		
2024	Annihilus			
2024	War Machine			

== Announced ==
- Deadpool & Wolverine: Wolverine.
- Deadpool & Wolverine: Deadpool.

== Disney Store Gift sets ==
All figures were also released individually.

Set	Characters	Universe	Release	Accessories
Fearsome Foes of Spider-Man	Green Goblin	Earth-616	Holiday 2012	
Fearsome Foes of Spider-Man	Lizard	Earth-616	Holiday 2012	
Fearsome Foes of Spider-Man	Spider-Man	Earth-616	Holiday 2012	
Fearsome Foes of Spider-Man	Agent Venom	Earth-616	Holiday 2012	
Electro and Spider-Man	Electro	Earth-616	Summer 2014	2 transformer towers
Electro and Spider-Man	Spider-Man	Earth-616	Summer 2014	2 transformer towers

== Best of Marvel Select ==
"Best of Marvel Select" allowed retailers to re-order popular, sold-out figures, sometimes repainted or repackaged. Arachne and the Skrull Multi-Pack were originally offered in this configuration.

Year	Character	Universe	Description
2006	Green Goblin	Earth-616	
2006	Thanos	Earth-616	
2006	Hulk	Ultimate	
2006	Spider-Man	Ultimate	
2007	Emma Frost	Earth-616	normal
2007	Emma Frost	Earth-616	translucent diamond form
2007	Phoenix	Earth-15104	normal
2007	Phoenix	Earth-15104	translucent orange
2007	Venom	Ultimate	
2008	Hulk	Ultimate	
2008	Iron Man	Ultimate	
2008	Julia Carpenter	Earth-616	Arachne
2008	Punisher	Earth-616	
2008	Skrulls	Earth-616	3-pack
2010	Black Cat	Earth-616	
2010	Doctor Doom	Earth-616	
2010	Thanos	Earth-616	
2011	Hulk	Ultimate	
2011	Hulk	Earth-616	
2011	Red Hulk	Earth-616	
