= Fish Police =

Comic book series published 1985–1991

- Cover of Fish Police Fishwrap issue #2, illustrated by Steve Moncuse.

Publication information
- Publisher: Fishwrap Productions; Comico; Apple Comics; Marvel Comics
- Schedule: Monthly
- Format: Ongoing series
- Genre: Crime; Comedy; Funny animal
- Publication date: June 1985 – 1991
- No. of issues: 26
- Main character(s): Inspector Gill; Angel Jones

Creative team
- Created by: Steve Moncuse
- Written by: Steve Moncuse
- Artist: Steve Moncuse
- Inker: Sam Kieth
- Colorist(s): Tom Vincent, Matt Webb (Comico only)
- Editor: Paul Nagy

Fish Police is a comic book series by American cartoonist Steve Moncuse. The plot centers on law and crime in a fictional underwater metropolis with the protagonist, Inspector Gill, trying to solve various crimes, often Mafia-related, while avoiding being seduced by the buxom Angel Jones. The comic featured several marine species as its characters, while the plots and dialogue were reminiscent of film noir.

Original Fish Police stories were published from 1985 to 1991. Sam Kieth (The Maxx) inked "a single panel and drew a 'Next Issue' pin-up".

== Story ==
The story centers Inspector Gill, a fish detective who, it is hinted at, had once been a human. He is met by a female fish named Angel, who tells him that her uncle has developed a drug called Hairballs. The uncle, Calamari, meets Gill and tells him that he will trade Hairballs for his niece.

== Publication history ==
Fish Police started in 1985 as a self-published black-and-white title by Moncuse through his own Fishwrap Productions. After 11 issues, the title was picked up by Comico in 1987, which reprinted issues #1–4 in a trade titled Hairballs, followed by color reprints of the publication's remaining issues. Comico also printed a special prequel issue, and continued the series with number #12.

After issue #17, Comico went bankrupt. Fish Police was then acquired by Apple Comics, The new series continued the numbering begun by Comico, but the comic reverted to black-and-white. Apple published the title until early 1991, when the run ended with number #26. Apart from the main series, Apple Comics printed an issue #0 which featured an early draft of the stories seen in issues #1–5. In 1992–1993, Marvel Comics reprinted the first six issues in color.

Apple published a six-issue spin-off, Fish Shticks, written by Moncuse and drawn by Steve Hauk, between 1992 and 1993. This series was more gag-based than the original. In 2010, Moncuse began the work on a new Fish Police title, set 20 years after the end of the original. IDW Publishing reprinted the first four Fishwrap issues in a trade in February 2011. A new story written and drawn by Moncuse, titled "F.P.B.C.", appeared in Dark Horse Presents issue #22, published in March 2013.

=== Issues ===
- Fish Police (Fishwrap Productions) #0-11 (June 1985 - November 1987)
- Fish Police Special (Comico) #1 (July 1987)
- Fish Police: Hairballs trade paperback (Comico), collecting #1-5, introduction by Harlan Ellison (October 1987)
- Fish Police (Comico) #5-17 (April 1988 – June 1989) #5-11 are color reprints of the Fishwrap issues
- Fish Police (Apple Comics) #18-26 (August 1989 - Spring 1991) plus issue #0 (1991)
- Fish Police (Marvel Comics) #1-6 color reprints of the original 6 Fishwrap issues (October 1992 – March 1993)

== Critical reception ==
Slings and Arrows Comics Guide called the characters "pleasing" and the art a "clean, open style", but criticized the writing for being "like a glossy dramatisation of a blockbuster, specially designed not to be too upsetting or too taxing". The same publication called Fish Shticks "fresh, funny, and wonderfully human". Harlan Ellison describes it as a series that "turns to gibberish when one attempts to codify it", praising Moncuse's writing style. D. Aviva Rothschild, in Graphic Novels: A Bibliographic Guide to Book-Length Comics, called it "all idea and little execution", saying that "there are too many characters and too many threads of plot", although she praised Moncuse's art.

== Animated series ==
Hanna-Barbera Productions adapted Fish Police into an animated television series that was first broadcast on CBS in 1992, lasting only six episodes over one season. The show was cancelled after only three episodes, with the remaining three episodes not airing in the United States. Fish Police had a decidedly more mature tone than most other animated Hanna-Barbera series, containing innuendo and mild language. It also featured several guest actors, including Ed Asner, John Ritter, Tim Curry, Héctor Elizondo, Buddy Hackett, Megan Mullally, Robert Guillaume, and JoBeth Williams.
