= Photon (comics) =

Photon, in comics, may refer to:

- Monica Rambeau, the female, former leader of the Avengers, also known as Captain Marvel
- Genis-Vell, the son of Mar-Vell, also formerly known as Legacy and Captain Marvel
- Photon, a member of Youngblood
- Jason Dean, the villain who murdered Nova's uncle Ralph Rider

== See also ==
- Photon (disambiguation)
