= Photon (disambiguation) =

A photon is an elementary particle of light.

Photon may also refer to:

== Arts and entertainment ==
- Photon (comics), two superheroes in the Marvel Comics universe, both formerly known as "Captain Marvel"
  - Photon (Image Comics), a comic book superhero from Image Comics
- Photon: The Idiot Adventures, a Japanese animated video series
- Photon: The Ultimate Game on Planet Earth, the original lasertag game
  - Photon (TV series), a short-lived television show tied into the game

== Computers and smartphones ==
- Photon, the codename of Microsoft's Windows Phone operating system
- Photon OS, an operating system released by VMWare
- Motorola Photon, a Motorola smartphone

== Music ==
- Photon (EP), an EP by Bailter Space
- Photon (album), a 2002 album by Japanese duo Boom Boom Satellites
- Photon, a song by VNV Nation from the album Automatic

== Other uses ==
- Photon, the Higonnet and Moyroud's Lumitype
- Photon, a satellite bus developed by Rocket Lab
- Photon (arcade cabinet), a Soviet arcade cabinet

== See also ==
- Foton (disambiguation)
