= Death (Marvel Comics) =

Fictional character in Marvel Comics comic books

- Artwork from Ben Reilly: Scarlet Spider #7 (September 2017). Art by Will Sliney.

Publication information
- Publisher: Marvel Comics
- First appearance: Captain Marvel #26 (June 1973)
- Created by: Mike Friedrich; Jim Starlin

In-story information
- Species: Abstract entity
- Place of origin: Realm of Death
- Partnerships: Thanos; Deadpool; Ben Reilly
- Notable aliases: Spectre of Death; Mistress Death; Grim Reaper; Dark Beauty
- Abilities: Cosmic entity physiology granting: Near-Omnipotence; Near-Omniscience; Immortality; Vast cosmic powers: Energy manipulation; Matter manipulation; Time manipulation; Reality warping; Shapeshifting; Teleportation; Necromancy

Altered in-story information for adaptations to other media
- Partnerships: Agatha Harkness

Death is a character appearing in American comic books published by Marvel Comics. Created by Mike Friedrich and Jim Starlin, the character first appeared in Captain Marvel #26 (June 1973). Death is based on the personification of death. She is a nigh-omnipotent cosmic entity and a fundamental constant of mortal existence, depicted as the "twin" of Oblivion, and "sister" and antithetical force to Eternity.

Death typically appears as a skeletal figure cloaked in a black hood, occasionally taking the form of a woman with black hair, who pursues close (sometimes-romantic/sexual) relationships with Thanos, Deadpool, and Ben Reilly. The character is also known as Mistress Death and Lady Death.

Since her original introduction in comics, the character has been featured in various other Marvel-licensed products, including video games, animated television series, and merchandise. The character made her live-action debut in the Marvel Cinematic Universe (MCU) miniseries Agatha All Along (2024), portrayed by Aubrey Plaza.

== Publication history ==
=== 1970s ===
Death debuted in Captain Marvel #26 (June 1973), created by Mike Friedrich and Jim Starlin. She appeared in the 1973 War Is Hell series. She forces soldier John Kowalski to undergo a number of lives and deaths as punishment for doing nothing to prevent the invasion of Poland. She appeared in the 1973 Ghost Rider series and posed as "Death Ryder" to test Johnny Blaze.

=== 1980s ===
In the 1980s, she appears in Contest of Champions, Secret Wars II, and Silver Surfer.

=== 1990s ===
In the 1990s, Death perceives an imbalance in the universe and a gradual shift towards life rather than death, and so in The Thanos Quest resurrects Thanos so that he may collects the Infinity Gems, attempt converse with Death on her own level, and in The Infinity Gauntlet, wipe out half the beings in the universe from existence as proof of his love for Death.

She is also featured in the 1997 Deadpool series. Death is one of the two protagonists alongside Deadpool in the 1998 Deadpool and Death Annual one-shot, her first comic book.

=== 2000s ===
In the 2000s, she appears in Deadpool, Captain Marvel, Avengers: Celestial Quest, Marvel: The End, and Annihilation, admitting to Deadpool in the former and Thanos in the latter three that she does feel "love" for them both.

=== 2010s ===
In the 2010s, she appeared in The Thanos Imperative and Chaos War (both 2010), and Ben Reilly: The Scarlet Spider and Thanos (both 2017–2018).

=== 2020s ===
She appeared in the 2022 Thanos: Death Notes one-shot.

== Fictional character biography ==
Death, on the cover of The Death of Captain Marvel (1982). Art by Jim Starlin.

Death is an abstract entity, embodiment of life ending in the Marvel Universe, and the opposite of Eternity, embodiment of the universe. Death is predominantly depicted as a skeleton cloaked in a black or purple robe, and at times appears as a Caucasian human female.

A storyline in the title Captain Marvel showcases Thanos' scheme to conquer the universe, as the character becomes determined to prove his love for Death by destroying all life. Although Thanos obtains the artifact the Cosmic Cube and succeeds in taking control of the universe, Death abandons the character when he is defeated by the combined might of Captain Marvel, Drax the Destroyer and the Avengers. Two Marvel Annuals feature Thanos as he tries to "woo" Death back (courtesy of the Infinity Gems with which he plans to extinguish every star in the galaxy), but is killed in a final battle with the Avengers, Captain Marvel (Mar-Vell), and Adam Warlock. When Mar-Vell is stricken with terminal cancer, Thanos returns to the character in a vision and introduces him to the entity Death. Mar-Vell willingly surrenders his life and embraces the entity.

In Marvel's first limited series Contest of Champions, Death agrees to a game of strategy with the Elder of the Universe the Grandmaster. The Grandmaster wins the game and Death provides him with the power (via the Golden Globe of Life) to resurrect the Collector, a fellow Elder. Only then does Death reveal that the Golden Globe is an empty instrument that needs to be powered by a life-force equal to that of the being who is to be restored. To resurrect the Collector, the Grandmaster sacrifices his life and takes the Collector's place in the Realm of the Dead. In the limited series Secret Wars II the entity Beyonder takes human form and visits Earth. It decides to "save" mankind, and in doing so destroys Death. The Beyonder is then shown there is a need for Death and transforms his friend, a human reporter named Dave, into Death's new personification.

In an Avengers Annual, the Grandmaster reveals his sacrifice was a ruse as he's able to steal Death's powers and via another deception tricks the entity into banishing all Elders from the Realm of the Dead, effectively rendering them immortal. The threads of this storyline continue in the title Silver Surfer where a group of 11 Elders conspires to use the Infinity Gems to kill the cosmic entity Galactus and thereby destroy reality itself. After their plan is thwarted, Galactus devours 5 Elders, assuming that his status as a being who transcends Death and Eternity means that he does not have to abide by Death's vow. However, Galactus finds the Elders difficult to absorb and Death is displeased that Galactus has chosen to ignore her vow. Subsequently, when three Elders – the Astronomer, Possessor, and Trader – threaten to use the Infinity Gems to prevent the In-Betweener from hurling Galactus (with their brother Elders still inside him) into a black hole, the conceptual being responds by summoning Death and forcing her to negate the 3 Elders against her will, a transgression that Death finds heinous.

The limited series The Thanos Quest, reveals that Death perceives an imbalance in the universe and a gradual shift towards life rather than death; the entity resurrects Thanos. Thanos successfully collects the Infinity Gems, and attempts to converse with Death on its own level. The irony is the character is now superior to Death, and as such Death may not speak with him (a fact relayed via one of Death's minions). The story continues in a consecutive limited series The Infinity Gauntlet, in which Thanos then wipes half the beings in the universe from existence as proof of his love for Death; the entity remains and watches as he battles Earth's heroes, but after they are defeated, Death joins the cosmic pantheon in trying to defeat Thanos. Though the cosmic entities are unsuccessful, Thanos eventually loses the Infinity Gems and is defeated.

The mercenary Deadpool is depicted having a humorous exchange with the entity in a Deadpool Annual. He becomes infatuated with Death after having a number of near-death experiences. During the Funeral for a Freak storyline, Death appears to reciprocate the feeling, and a jealous Thanos prevents Deadpool from dying and joining the entity by cursing him with immortality. In the second volume of Captain Marvel, Death reunites with Thanos to confront the Death God Walker, who tries unsuccessfully to court Death. Death hides within the body of Marlo Chandler (girlfriend of Rick Jones) in an attempt to escape Walker. The entity eventually destroys Walker and then leaves the body of Marlo, although Marlo retains a connection to Death which (in extreme circumstances) allows her to access the cosmic powers of Death.

The limited series Avengers: Celestial Quest continues to explore the relationship between Death and Thanos. As the entity reveals to Thanos that their energies merged when he was resurrected, creating an offspring called the Rot. Death and Thanos work together to destroy their offspring, and it is at this time that Death finally addresses Thanos and admits to feeling "love" for him. The pair also share a kiss in the limited series Marvel: The End, moments before Thanos, possessing the artifact the Heart of the Universe, recreates the universe minus a critical flaw that would have destroyed it.

During the limited series Annihilation, Thanos joins the fight to stop the Annihilation Wave, and during the war is killed by his old foe Drax the Destroyer. When the hero Nova is near death from injuries sustained in battle, he glimpses Death and Thanos standing together watching him. The second volume of the Guardians of the Galaxy features a new development: Phyla-Vell, the heroine Quasar, agrees to become the new avatar of Oblivion (an aspect of Death) in exchange for the freedom of lover Heather Douglas.

In The Thanos Imperative, the Captain Marvel of the Cancerverse, called Lord Mar-Vell, using a ritual to the Many-angled ones that involves sacrificing the Avatar of Death, is able to destroy Death's M-body and remove her from his universe. In the last issue of this 6-part mini-series, it is revealed that Thanos, upon coming back to life, has been completely removed from the realm of death and can no longer die. In a twist he appears to accept Mar-Vell's proposal to be a sacrifice so the Many-angled ones can invade the 616 universe; however, this proves a trap set by Death herself in order to get close to Mar-Vell. By destroying him, she kills every living thing in the Cancerverse, initiates its and the Fault's collapse, and even injures the Many-angled ones to such a degree that it will take them eons to heal.

During the Chaos War storyline, Daimon Hellstrom mentions to Hercules that Death has fled their reality upon Amatsu-Mikaboshi triumphing in the realms of the dead, causing the souls of the deceased to be unleashed upon the Earth, and rendering the victims of the siege, whose injuries might otherwise prove fatal, locked in a deathless limbo.

Following the Dead No More: The Clone Conspiracy storyline, Death has appeared in Las Vegas under the guise of Marlo Chandler to talk with Ben Reilly – the clone of Spider-Man, recently brought back to life and spending some time acting as the new Jackal – initially instructing him to go after a duo of teen punks randomly shooting civilians around the city, claiming that she is testing what he will do about this discovery. Ben manages to find the criminals, shooting one of them twice with his own gun but avoiding causing fatal injuries, but when he is attacked by his "brother" and fellow clone Kaine after the death of a girl Reilly had been trying to treat for a serious illness, Marlo appears and kills Kaine with a single touch. "Marlo" subsequently identifies herself as Death and explains that she has developed an "interest" in Reilly (greater than that she has in Deadpool or Thanos) as no other person has been brought back to life so often. She reveals that he has "died" so many times that his soul has become corrupted and if he undergoes one more resurrection, he will likely suffer so much spiritual damage that his soul will be broken for good. She offers Reilly the chance to restore Cassandra Mercury's daughter Abigail or Kaine to life before she departs. When Reilly asks her to save both of them and kill him instead, Death not only heals the other two, but also restores Reilly to a healthy physical appearance. Death also affirms that he has made a start on his efforts to redeem himself of his sins as the Jackal and to become a hero again. However, after Reilly brutally beats a civilian who was responsible for the theft of food donations to a charity drive, Death reveals that the healing of his scars only remains so long as Reilly does not compromise his status as a hero, with the aforementioned beating leading to him regaining scars around his right eye.

== Powers and abilities ==
Death is an immortal and powerful cosmic entity embodying the concept of mortality and lacking a true physical form. The abstract being holds near-infinite knowledge and power, allowing for manipulation of time and reality. With absolute control over death, the entity can kill or resurrect any individual. To interact with lesser beings, Death sometimes adopts the appearance of a humanoid female. The character resides in a pocket dimension called the Realm of Death.

== Reception ==
=== Critical reception ===
Kayleigh Donaldson of Syfy stated, "It's no wonder that modern pop culture has enjoyed fleshing out its grim heroes beyond their skeletal foundations. [..] In Marvel Comics, Lady Death's power is so alluring, and the woman herself so hypnotically sexy, that Thanos tries to destroy half of all living beings in the universe just to impress her." Deirdre Kaye of Scary Mommy called Death a "role model" and "truly heroic." Nat Brehmer of Screen Rant asserted, "Many fans were expecting, or at least hoping, to see Death in Infinity War because of her ties to Thanos." Via Erhard of Game Rant ranked Death 2nd in their "7 Most Iconic Marvel Gods & Goddesses" list.

Marco Vito Oddo of Collider referred to Death as a "fan-favorite cosmic entity," and ranked her 4th in their "19 Most Powerful Marvel Characters" list. Marc Buxton of Den of Geek ranked Death 12th in their "Guardians of the Galaxy 3: 50 Marvel Characters We Want to See" list, saying, "Where there is Thanos, there is Death. Thanos' beloved, the hooded embodiment of the end, should make an appearance before the Thanos saga is over. Something about that cloaked figure and her skull visage standing next to Thanos is so iconic. Death's inclusion would make audiences understand (and fear) Thanos as he tries to burn a galaxy to win her love."

Johnny Brayson and Nola Pfau of Bustle ranked Death 8th in their "37 Most Powerful Characters In The Marvel Universe" list. Chris Hinton of Looper ranked Death 7th in their "Strongest Supervillains In History" list. Mark Langshaw of WhatCulture ranked Death 9th in their "10 New MCU Characters To Look Out For In 2018 " list.

Screen Rant included Death in their "Eternity And 9 Other Crucial Cosmic Entities In Marvel Comics" list, in their "15 Villains Too Powerful For The MCU (And 15 Current Villains Who Are Way Too Weak)" list, and ranked her 19th in their "Marvel Vs DC: The 25 Most Powerful Gods" list. CBR.com ranked Death 1st in their "Marvel: The 10 Strongest Female Gods" list, 1st in their "Marvel: The 10 Strongest Female Villains" list, 1st in their "10 Most Evil Supervillain Couples In Marvel" list, 3rd in their "19 Most Powerful Cosmic Marvel Characters" list, 8th in their "10 Smartest Gods In Marvel Comics" list, and 10th in their "10 Bravest Gods In Marvel Comics" list.

== Other versions ==
=== Earth X ===
An alternate universe variant of Death appears in Earth X. This version tricked Thanos into believing she is his mother using the knowledge that his birth mother was a Skrull. Upon discovering the truth, he uses the Ultimate Nullifier to destroy Death.

=== Mort the Dead Teenager ===
A male incarnation of Death appears in Mort the Dead Teenager. This version is the father of Teen Death.

== In other media ==
=== Television ===
Death, renamed Lady Chaos due to Fox's broadcast standards, appears in Silver Surfer, voiced by Lally Cadeau. This version is the personification of chaos who is imprisoned in a statue.

=== Marvel Cinematic Universe ===
Death appears in media set in the Marvel Cinematic Universe (MCU).

- The entity's likeness is depicted in the film Guardians of the Galaxy within temple murals dedicated to it and others like it.
- A statue of Lady Death appears in the film Thor: Love and Thunder.
- Death appears in the Disney+ miniseries Agatha All Along, portrayed by Aubrey Plaza. This version is a former lover of Agatha Harkness. Throughout the miniseries, she assumes form of a Green Witch named Rio Vidal in an attempt to kill Billy Maximoff who gained a second life, but Harkness takes the former's place which spares Maximoff.

=== Video games ===
- Death appears as a non-playable character (NPC) in Deadpool, voiced by April Stewart.
- Death appears as a NPC in Marvel vs. Capcom: Infinite, voiced by Alicyn Packard.
- Death appears in Marvel Snap.
- Death appears as a tarot card in Marvel's Midnight Suns.

=== Miscellaneous ===
- Death appears in Marvel TL;DR, voiced by Olivia Dei Cicchi.
- In 2024, Funko released a Rio Vidal / Death Funko Pop figure inspired by the Marvel Cinematic Universe (MCU) incarnation of the character.

== See also ==
- Hela (character)
- Death (personification) (Four Horsemen of the Apocalypse)
- Azrael (Angel of Death)
- Death of the Endless
