= Lord Chaos =

Comics name

Lord Chaos, in comics, may refer to:

- Lord Chaos (DC Comics), a DC Comics character from a future timeline, the son of Donna Troy and Terry Long
- Lord Chaos (Marvel Comics), a Marvel Comics cosmic entity
