= Ron Lim =

American comic artist

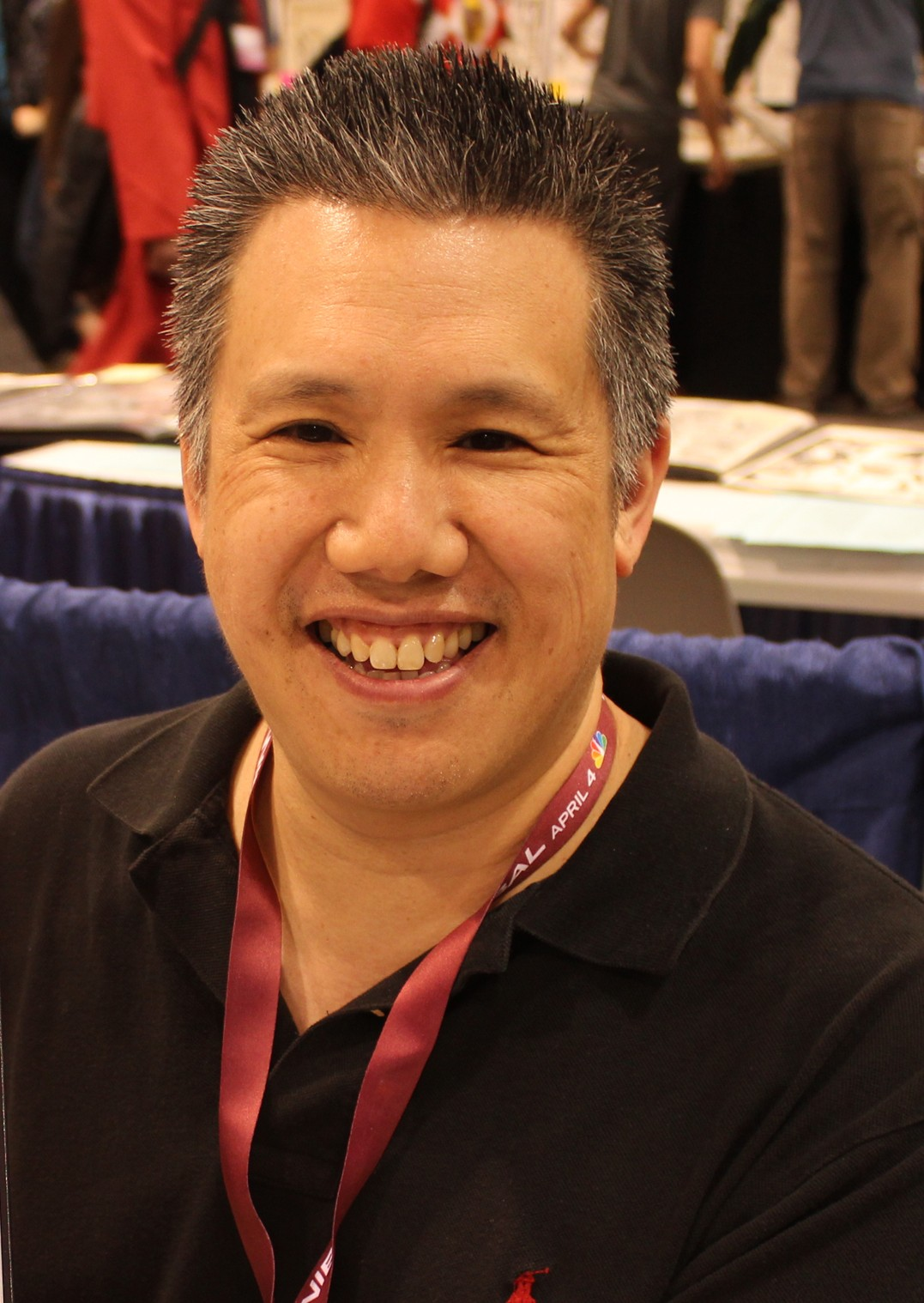
- Lim at WonderCon 2013
- Born: Ronald Lim; 1965 (age 60–61)
- Area: Penciller
- Notable works: Silver Surfer (vol. 3); The Thanos Quest; Infinity Gauntlet; Infinity War; Infinity Crusade; X-Men 2099

Ronald Lim (born 1965) is an American comic book artist living in Sacramento, California. He is best known for his work for Marvel Comics on their various "cosmic" titles, most particularly the Silver Surfer (vol. 3) series.

== Biography ==
Lim's interest in comics began as a child, when he read comics and drew his favorite heroes, including Batman and the Fantastic Four.

His first published work was for the independent comic title called Shadow Star issue #3 which was the first ever release from long time Independent publisher Slave Labor Graphics. followed by The Eradicators' (Silverwolf Comics) May 1986 (indicia). The success of Eradicators issue #1 gave Lim the opportunity to publish his own creation Ex-Mutants, for which he worked on from 1986 to 1988.

He was "discovered" by Marvel at a 1987 comic convention, and was hired on the spot. Lim penciled the Silver Surfer (vol. 3) series for almost six years (1988–94). He also penciled most of the "Infinity" trilogy of large-scale crossover limited series which Marvel published in the early 1990s—Infinity Gauntlet (1991), Infinity War (1992), and Infinity Crusade (1993). He returned to these characters to pencil the Thanos series in 2004.

He was also a regular artist on Captain America in 1990–1991, while he was also working regularly on Silver Surfer. Other Marvel series he worked on during the 1990s include X-Men 2099 (1993), for which he pencilled the first 31 issues and most of the covers, Spider-Man Unlimited, Dragon Lines (1993), and Venom: Lethal Protector (1993).

While Lim primarily worked at Marvel, he also worked at DC for a time in the late 1990s, providing art for the third and final year of Chris Claremont's Sovereign Seven series. He also provided cover art & fill-in interiors for series like Hawkman, Green Lantern (vol.3) and Flash (vol. 2).

He has done work for the Sonic the Hedgehog franchise at Archie Comics, including Sonic #100.

In 1999 he was attached as artist to a failed revival of G.I. Joe to be published by Bench Press Comics with Larry Hama attached as writer.

Lim was a founding contributor to the ill-fated publisher Future Comics, and in 2002 penciled their fourth series, Metallix, for six issues.

Lim returned to Marvel in the 2000s illustrating several series associated with Marvel and Tom DeFalco's MC2 imprint, including Avengers Next, J2 and the Fantastic Five. He contributed art in 2007 to the comic adaptation of Laurell K. Hamilton's Guilty Pleasures, and since 2016 has been regularly providing variant covers for various Marvel one-shots, mini-series and event comics.

== Bibliography ==
Interior pencil art on (unless otherwise noted):

=== Amazing Comics ===
- Amazing Comics Premieres #5 (1987)
- Ex-Mutants #2–5 (1987)

=== Apex Comics Group ===
- The R.I.G.H.T. Project #1 ("The M@n Meets the R.I.G.H.T. Project" short story) (2023)

=== Archie Comics ===
- Sonic the Hedgehog #85, 90–92, 94–102, 105–111, 114, 116, 118–119, 121, 125, 127, 131, 135–136, 145–146, 153–154, 157–159 (2000–2006)
- Sonic Super Special #13 (2000)

=== Boom Studios ===
- Zombie Tales (anthology) (2005)
- Zombie Tales: Oblivion (anthology) (2005)
- Zombie Tales: The Dead (anthology) (2006)

=== DC ===
- Action Comics #1,000,000 (1998)
- Adventures of Superman #539 (1996)
- Countdown #25, 17 (2007–2008)
- Detention Comics #1 (Superboy) (1996)
- Flash (vol. 2) #105, 163 (1995–2000)
- Flash 80-Page Giant #2 (1999)
- Flash Secret Files #2 (1999)
- Green Arrow (vol. 3) #57 (2005)
- Green Lantern (vol. 3) #65, 112, 114, 127, Annual #7 (1995–2000)
- Green Lantern/Flash: Faster Friends #1 (among others) (1996)
- Hawkman (vol. 3) #21 (1995)
- Mystery in Space #6–8 (2007)
- Rann/Thanagar: Holy War #1–8 (2008)
- Sovereign 7 #11, 13–14, 17–19, 21–36 (1996–1998)
- Superman 80-Page Giant #3 (2000)
- Superman: The Man of Steel #64 (1996)
- Supermen of America #1 (among others) (1999)

==== DC Comics / Marvel Comics ====
- Silver Surfer/Superman #1 (1996)

==== Wildstorm ====
- Future Cop: L.A.P.D (promo) (1998)

=== Eternity Comics ===
- Ex-Mutants #1 (1986)

=== First Comics ===
- Badger #34–36, 40–51 (1987–1989)
- Nexus #40 (1987)

=== Future Comics ===
- Metallix #1–6, 0 (2002–2003)

=== Image ===
- Randy O'Donnell is the M@n #1–3 (2001)
- Stormwatch #27–29 (1995)

=== Innovation Comics ===
- Hero Alliance (vol. 2) #1–3 (1989)

=== Marvel ===
- A+X #11 (2013)
- All-New X-Men #1MU (Monster Unleashed) (2017)
- Amazing Spider-Man #388 (Venom story); Annual #22 (backup "The High Evolutionary") (1988, 1994)
- Anita Blake: The Laughing Corpse – Book One #1–5 (artist) (2008–2009)
- Anita Blake: The Laughing Corpse—Executioner #1–5 (artist) (2009–2010)
- Anita Blake: The Laughing Corpse – Necromancer #1–5 (artist) (2009)
- Anita Blake, Vampire Hunter: Circus of the Damned – The Charmer #1–5 (artist) (2010)
- Anita Blake, Vampire Hunter: Circus of the Damned – The Ingenue #1–5 (artist) (2011)
- Anita Blake, Vampire Hunter: Circus of the Damned – The Scoundrel #1–5 (artist) (2011–2012)
- Anita Blake, Vampire Hunter: Guilty Pleasures #8–12 (artist) (2008)
- Avengers Annual #17 (backup "The High Evolutionary"); Annual #21 (1988, 1992)
- Avengers Next #1–5 (2006–2007)
- Avengers Vs. Infinity #1 (2015)
- Avengers: Loki Unleashed #1 (2019)
- Cable & Deadpool #29, 39, 43–44, 47 (2006–2007)
- Captain America #366, 368–378, 380–386 (1989–1991)
- Captain America (vol. 2) #13 (1997)
- Captain America (vol. 9) Annual #1 (2018)
- Captain America & Thor: Avengers #1 (2011)
- Captain Marvel (vol. 4) #4 (2000)
- Carnage #1 (2022)
- Conan the Barbarian #232–235 (1990)
- Cosmic Powers #1 (Thanos); #4 (Legacy) (1994)
- Cosmic Powers Unlimited #1 (Captain Marvel story) (1995)
- Daredevil #258 (1988)
- Doctor Strange, Sorcerer Supreme #25 (1990)
- Excalibur #8, 20, 26 (1989–1990)
- Excalibur: Air Apparent oneshot (among others) (1991)
- Excalibur: XX Crossing oneshot (among others) (1992)
- Fantastic Five (vol. 2) #1–5 (2007)
- Fantastic Four #321, 336; Annual #21 (backup "The High Evolutionary") (1988–1990)
- Fantastic Four (vol. 2) #11, 12 (1997)
- Fantastic Four (vol. 3) #1/2 (1998)
- Generation X #73, 75 (2001)
- Hercules: Twilight of a God #1–4 (2010)
- Heroes Reborn: Peter Parker, the Amazing Shutterbug #1 (2021)
- Infinity Crusade #1–6 (1993)
- Infinity Gauntlet #4–6 (1991)
- Infinity War #1–6 (1992)
- Iron Man: Legacy of Doom #1–4 (2008)
- Iron Man 2: Public Identity #1–3 (2010)
- Iron Man: The Coming of the Melter oneshot (2013)
- J2 #1–12 (1998–1999)
- Marvel Age Spider-Man Team-Up #4 (2004)
- Marvel Comics Presents #17–24 (Cyclops) (1988–1989)
- Marvel Graphic Novel: Avengers: Death Trap, The Vault SC (1991)
- Marvel Holiday Special #1 (Captain America); #2 (Thanos); #3 (Hulk) (1991–1993)
- Marvel Holiday Special 2006 (2006)
- Marvel Superheroes #1 (Black Panther) (1990)
- Marvel's The Avengers: The Avengers Initiative #1 (2012)
- Marvel's The Avengers: Black Widow Strikes #2 (2012)
- Marvel's Thor: The Dark World Prelude #2 (2013)
- Mighty Morphin' Power Rangers #1–2, 4–6 (1995–1996)
- Mighty Morphin' Power Rangers: The Movie oneshot (1995)
- Mutant X #26, 28, 30–32 (2000–2001)
- Namor the Sub-Mariner Annual #2 (1992)
- New Mutants Annual #4 (backup "The High Evolutionary") (1988)
- Nightwatch #1–3 (1994)
- Psi-Force #16–22 (1987–1988)
- Secret Empire #10 (artist, among others) (2017)
- Silver Surfer (vol. 3) #15–20, 22–31, 33–38, 40–57, 60–65, 73–82, 89, 91, 92; Annual #1–5, 7 (1988–1994)
- Silver Surfer: Rebirth #1–5 (2022)
- Silver Surfer Rebirth: Legacy #1–4 (2023)
- Skaar: Son of Hulk #8–12 (2009–2010)
- Solo Avengers #4, 12–13 (Hawkeye) (1987–1988)
- Spectacular Spider-Man Annual #8 (backup "The High Evolutionary") (1988)
- Spider-Man 2099 #18, 44, Annual #1 (1994–1996)
- Spider-Man Family #1 (Spider-Girl) (2005)
- Spider-Man: Friends & Enemies #1–4 (1994–1995)
- Spider-Man: Maximum Clonage Alpha #1 (1995)
- Spider-Man Unlimited #1–9 (1993–1995)
- Spygal: Secret Life of a Smooth Operator #2 (artist, among others) (2013)
- Thanos #7–12 (2004)
- Thanos (vol. 2) #13 (2017)
- Thanos Annual #1 (2014)
- Thanos: Death Notes #1 (2023)
- Thanos Quest #1–2 (1990)
- Thor Annual #14 (1989), #411–413 (Beta Ray Bill backup) (1989–1990)
- United States of Captain America #4 (2021)
- Venom #150 (2017)
- Venom (vol. 2) #25, 35, Annual #1 (2019–2021)
- Venom: First Host #2–4 (2018)
- Venom: Lethal Protector #4–6 (1993)
- Venom: Nights of Vengeance #1–4 (1994)
- Warlock: Rebirth #1–5 (2023)
- Web Of Spider-Man Annual #4 (backup "The High Evolutionary") (1988)
- West Coast Avengers Annual #3 (backup "The High Evolutionary") (1988)
- What If...? (vol. 2) #6, 14, 22 (1989–1990)
- Wild Thing #1–5 (1999)
- X-Men Annual #12 (backup "The High Evolutionary") (1988)
- X-Men 2099 #1–31 (1993–1996)
- X-Men Forever 2 #7–8 (2010)

==== Epic ====
- Dragon Lines #1–4 (1993)
- Dragon Lines: The Way of the Warrior #1–2 (1993)

=== Pied Piper ===
- Ex-Mutants #6–8 (1987)
- Ex-Mutants Microseries: Erin #1 (1987)
- The New Humans #1 (1987)
- Pied Piper Graphic Album #1 - Hero Alliance: End of the Golden Age (1986)

=== Silverwolf ===
- The Eradicators #1 (1986)

=== Slave Labor ===
- Shadow Star #3 (1986)

=== Topps ===
- Dragonheart #1–2 (1996)
- Return to Jurassic Park #9 (one page) (1996)
- Xena: Warrior Princess & Joxer: Warrior Prince #1–3 (1997–1998)
- Xena and the Original Olympics #1–3 (1998)

=== Wonder Color ===
- Hero Alliance #1 (1987)
