= Silver Surfer (comic book) =

Comic book

- Cover of the Silver Surfer #1 (August 1968). Art by John Buscema and Joe Sinnott.

Publication information
- Publisher: Marvel Comics
- Format: List: vol. 1 ongoing series vol. 2 one-shot vol. 3 ongoing series vol. 4 limited series vol. 5 ongoing series vol. 6 limited series vol. 7 ongoing series vol. 8 ongoing series
- Genre: Science fiction, superhero
- Publication date: List: vol. 1 August 1968 – September 1970 vol. 2 June 1982 vol. 3 July 1987 – November 1998 vol. 4 December 1988 – January 1989 vol. 5 September 2003 – December 2004 vol. 6 April 2011 – August 2011 vol. 7 May 2014 – December 2015 vol. 8 January 2016 – October 2017
- No. of issues: List: vol. 1 18 vol. 2 1 vol. 3 147 (#1–146 and #-1) and 8 Annuals vol. 4 2 vol. 5 14 vol. 6 5 vol. 7 15 vol. 8 14
- Main character(s): Silver Surfer; Galactus

Creative team
- Written by: (vol. 1); Stan Lee (vol. 2); Stan Lee & John Byrne (vol. 3); Steve Englehart (1–20, 22–31, Annual #1–2), Marshall Rogers (21 w Michael Higgins), Jim Valentino (32–33), Jim Starlin (34–48, 50, Annual #3), Ron Marz (42–43, 49, 51–102, Annual #3–7), Glenn Greenberg (103, 124–125, 146), Mike Lackey (101–102, 104–110), George Pérez (111–123), J.M. DeMatteis (-1, 123, 125–145, Annual #1997) (vol. 4); Stan Lee (vol. 5); Dan Chariton (vol. 6); Greg Pak (vol. 7); Dan Slott (vol. 8); Dan Slott

Collected editions
- Silver Surfer Omnibus: ISBN 0-7851-2753-4

Silver Surfer or The Silver Surfer is the name of several series of comic books published by Marvel Comics featuring the Silver Surfer.

== Publication history ==
=== Volume 1 ===
The first series, The Silver Surfer, was published beginning in 1968 and was written by Stan Lee with art by John Buscema (#1–17) and Jack Kirby (#18). Villains introduced in the series include Mephisto in issue #3 (Dec. 1968). Spider-Man guest-starred in issue #14 (March 1970). Encounters with Thor, Loki, and The Human Torch are also some of the notable things that take place within this volume. The series ended after 18 issues, running from August, 1968 to September, 1970.

The Silver Surfer : The Ultimate Cosmic Experience by Stan Lee, Jack Kirby, and Joe Sinnott was published in September 1978 as part of the Marvel Fireside Books series and is considered to be one of the first true "graphic novels."

=== Volume 2 ===
In 1982 Marvel published a Silver Surfer one-shot by Stan Lee, John Byrne, and Tom Palmer. The one-shot finds the Surfer being temporarily freed from Galactus's punishment, and attempts to rescue his missing love, Shalla-Bal. Although it is a one-shot, it serves a second volume within the title.

=== Volume 3 ===
The third volume series ran from 1987 to 1999 for 146 regular issues, as well as an issue number "−1", and nine annuals, making it the longest-running volume of Silver Surfer. This volume is sometimes referred to as the second Silver Surfer volume, but, according to indicia found inside the comics, the 1982 one-shot was designated "Volume 2" and Marvel therefore designated the second series, beginning in 1987, as "Volume 3."

=== Volume 4 ===
The fourth series was a 1988 two-issue out-of-continuity mini-series from Stan Lee and Moebius through Marvel's Epic Comics imprint, later collected under the title Silver Surfer: Parable.

=== Volume 5 ===
The fifth series started in 2004 and was written by Dan Chariton and Stacy Weiss, lasting 14 issues. Consisting of the Communion and Revelation story arcs, the fifth volume ran from September, 2003 to December, 2004.

=== Volume 6 ===
The sixth series was a five-part miniseries published in 2011, written by Greg Pak with art by Stephen Segovia. Given a brief run, the sixth volume started in April, and concluded in August in the year of 2011.

=== Volume 7 ===
The seventh series, written by Dan Slott and drawn by Mike Allred began in May 2014, lasting 15 issues.

=== Volume 8 ===
The eighth series, again written by Dan Slott and drawn by Mike Allred, ran from March 2016 to December 2017, lasting 14 issues.

== Writers ==
=== Volume 1 ===
Stan Lee wrote all 18 issues of The Silver Surfer, beginning in 1968. He later wrote many of the character's subsequent appearances, including the first Silver Surfer graphic novel in 1978 (published by Simon & Schuster).

=== Volume 2 ===
The Silver Surfer one-shot released in 1982 was plotted and penciled by John Byrne and scripted by Stan Lee.

=== Volume 3 ===
Writers for Silver Surfer vol. 3 include:

Issues	Writer
#1–20, 22–31	Steve Englehart
#21	Marshall Rogers
#32–33	Jim Valentino
#34–48, 50	Jim Starlin
#49, 51–102	Ron Marz
#103, 124–125, 146	Glenn Greenberg
#104–110	Mike Lackey
#111–123	George Pérez
#126–145, −1	J. M. DeMatteis

=== Volume 4 ===
Stan Lee returned to the character for both issues of volume 4 published through Marvel's Epic Comics imprint beginning in 1988.

=== Volume 5 ===
Dan Chariton and Stacy Weiss wrote all 14 issues of Silver Surfer volume 5, published from 2004 to 2005.

=== Volume 6 ===
Greg Pak wrote volume 6, consisting of a five-issue miniseries released in 2011.

=== Volumes 7 – 8 ===
Dan Slott wrote all 15 issues of volume 7 (May 2014 – December 2015) and all 14 issues of volume 8 (March 2016 – December 2017).

== Artists ==
=== Volume 1 ===
Volume 1 was pencilled by John Buscema and inked by Joe Sinnott, Sal Buscema, Dan Adkins and Chic Stone. Jack Kirby returned to pencil the final issue, #18, which was inked by Herb Trimpe.

=== Volume 2 ===
Volume 2 was a one-shot pencilled by John Byrne and inked by Tom Palmer.

=== Volume 3 ===
Marshall Rogers was the first to pencil Silver Surfer vol. 3 in 1987, followed by Ron Lim. Tom Grindberg took over from Lim and was later replaced by Scot Eaton. Ron Garney produced the artwork for several issues until issue #130, after which various artists illustrated the series. Guest artists before issue #130 include Joe Rubinstein, Joe Phillips, Bart Sears, and John Buscema.

=== Volume 7 ===
Michael Allred pencilled and inked volume 7 and Laura Allred was the colorist.

=== Volume 8 ===
Michael Allred pencilled and inked volume 8 and Laura Allred was the colorist.

== Bibliography ==
=== Original graphic novels ===
The Silver Surfer has featured in four original graphic novels:

- The Silver Surfer: The Ultimate Cosmic Experience, 114 pages, September 1978, Fireside Books, ISBN 978-0-671-22821-7
- Silver Surfer: Judgment Day, 64 pages, June 1988, ISBN 978-0-87135-427-3
- Silver Surfer: The Enslavers, 64 pages, May 1990, ISBN 978-0-87135-617-8
- Silver Surfer: Homecoming, 64 pages, November 1991, ISBN 978-0-87135-855-4

=== Additional series ===
The Silver Surfer has also headlined or co-headlined the following series:

- Silver Surfer vs. Dracula one-shot (1993, reprint issue)
- Silver Surfer / Warlock: Resurrection #1–4 (1994)
- Silver Surfer: Dangerous Artifacts one-shot (1996)
- Silver Surfer #1-2 (1997, Marvel Comics / Wizard Magazine)
- Silver Surfer: Loftier Than Mortals #1–2 (1999)
- Annihilation: Silver Surfer #1–4 (2006)
- Captain Universe / Silver Surfer one-shot (2006)
- Silver Surfer: Requiem #1–4 (2007)
- Stan Lee Meets the Silver Surfer one-shot (2007)
- Silver Surfer: In Thy Name #1–4 (2007)
- Silver Surfer: The Best Defense one-shot (2018)
- Silver Surfer: Black #1-5 (2019)
- Silver Surfer: Prodigal Sun one-shot (2019)
- Silver Surfer: Rebirth #1-5 (2022)
- Silver Surfer: Ghost Light #1-5 (2023)
- Silver Surfer Rebirth: Legacy #1-5 (2023)

=== Intercompany crossovers ===
Marvel has featured the Silver Surfer alongside characters from other companies in the following crossovers:

- Green Lantern / Silver Surfer: Unholy Alliances (DC Comics / Marvel Comics, 1995)
- Rune / Silver Surfer one-shot (Malibu Comics / Marvel Comics, 1995)
- Silver Surfer / Superman #1 (Marvel Comics / DC Comics, 1997)
- Silver Surfer / Weapon Zero one-shot (Marvel Comics / Top Cow Productions, 1997)
- Silver Surfer / Witchblade #1/2 (Marvel Comics / Top Cow Productions / Wizard Magazine, 1997)
- Weapon Zero / Silver Surfer one-shot (Top Cow Productions / Marvel Comics, 1997)

=== Collected editions ===
The character's various series have been collected into the following books:

- Son of Origins of Marvel Comics includes Silver Surfer #1, 249 pages, softcover, October 1975, Simon & Schuster, ISBN 978-0671221669
- Bring on the Bad Guys: Origins of the Marvel Comics Villains includes Silver Surfer #3, 253 pages, softcover, October 1976, Simon & Schuster, ISBN 978-0671223557
- Marvel's Greatest Superhero Battles includes Silver Surfer vol. 1 #4, 253 pages, softcover, November 1978, Simon & Schuster, ISBN 978-0671243913
- Essential Silver Surfer (b/w)
  - Volume 1 collects Silver Surfer vol. 1 #1–18 and Fantastic Four Annual #5, 528 pages, softcover, February 1998, ISBN 0-7851-2008-4
  - Volume 2 collects Silver Surfer vol. 2 #1, Silver Surfer vol. 3 #1–18, Silver Surfer Annual #1, and Marvel Fanfare #51, 600 pages, softcover, June 2007, ISBN 978-0-7851-2700-0
- Marvel Masterworks: The Silver Surfer
  - Volume 1 collects Silver Surfer vol. 1 #1–6 and Fantastic Four Annual #5, 272 pages, hardcover, June 2003, ISBN 978-0-7851-1187-0
    - Volume 1 collects Silver Surfer vol. 1 #1–6 and Fantastic Four Annual #5, 272 pages, softcover, January 2010, ISBN 978-0785142829
  - Volume 2 collects Silver Surfer #vol. 1 7–18, 280 pages, hardcover, August 2003, ISBN 978-0-7851-1177-1
    - Volume 2 collects Silver Surfer vol. 1 #7–18, 280 pages, softcover, January 2010, ISBN 978-0785145691
- Silver Surfer Omnibus collects Silver Surfer #1–18, Fantastic Four Annual #5, and Not Brand Echh #13, 576 pages, hardcover, June 2007, ISBN 0-7851-2753-4
- John Buscema's Silver Surfer Artist's Edition collects Silver Surfer vol. 1 #5-6 and 8, 144 pages, hardcover, January 2014, IDW Publishing, ISBN 978-1631401459
  - John Buscema's Silver Surfer Artisan Edition collects Silver Surfer vol. 1 #5-6 and 8, 144 pages, softcover, March 2022, IDW Publishing, ISBN 978-1684058853
- Silver Surfer Epic Collection
  - Volume 1: When Calls Galactus collects Fantastic Four vol. 1 #48–50, #55, #57–60, #72, #74–77; material from Tales to Astonish #92–93, Fantastic Four vol. 1 #56, #61, Fantastic Four Annual #5, 320 pages, softcover, December 2014, ISBN 978-0785190028
  - Volume 3: Freedom collects Silver Surfer vol. 2 #1, Silver Surfer vol. 3 #1–14, Super-Villain Classic #1; material from Epic Illustrated #1 and Marvel Fanfare #51, 488 pages, softcover, December 2015, ISBN 978-0785199038
  - Volume 4: Parable collects Silver Surfer vol. 3 #15-23, Silver Surfer Annual #1–2, Fantastic Four #325, Marvel Graphic Novel No. 38 - Silver Surfer: Judgment Day, Silver Surfer vol. 4 #1-2; material from Marvel Comics Presents #1, 488 pages, softcover, April 2022, ISBN 978-1302932329
  - Volume 5: The Return of Thanos collects Silver Surfer vol. 3 #24-38, Silver Surfer: The Enslavers, 480 pages, softcover, December 2022, ISBN 978-1302948290
  - Volume 6: Thanos Quest collects Silver Surfer vol. 3 #39-50, Silver Surfer Annual #3, Thanos Quest #1-2; material from Marvel Comics Presents #50, 480 pages, softcover, May 2018, ISBN 978-1-302-91186-7
  - Volume 7: The Infinity Gauntlet collects Silver Surfer vol. 3 #51-66, Silver Surfer Annual #4; material from Marvel Comics Presents #69, #93-97, 488 pages, softcover, May 2017, ISBN 978-1-302-90711-2
  - Volume 9: Resurrection collects Silver Surfer vol. 3 #76-85, Silver Surfer Annual (1988) #6, Silver Surfer/Warlock: Resurrection (1993) #1-4 and Secret Defenders (1993) #9-10. 456 pages, softcover. ISBN 978-1-302-92507-9
  - Volume 13: Inner Demons collects Silver Surfer vol. 3 #123-138, -1, and Silver Surfer Annual '97, 464 pages, softcover, June 2019, ISBN 978-1302918132
- The Definitive Silver Surfer collects Silver Surfer #1, Silver Surfer vol. 2 #1, Silver Surfer vol. 4 #1–2, Fantastic Four #48–50, Tales to Astonish #92–93 and The Tomb of Dracula #50, 260 pages, softcover, August 2007, Panini Comics, ISBN 1-905239-67-X
- Silver Surfer: Rebirth of Thanos includes Silver Surfer vol. 3 #34–38, 224 pages, softcover, April 2006, ISBN 0-7851-2046-7, hardcover, August 2010, ISBN 0-7851-4478-1
- Thor: Blood and Thunder includes Silver Surfer vol. 3 #86–88, 336 pages, softcover, July 2011, ISBN 978-0-7851-5094-7
- Silver Surfer: Parable collects Silver Surfer vol. 4 #1–2, 72 pages, hardcover, December 1988, ISBN 0-87135-491-8, softcover, 1998, ISBN 0-7851-0656-1
  - Silver Surfer: Parable collects Silver Surfer vol. 4 #1–2 and Silver Surfer: The Enslavers graphic novel, 168 pages, hardcover, May 2012, ISBN 978-0-7851-6209-4
- Silver Surfer: Communion collects Silver Surfer vol. 5 #1–6, 136 pages, softcover, June 2004, ISBN 0-7851-1319-3
- Silver Surfer: Requiem collects Silver Surfer: Requiem #1–4, 104 pages, hardcover, December 2007, ISBN 978-0-7851-2848-9, softcover, July 2008, ISBN 978-0-7851-1796-4
- Silver Surfer: In Thy Name collects Silver Surfer: In Thy Name #1–4, 96 pages, softcover, June 2008, ISBN 978-0-7851-2749-9
- Silver Surfer: Devolution collects Silver Surfer vol. 6 #1–5, 200 pages, softcover, September 2011, ISBN 978-0-7851-5665-9
- Silver Surfer by Dan Slott and Mike Allred:
  - Silver Surfer vol. 1: New Dawn collects Silver Surfer vol. 7 #1–5 and material from All-New Marvel Now! Point One, 128 pages, softcover, November 2014, ISBN 978-0785188780
  - Silver Surfer vol. 2: Worlds Apart collects Silver Surfer vol. 7 #6–10, 120 pages, softcover, June 2015, ISBN 978-0785188797
  - Silver Surfer vol. 3: Last Days collects Silver Surfer vol. 7 #11–15, 120 pages, softcover, November 2015, ISBN 978-0785197379
  - Silver Surfer vol. 4: Citizen of Earth collects Silver Surfer vol. 8 #1-6, 144 pages, softcover, October 2016, ISBN 978-0785199694
  - Silver Surfer vol. 5: A Power Greater Than Cosmic collects Silver Surfer vol. 8 #7-14, 176 pages, softcover, December 2017, ISBN 978-0785199700
  - Silver Surfer By Slott & Allred Omnibus collects Silver Surfer vol. 7 #1-15, Silver Surfer vol. 8 #1-14 and material from All-New Marvel Now! Point One, 688 pages, hardcover, December 2018, ISBN 978-1302913595
- Defenders: The Best Defense includes Silver Surfer: The Best Defense one-shot, 168 pages, softcover, March 2019, ISBN 978-1302916145
- Fantastic Four: Prodigal Sun includes Silver Surfer: Prodigal Sun one-shot, 112 pages, softcover, November 2019, ISBN 978-1302919801
- Silver Surfer: Black Treasury Edition collects Silver Surfer: Black #1-5, 120 pages, softcover, December 2019, ISBN 978-1302917432
  - Silver Surfer: Black collects Silver Surfer: Black #1-5, 120 pages, softcover, October 2020, ISBN 978-1302927844
- Silver Surfer: Rebirth collects Silver Surfer: Rebirth #1-5, 112 pages, softcover, August 2022, ISBN 978-1302932213

== Awards ==
- 1989:
  - Won "Best Finite Series" Eisner Award
  - Nominated for "Best Graphic Album" Eisner Award
- 2016
  - Won "Best Single Issue/Story--Silver Surfer #11: "Never After", by Dan Slott and Michael Allred (Marvel)-Eisner Award
