= Annihilation (comics) =

2006 Marvel Comics storyline

- Promotional cover art to Annihilation #1 by Gabriele Dell'Otto. Clockwise from top: Galactus, Moondragon, Nova, Annihilus, Ronan the Accuser, Silver Surfer, Drax the Destroyer
- Publisher: Marvel Comics
- Publication date: November 2005 – May 2007
- Genre: Military science fiction, superhero; Crossover
Title(s)
- Annihilation #1–6
- Annihilation: Heralds of Galactus #1–2
- Annihilation: Nova #1–4
- Annihilation: Prologue #1
- Annihilation: Ronan #1–4
- Annihilation: Silver Surfer #1–4
- Annihilation: Super-Skrull #1–4
- Drax the Destroyer #1–4
- Main characters: Annihilus; Galactus; Ravenous; Silver Surfer; Thanos; United Front: - Cammi; - Drax the Destroyer; - Firelord; - Gamora; - Guardians of the Galaxy; - Moondragon; - Nova; - Phyla-Vell; - Praxagora; - Quasar; - Red Shift; - Ronan the Accuser; - Stardust; - Star-Lord (Peter Quill); - Super-Skrull; - Talos

Creative team
- Writers: Dan Abnett (Nova); Simon Furman (Ronan); Keith Giffen (Prologue, Silver Surfer, Annihilation); Javier Grillo-Marxuach (Super Skrull); Andy Lanning (Nova)
- Artist: Gabriele Dell'Otto (all covers)
- Pencillers: Renato Arlem (Silver Surfer); Giuseppe Camuncoli (Heralds of Galactus); Andrea Di Vito (Annihilation, Heralds of Galactus); Scott Kolins (Prologue, Heralds of Galactus); Jorge Lucas (Ronan); Mike McKone (Heralds of Galactus); Gregory Titus (Super Skrull); Kev Walker (Nova)
- Editor: Andy Schmidt
- Volume 1: ISBN 0-7851-2901-4
- Volume 2: ISBN 0-7851-2512-4
- Volume 3: ISBN 0-7851-2513-2

"Annihilation" is a 2006 crossover storyline published by Marvel Comics, highlighting several outer space-related characters in the Marvel Universe. The central miniseries was written by Keith Giffen, with editor Andy Schmidt.

== Publication history ==
A 48-page one-shot issue, Annihilation: Prologue, was released on March 15, 2006. It was followed by four concurrent 4-issue miniseries, Silver Surfer (April 1, 2006), Super-Skrull (April 12, 2006), Nova (April 19, 2006), and Ronan the Accuser (April 26, 2006). Annihilation was published as a six issue miniseries beginning in August 2006. It was followed by two issues of Annihilation: Heralds of Galactus and a new volume of Nova.

While not published with the Annihilation banner, Drax the Destroyer: Earthfall #1–4 (Sept 2005) and Thanos #7–12 (2004) were preludes to the event.

== Plot ==
=== Thanos ===
Thanos visits the intergalactic prison, the Kyln. With the help of Star-Lord, he subdues the female mortal form of the Beyonder called the Maker. Thanos also befriends Skreet, a chaos mite, and enslaves a former herald of Galactus, the Fallen One.

=== Drax the Destroyer: Earthfall ===
Drax the Destroyer is on a prison transport ship that crashes in Alaska. He befriends a teenage girl named Cammi and protects the locals from the Blood Brothers, Lunatik, and Paibok. During the battle, Drax gains a new body. A second prison ship arrives and arrests Drax and Cammi.

=== Annihilation: Prologue ===
The Annihilation Wave, a large armada of warships under the control of Annihilus, enters this universe through "The Crunch", the area of space where the Negative Zone and this Universe meet. The Kyln and several neighboring star systems are quickly annexed. The Nova Corps, an intergalactic police force, immediately calls in all Nova Centurions for a top level briefing in Xandar, the Nova Corps home world. During the briefing, The Annihilation Wave invades and successfully destroys the planet, including all Nova Corp members save for Richard Rider, the lone human Nova Corps member. Having also been delivered to Xandar prior to the attack, Drax and Cammi also survive the onslaught of the Annihilation Wave.

Elsewhere in the galaxy, Ronan the Accuser, Supreme Accuser of the Kree Empire, is arrested for treason. The Super-Skrull learns that the Annihilation Wave is moving toward the Skrull Empire, while the Silver Surfer decides to investigate.

=== Annihilation: Nova ===
After the fall of Xandar, Richard Rider, the last surviving known Nova Corps member in the universe, allows the Xandarian Worldmind, the artificial intelligence compiled of the eons of knowledge and experiences of the entire Xandarian race and the repository for the Nova Force—the cosmic power utilized by all Nova Corps members—to download itself in its entirety into his mind and body in order to prevent itself from being lost to the universe.

With the entire knowledge and experiences of the Xandarian culture, as well as the full power of the Nova Force at his disposal, Richard Rider becomes Nova Prime. To compensate for this upgrade, Worldmind creates a new uniform designed to help regulate the immense power of the Nova Force, as well as also augment Nova Prime's mental and emotional capacities with its own to in order to prevent Richard Rider from going insane.

Nova Prime, along with Drax and Cammi, leaves what remains of Xandar and speeds to the next star system. Once there, they find Quasar, wielder of the Quantum Bands, assisting in the exodus of one of its star system planets. The Annihilation Wave arrives and Nova Prime and Quasar attack in order to give the exodus enough time to succeed. In the ensuing battle, Quasar is consumed by Annihilus, who now wields the Quantum Bands.

=== Annihilation: Silver Surfer ===
Annihilus dispatches the Seekers, led by Ravenous, to capture beings imbued with the Power Cosmic. While avoiding them, the Silver Surfer joins forces with other former heralds of Galactus; Firelord and Air-Walker. Air-Walker is killed, and the seekers capture Terrax and Morg in separate engagements. To protect Galactus from the Seekers, Surfer replaces Stardust as his herald. Stardust, Firelord, and Red Shift join the United Front against the Annihilation Wave.

Galactus reveals that the Annihilation Wave's destruction of the Kyln may have freed two Proemial Gods, Tenebrous and Aegis, whom he imprisoned when "the universe was young." Thanos, guided by Skreet and Mistress Death, allies with Annihilus. Thanos also pursues an alliance with Tenebrous and Aegis. Before they agree to it, they kill the Fallen One.

=== Annihilation: Super Skrull ===
Once the Annihilation Wave reaches the Skrull empire, it begins using a weapon known as the Harvester of Sorrows, a massive ship which renders entire planets into fuel for the armada. Learning that the planet his son lives on is in its path, Kl'rt the Super-Skrull and a young Skrull engineer, R'Kin, travel to the Negative Zone to find a way to stop the Harvester. Kl'rt locates Hawal, the warden of a prison planet and designer of the Harvester. Using torture, Kl'rt forces Hawal to design a virus that can destroy the Harvester. He also unites the planet's prisoners into an army.

When Kl'rt brings his army back to the Skrull empire to attack the Harvester, R'Kin betrays them. Kl'rt is able to escape and destroy the Harvester, but not before his son is consumed by it. Kl'rt appears to be killed in the process.

=== Annihilation: Ronan ===
On the run from Kree authorities since his trial, Ronan the Accuser seeks Tana Nile, a witness who falsely accused him of treason. Ronan lands on Godthab Omega, where he finds an encampment of exiled Kree, including his old friend Korath, and learns that Tana Nile has joined the Graces, a group of cosmically powered women led by Gamora. After defeating Nebula and Stellaris, Ronan ends up in battle against Gamora herself, who now possesses the power cosmic. However, their conflict, as well as several others, is in truth caused by the manipulation of Glorian, who is using the energy from their battles to reshape the world.

Just as Glorian's plan approaches completion, the Annihilation Wave attacks Godthab Omega. Ronan, Korath, Gamora, and Glorian all battle Annihilus's forces. Tana Nile is killed, preventing Ronan from proving his innocence. Undeterred, Ronan resolves to return to the Kree, violating his exile to warn them of the coming danger.

=== Annihilation ===
205 days after Annihilation Day, Richard Rider has formed an army, the United Front, to oppose the Annihilation Wave. His land-based army includes Drax, Gamora, Ronan the Accuser and Peter Quill, while his outer space forces consist primarily of Firelord, Red Shift and Stardust. They capture one of Annihilus' queens, who reveals that Thanos, Tenebrous and Aegis had attacked and incapacitated Galactus and the Silver Surfer. Believing the Power Cosmic to be within his grasp, Annihilus orders his troops to kill the remaining former Heralds of Galactus.

Thanos kidnaps Moondragon and tells Drax via Phyla-Vell that she will be killed if Drax pursues him. Ravenous leads an attack on the United Front and he has many of Nova's former allies in his thrall, including Terrax. During the conflict, a huge energy spike restores the deceased Super-Skrull Kl'rt to his full power. Ravenous' troops retreat as Annihilus' ship arrives. With Thanos' aid, Annihilus has turned an imprisoned Galactus into a weapon. The United Front is broken and defeated. In the aftermath of the battle, Nova sends out a warning to the heroes of Earth about the approaching wave. Drax stays behind to hunt and kill Thanos.

Thanos had allied himself with Annihilus out of curiosity. When he learns Annihilus' plan is to extinguish all life in the universe, Thanos plans to betray him by releasing Galactus. Just before he can do so, Drax appears and kills him. Drax and Moondragon then release the Silver Surfer, who in turn releases Galactus.

At the same time, Ronan the Accuser and a small band of allies (including Ronan's sworn enemy, the Super-Skrull) arrive on the homeworld of ruling Kree House Fiyero. Ronan learns that House Fiyero had allied themselves with Ravenous and Annihilus. Ronan kills the members of Fiyero and is called by the populace to be the new emperor.

Galactus proceeds to unleash a massive, omnidirectional blast that later becomes known as the "Galactus event." Silver Surfer is sent ahead of the blast by Galactus to herald the imminent destruction, as the unleashed "Galactus obliteration perimeter" wipes out the majority of the Annihilation Wave, more than three star systems and even vaporizes a Watcher.

Nova, Peter Quill and Phyla-Vell have teleported close to Annihilus' flagship and are preparing to make the last jump when Galactus' energy wave arrives. Annihilus, finding that he has been betrayed by Thanos and undone by Galactus, uses Quasar's quantum bands to protect himself from the energy blast. Nova battles Annihilus, but is unable to win until Phyla manages to steal the Quantum bands from Annihilus. Nova kills the weakened villain.

A treaty between the remains of the Annihilation Wave and the Kree was signed, ceding certain Kree territories to Ravenous. This ends the overt hostilities, but both sides are unhappy.

=== Annihilation: Heralds of Galactus ===
After being captured, enslaved and made a pawn of Annihilus, Terrax has broken free only to crash-land on a planet ruled by the Space Parasite. He decides to destroy this murderous entity as a way to regain his honor.

Stardust returns from death and re-devotes himself to Galactus. As proof of his commitment, Stardust feeds the last of his race to the malnourished Galactus.

Galactus sends the Silver Surfer to track Tenebrous and Aegis. Surfer ends up destroying them with the energy of the Crunch.

Firelord tracks down many of the Centurians—Annihilus's elite force that murdered his homeworld and many other worlds. He kills some, but others plead for mercy, saying they were tricked. Firelord allows them to live, but only if they behave from that moment on.

== Sequels and spin-offs ==
After the Annihilation event concluded, Marvel announced a new Nova ongoing series, written by Dan Abnett and Andy Lanning, as well as a second crossover event in a similar format, Annihilation: Conquest, by the same authors. The second volume of Guardians of the Galaxy, which began in 2008, features several of the characters in Annihilation. In November and December 2019, Marvel released Annihilation: Scourge, a six issue storyline where Annihilus works with Nova, the Fantastic Four, Beta Ray Bill, and the Silver Surfer to stop a different invading army. In 2021, Marvel released Last Annihilation, a crossover between the Guardians of the Galaxy and SWORD fighting against Dormammu, who had fused himself to the remains of Ego, the Living Planet with his latest attempt to obliterate countless worlds and assimilate them into his native Dark Dimension.

== Other versions ==
=== What If? ===
In a special What If by David Hine and Mico Suayan, the Annihilation Wave reaches Earth in the climactic battle of the Civil War between Iron Man's pro-Superhuman Registration Act side and Captain America's anti-Superhuman Registration Act side. Nova is outraged; the heroes are fighting over secret identities when such a massive threat is coming, revealing that in this world, Drax was unable to revive Galactus and thus the Wave continued its march, taking much of the Kree Empire along with Ronan and the Super-Skrull. The Wave hits Earth in a massive strike on multiple cities, the heroes and villains uniting to fight it off while sustaining massive casualties. With more of Annihilus' forces coming, this reality's Watcher tells the heroes that the Terminus device can be used to open a black hole to suck the fleet away. With the help of the Inhumans, they trick Annihilus into sending his forces toward the moon. Nova intends to stay and set the device off and Captain America and Iron Man volunteer to help him fight off the Wave to buy Earth time. The three sacrifice themselves to set off the device, sucking the Wave into the black hole and leaving Earth ravaged but still alive.

== In other media ==
The Annihilation storyline was loosely adapted for the plot of the video game Marvel Cosmic Invasion (2025).

== Reviews ==
- Casus Belli (v4, Issue 15 - Jun/Jul 2015)

== Collected editions ==
| Title | Material collected | Published date | ISBN |
|---|---|---|---|
| Annihilation Classic | Bug #1, Tales to Astonish #13, Nova #1, Quasar #1, Rocket Raccoon #1-4, Marvel Spotlight #6, Logan's Run #6, Marvel Premiere #1 | October 2008 | 978-0785133889 |
| Guardians of the Galaxy: Road to Annihilation Vol. 1 | Warlock #1-4, Captain Marvel #4-6, 15–16, Infinity Abyss #1-6, She-Hulk #7-8 | January 2017 | 978-1302904418 |
| Guardians of the Galaxy: Road to Annihilation Vol. 2 | Sensational She-Hulk #44-46, Thanos #7-12, Marvel Monsters: Monsters on the Prowl, Nick Fury's Howling Commandos #1-6 | April 2017 | 978-1302904425 |
| Annihilation Book 1 | Drax the Destroyer #1-4, Annihilation Prologue, Annihilation: Nova #1-4 | February 2007 | 978-0785129011 |
| Annihilation Book 2 | Annihilation: Silver Surfer #1-4, Annihilation: Super-Skrull #1-4, Annihilation: Ronan #1-4 | May 2007 | 978-0785125129 |
| Annihilation Book 3 | Annihilation #1-6, Annihilation: Heralds of Galactus #1-2, Annihilation: The Nova Corps Files | July 2007 | 978-0785125136 |
| Annihilation: The Complete Collection Vol. 1 | Drax the Destroyer #1-4, Annihilation Prologue, Annihilation: Nova #1-4, Annihilation: Silver Surfer #1-4, Annihilation: Super-Skrull #1-4 | April 2018 | 978-1302912864 |
| Annihilation: The Complete Collection Vol. 2 | Annihilation: Ronan #1-4, Annihilation #1-6, Annihilation: Heralds of Galactus #1-2, Annihilation: The Nova Corps Files | May 2018 | 978-1302912871 |
| Annihilation Omnibus | Drax the Destroyer #1-4, Annihilation Prologue, Annihilation: Nova #1-4, Annihilation: Silver Surfer #1-4, Annihilation: Super-Skrull #1-4, Annihilation: Ronan #1-4, Annihilation #1-6, Annihilation: Heralds of Galactus #1-2, Annihilation: The Nova Corps Files | May 2022 | 978-1302934071 |
