= Shalla-Bal =

Marvel Comics character

Publication information
- Publisher: Marvel Comics
- First appearance: Silver Surfer #1 (August 1968)
- Created by: Stan Lee; John Buscema

In-story information
- Species: Zenn-Lavian
- Notable aliases: Helena

Shalla-Bal is a character appearing in American comic books published by Marvel Comics, the immortal Empress of Zenn-La and the lover of Norrin Radd, the Silver Surfer. When Radd becomes the Herald of Galactus in exchange for his planet being spared, he is separated from Shalla-Bal.

Shalla-Bal as the Silver Surfer appeared in the Marvel Cinematic Universe (MCU) film The Fantastic Four: First Steps (2025), played by Julia Garner.

== Publication history ==
The character first appeared in Silver Surfer #1 (August 1968), created by writer Stan Lee and artist John Buscema.

In a 1975 storyline in Fantastic Four, Shalla-Bal was trapped in the form of a Latverian peasant girl named Helena by Mephisto, and married Doctor Doom, until in a 1982 Silver Surfer one-shot, the Surfer discovers this deception and frees her from Mephisto's trap.

In the 2016 Silver Surfer series, Shalla-Bal begins a campaign to spread the culture of Zenn-La across the universe as the Keeper of the Great Truth. In the conclusion of the series, Silver Surfer is forced to erase their culture from existence so that even they could not remember it.

== Fictional character biography ==
Shalla-Bal is the empress of the utopian planet Zenn-La and the lover of Norrin Radd. When the planet-eating Galactus comes to Zenn-La, Radd volunteers to become his herald in exchange for sparing Zenn-La. Radd is given the Power Cosmic and becomes the Silver Surfer, thus separating him from Shalla-Bal.

Eventually, the Silver Surfer rebels against Galactus, who traps him on Earth as punishment by putting up an energy barrier that the Silver Surfer cannot get through. The demon Mephisto, who desires to defeat the Surfer and steal his soul, senses the anguish of this separation within him, and uses Shalla-Bal as a pawn in his conflict with the Surfer. As part of a conspiracy, Mephisto replaces the consciousness of Shalla-Bal so that she believes herself to be a regular citizen of Latveria named Helena, and Doctor Doom organizes a false marriage celebration with her to make the Surfer fight the Fantastic Four.

Meanwhile, Galactus consumes the life energies and ecosphere of Zenn-La because of Silver Surfer's betrayal, but spares the lives of its people by warning them of his coming beforehand, allowing them to return to the planet afterwards. When Mister Fantastic frees the Surfer from his imprisonment, he returns to Zenn-La to find it in this state and learns that Shalla-Bal was abducted by Mephisto. The Surfer understands the conspiracy and returns to Latveria to find Shalla-Bal, imprisoning himself once again on Earth. The Surfer bestows a portion of his Power Cosmic to Shalla-Bal, allowing her to restore life on Zenn-La.

== Powers and abilities ==
As a member of the race of aliens known as Zenn-Lavians, Shalla-Bal has an extraordinarily long-life span and remained physically young and attractive despite being centuries old. As the Silver Surfer, she gained abilities such as flight, being able to move through space at light-speed without exhaustion, being able to alter the molecules of her body to phase through solid matter, immortality, imperviousness to physical harm, and energy projection.

Shalla-Bal was once able to restore life to Zenn-La's ecosphere due to a fragment of the Silver Surfer's power cosmic that he placed within her. Apparently, she can still cause plant life to grow wherever she walks.

== Other versions ==
=== Earth X ===
An alternate universe version of Shalla-Bal appears in Earth X. This version was transformed into the Silver Surfer by Franklin Richards / Galactus before she is later killed in battle against the Celestials.

=== What If ===
Multiple alternate universe versions of Shalla-Bal appear in What If:

- In "What If Norrin Radd Had Not Volunteered to Become the Silver Surfer", Shalla-Bal abandons her people and escapes with Radd on a shuttle as Zenn-La is consumed by Galactus.
- In "What If Galactus Had Turned the Silver Surfer Back Into Norrin Radd", Shalla-Bal was transformed into Starglow by Galactus after he returned to Zenn-La and stripped Silver Surfer of his powers for aiding the Fantastic Four. Galactus takes Shalla-Bal as his herald, removing her emotions and memories of Radd to ensure her loyalty.
- In "What If Silver Surfer Possessed the Infinity Gauntlet", the Silver Surfer intervenes to prevent Thanos from using the Infinity Gauntlet and entrusts it to Shalla-Bal. Unaware of its powers, she tries to wield it and is instantly corrupted, resulting in the Surfer engaging her in battle. The Gauntlet is ultimately destroyed, and both Shalla-Bal and the Surfer are seemingly killed; in truth, the pair fake their deaths to live together in peace.

== In other media ==
- Shalla-Bal appears in Silver Surfer, voiced by Camilla Scott.
- Shalla-Bal / Silver Surfer appears in The Fantastic Four: First Steps, portrayed by Julia Garner. This version was originally a scientist before becoming the Silver Surfer to ensure her homeworld's survival.

== In popular culture ==
- Guitarist Joe Satriani recorded an instrumental rock song named "Back to Shalla-Bal" on his 1989 album Flying in a Blue Dream.
- Australian rock group Swoop recorded a song named "Shalla Bal (Ballad(e) of the Silver Surfer)" on their 1995 album The Woxo Principle.
