= Human Torch =

Marvel Comics character

- Variant cover of Fantastic Four #645 (April 2015). Art by Michael Komarck.

Publication information
- Publisher: Marvel Comics
- First appearance: Fantastic Four #1 (November. 1961)
- Created by: Stan Lee (writer); Jack Kirby (artist) (based upon the original character by Carl Burgos)

In-story information
- Alter ego: Jonathan Lowell Spencer "Johnny" Storm
- Species: Human mutate
- Team affiliations: Fantastic Four; Avengers; Future Foundation; Fantastic Force; Herald of Galactus; Fantastic Four Incorporated; Avengers Unity Division
- Notable aliases: Invisible Man
- Abilities: Pyrokinesis; Fiery form that enables flight; Heat energy absorption

The Human Torch (Jonathan Lowell Spencer "Johnny" Storm) is a superhero appearing in American comic books published by Marvel Comics. The character is a founding member of the Fantastic Four. He is writer Stan Lee's and artist Jack Kirby's reinvention of a similar, previous character, the android Human Torch of the same name and powers who was created in 1939 by writer-artist Carl Burgos for Marvel Comics' predecessor company, Timely Comics.

Like the rest of the Fantastic Four, Johnny gained his powers on a spacecraft bombarded by cosmic rays. He can engulf his entire body in flames, fly, absorb fire harmlessly into his own body, and control any nearby fire by sheer force of will. "Flame on!", which the Torch customarily shouts when activating his full-body flame effect, has become his catchphrase. The youngest of the group, he is brash and impetuous in comparison to his reticent, overprotective and compassionate older sister, Susan Storm, his sensible brother-in-law, Reed Richards, and the grumbling Ben Grimm. In the early 1960s, he starred in a series of solo adventures, published in Strange Tales. The Human Torch is also a friend and frequent ally of the superhero Spider-Man, who is approximately the same age.

In film, the Human Torch has been portrayed by Jay Underwood in the unreleased 1994 film The Fantastic Four; Chris Evans in the 2005 film Fantastic Four, its 2007 sequel Fantastic Four: Rise of the Silver Surfer, Robot Chicken in 2008, and the Marvel Cinematic Universe (MCU) film Deadpool & Wolverine (2024); Michael B. Jordan in the 2015 film Fantastic Four; and Joseph Quinn in the MCU film The Fantastic Four: First Steps (2025); Quinn will reprise the role in Avengers: Doomsday (2026) and Avengers: Secret Wars (2027).

== Publication history ==
Created by writer Stan Lee and artist Jack Kirby, Johnny Storm is a renovation of Carl Burgos's original character, the android Human Torch, created for Timely Comics in 1939. Storm first appeared in The Fantastic Four #1 (cover-dated Nov. 1961), establishing him as a member of the titular superhero team. In his plot summary for this first issue, Lee passed on to Kirby that the recently formed Comics Code Authority had told him that the Human Torch was only permitted to burn objects, never people. Over the course of the series, Johnny being the little brother of teammate Susan Storm a.k.a. the Invisible Girl was one of several sources of tension within the group.

Additionally, he starred in a solo feature in Strange Tales #101-134 (Oct. 1962 – July 1965). An eight-issue series, The Human Torch (Sept. 1974 – Nov. 1975), reprinted stories from that solo feature, along with stories featuring the original android Human Torch. Later years also saw a 12-issue series, Human Torch (June 2003 - June 2004) by writer Karl Kesel and penciler Skottie Young, and the five-issue team-up miniseries Spider-Man / Human Torch (March–July 2005) by writer Dan Slott and penciler Ty Templeton.

The Human Torch was the permanent co-star of Marvel Team-Up, but was dropped after three issues because the creators found this format too restrictive. He co-starred in two one-shot comics, Spider-Man & the Human Torch in... Bahia De Los Muertos! #1 (May 2009), by writer Tom Beland and artist Juan Doe, and Incredible Hulk & the Human Torch: From the Marvel Vault #1, a previously unpublished story from 1984, intended for Marvel Team-Up by plotter Jack C. Harris, scriptwriter and artist Kesel, and breakdown artist Steve Ditko.

== Fictional character biography ==
=== Early life ===
Growing up in Glenville, New York, a fictional Long Island suburban town, Johnny Storm lost his mother due to a car accident from which his father, surgeon Franklin Storm, escaped unharmed. Franklin Storm spiraled into alcoholism and financial ruin, and was imprisoned after killing a loan shark in self-defense. Johnny Storm was then raised by his older sister, Sue Storm.

A panel from The Fantastic Four #1 (Nov. 1961) (left) shows the Human Torch as drawn in his first adventure. The depiction was altered when the story was reprinted in Fantastic Four Annual #1 (1963) (right), to conform to how the Human Torch was depicted from The Fantastic Four #3 onward. Original pencil art by Jack Kirby and unconfirmed inker. Alterations by Sol Brodsky.

At 16, Storm joined his sister and her fiancé, Reed Richards, in a space flight in which cosmic radiation transformed those three and spacecraft pilot Ben Grimm into superpowered beings who would become the celebrated superhero team the Fantastic Four. Storm, with the ability to become a flaming human with the power of flight and the ability to project fire, dubs himself the Human Torch, in tribute to the World War II-era hero known as the Human Torch. In The Fantastic Four #4, it is Storm who discovers an amnesiac hobo whom he helps regain his memory as the antihero Namor the Sub-Mariner, one of the three most popular heroes of Marvel Comics' 1940s forerunner, Timely Comics, returning him to modern continuity.

Though a member of a world-famous team, Johnny still lived primarily in Glenville and attended Glenville High School. Here he thought he maintained a secret identity, although his fellow townsfolk were well aware of his being a member of the Fantastic Four and simply humored him. This series introduced what would become the recurring Fantastic Four foes the Wizard and Paste-Pot Pete, later known as the Trapster. In Storm's home life, Mike Snow, a member of the high-school wrestling squad, bullied Storm until an accidental flare-up of the Torch's powers scarred Snow's face. Storm dated fellow student Dorrie Evans, although she eventually grew tired of his constant disappearances and broke off their relationship.

=== College ===
After graduating high school, Storm enrolled at New York City's Metro College. There he befriended his roommate Wyatt Wingfoot. He also met the original Human Torch of the 1930s and 1940s. Around this time, Storm met and fell in love with Crystal, a member of the superpowered race the Inhumans. After their relationship ended, Crystal returned to her native city of Attilan and eventually married the superhero Quicksilver. Storm, crushed, attempted to move on, finding that his high-school girlfriend, Dorrie Evans, had married and had two children. Storm dropped out of college but remained friends with Wingfoot, who often participated in the Fantastic Four's adventures.

Storm eventually began a romance with who he thought was Alicia Masters but was eventually revealed to be an alien from the shapeshifting Skrull race, Lyja, posing as Masters. In the interim, they married. Storm later discovers "Alicia's" true identity, and that Lyja is pregnant with his child. He then witnessed Lyja's apparent death and rescued the real Alicia from the Skrulls.

Storm briefly joined his nephew Franklin Richards' Fantastic Force team, where he battled his otherdimensional counterpart, Vangaard (formerly Gaard). Lyja posed as student Laura Green and dated Storm to stay close to him; Storm recognized her when they kissed, though he did not reveal this to her until later.

=== Outside career and anti-registration movement ===
Seeking an acting career, Storm was cast as the Old West hero the Rawhide Kid, but producers reconsidered and gave the role to Lon Zelig (actually the alien Super-Skrull). After working mostly in some television shows, Storm also spent some time as a firefighter at the behest of his former classmate, Mike Snow, but when Snow moved away after his wife turned out to be a psychopathic arsonist and seemingly died, Storm left the job. He later returned to the profession during a period when the Fantastic Four was short on cash. Frustrated with her brother's directionless life and near-disastrous pranksterism, his sister compelled him to become chief financial officer for the Fantastic Four, Inc. Infighting and betrayal resulted in a near-catastrophe, ending Storm's position.

After a major battle with the supervillain and dictator Doctor Doom, Fantastic Four leader Reed Richards attempted to claim Doom's Latveria for the Fantastic Four, an act that alienated the United States government and his own team. This led to team-member Ben Grimm's apparent death and the Fantastic Four's subsequent dispersal. Storm took to fixing cars for a living. Grimm later was revealed to be alive. Over the Internet, Storm meets a young woman, Cole, whom he learns is the daughter of one of the Fantastic Four's oldest enemies, the Wizard; after a confrontation with that supervillain, who escaped with Cole, Storm remained hopeful of meeting her again. For a time, Storm became the Herald of the powerful cosmic being Galactus, becoming the Invisible Boy after switching powers with his sister and teammate, Susan Richards, the Invisible Woman.

During the 2006–2007 "Civil War" company-wide crossover, in which the superpowered community is split over the Superhuman Registration Act, which required them to register with, and become agents of, the US government, Storm and his sister allied with the underground rebels, the Secret Avengers. Shortly afterward, during the "Secret Invasion" company-wide crossover, the shape-shifting extraterrestrial Skrulls intensified their clandestine infiltration of Earth. Storm was briefly reunited with his former Skrull girlfriend, Lyja. Though part of the invading force, she finds she still has some feelings for him, and does not carry out her mission of sabotage. She returns to her people, unsure of herself and of any future relationship.

=== Death and return ===
In the conclusion of the 2011 "Three" storyline, in Fantastic Four #587 (March 2011), the Human Torch appears to die fighting a horde of aliens from the Negative Zone. The series ended with the following issue, #588, and relaunched in March 2011 as simply FF. Spider-Man, one of Storm's friends, took his place on the team, as requested in the Torch's will.

It is later revealed that the Human Torch was revived by a species of insect-like creatures that were implanted in his body by Annihilus in an attempt to force Storm to help open the Negative Zone portal. Storm eventually escapes and Richards determines Storm was on the other side of the portal for two years from his perspective.

The Human Torch becomes an ambassador within Inhuman society and joins Steve Rogers's Avengers Unity Squad and helps Rogue in incinerating the telepathic portions of Professor Xavier's brains, thus unknowingly preventing Hydra from using it for their secret empire. He becomes a multi-billionaire when he inherits Reed Richards' and Sue Storm's wealth and uses the money for rebuilding the Avengers Mansion and philanthropy. He is seemingly annihilated when he grabs a cosmic object called Pyramoids during the fight between the Lethal Legion and the Black Order in Peru, but is restored after Living Lightning wins a high stakes poker game versus Grandmaster.

To help the Thing cope with Mister Fantastic and the Invisible Woman's disappearance, the Human Torch takes him on a journey through the Multiverse using the Multisect in order to find them. They have not been able to find Mister Fantastic and the Invisible Woman as they return to Earth-616 empty-handed. The Human Torch and the Thing were reunited with Mister Fantastic and the Invisible Woman to help alongside other superheroes who were part of the Fantastic Four (including surprisingly X-Men's Iceman) fight the Griever at the End of All Things after Mister Fantastic persuaded the Griever to let him summon the Thing and the Human Torch. As the Thing and his teammates finally return to 616, while the Future Foundation stays behind to keep learning multiverse, the Thing reveals to them that he proposed to Alicia and they are about to get married soon. Although the Baxter Building is now owned by a new superhero team Fantastix, the Thing allows his teammates to use his hometown Yancy Street as their current operation base. He later becomes engaged to an Unparalleled superhero named Sky from the planet Spyre, who then travels back to Earth with him and joins the Fantastic Four. Their relationship is brief however, when Johnny cheats on her with Victorious, a hero from Latveria and fiancé of Doctor Doom.

During a conflict at Doom's wedding, where his infidelity with Victorious is revealed, Johnny Storm becomes permanently stuck in his Human Torch form and his powers are boosted to the point where it is unsafe for him to be around others.

During the Reckoning War storyline, Johnny unites various cosmic factions and leads their armies to defend the Watchers. Once the multiverse is saved, Johnny opts to return to Spyre with Sky so that her people can cure him and return him to normal.

== Powers and abilities ==
Johnny Storm gained a number of superhuman powers as a result of the mutagenic effects of the cosmic radiation he was exposed to, all of which are related to fire. His primary ability is to envelop his body in fiery plasma without harm to himself, in which form he is able to fly by providing thrust behind himself with his own flame, and to generate powerful streams and balls of flame. He can also manipulate his flame in such a way as to shape it into rings and other forms, such as a fiery duplicate of himself that he can remotely control. Even when not engulfed in flame himself, Storm has the ability to control any fire within his immediate range of vision, causing it to increase or decrease in intensity or to move in a pattern directed by his thoughts. Additionally, he is able to absorb fire/plasma into his body with no detrimental effects.

The plasma field immediately surrounding his body is hot enough to vaporize projectiles that approach him, including bullets. He does not generally extend this flame-aura beyond a few inches from his skin, so as not to ignite nearby objects. Storm refers to his maximum flame output as his "nova flame", which he can release omnidirectionally. Flame of any temperature lower than this cannot burn or harm the Torch. This "nova" effect can occur spontaneously when he absorbs an excessive amount of heat, although he can momentarily suppress the release when necessary, with considerable effort.

Storm has demonstrated enough control with fire that he can safely shave another's hair, or hold a person while in his flame form without his passenger feeling discomforting heat. His knowledge extends to general information about fire as well, supported by regular visits to fire-safety lectures at various firehouses in New York. In one instance when poisoned, Storm superheated his blood to burn the toxin out.

Storm's ability to ignite himself is limited by the quantity of oxygen in his environment, and his personal flame has been extinguished by sufficient quantities of water, flame retardant foam, and vacuum environments. He can reignite instantly once oxygen is returned, with no ill effects. In early stories he could only remain aflame for up to five minutes at a time, after which he would need five minutes to recharge before igniting himself again.

Storm was depicted as transmuting his body itself into living flame in the first two issues of The Fantastic Four. In all subsequent appearances, his power consists in the generation of a flaming aura.

== Romance ==
The Human Torch has been involved in several romantic relationships throughout the years, including, but not limited to, the Inhuman Crystal, member-in-training and future Galactus herald Frankie Raye, the Skrull agent Lyja disguised as Alicia Masters, the Atlantean Namorita, Inhuman Medusa, and X-Men member Rogue.

Crystal dissolved her relationship with him due to the adverse effects of pollution within population centers of Homo sapiens. Frankie Raye ended her relationship with him when she accepted Galactus' offer to become his newest herald.

Lyja, while in the disguise of the Thing's former girlfriend Alicia Masters, carried on a long-term relationship including marriage with the Torch, until it was revealed that her true nature was as a Skrull double agent. Although the two attempted reconciliation after it was learned that their "child" was actually an implanted weapon to be used against the Fantastic Four, they ultimately parted on less than favorable terms.

Torch's brief relationship with Namorita lasted until he pursued a career in Hollywood. It is suggested that he had a short relationship with his Uncanny Avengers/Unity Squad leader Rogue, following which he had a rebound relationship with Medusa (Crystal's sister). At first it seemed as if he and Rogue resumed their relationship, which was considered as an open secret, however this relationship came to an end after his apparent death and when Rogue rekindled her relationship with Gambit. He has also had relationships with civilian women.

== Other versions ==
Several alternate universe versions of the Human Torch have appeared throughout the character's publication history, primarily in series set in alternate universes.

=== Counter-Earth ===
On Counter-Earth, Johnny Storm died from radiation poisoning years after Man-Beast sabotaged the flight that would have given the Fantastic Four their powers.

=== Earth-A ===
On Earth-A, Johnny initially did not gain powers and served in the Vietnam War, where he is believed to have been killed. However, Johnny is found and saved by Arkon, who gives him superpowers and the new identity of Gaard.

=== Heroes Reborn ===
In the Heroes Reborn universe, Johnny is an owner of a popular casino.

=== House of M ===
In the House of M universe, Johnny has no innate powers and derives his pyrokinesis from powered armor.

=== Marvel 1602 ===
In the Marvel 1602 universe, Jon Storm is originally from London and was forced to leave following a duel.

=== Marvel Mangaverse ===
In the Marvel Mangaverse, two characters based on Human Torch appear. The first is a member of the Megascale Metatalent Response Team Fantastic Four on Earth-2301a. In volume two of Mangaverse, which takes place on Earth-2301b, Johnny is replaced with a gender-flipped version of the character named Jonatha, who is the half-sister of Sioux Storm and seeks revenge for the murder of the other Fantastic 4 members.

=== Ultimate Marvel ===
In the Ultimate Marvel universe, Johnny gained superpowers after being caught in Reed Richards' test of the N-Zone teleportation device. His fire is created by nuclear fusion processes within his body, which generate plasma that is ejected from his body and ignites on contact with air.

=== Ultimate Universe ===
In the Ultimate Universe imprint, Johnny Storm was killed after the Ultimate Marvel version of Reed Richards (who has since become the Maker) sabotaged the rocket flight that would have given the Fantastic Four their powers.

=== What If ===
In What If? #11 (March 1990), three alternate universe versions of Johnny Storm appear, showing how the heroes' lives would have changed if all four had gained the same powers as the individual members of the original Fantastic Four.

== In other media ==
=== Television ===
- The Human Torch appears in Fantastic Four (1967), voiced by Jack Flounders.
- The Human Torch was intended to appear in The New Fantastic Four, but was dropped due to rights issues and replaced with series-original character H.E.R.B.I.E. Similarly, the Human Torch was meant to appear in Spider-Man and His Amazing Friends before Firestar was created in his place.
- The Human Torch appears in Fantastic Four (1994), voiced by Brian Austin Green in the first season and Quinton Flynn in the second season.
- The Human Torch appears in the Spider-Man: The Animated Series three-part episode "Secret Wars", voiced again by Quinton Flynn.
- The Human Torch appears in Fantastic Four: World's Greatest Heroes, voiced by Christopher Jacot.
- The Human Torch appears in The Super Hero Squad Show, voiced by Travis Willingham.
- The Fantastic Four (2005) incarnation of the Human Torch appears in Robot Chicken, voiced again by Chris Evans, as well as Dax Shepard.
- The Human Torch appears in The Avengers: Earth's Mightiest Heroes, voiced by David Kaufman.
- The Human Torch appears in the Hulk and the Agents of S.M.A.S.H. episode "Monsters No More", voiced by James Arnold Taylor.

=== Film ===
- The Human Torch appears in The Fantastic Four (1994), portrayed by Jay Underwood.
- The Human Torch appears in Fantastic Four (2005), portrayed by Chris Evans.
- The Human Torch appears in Fantastic Four: Rise of the Silver Surfer, portrayed again by Chris Evans. Across two encounters with the Silver Surfer, he temporarily obtains the ability to switch powers with his teammates through touch.
- The Human Torch appears in Fantastic Four (2015), portrayed by Michael B. Jordan. This version is the adoptive brother of Susan Storm who gained his powers during a botched expedition to Planet Zero and initially used a suit to control them.
- The Fantastic Four (2005) incarnation of the Human Torch appears in the Marvel Cinematic Universe (MCU) film Deadpool & Wolverine (2024), portrayed again by Chris Evans. He was exiled to the Void by the Time Variance Authority (TVA) and joined a resistance movement against Cassandra Nova, who later murders him.
- The Human Torch appears in the MCU film The Fantastic Four: First Steps (2025), portrayed by Joseph Quinn.
- The Human Torch will appear in the MCU films Avengers: Doomsday (2026) and Avengers: Secret Wars (2027), portrayed again by Joseph Quinn.

=== Video games ===
- The Human Torch appears in Questprobe featuring Human Torch and the Thing.
- The Human Torch appears in The Amazing Spider-Man 2.
- The Human Torch appears in Spider-Man (1995).
- The Human Torch appears in Fantastic Four (1997).
- The Human Torch appears in Spider-Man (2000), voiced by Daran Norris.
- The Human Torch appears in Fantastic 4: Flame On.
- The Human Torch appears as a playable character in Fantastic Four (2005), voiced by Chris Evans. Additionally, his "classic" design appears in bonus levels, voiced again by Quinton Flynn.
- The Ultimate Marvel incarnation of the Human Torch appears in Ultimate Spider-Man, voiced by David Kaufman.
- The Human Torch, based on Chris Evans' portrayal, appears in Fantastic Four: Rise of the Silver Surfer, voiced by Michael Broderick.
- The Human Torch appears as a playable character in Marvel Nemesis: Rise of the Imperfects, voiced by Kirby Morrow.
- The Human Torch appears as a playable character in Marvel: Ultimate Alliance, voiced by Josh Keaton. Additionally, his classic, Ultimate Marvel, original, and modern designs appear as alternate skins.
- The Human Torch appears as a playable character in Marvel: Ultimate Alliance 2, voiced again by David Kaufman.
- The Human Torch appears as a playable character in Marvel Super Hero Squad Online, voiced by Antony Del Rio.
- The Human Torch appears in LittleBigPlanet via the "Marvel Costume Kit 2" DLC.
- The Human Torch appears in Pinball FX 2, voiced by Travis Willingham.
- The Human Torch appears as a playable character in Marvel: Future Fight.
- The Human Torch appears as a playable character in Marvel: Avengers Alliance.
- The Human Torch appears as a playable character in Marvel Avengers: Battle for Earth, voiced by Roger Craig Smith.
- The Human Torch initially appeared as a playable character in Marvel Heroes, voiced by Matthew Yang King, before he was removed on July 1, 2017 for legal reasons.
- The Human Torch appears as a playable character in Lego Marvel Super Heroes, voiced again by Roger Craig Smith.
- The Human Torch appears as a playable character in Marvel Puzzle Quest.
- The Human Torch appears as a downloadable playable character in Marvel Ultimate Alliance 3: The Black Order via the "Shadow of Doom" DLC, voiced again by Matthew Yang King.
- The Human Torch appears as a downloadable playable character in Marvel Rivals, voiced by Scott Whyte.
- The Human Torch appears in Fortnite as part of a promotional shop item.

=== Miscellaneous ===
- Johnny Storm appears in a daily radio adaptation of the early issues of Fantastic Four, played by Bill Murray.
- The Human Torch appears in the BBC radio adaptation of Spider Man, voiced by Eric Meyers.
- Johnny Storm appears in the Marvel and Stitcher scripted podcast adaptation of Marvels, voiced by Ehad Berisha.

=== Merchandise ===
- The Human Torch received an 8-inch action figure in Mego's "World's Greatest Super Heroes" toy line in the 1970s.
- The Human Torch received several action figures in the Marvel Legends toy line.
- The Human Torch received a figurine in The Classic Marvel Figurine Collection.

== Reception ==
The Human Torch was ranked as the 90th greatest comic book character by Wizard magazine. IGN ranked the Human Torch as the 46th greatest comic book hero, stating that even though the youngest member of the Fantastic Four routinely basked in the glory of his celebrity status, he also proved himself in his many adventures with both the Fantastic Four and Spider-Man.

== Collected editions ==
Title	Material collected	Published date	ISBN
Human Torch Masterworks Vol. 1	Strange Tales #101-117 and Annual #2	August 2009	978-0785120704
Human Torch Masterworks Vol. 2	Strange Tales #118-134	August 2009	978-0785135050
Essential Human Torch Volume 1	Strange Tales #101-134 and Annual #2	August 2003	978-0785113096
Human Torch: Strange Tales - The Complete Collection	Strange Tales #101-134 and Annual #2	August 2018	978-1302913342
Spider-Man & The Human Torch	Spider-Man/Human Torch #1-5	August 2009	978-0785140047
The Thing & The Human Torch by Dan Slott	Spider-Man/Human Torch #1-5, The Thing #1-8	August 2018	978-1302913359
Human Torch by Karl Kesel & Skottie Young: The Complete Collection	Human Torch (vol. 3) #1-12	July 2014	978-0785190981
Marvel Two-In-One Vol. 1: Fate Of The Four	Marvel Two-In-One (vol. 2) #1-6	July 2018	978-1302910921
Marvel Two-In-One Vol. 2: Next Of Kin	Marvel Two-In-One (vol. 2) #7-12 and Annual #1	February 2019	978-1302914912
