= Jack of Hearts (Marvel Comics) =

Marvel Comics fictional character

Publication information
- Publisher: Marvel Comics
- First appearance: The Deadly Hands of Kung Fu #22 (March 1976)
- Created by: Bill Mantlo (writer); Keith Giffen (artist)

In-story information
- Alter ego: Jonathan "Jack" Hart
- Species: Human-Contraxian hybrid
- Team affiliations: The Avengers; The Defenders; Fantastic Four
- Abilities: Concussive blasts Flight; Ability to survive unaided in space Sensitive brain that senses motion Increased intelligence, strength, durability, and memory

Jack of Hearts (Jack Hart) is a fictional superhero appearing in American comic books published by Marvel Comics. The character first appeared in The Deadly Hands of Kung Fu #22 (March 1976), and was created by writer Bill Mantlo and artist Keith Giffen. He starred in his own four-issue mini series and has been a regular character in the Iron Man comics as well as at one point being a member of the Avengers.

Jack of Hearts is the son of scientist Philip Hart (creator of "Zero Fluid") and an alien woman from the Contraxian race. As a young man, Jack was doused in Zero Fluid and gained super powers which he could not control. In an attempt to control his powers, Jack of Hearts built a containment suit that resembled the Jack of Hearts playing card. The lack of control became a recurring theme with Jack of Hearts, including his stint in the Avengers where he had to spend 14 hours a day in a containment room to prevent self-destruction. When his powers became uncontrollable he chose to leave Earth, exploding in space without harming any innocent bystanders.

The return of Jack of Hearts and the explosion that killed Scott Lang was the launching point of the 2004-05 "Avengers Disassembled". The character was resurrected as part of one of the Marvel Zombies mini-series where Zero Energy reforms into Jack of Hearts, bringing the character back to life. The Zombies were later defeated with the help of Jack of Hearts.

== Publication history ==
Jack of Hearts first appeared in the black and white magazine The Deadly Hands of Kung Fu #22 (March 1976), and was created by writer Bill Mantlo and illustrator Keith Giffen. He was presented as an antagonist for the superhero White Tiger but his origin story in the following issue established him as a hero. His debut appearance in a color comic book was in The Incredible Hulk vol. 2 #214 (Aug. 1977) where he fights the Hulk. He later serves a brief stint as an ally and apprentice of Iron Man, becoming a regular cast member of the series during Mantlo's tenure as writer.

Jack has made various guest appearances in several books over the years, including Marvel Two-in-One, The Defenders, Marvel Premiere, (in a solo story meant to launch the character in his own series) ROM, and Marvel Team-Up, (which served as an intro to his 1984 mini-series) among others. He starred in his own self-titled, four issue limited series from January to April 1984.

He was later made a regular in The Avengers by writer Kurt Busiek, who explained, "I first ran into Jack in The Deadly Hands of Kung Fu in an issue drawn by Gil Kane and Rico Rival. That great overcomplicated costume and the energy that Gil put into the storytelling hooked me, and I’ve been a fan ever since".

In issue #40 of the 6th Fantastic Four series (dated February 2022), the character joined the titular team as a replacement for the Human Torch.

== Fictional character biography ==
=== Early life ===
Jack Hart was born in New Haven, Connecticut. He is the son of Philip Hart, a scientist who created an energy source called "zero fluid", and Marie, a Contraxian alien. After being exposed to a vat of zero fluid, Jack underwent a mutagenic change and gained the ability to project concussive energy from his body. After gaining these powers, Jack begins a mission of vengeance against the Corporation that killed his father. As a new hero, Jack asked Iron Man to take him on as an apprentice.

=== Being a hero ===
Jack moves past his mission of vengeance and becomes a true hero, working with various other superheroes such as the Defenders. He later reunites with college girlfriend Marcy Kane, who offers to help find a cure for Jack's dangerous powers. Kane turns out to be a Contraxian agent sent to Earth to find Jack. Kane takes Jack to Contraxia, where he energizes its dying sun. Jack emerges from the sun with greatly enhanced powers. After struggling to reduce the damage from his new form, Jack leaves to wander outer space in exile. Jack returns to Earth during the Kang War and is accepted as a member of the Avengers.

=== Death and return ===
When his power levels increase beyond the capacity for his containment suit, Jack of Hearts chooses to commit suicide rather than continue living in an isolated containment room for 14 hours a day. He flies into Earth's orbit, where he explodes.

Iron Lad transports the Young Avengers and the amnesiac Wanda Maximoff, no longer the Scarlet Witch, back to the onset of the "Avengers Disassembled" storyline, when Jack was used as a weapon to destroy the Avengers. Jack pleads with Wanda not to go through with her plan, unaware that he is facing a different Wanda. The pity of this and the horror of seeing Jack blow himself up shocks Wanda into recovering her memories and powers.

In the series Marvel Zombies Supreme. a team of special operatives led by Jill Harper and Battlestar come across a source of zero-point energy which Harper believes can help them stop the zombies. The zero-point energy unexpectedly reforms into corporeal form as Jack of Hearts, who is left temporarily amnesiac following his resurrection.

Jack appears in the storyline "Reckoning War", in which he aids the Fantastic Four in battling the Reckoning. Jack later appears in the series She-Hulk (2022), where he attempts to uncover the reason for his resurrection.

== Powers and abilities ==
Jack Hart's superhuman powers are as a result of the mutagenic effect of his father's "Zero Fluid", combined with the alien genes from his Contraxian mother. He has superhuman stamina and durability. Jack is able to generate "zero energy" within his body and project it as concussive force or intense heat or as a propellant to fly. He can survive unprotected in space. Jack's brain has incorporated the artificial intelligence of a computerized device called the Scanalyzer, enabling him to think with the speed of a computer and store and retrieve information with a computer-like capacity and efficiency. Jack commonly uses a suit of armor that contains his energy.

Jack is a fair hand-to-hand combatant, having received training from S.H.I.E.L.D.

== In other media ==
Jack of Hearts makes non-speaking appearances in Silver Surfer.
