= Nova (Frankie Raye) =

Frankie Raye Nova
- Nova, in Fearless Defenders #12 (June 2008). Art by William Sliney.

Publication information
- Publisher: Marvel Comics
- First appearance: Fantastic Four #164 (November 1975)
- Created by: Roy Thomas (writer); George Pérez (artist)

In-story information
- Alter ego: Frankie Raye
- Species: Human mutate
- Team affiliations: Heralds of Galactus; Fantastic Four
- Supporting character of: Fantastic Four; Silver Surfer
- Abilities: Use of Power Cosmic

Nova (Frankie Raye) is a character appearing in American comic books published by Marvel Comics. Created by writer Roy Thomas and artist George Pérez, the character first appeared in Fantastic Four #164 (November 1975).

Frankie Raye was portrayed by Beau Garrett in the 2007 film Fantastic Four: Rise of the Silver Surfer.

== Publication history ==
The character first appeared as Frankie Raye in Fantastic Four #164 (November 1975) and was created by writer Roy Thomas and artist George Pérez. After several years as a minor supporting character, she became a herald of Galactus and assumed the name "Nova" in Fantastic Four #244 (July 1982) by John Byrne. The character was killed in Silver Surfer #75 (December 1992). Writer Kathryn Immonen and artist Tonči Zonjić revived Frankie Raye in the Heralds limited series in 2010.

== Fictional character biography ==
While working for the United Nations as an interpreter, Frankie Raye meets Johnny Storm and becomes his girlfriend, despite her fear of fire. The couple soon breaks up, despite an attempt at reconciliation by Johnny. A brief encounter by the two some time later results in an unpleasant reaction by Frankie. They eventually begin to see each other again. Her fear is eventually explained to be the result of a mental block induced by her stepfather, Phineas Horton, after she was accidentally doused with the chemicals which caused the android original Human Torch (his creation) to burst into flame, in an attempt to prevent her from using the Torch-like powers granted to her by the accident.

After breaking through the block, she regains her full memory and discovers her previously repressed superhuman powers. She aids the Fantastic Four for a short time, until she volunteers to become the new herald of Galactus. She takes the name "Nova". Having previously demonstrated what the Fantastic Four deemed an alarming willingness to kill opponents, she claims to have no compunction about leading him to sentient populated planets and proves that when she leads the Devourer of Worlds to the Skrull home-world to consume it. Nova later attends the trial of Reed Richards by the Shi'ar Empire. When Richard Rider resumes his Nova identity alongside the New Warriors, he is briefly called "Kid Nova" to distinguish him from Raye.

Frankie Raye (as the Human Torch) joins the Fantastic Four in battle. Cover of Fantastic Four #239 (Feb. 1982). Art by John Byrne

Nova is later rescued from Skrull imprisonment by the Silver Surfer, whom she meets for the first time. She then battles the Elders of the Universe. Galactus sends her to locate one of them, the Contemplator, and she is joined in this quest by the Silver Surfer. They journey to the Coalsack Nebula where they are captured by Captain Reptyl. After battling Captain Reptyl, Nova battles Ronan the Accuser. This is followed by a clash with a Skrull duplicate of the Silver Surfer and a romantic flirtation with the real Silver Surfer. Nova and Galactus battle the In-Betweener. Nova then turns her romantic interests toward Firelord.

Nova later encounters an injured Elan. She battles the second Star-Stalker, and then meets the Power Pack. A stimulator device temporarily renders her evil, until she is subdued by Reed and Franklin Richards, and Power Pack.

Frankie Raye is ultimately killed by the alien Morg, who replaced her as Galactus' herald. The demon Mephisto later makes it appear that she returned from the dead in a failed bid to steal the soul of the Silver Surfer.

== Powers and abilities ==
Nova originally gained her superhuman powers after being mutated by exposure to unknown chemicals. Originally, she had powers similar to that of the Human Torch: flame generation, projection, and flight.

Nova later gains vastly increased powers after Galactus imbues her with the Power Cosmic. She possesses superhuman physical abilities as well as the ability to project energy from across the electromagnetic spectrum and fly at faster-than-light speeds.

== Reception ==
- In 2016, Comic Book Resources (CBR) ranked Frankie Raye / Nova 13th in their "Straight Fire: The Hottest Heroes in Comics" list.
- In 2018, CBR ranked Frankie Raye / Nova 9th in their "Top 20 Heralds Of Galactus, Ranked By Power" list.

== Other versions ==
An alternate universe version of Hercules encounters Nova in the 24th century in the first Hercules limited series by writer/artist Bob Layton.

Writer-penciler John Byrne and inker Terry Austin produced a serialized story titled "The Last Galactus Story", which appeared in the anthology comics-magazine Epic Illustrated #26-34 (October 1984 - February 1986), and detailed an all-new adventure for the character. The magazine published the first nine serialized installments of what was to be a 10-part tale. Each ran six pages, with the exception of part eight, which ran 12 pages. The magazine was cancelled in February 1986, leaving the last chapter unpublished and the story unfinished. According to Byrne, the story would have concluded with a dying Galactus releasing his power, causing a new Big Bang and transforming Nova into his successor.

During the Fantastic Four's fight with Abraxas, they briefly ally with an alternate version of Nova. It is revealed at the conclusion that she is actually allied with Abraxas after her Galactus destroyed Earth even after accepting her as his herald. Nova transferred her anger for her failure to the Fantastic Four of the Earth-616 universe in the absence of her own. Abraxas subsequently draws in an army of Novas who experienced similar traumas to keep the Fantastic Four occupied while he acquires the Ultimate Nullifier. The Fantastic Four summon the assistance of an army of alternate Avengers to keep the Novas occupied.

== In other media ==
=== Television ===
- Frankie Raye / Nova appears in the Fantastic Four episode "When Calls Galactus", voiced by Leeza Miller McGee.
- Frankie Raye / Nova appears in Silver Surfer, voiced by Tara Rosling. This version is a mutant with clairvoyant and teleportation powers who Galactus recruited to replace the Silver Surfer as his herald.
- Frankie Raye appears in the Fantastic Four: World's Greatest Heroes episode "Zoned Out", voiced by Tabitha St. Germain.

=== Film ===
Frankie Raye appears in Fantastic Four: Rise of the Silver Surfer, portrayed by Beau Garrett. This version is a U.S. Army captain.

=== Merchandise ===
- In 2011, Diamond Select Toys released a Frankie Raye / Nova figure as part of the Toys "R" Us exclusive Heralds of Galactus boxset.
- In 2021, Hasbro released a Frankie Raye / Nova action figure as part of the Marvel Legends action figure line.
