= Reptyl =

Marvel Comics fictional character

Publication information
- Publisher: Marvel Comics
- First appearance: Silver Surfer (vol. 3) #11 (May 1988)
- Created by: Steve Englehart and Joe Staton

In-story information
- Notable aliases: Reptyl Prime, Cap'n Reptyl, the Non-human

Reptyl is a fictional character appearing in American comic books published by Marvel Comics, primarily as an enemy of the Silver Surfer.

== Fictional character biography ==
Cap'n Reptyl was born on an unnamed planet in the Coalsack Nebula. He later became the leader of a band of space pirates. He shelters a Skrull posing as the Contemplator from Galactus's vengeance. Reptyl captures the Silver Surfer and Galactus's herald Nova, but is forced to release the Surfer. He later exchanges his crew with the Stranger for Empress S'byll of the Skrull and forms an alliance. Reptyl leads the Skrull fleet against the Kree fleet, and is almost killed by Clumsy Foulup. He is later attacked by the Super-Skrull and cast adrift in space.

Reptyl survives and metamorphoses into Reptyl Prime. Following another encounter with the Silver Surfer, he intends to become the progenitor of reptilian evolution. Reptyl is later given god-like powers by Thanos. Shortly afterward, Reptyl loses his newfound abilities and reverts to his normal power level.

== Powers and abilities ==
Reptyl is an alien who possesses superhuman strength, speed, stamina, durability, agility, and reflexes, as well as a vulnerability to extreme cold. He is an experienced armed and unarmed combatant, a highly skilled leader and space pilot, and a master of most known hand weapons. Additionally, Reptyl wields a ray-pistol and sword.

As Reptyl Prime, Reptyl resembles a humanoid dragon. He is able to fly at high speeds, expel cosmic energy in the form of concussive blasts, and survive in space unprotected. Additionally, he lacks his original form's vulnerability to cold.

== In other media ==
Reptyl appears as a boss in Silver Surfer (1990).
