= Morg =

- Morg from Silver Surfer (vol. 3) #109 (1995). Art by Tom Grindberg.

Publication information
- Publisher: Marvel Comics
- First appearance: Silver Surfer (vol. 3) #69 (August 1992)
- Created by: Ron Marz; Ron Lim

In-story information
- Team affiliations: Heralds of Galactus
- Abilities: Use of Power Cosmic

Morg is a supervillain appearing in American comic books published by Marvel Comics. The character is usually depicted as a herald of Galactus. He was created by Ron Lim and Ron Marz and first appeared in Silver Surfer (vol. 3) #69 (August 1992).

== Fictional character biography ==
=== Origin ===
Morg served as a herald of Galactus after Galactus' previous herald, Nova, was expelled for sparing suitable but inhabited planets from his hunger. Prior to consuming his latest planet, Galactus was confronted by Morg, a court executioner who had betrayed his own race by executing his own people and was not afraid of Galactus. Impressed with Morg's demeanor and wary after losing several heralds to attacks of conscience, Galactus decided to recruit Morg as his latest herald.

=== Galactus' herald ===
One of Galactus' former heralds, the Silver Surfer, goes to meet Nova, but learns that she has been dismissed and replaced with Morg. After informing the Surfer of this, Galactus tells him to leave. The Surfer refuses to leave without seeing Nova, resulting in a battle with Morg. After fighting Morg and noticing his heartlessness, the Surfer decides to go find Nova and the rest of Galactus's former heralds and have them join him in fighting Morg.

Silver Surfer recruits Firelord, Nova, Terrax, and Air-Walker to his cause. Meanwhile, Morg discovers a well containing "mystical power", which enhances his powers exponentially. While battling Galactus' heralds, Morg kills Nova and injures Air-Walker. Galactus removes the Power Cosmic from Morg, leaving him with only the power he had gained from the pool. In his weakened state, Morg is killed by Terrax.

Galactus resurrects Morg to give him a second chance. However, Morg is captured by Tyrant alongside Silver Surfer, Gladiator, Beta Ray Bill, Jack of Hearts, and Ganymede. Morg obtains the Ultimate Nullifier and uses it against Tyrant, melting Tyrant's body. Morg then cuts off one of his arms to stop the Nullifier from killing him. Morg is unable to escape the Nullifier and is killed when it explodes.

Morg returns to life through unrevealed means. When the alien Reckoning threaten the life of Eternity, Morg and the heralds of Galactus work to resurrect Galactus so that he can save Eternity.

== Powers and abilities ==
Morg was imbued with the Power Cosmic by Galactus, as he did with all his heralds. The physical transformation by the cosmic power of Galactus allowed Morg to fly through space and granted him exponentially enhanced superhuman strength, speed, stamina, durability, agility, and reflexes. Morg can manipulate cosmic energy for various effects, including the projection of energy bolts of cosmic force, the augmentation of his strength to even greater superhuman levels, and survive unprotected in the vacuum of outer space without the need of oxygen, food or sleep. Morg carried a double-bladed cosmic axe that can emanate waves of destructive force sufficiently powerful to rend a tear in Galactus's ship and create highly impervious force shields.

== In other media ==
- A Morg Minimate was produced as part of the Toys "R" Us exclusive Heralds of Galactus boxset.
- A Marvel Legends figure of Morg was produced as part of the HasLab Marvel Legends line.
