= Reckoning War =

2022 Marvel Comics storyline

- Publisher: Marvel Comics
- Publication date: February – July 2022
- Genre: Superhero
Title(s)
Fantastic Four (vol. 6) #39–45
- Main characters: Fantastic Four; Uatu; Doctor Doom; She-Hulk; Jack of Hearts; Nick Fury; Silver Surfer; Watchers; the Reckoning; Prosilicans

Creative team
- Writer: Dan Slott
- Artist: Rachael Stott
- Penciller: Carlos Pacheco
- Letterer: Joe Caramagna
- Colorist(s): Guru-eFX, Jesus Aburtov
- Editor: C. B. Cebulski

"Reckoning War" is an American comic book storyline written by Dan Slott with art by Rachael Stott, Carlos Pacheco and Andrea De Vito published from February to June 2022 by Marvel Comics. This story deals with the Fantastic Four clashing with the Reckoning, a group of aliens derived from a mysterious race called the Prosilicans, who orchestrate multiple alien invasions causing a catastrophic cosmic war, which also features Uatu, Nick Fury, Doctor Doom, the Silver Surfer, the She-Hulk, Galactus, and Jack of Hearts.

The event overall received mixed reviews from critics, with criticism for the plot, art, action, and lack of interesting characters. Many critics deemed it an unsatisfactory conclusion to Dan Slott's run on Fantastic Four.

== Plot ==
=== Prelude ===
She-Hulk is taken by the Time Variance Authority due to her actions in the future. The Time Variance Authority take her to the future, where her actions will cause a war between Earth and mysterious beings which will cause the Watchers to break their non-intervention oath. During the trial, She-Hulk is allowed to continue existing thanks to the Time Variance Authority seeing how much of an effect she has had on different people.

After the events of "Empyre", Nick Fury is observing the Fantastic Four and the Avengers celebrating the relocation of the Cotati when Uatu appears out of Fury's eye socket and tells him that "there shall be a reckoning". As Uatu rebuilds his homebase, he opens his mind to Fury while exploring the visual archives known as the Cyclopedia Universum, where Uatu learns that his siblings bonded Fury with him as Fury was silently watching the universe. Uatu explains that there is a Reckoning War coming, and everyone needs to prepare. While he cannot commute Fury's sentence, he does release him from his chains as Fury makes a new eyepatch.

=== Main plot ===
One billion years ago, the Prosilicans were one of the first alien races the Watchers (originally known as the Luminous) provided technical support. The Prosilicans became greedy and sought to use the Watchers' technology to take over planets, which caused an all-out war throughout the entire cosmos. The Luminous managed to defeat the Prosilicans by destroying nine-tenth of the universe. After their defeat, the Prosilicans were sealed in an isolated toxic wasteland known as the Barrens. The remaining Prosilicans renamed themselves "the Reckoning" and swearing revenge against the Watchers who imprisoned them. In the present day, Eternity is poisoned by the catastrophic cosmic war the Prosilicans orchestrated. The Queen of Nevers instructs the Silver Surfer to find a mysterious remedy to save Eternity from dying.

Ruins reveals that the Prosicilans' plan is not to destroy the universe, but to gain control of three existing Nexuses of Reality, including the M'Kraan Crystal. On Earth, the alien warrior Cormorant arrives to retrieve the pieces of his armor under the instruction of his master, Helmsman. While confronting Cormorant in the Florida Everglades, Doctor Doom persuades Cormorant to aid him as his ally to fight against the Reckoning, then summons Helmsman and kills him.

Wielding the power of the M'Kraan Crystal, Wrath and his army attack the Watchers' homebase. The Watcher Emnu arrives and attacks them until he is stunned by the Invisible Woman. Susan revealed that she has been following Fury this whole time as well as spying on the Watchers. During her mission, she overheard Ikor's instructions and follows Emnu to "the Apex". Uatu explains to them that "the Apex of All Reality" is a gateway to multiple possibilities which the Watchers observed universes. Uatu also reveals that the Watchers originated from the planet Lumina and Planet T-39X is the Apex's homeworld. After Lumina was destroyed in the First War, the Watchers settled on T-37X.

It is revealed that Emnu created the Ultimate Nullifier, which he used to help eradicate the Prosilicans and end the First War. Uatu confirmed that the Watchers were responsible for the destruction, which was also the main cause of their vow of non-inference. Valeria Richards hijacks the Forever Gate and sets up a trap for Ruins and his soldiers in the Thought Space, a dimension where thoughts manifest into reality. The Cyclopedia Universum causes Reed Richards's brain to expand, transforming him into a Watcher-like being, but giving him less than 10 hours to live. This side effect allows Reed to rebuild the Forever Gate.

Doom and Cormorant arrive in time to confront the Reckoning, in which Comorant tears Reject apart, Rapture disarms Doom, and Wrath subdues Cormorant by reprogramming his armor. As Rapture is about to kill Doom, the Fantastic Four and the Silver Surfer arrive to make their final stand against them, and Wrath informs Rapture to retrieve the Ultimate Nullifier while the Thing challenges her for a rematch and recovers the Ultimate Nullifier. Reed Richards sacrifices himself by activating the Ultimate Nullifier, which erases Wrath from existence.

Reed Richards survives and is miraculously cured, reverting to his former self because of the Ultimate Nullifier, which neutralized most of the Watchers' energy from him. With Wrath nullified, the M'Kraan Crystal shards become unstable and self-destruct. Uatu emerges, now imbued with cosmic power from "the Apex", and addressing himself as the One and Only Watcher. Uatu acknowledges the cause of all the death and destruction from the Watchers' interference and decides to rectify all of their actions. Uatu teleports them to the very edge of existence known as the Great Barriers, where they find the remnants of the First War covered by the Barrens. Uatu erases all the toxic Barrens from existence and recovers the destroyed nine-tenths of the universe, renaming it the Borderlands.

Uatu restores the M'Kraan Crystal with Emnu, Ruins, and Rapture encased inside it. Cormorant is welcomed by the Shi'ar Imperial Guard and decides to safeguard the crystal. The Richards family decides to deactivate the Forever Gate, believing that it is too dangerous to leave it open. Doctor Doom secretly plans to build his own Forever Gate after scanning all the data recorded from his armor.

=== Tie-in issue ===
While Uatu was imprisoned in Dar-kenda (the Watchers' prison), Ikor takes Uatu to "the Seat of All Knowledge" for interrogation. When he extracts Uatu's visions, Ikor suspects that Uatu has been hiding one What If vision he never wanted to show anyone: "What If Uatu The Watcher Had Never Interfered?" In this alternate universe, the Silver Surfer arrives on Earth and sends the message allowing Galactus to invade Earth without Uatu's warning of the upcoming threat, and the Fantastic Four are overwhelmed by Galactus's power without Uatu providing information and knowledge of the Ultimate Nullifier that could stop Galactus from destroying Earth. Instead of using the Ultimate Nullifier, Reed built a device known as the Ultimate Nullification Ray that helps kill Galactus without knowing the consequence of Galactus's presence and the Surfer departs in relief without acknowledging the lessons of humanity, leaving the alternate version of Uatu's satisfaction of non-intervention. Realizing that the vision he saw is false, Uatu pleads with Ikor to release him; however, Ikor ignores him as he had brainwashed him and falsely claimed that Uatu's intervention was a mistake, forcing Uatu to submit in despair and regret. After hearing the conversation about the Great Gathering and Ikor's tolerance of Uatu's warning, Fury decides to free Uatu without any other Watchers detecting his presence.

== Reading order ==
- Fantastic Four (vol. 6) #39 (prologue)
- Fantastic Four: Reckoning War Alpha #1
- Fantastic Four (vol. 6) #40
- Fantastic Four (vol. 6) #41
- Reckoning War: Trial of the Watcher #1 (tie-in issue)
- Fantastic Four (vol. 6) #42
- Fantastic Four (vol. 6) #43
- Fantastic Four (vol. 6) #44
- Fantastic Four (vol. 6) #45 (epilogue)

== Critical reception ==
According to Comic Book Roundup, Fantastic Four: Reckoning War Alpha #1 received an average rating of 7.5 out of 10 based on six reviews.

According to Comic Book Roundup, Fantastic Four (vol. 6) #40 received an average rating of 7.7 out of 10 based on six reviews.

According to Comic Book Roundup, Fantastic Four (vol. 6) #41 received an average rating of 6.7 out of 10 based on three reviews.

According to Comic Book Roundup, Reckoning War: Trial of the Watcher #1 received an average rating of 8.1 out of 10 based on eleven reviews.

According to Comic Book Roundup, Fantastic Four (vol. 6) #42 received an average rating of 7.3 out of 10 based on five reviews.

According to Comic Book Roundup, Fantastic Four (vol. 6) #43 received an average rating of 7 out of 10 based on five reviews.

According to Comic Book Roundup, Fantastic Four (vol. 6) #44 received an average rating of 6.9 out of 10 based on four reviews.

According to Comic Book Roundup, Fantastic Four (vol. 6) #45 received an average rating of 7.1 out of 10 based on five reviews.

== Collected editions ==
Title	Material collected	Published date	ISBN
Fantastic Four Vol. 10: Reckoning War Part I	Fantastic Four (vol. 6) #40–42, Fantastic Four: Reckoning War Alpha #1, Reckoning War: Trial of the Watcher #1	July 2022	978-1302932626
Fantastic Four Vol. 11: Reckoning War Part II	Fantastic Four (vol. 6) #43–46	November 2022	978-1302946548
