= Firelord (character) =

- Firelord as depicted in Avengers #258 (August 1985). Art by John Buscema.

Publication information
- Publisher: Marvel Comics
- First appearance: Thor #225 (July 1974)
- Created by: Gerry Conway (writer); John Buscema (artist)

In-story information
- Alter ego: Pyreus Kril
- Species: Xandarian
- Team affiliations: Heralds of Galactus; Nova Corps; United Front
- Notable aliases: Nova Centurion
- Abilities: Use of Power Cosmic; Superhuman strength, reflexes and durability Flight; Mastery of the electromagnetic spectrum Total immunity to the rigors of space Capable of travelling faster than the speed of light Wields a flaming staff Energy projection via his eyes and staff

Firelord (Pyreus Kril) is a character appearing in American comic books published by Marvel Comics.

== Publication history ==
Firelord first appears in Thor #225 (July 1974) and was created by writer Gerry Conway and penciler John Buscema.

== Fictional character biography ==
Pyreus Kril is a Xandarian who was born on the planet Xandar, in the Andromeda Galaxy. He is a graduate of the Nova Corps Academy, the military and exploratory force of Xandar. During his commission, he served aboard a Xandarian ship under the command of Gabriel Lan. Gabriel and Pyreus became friends, until Gabriel was abducted by the cosmic entity Galactus and transformed into his herald, Air-Walker. Pyreus assumes command as captain and begins an obsessive search for Gabriel. Pyreus eventually locates Galactus' vessel and confronts the entity, only to discover that Gabriel was killed in combat. Galactus tells this to Pyreus only after he agrees to serve him as his latest herald.

Pyreus is then transformed into Firelord, and after a period of servitude asked for his freedom. Galactus agrees on the condition that Firelord find a replacement. Firelord travels to Earth, and after an encounter with both Thor and Hercules, is freed when Thor presents Galactus with the armor of the Destroyer to animate and use as a herald. After aiding Thor on several occasions, Firelord returns to deep space. He returns months later with the Shi'ar agent Erik the Red, who tricks Firelord into battling the X-Men.

Several years later, Firelord discovers that Air-Walker has been replaced with a robotic replica. Firelord has since aided his fellow herald Silver Surfer on a number of occasions, particularly against Morg.

=== Annihilation ===
Firelord battles the Annihilation Wave alongside his fellow heralds, including Red Shift and Stardust. Although wounded at one point, Firelord recovers and seeks vengeance against the remnants of the forces of Annihilus for destroying Xandar.

== Powers and abilities ==
Pyreus Kril was a normal Xandarian man until he was transformed by Galactus. Given mastery over the cosmic flame, Firelord wields a flaming staff and can project energy from his eyes and staff. Like all heralds, the Power Cosmic provides Firelord with superhuman strength, reflexes and durability, flight, mastery of the electromagnetic spectrum and total immunity to the rigors of space. Firelord is also capable of travelling faster than the speed of light.

Pyreus Kril graduated from the Xandarian Nova Corps Academy, and in addition to a thorough knowledge of combat has knowledge of advanced alien technology and space navigation.

== Other versions ==
=== Guardians of the Galaxy ===
An alternate universe version of Firelord appears in the series Guardians of the Galaxy. This version is an ally of the Guardians of the Galaxy and a member of its sub-group, the Galactic Guardians.

=== Heroes Reborn ===
An alternate universe version of Firelord appears in "Heroes Reborn". This version is a herald of Galactus who is worshipped by the Inhumans.

=== Marvel Zombies 2 ===
A zombified alternate universe version of Firelord appears in Marvel Zombies 2.

== In other media ==
=== Television ===
- Firelord appears in the Fantastic Four episode "The Silver Surfer and the Coming of Galactus", voiced by Alan Oppenheimer.
- Firelord makes non-speaking appearances in The Super Hero Squad Show.
- Firelord makes a non-speaking appearance in The Avengers: Earth's Mightiest Heroes episode "Avengers Assemble".
- Firelord appears in the Hulk and the Agents of S.M.A.S.H. episode "Planet Hulk", voiced by John DiMaggio.

=== Video games ===
- Firelord appears as a boss in Silver Surfer.
