= Silver Surfer (video game) =

1990 video game

- Cover art by Joe Jusko
- Developer: Software Creations
- Publisher: Arcadia Systems
- Directors: Graeme Devine; Rob Landeros
- Programmer: Kevin Edwards
- Artists: Neal Sutton; Craig Houston; Anthony Anderson
- Composers: Tim Follin; Geoff Follin
- Platform: Nintendo Entertainment System
- Release: NA: November 1990
- Genre: Scrolling shooter
- Mode: Single-player

Silver Surfer is a 1990 scrolling shoot 'em up video game developed by Software Creations and published by Arcadia Systems. It was released in November 1990 in the United States exclusively for the Nintendo Entertainment System. The game is based on the Marvel Comics character Silver Surfer, and is primarily known for its high difficulty and highly praised music. It was re-released as part of the Marvel MaXimum Collection compilation in 2026.

== Gameplay and synopsis ==
Silver Surfer is widely regarded as one of the hardest games on the NES, a quintessential example of a "Nintendo hard" game.

In Silver Surfer, the player controls the character Silver Surfer through various levels that alternate between a side-scrolling and an overhead perspective.

Each stage is divided into sections. At the end of each section, a mini-boss appears, and the Silver Surfer must shoot the main enemy while many other enemies attack as well. These are the only times where the screen stops scrolling forward. The third and final section contains a super-villain from the comic book series who will take more hits to defeat. The villains featured in the game are Reptyl, Mephisto, Possessor, Fire Lord, and Kylor, the self-proclaimed emperor of the Skrull.

After the first set of levels is complete, Galactus appears and sends Silver Surfer on a final mission into the Magik Domain to collect a "Cosmic Device" from a villain whose identity is less than clear. Despite previous claims, the final boss is actually a giant purple being with a handgun that does not appear to have been in the comics, although the image near the boss's health bar suggests that the main antagonist is X-Men villain Mister Sinister. Once Silver Surfer defeats him, the rest of the Cosmic Device is his; he tells Galactus that no one must have access to it and hides it for safe keeping so it may not fall into the wrong hands.

The game has a password feature that allows a number of upgrades, such as invincibility. The game has cut-scenes between the levels to move the story line ahead, and allows the player to pick the levels in any order, similar to the Mega Man games. The game also features two additional 'quests', the first of which is unlocked by entering a password given to the player upon completing the "Magik Domain" mission.

Silver Surfer is armed with silver pellets that shoot out of his hands to destroy enemies and their projectiles. The player can collect silver spheres that serve as "options", which shoot additional pellets alongside the Silver Surfer. By pressing the B button, the spheres switch position to shoot forward, sideways or backward, while the Silver Surfer continues to fire forward.

There are two other kinds of power-ups: collecting squares with an "F" can make shots gradually stronger to make the shots look like fire pellets. Up to five can be collected before they give bonus points instead. Collecting squares with a "B" will stock screen-clearing bombs, used by pressing the Select button; every life starts with one of these in stock.

When a life is lost, all spheres, firepower, and extra bombs are lost and must be re-obtained.

== Reception ==
Reception

Review score
Publication	Score
Electronic Gaming Monthly	7/10, 7/10, 6/10, 7/10

While enthusiastic about the Silver Surfer's presentation, GamePro also noted its difficulty: "You'll battle seemingly endless waves of tanks, monsters, mutants, ghosts, bats, and robots." A review in Nintendo Power echoed this, stating that it was a "fun and challenging action game", that "can be frustrating. [The Silver Surfer] does grow stronger as you play, though."

The reviewers in Electronic Gaming Monthly (EGM) overall comments on the game ranged from it faring "better than most in the genre" to it being a "slightly above average shooter" and "nothing really new and innovative, just a good solid shooter."

Two EGM reviewers complimented the score, with one saying it had "the coolest tunes to comes from a NES game in some time", while another added that "the rad tunes wear thin rather quickly". IGN and Games Radar found the game's music to be highly accomplished.
