= Annihilus =

Marvel Comics fictional character

- Annihilus as depicted in Annihilation #1 (October 2006). Art by Gabriele Dell'Otto.

Publication information
- Publisher: Marvel Comics
- First appearance: Fantastic Four Annual #6 (November 1968)
- Created by: Stan Lee; Jack Kirby

In-story information
- Species: Arthrosian
- Place of origin: The planet Arthros, in Sector 17A of the Negative Zone
- Team affiliations: Annihilation Wave
- Partnerships: Blastaar
- Notable aliases: Lord of the Negative Zone, the Living Death that Walks, Ahmyor
- Abilities: Superhuman strength, speed, stamina, agility and reflexes Chitinous exoskeleton grants increased durability Flight; Wields Cosmic Control Rod: Molecular manipulation; Energy blasts; Slowed aging process

Annihilus (/əˈnaɪ.ələs/) is a supervillain appearing in American comic books published by Marvel Comics, primarily as an adversary to the Fantastic Four. The character debuted in Fantastic Four Annual #6, which was published in November 1968. Annihilus was created by writer Stan Lee and artist Jack Kirby, and was notably featured in the "Annihilation" event.

Annihilus has at various times been the ruler of the Negative Zone, controlling its inhabitants via his powerful Cosmic Control Rod. He first encountered the Fantastic Four after Reed Richards discovered how to travel to the Negative Zone from Earth. Over the years he clashed with the Fantastic Four on many occasions, often with the group foiling his plans to invade Earth. He is often the partner of Blastaar, who started out as a rival to Annihilus' rule of the Negative Zone before becoming an ally.

Annihilus has appeared in a number of Marvel media, including several Fantastic Four shows, as well as The Super Hero Squad Show, The Avengers: Earth's Mightiest Heroes, Hulk and the Agents of S.M.A.S.H. and Ultimate Spider-Man. In 2009, Annihilus was ranked as IGN's 94th Greatest Comic Book Villain of All Time.

== Publication history ==
Annihilus was created by writer Stan Lee and artists Jack Kirby and Joe Sinnott. He first appeared in "Let There Be Life!", published in Fantastic Four Annual #6 (cover dated August 1968). Lee gave the issue the subtitle "The Glory of Birth, 'neath the Shadow of Death," pairing the birth of Franklin Richards with Annihilus, who symbolized death. The story shows Mister Fantastic, Thing, and Human Torch entering the Negative Zone to find a cosmic-energy source that would serve as a cure for the complications from Invisible Girl's pregnancy. Annihilus' Cosmic Control Rod turns out to be the only source of the needed energy. On the cover of the issue, Annihilus is colored green with red eyes, while his interior appearance uses a purple, pink, and green costume with a yellow Cosmic Control Rod.

Annihilus appeared again in Avengers #97 (March 1972), illustrated by John Buscema and Tom Palmer. Writer Gerry Conway and artist John Buscema established his origin story in Fantastic Four #140–141 (Nov.–Dec. 1973).

He played a small role in the Kree–Skrull War issues of Avengers, #89, 96–97. Other appearances include The Avengers #233, Marvel Team-Up #2, Marvel Two-in-One #75, and Thor #404–405, #434–435.

The character was the main antagonist in Annihilation, appearing in the prologue, the second issue of the Silver Surfer mini-series, and all six issues of the main title. He was killed in issue six, but has since been reborn. He appeared as an infant in War of Kings: Ascension #2.

== Fictional character biography ==
The first appearance of Annihilus. Cover to Fantastic Four Annual #6. Art by Jack Kirby

Annihilus first encounters the Fantastic Four when they enter the Negative Zone seeking anti-particles needed to treat Sue Storm's cosmic ray-related pregnancy complications. Annihilus's minions capture the heroes, but they escape, stealing his Cosmic Control Rod. They return the Rod after siphoning off the needed anti-particles and return to Earth.

Annihilus is challenged by a research scientist, Janus the Nega-Man, who develops a module capable of harnessing antimatter energy. Annihilus defeats Janus, forcing the Nega-Man to lead him to Earth, but Janus is instead seemingly killed in the exploding atmosphere where matter meets antimatter. Annihilus nearly crosses over to Earth through one of Mister Fantastic's portals, but is driven back by the Avengers. Annihilus battles the Frightful Four, and once again attempts to escape the Negative Zone, but is foiled by Spider-Man and the Human Torch.

Annihilus begins leading the Annihilation Wave, an enormous fleet of Negative Zone battleships, ostensibly claiming to have the goal of conquering the universe. He claims that the universe is expanding into areas of the Negative Zone, making the universe now rightfully his territory. In reality, Annihilus intends to create a massive Power Cosmic bomb that will destroy the universe and the Negative Zone, leaving him the only survivor. Drax and the Silver Surfer manage to free Galactus, who destroys the Annihilation Wave. Nova battles and kills Annihilus, who is reborn as an infant while retaining his memories. Annihilus is placed under the care of Catastrophus, a lord of the Negative Zone who uses the Cosmic Control Rod to stunt Annihilus' growth.

The Human Torch dies stopping a horde of aliens from the Negative Zone. Annihilus uses regenerative surgery to revive the Human Torch and forces him to work as a gladiator when he refuses to reopen the portal from the Negative Zone.

It is later revealed that Annihilus is still trapped in a child form, and has been using a mechanized stand-in for public appearances. Seeking to return to a more impressive size, he has his agents arrange the abduction of Bruce Banner. After his scientists study Banner's physiology and learn what allows him to transform into the Hulk, Annihilus is mutated into a gigantic, more monstrous form. With this new form, Annihilus and his army make another attempt to conquer the universe. They are successful, ravaging many worlds and killing most of Earth's heroes. However, Thanos and Adam Warlock travel back in time and prevent Annihilus' invasion from ever occurring. Warlock devolves Annihilus into a primitive insect, which Thanos steps on.

Annihilus, now back to a more standard form, later begins kidnapping and enslaving shipwreck survivors on a desolate world. Using the Nega-Bands to open a portal out of the Negative Zone, Annihilus plots to destroy Earth and the rest of the universe by using a powerful energy cannon. However, he is thwarted by the All-New, All-Different Avengers, who steal the Nega-Bands and destroy the weapon.

In the storyline "Annihilation - Scourge", the Negative Zone is attacked by forces from the Cancerverse, collectively known as the Scourge and led by the Void. Annihilus and Blastaar work together to fight the Scourge. The Silver Surfer reunites the Void with his other half, Sentry, while Nova sacrifices himself to stop the Scourge. However, he is resurrected by Annihilus soon after.

== Powers and abilities ==
Annihilus is capable of self-propelled flight and can withstand the vacuum of space. He possesses an insectoid exoskeleton with armored components that grants him resistance to most forms of injury. He has superhuman physical abilities. He is able to breathe in the vacuum of empty space, and can fly at speeds of up to 150 miles per hour. Annihilus wields the Cosmic Control Rod, which slows his aging process and enables him to manipulate energy and matter.

Annihilus also leads an elite personal guard, the Centurions, who have occasionally wielded portions of the Cosmic Control Rod's power.

Annihilus can continuously resurrect himself if he is killed.

== Reception ==
- In 2018, CBR.com ranked Ahmyor 12th in their "Age Of Apocalypse: The 30 Strongest Characters In Marvel's Coolest Alternate World" list.
- In 2022, GamesRadar+ ranked Annihilus third in their "Best Fantastic Four Villains" list.

== Other versions ==
=== Age of Apocalypse ===
An alternate universe version of Annihilus from Earth-295 appears in Age of Apocalypse. This version is a member of a resistance against Blastaar who was previously rendered amnesiac, assumed a humanoid form, and took the identity of Ahmyor. While fighting Blastaar alongside Blink, Annihilus regains his memories and returns to his original form. Annihilus begs Blink to leave the Negative Zone, as he is no longer the man she loved.

=== Heroes Reborn (2021) ===
An alternate universe version of Annihilus from Earth-21798 appears in Heroes Reborn. This version is the leader of the Bottled Hive of Annihilation, a race of small but powerful insects from the Negative Zone.

=== Mangaverse ===
An alternate universe version of Annihilus from Earth-2301 appears in Marvel Mangaverse: Fantastic Four #1. This version is a kaiju-like monster.

=== Ultimate Marvel ===
Nihil, a character from Earth-1610 inspired by Annihilus, appears in Ultimate Fantastic Four. He is the ruler of a space station composed of the remains of alien spaceships that orbits a dying red dwarf star. After learning of the Ultimate Universe, Nihil attempts to travel to it to escape the Negative Zone's decay, only to be killed by the Fantastic Four.

== In other media ==
=== Television ===
Annihilus (bottom right) as depicted in Spider-Man and His Amazing Friends.

- An illusionary Annihilus makes a cameo appearance in the Spider-Man and His Amazing Friends episode "The Prison Plot".
- Annihilus appears in the Fantastic Four (1994) episode "Behold the Negative Zone", voiced by Clyde Kusatsu.
- Annihilus appears in Fantastic Four: World's Greatest Heroes, voiced by Scott McNeil.
- Annihilus appears in The Super Hero Squad Show episode "Double Negation at the World's End!", voiced by Dee Bradley Baker.
- Annihilus appears in The Avengers: Earth's Mightiest Heroes episode "Assault on 42".
- Annihilus appears in Hulk and the Agents of S.M.A.S.H., voiced by Robin Atkin Downes.
- Annihilus appears in the Ultimate Spider-Man episode "Contest of Champions", voiced again by Robin Atkin Downes.

=== Video games ===
- Annihilus appears as a boss in Fantastic Four (2005), voiced by Lex Lang.
- Annihilus was originally intended to appear as a boss in Marvel: Ultimate Alliance, but was cut from the final release for unknown reasons.
- Annihilus appears in Marvel Super Hero Squad: The Infinity Gauntlet, voiced by Dee Bradley Baker.
- Annihilus appears in Marvel Super Hero Squad Online, voiced by Charlie Adler.
- Annihilus appears as an alternate skin for the Human Torch in Marvel: Avengers Alliance.
- Annihilus appears in Marvel Ultimate Alliance 3: The Black Order, voiced again by Robin Atkin Downes. He is available via the "Shadow of Doom" DLC.
- Annihilus appears in Marvel Contest of Champions.
- Annihilus appears in Marvel Snap.
- Annihilus appears in Marvel: Cosmic Invasion, voiced by Matthew Mercer.

=== Miscellaneous ===
Annihilus appears in Legendary: A Marvel Deck Building Game via the "Annihilation" expansion set.

=== Merchandise ===
- An Annihilus figure was released in series 3 of Toy Biz's Marvel Super Heroes action figure line.
- An Annihilus figure was released in series 3 of Toy Biz's Fantastic Four (1994) tie-in toy line.
- Annihilus served as a build-a-figure for the "Annihilus Series" of Hasbro's Marvel Legends line and a Wal-mart exclusive repaint.
- An Annihilus figure was released in series 5 of Hasbro's Marvel Super Hero Squad line.
- Annihilus was added to HeroClix in 2013 after winning a fan poll in 2012.

== See also ==
- List of Fantastic Four enemies
