= Silver Surfer (TV series) =

1998 American animated television series

- Genre: Superhero
- Based on: Silver Surfer by: Stan Lee; Jack Kirby
- Developed by: Larry Brody
- Directed by: Roy Allen Smith
- Voices of: Paul Essiembre; Camilla Scott; Colin Fox
- Composers: Shuki Levy; Kussa Mahchi; Deddy Tzur
- Countries of origin: United States; Canada
- No. of episodes: 13

Production
- Executive producers: Avi Arad; Stan Lee; Eric S. Rollman
- Producer: Roy Allen Smith
- Running time: 20 minutes
- Production companies: Marvel Entertainment Group; Marvel Studios; Saban Entertainment; AKOM

Original release
- Network: Fox (Fox Kids)
- Release: February 7 – May 16, 1998

Silver Surfer, also known as Silver Surfer: The Animated Series, is an animated television series based on the Marvel Comics superhero Silver Surfer, created by Stan Lee and Jack Kirby. It aired for one season on the Fox Kids Network in 1998.

== Overview ==
Blending cel-shaded and computer animation, the series is rendered in the style of Silver Surfer creator Jack Kirby.

Inspired by various Silver Surfer comic book stories, the series alters the original mythos in some key ways. It removes the Fantastic Four from The Galactus Trilogy, the foundation for the first three episodes. In this version, the Silver Surfer, who has had the memories of Norrin Radd partially restored to him by Thanos, protects Earth from the hunger of Galactus because it reminds him of his home planet of Zenn-La.

Many other characters from Marvel's cosmic stable appear in the series, including The Watcher, Ego the Living Planet, Pip the Troll, Drax the Destroyer, and Adam Warlock. Most of the characters featured in the series differ from their printed-page incarnations. For instance, Adam Warlock is an alien supersoldier designed to fight the Kree and, due to Fox broadcast standards, Thanos serves Lady Chaos rather than Death.

The series utilizes a serialized storytelling approach. As with many Silver Surfer comic book stories, episodes tackle a range of social and political issues, including imperialism, slavery, non-violence, and environmental degradation. The series frequently alludes to the Golden Age of Science Fiction, with two episode titles from novels by Isaac Asimov (Second Foundation and The End of Eternity), one from Joe Haldeman (The Forever War), and character names from Asimov (First Speaker) and Doc Smith (Mentor). The story for one episode was by Harlan Ellison.

The series was canceled after one season. Eight episodes were written for the second season before production was shut down. According to series creator Larry Brody, the cancellation was the result of a legal dispute between Marvel and Saban Entertainment.

== Voice cast ==
Titular character
Voice actor	Character
Paul Essiembre	Norrin Radd / Silver Surfer

Main recurring cast
Voice actor	Character
James Blendick	Galactus
Colin Fox	Uatu
Gary Krawford	Thanos
Camilla Scott	Shalla-Bal

Guest cast
Voice actor	Character
Denis Akiyama	Watcher Prime
Lawrence Bayne	Zedaro
Oliver Becker	Adam Warlock, Magus
Bernard Behrens	Nietr
Rick Bennent	Votrick
Robert Bockstael	Pip the Troll
Christopher Britton	Zarek
Valerie Buhagiar	Shellaine
Lally Cadeau	Lady Chaos
David Calderisi	Kiar
Michael Copeman	MacLag
Alyson Court	Amber
Jennifer Dale	Nebula
Len Doncheff	Raze
Shirley Douglas	The Universal Sourge
Don Francks	Kalek
Elizabeth Hanna	Kili the Troll
David Hemblen	Supreme Intelligence, Husseri
Howard Jerome	Geatar
Lorne Kennedy	Planetary Essence
Roy Lewis	Ego the Living Planet
Mary Long	Gamora (first appearance)
Tracey Moore	Tor-Kay
John Neville	Eternity
Nicole Oliver	Gamma Jen Beth
Karl Pruner	Beta Ray Bill
Tara Rosling	Frankie Raye / Nova
Elizabeth Sheperd	Infinity
Alison Sealy-Smith	Gamora (second appearance)
Cedric Smith	Mentor
Norm Spencer	Drax the Destroyer
John Stocker	Ivar
Marc Strange	Lord Glenn
Aron Tager	The Master of Zenn-La
Robert Tinkler	Borad

== Episodes ==
No.	Title	Written by	Original release date
1	"The Origin of the Silver Surfer"	Larry Brody	February 7, 1998
2	"The Origin of the Silver Surfer"	Larry Brody	February 14, 1998
3	"The Origin of the Silver Surfer"	Larry Brody	February 21, 1998
Just as the Watcher has warned, Galactus has arrived at Zenn-La to consume its energy. Norrin Radd sacrifices himself by offering to serve as Galactus' herald, whose job it will be to scout out planets without intelligent life so that Galactus will not destroy any civilizations. On the upside, Galactus gives Norrin a portion of his powers, turning him into the Silver Surfer. On the downside, the transference of powers remove Norrin's memories and his moral convictions. With no memories, the Silver Surfer finds world after world for Galactus to devour, but the herald is troubled by the destruction. The evil Thanos uses Ego the Living Planet to invade the Surfer's mind, intent on finding the secrets of Galactus within. The resulting mental battle unleashes the Surfer's memories and he goes to confront Galactus. When Galactus decides to attack Earth, the Surfer rebels, attacking the world-eater. Despite not being able to harm Galactus, the Surfer is allowed to return to Zenn-La. However, he eventually discovers that the planet has been moved, and he is now alone in space. The Surfer vows to find Zenn-La, and his beloved Shalla Bal.
4	"The Planet of Dr. Moreau"	Larry Brody, Chris Kane	February 28, 1998
The Surfer searches to find a Kree colony, where a Zenn-La scholar is rumored to be living. Surfer is enslaved by the Kree, and forced to work alongside genetically-engineered creatures known as "Trolls." Teaming up with Pip the Troll, and Pip's girlfriend, Kili, the Surfer leads a revolt against the Kree slavers.
5	"Learning Curve"	Larry Brody & Andrea Lawrence	March 7, 1998
6	"Learning Curve"	Larry Brody	March 14, 1998
The Surfer and Pip join Mentor and his servant, Drax the Destroyer, as they search for the mythical Universal Library of the Watchers. Mentor hopes to stop his mad brother, Thanos, from taking over the universe. The Surfer wants only to find Zenn-La. Plus, Eternity and Infinity have a grave warning for the Watcher. The Universal Library is overrun with large viral globs, and when Mentor interfaces with the "Index" they discover how Uatu came to be the last of the Watchers. The Silver Surfer, Drax, and Pip leave the planet; but Mentor is left behind.
7	"Innervisions"	Larry Brody, Alan Swayze	April 4, 1998
The Surfer finds a series of planets that have been devastated by Thanos, and Surfer rushes to warn the next planet in Thanos' target. It is a planet known as Harmony, and Surfer was on his way there to learn of Zenn-La by use of a gift his people gave to the planet; but the people of Harmony used the gift to live in a perpetual dream. Unaware of their impending doom at the hands of Thanos. Surfer enters the dream and convinces one of their heroes, Beta Ray Bill, to help defeat Thanos. But how can they do that when all Thanos really wants is the love and approval of Lady Chaos?
8	"Antibody"	Larry Brody, Michael Steven Gregory story by Harlan Ellison	April 11, 1998
Galactus is dying, and his new herald, Nova, enlists the Surfer's aid to help save his life. Surfer and Galactus strike a deal. He would help Galactus if in return, Galactus gives him information about Zenn-La. Galactus agrees and allows the Surfer to enter his body in order to destroy the scourge that is killing him, while Nova remains on the outside, defending Galactus from attacking Wanderer ships. Surfer learns that Galactus knows nothing about Zenn-La's location because, in his anger, he hurled the planet so far away, even he knows not where it came to rest.
9	"Second Foundation"	Larry Brody, Michael Steven Gregory	April 25, 1998
Nova is torn between her duties for Galactus and her loyalty to the Silver Surfer. After finding a young planet filled with the energy Galactus needs to survive, she helps the Surfer try to find Zenn-La. They end up on the ancient Skrull homeworld, where they become fighters in a Skrull revolution that is tearing apart the world of the shape-changers. Their duty is to protect the royal egg which is to become the next hive mother of the Skrull.
10	"Radical Justice"	Larry Brody, Brooks Wachtel	May 2, 1998
The Surfer is captured by Lord Glenn and the Wanderers and put on trial for the crimes of Galactus. The Surfer is stripped of his powers and turns back into Norrin Radd. As he fights for his survival on a planetoid filled with robotic traps, the twin stars near the planetoid begin to collapse and form a black hole. Norrin Radd must regain his powers as the Silver Surfer in order to save those that have condemned him to death.
11	"The Forever War"	Larry Brody, Mark Hoffmeier	May 29, 1998
The Surfer asks the Kree's Supreme Intelligence to help him find Zenn-La, but before they give him an audience with the Supremor, he must do something for them. While on his task, he is swallowed by a spatial anomaly where Adam Warlock is in a never-ending battle with the Kree. The Surfer frees Warlock from the battle, and both of them return to the Kree Home World. There they discover that the Supremor has evil plans for Warlock. The two heroes escape, and Warlock learns about the destruction of his people. Though the Surfer asks Warlock to join him, Adam Warlock chooses to return to the anomaly where he can fight his "forever war", forget, and live on in honor.
12	"Return to Zenn-La"	Larry Brody	May 9, 1998
The Surfer finally finds Zenn-La, and is reunited with his beloved Shalla Bal. But things seem different, and the behavior of Shalla Bal gets increasingly strange and dangerous. The Surfer soon discovers that he has not found his home at all; instead he has once again found Ego, the Living Planet, who intends to repay his debt to the Surfer.
13	"The End of Eternity"	Larry Brody, Dallas Barnes	May 16, 1998
The Surfer is summoned by Eternity and Infinity, and is warned that Thanos has found a way to make time flow backwards, thus bringing about the end of the universe. As the Surfer rushes to stop Thanos, the universe begins to contract around him. When it appears as if the Surfer dies in his battle with Thanos, Eternity and Infinity wonder if all has been lost.

== Home media ==
In the UK the complete series on two discs were to be released by Liberation Entertainment on July 28, 2008; however, because of the closure of the UK division of Liberation Entertainment, the release was cancelled. The rights were then acquired by Clear Vision LTD who released the set on May 11, 2009.

As with most of the Marvel Films Animation and New World Animation libraries, the rights to this show are currently owned by Disney Enterprises, through BVS Entertainment and Jetix who acquired the Fox Kids Worldwide franchise and the kids’ entertainment programming properties of Saban Entertainment and Fox Children's Productions in 2001 and also, Marvel Animation, which Disney acquired Marvel Entertainment in 2009. However, there are no plans to release the series on Region 1 DVD in its entirety.

In September 2019, it was announced that the complete series would be streaming on Disney+.

== Intro theme ==
The intro theme was produced and credited by Saban Entertainment and Shuki Levy. The music and lyrics were made by Deddy Tzur and co-written by Phil Steele.
