= Galactus =

Marvel Comics fictional character

- Galactus on the variant cover of The Amazing Spider-Man (vol. 5) #12 (December 2018). Art by Adi Granov.

Publication information
- Publisher: Marvel Comics
- First appearance: Fantastic Four #48 (March 1966)
- Created by: Stan Lee (writer); Jack Kirby (artist)

In-story information
- Alter ego: Galan
- Species: Taa-an
- Place of origin: Galan: Taa; Galactus: the Cosmic Egg
- Team affiliations: Heralds of Galactus; God Squad; Ultimates
- Partnerships: Taaia (mother) Heralds of Galactus: Air-Walker; Dazzler; Destroyer; Doctor Strange; Fallen One; Firelord; Gah Lak Tus; Golden Oldie; Invisible Boy; Ka-Zar; Morg the Executioner; Nova II (Frankie Raye); Praeter; Rom the Space Knight; Red Shift; Silver Surfer; Stardust; Terrax the Tamer; Thor Odinson; Ultimates
- Notable aliases: Ashta, the Devourer of Worlds, the Lifebringer, the Seeder of Worlds
- Abilities: Mastery of the Power Cosmic

Galactus (/ɡəˈlæktəs/) is a fictional character appearing in American comic books published by Marvel Comics. Formerly a mortal man, he is a cosmic entity who consumes planets to sustain his life force, and serves a functional role in the upkeep of the primary Marvel continuity. He was created by Stan Lee and Jack Kirby and first appeared in Fantastic Four #48 (March 1966). Lee and Kirby wanted to introduce a character that broke from the archetype of the standard villain. In the character's first appearance, Galactus was depicted as a god-like figure that fed by draining living planets of their energy, and operated without regard to the morality or judgments of mortal beings.

Galactus's initial origin was that of a Taa-an space explorer named Galan who gained cosmic abilities by passing near a star, but writer Mark Gruenwald further developed the character's origins, presenting Taa and Galan as existing in the universe prior to the Big Bang that began the setting of the current universe. As Galan's universe came to an end, he merged with the "Sentience of the Universe" to become Galactus, an entity who must consume planets to sustain his existence. Additional material written by John Byrne, Jim Starlin, and Louise Simonson explored Galactus's role and purpose in the Marvel Universe, and examined the character's actions through themes of genocide, manifest destiny, ethics, and natural/necessary existence. Frequently accompanied by a herald (such as the Silver Surfer), the character has appeared as both antagonist and protagonist in central and supporting roles. He is depicted as the son of Taaia and the father of Gali / Galacta. Since debuting in the Silver Age of Comic Books, Galactus has played a role in over five decades of Marvel continuity. In 2009, Galactus ranked fifth on IGN's list of "Top 100 Comic Book Villains", which cited the character's "larger-than-life presence" as making him one of the more important villains ever created. IGN also noted "Galactus is one of the few villains on our list to really defy the definition of an evil-doer" as the character is compelled to destroy worlds because of his hunger, rather than out of malicious ends.

The character has been featured in other Marvel media, such as arcade games, video games, animated television series, the 2007 film Fantastic Four: Rise of the Silver Surfer, and the 2025 Marvel Cinematic Universe (MCU) film The Fantastic Four: First Steps, portrayed by Ralph Ineson.

== Publication history ==
Created by writer-editor Stan Lee and artist-coplotter Jack Kirby, the character debuted in The Fantastic Four #48 (cover dated March 1966, the first of a three-issue story later known as "The Galactus Trilogy").

=== Origin ===
In 1966, just a few years after launching Marvel Comics' flagship superhero title Fantastic Four, creators Stan Lee and Jack Kirby collaborated on an antagonist designed to break the supervillain mold of the time and instead be a being with god-like stature and power. As Lee recalled in 1993,

Galactus was simply another in a long line of super-villains whom we loved creating. ...[W]e felt the only way to top ourselves was to come up with an evil-doer who had almost godlike powers. Therefore, the natural choice was sort of a demi-god, but now what would we do with him? We didn't want to use the tired old cliche about him wanting to conquer the world. There were enough would-be world conquerors in the Marvel Universe and in all the other comic book galaxies. That was when inspiration struck. Why not have him not be a really evil person? After all, a demi-god should be beyond mere good and evil. He'd just be (don't laugh!) hungry. And the nourishment he'd require is the life force and energy from living planets!

Kirby described his biblical inspirations for Galactus and an accompanying character, an angelic herald Lee called the Silver Surfer:

My inspirations were the fact that I had to make sales and come up with characters that were no longer stereotypes. In other words, I couldn't depend on gangsters. I had to get something new. For some reason, I went to the Bible and I came up with Galactus. And there I was in front of this tremendous figure, who I knew very well because I've always felt him. I certainly couldn't treat him in the same way I could any ordinary mortal. And I remember in my first story, I had to back away from him to resolve that story. The Silver Surfer is, of course, the fallen angel. When Galactus relegated him to Earth, he stayed on Earth, and that was the beginning of his adventures. They were figures that had never been used before in comics. They were above mythic figures. And of course they were the first gods.

Kirby elaborated, "Galactus in actuality is a sort of god. He is beyond reproach, beyond anyone's opinion. In a way he is kind of a Zeus, who fathered Hercules. He is his own legend, and of course, he and the Silver Surfer are sort of modern legends, and they are designed that way."

Writer Mike Conroy expanded on Lee and Kirby's explanations: "In five short years from the launch of the Fantastic Four, the Lee/Kirby duo ... had introduced a whole host of alien races or their representatives ... there were the Skrulls, the Watcher and the Stranger, all of whom Lee and Kirby used in the foundations of the universe they were constructing, one where all things were possible but only if they did not flout the 'natural laws' of this cosmology. In the nascent Marvel Universe, characters acted consistently, whatever comic they were appearing in. Their actions reverberated through every title. It was pure soap opera but on a cosmic scale, and Galactus epitomized its epic sweep."

This led to the introduction of Galactus in Fantastic Four #48–50 (March–May 1966), which fans began calling "The Galactus Trilogy". Kirby did not intend Galactus to reappear, to preserve the character's awe-inspiring presence. Fan popularity, however, prompted Lee to ask Kirby for Galactus' reappearance, and the character became a mainstay of the Marvel Universe.

=== 1960s ===
To preserve the character's mystique, his next two appearances were nonspeaking cameos in Thor #134 (November 1966), and Daredevil #37 (February 1968), respectively. Numerous requests from fans prompted the character to be featured heavily in Fantastic Four #74–77 (May–August 1968). After a flashback appearance in Silver Surfer #1 (August 1968), the character returned to Earth in Thor #160–162 (January–March 1969). Galactus' origin was eventually revealed in Thor #168–169 (September–October 1969).

=== 1970s and 1980s ===
The character made appearances in Fantastic Four #120–123 (March–June 1972) and Thor #225–228 (July–October 1974). These two storylines introduced two new heralds for Galactus. Galactus also featured in Fantastic Four #172–175 (July–October 1976) and 208–213 (July–December 1979).

Stan Lee and Jack Kirby reunited for the origin of the Silver Surfer and Galactus in the one-shot graphic novel The Silver Surfer: The Ultimate Cosmic Experience! in 1978. This Marvel Fireside Book, published by Simon & Schuster, was an out-of-continuity retelling of the origin story without the Fantastic Four.

The full Lee-and-Kirby origin story was reprinted in the one-shot Super-Villain Classics #1: Galactus – The Origin (May 1983), inked by Vince Colletta and George Klein, lettered by John Morelli and colored by Andy Yanchus. While nearly identical to the previous origin, this story featured supplemental material, edits, and deletions by writer Mark Gruenwald, pencillers John Byrne and Ron Wilson and inker Jack Abel. Rather than traveling into a dying star, the character enters the core of the collapsing universe before the Big Bang; the story was later reprinted as Origin of Galactus #1 (February 1996).

The character guest-starred in Rom #26–27 (January–February 1982). Galactus featured in two related storylines in Fantastic Four #242–244 (May–July 1982) and later #257 (August 1983), in which writer-artist John Byrne introduced the conceit of Galactus feeling remorse for his actions, and the weight of his genocides. In the issue, Death assures Galactus of his role and purpose as one of shepherd and weeder in guiding the universe to its proper purpose, and Galactus remains resolute. Byrne further elaborated on this concept in Fantastic Four #262 (January 1984), which sparked controversy. At the end of the story, Eternity, an abstract entity in the Marvel Universe, appears to validate the existence of Galactus as necessary for the natural order and essential to prevent an even more catastrophic fate; Howard University professor of literature Marc Singer criticized this, accusing the writer-artist of using the character to "justify planetary-scale genocide." Byrne and Stan Lee also collaborated on a one-shot Silver Surfer story (June 1982) in which Galactus returned to Zenn-La after the Surfer's rebellion and drained it of energy after allowing the populace to flee.

Writer-penciller John Byrne and inker Terry Austin produced "The Last Galactus Story" as a serial in the anthology comic-magazine Epic Illustrated #26–34 (October 1984 – February 1986). Nine of a scheduled 10 installments appeared. Each was six pages with the exception of the eighth installment (12 pages). The magazine was cancelled with issue #34, leaving the last chapter unpublished and the story unfinished; however, Byrne later published the conclusion on his website. Galactus played a pivotal role in the limited series Secret Wars #1–12 (May 1984 – April 1985), and became a recurring character in Silver Surfer (vol. 3) (beginning with issue #1 (July 1987)).

Stan Lee and artist John Buscema also produced the 64-page hardcover graphic novel Silver Surfer: Judgment Day (October 1988), in which Galactus clashes with the demonic entity Mephisto.

=== 1990s ===
Galactus was featured in the miniseries The Infinity Gauntlet #1–6 (July –December 1991), The Infinity War #1–6 (June –November 1992) and Cosmic Powers #1–6 (March –August 1994). The character starred in the six-issue miniseries Galactus the Devourer (September 1999 –March 2000), written by Louise Simonson and illustrated by John Buscema, which climaxed with Galactus' death. Simonson originally conceived that the story arc would occur in Silver Surfer (vol. 3), but the title was cancelled due to dwindling sales. She proposed a separate limited series, and at the time was initially doubtful that Marvel would approve what she considered a "radical" idea concerning "why the very existence of the universe depends on the health and well-being of Galactus."

=== 2000s ===
The consequences of Galactus' death are explored in the issues Fantastic Four Annual 2001 and Fantastic Four (vol. 3) #46–49 (October 2001 – January 2002) written by Jeph Loeb and culminate in Galactus' revival, bringing resolution to Simonson's cliffhanger from the Devourer story arc. The character features in the first six issues of the limited series Thanos (December 2003 – May 2004), written by Jim Starlin. Issues #7–12 (June–November 2004), written by Keith Giffen, introduce the Fallen One, who is retroactively presented as Galactus' first herald.

Galactus' origin is re-examined in Fantastic Four #520–523 (October 2004 – April 2005), in which the character is temporarily reverted to his mortal form. After appearing in the limited series Stormbreaker: The Saga of Beta Ray Bill #1–6 (March–August 2005) Galactus was a central character in the "Annihilation" storyline, appearing in the limited series Annihilation: Silver Surfer #1–4 (June–September 2006), Annihilation #1–6 (October 2006 – March 2007) and the epilogue, Annihilation: Heralds of Galactus #1–2 (February–April 2007).

Galactus was an antagonist in Fantastic Four #545–546 (June–July 2007), where he tried to devour fellow cosmic function Epoch. In Nova (vol. 4) #13–15 (May–July 2008), the character had no dialogue. Author Andy Lanning said that he and co-writer Dan Abnett were "treating Galactus like a force of nature; an inevitable, planetary catastrophe that there is no reasoning with, no bargaining with and no escaping." Galactus also appeared in the limited series Beta Ray Bill: Godhunter #1–3 (June–August 2009), a sequel to Stormbreaker: The Saga of Beta Ray Bill #1–6.

=== 2010s ===
Galactus and the Silver Surfer appeared as antagonists in both Skaar: Son of Hulk #7–12 (March 1, 2009 – August 1, 2009) and Son of Hulk #13–17 (September 1, 2009 – January 2010), and as protagonists in the miniseries The Thanos Imperative #1–6 (June–November 2010). Galactus was a member of the God Squad in the miniseries Chaos War #2–5 (December 2010 – March 2011). After an appearance in Fantastic Four #583–587 (November 2010 – March 2011), the character returned to Earth in Silver Surfer (vol. 6) #1–5 (January–May 2011) and was the antagonist in The Mighty Thor #1–6 (April–September 2011). Galactus played a supporting role in the storyline "Forever" featured in Fantastic Four #600–604 (November 2011 – March 2012) and FF #16 (March 2012) by Johnathan Hickman, where Hickman introduced the concept of a shared destiny between Galactus and Franklin Richards. Writer Mark Waid would subsequently develop this concept further (see below).

The character played a central role as antagonist in Hunger #1–4 (2013), in which the mainstream Galactus of the primary Marvel continuity merges with his counterpart from the Ultimate Marvel publication imprint, Gah Lak Tus. Writer Joshua Hale Fialkov commented that his intent was to use Galactus as a means to place the characters from the Ultimate Marvel imprint into a completely unexpected crisis: "What I hope comes across is the sense of wonder that's being brought into the Ultimate Universe...with the smart, modern tone Brian has established."

Following his appearance in Hunger, Galactus was a major supporting character in The Ultimates (vol. 2) #1–6 (January–June 2016), where writer Al Ewing fundamentally changed the nature of Galactus' character. During the events of the story, Galactus is transformed into "the Lifebringer", a being who is compelled to infuse dead planets with life-sustaining energies, thus altering the character's primary motive for the first time since Galactus' debut in 1966. Elaborating on what inspired the change, Ewing explained "What inspired it—a mixture of wanting someone big on or allied with the team—originally, we thought about Odin, but he's a bit busy—and my usual preoccupations with atonement, redemption, growth and change. So what can [Galactus] do now? Well, whereas before he was taking in vast amounts of energy, now he's putting out vast amounts of energy—pure life energy. He always said he was going to give back more than he took out of the universe—now he's making good on that, one dead world at a time." The themes of redemption and change were received well by columnist Mark Peters, who described Ewing's work on Ultimates as "one of the best Galactus stories ever."

Galactus featured prominently in a direct sequel series to The Ultimates (vol. 2) #1–6 titled The Ultimates 2 (vol. 2) #1–10 (November 2016 – August 2017) which focused on the Lifebringer Galactus as the de facto leader of the Ultimates. Galactus in his Lifebringer persona made his final appearance in Moon Girl and Devil Dinosaur #26–30 (December 2017 – April 2018) before being reverted to his "Devourer of Worlds" persona by writer Gerry Duggan in Infinity Countdown #4 (June 2018).

Set at the end of the primary Marvel continuity, the miniseries History of the Marvel Universe #1–6 (July 2019 – December 2019) by Mark Waid depicted Galactus as the in-story narrator. The story features Galactus recounting all the major events that have occurred in Marvel continuity to Franklin Richards as the universe experiences its final moments. Confirming the series as occurring within the primary Marvel continuity, Waid elaborated that "[t]here is a framing device, yes. We wanted it to be a story, not just a long Wikipedia entry. As established in Jonathan Hickman's Fantastic Four run, there comes a point when Galactus and Franklin Richards stand together at the end of time, and now we get to see exactly what they were doing there."

=== 2020s ===
Galactus was killed by Thor during the "Herald of Thunder" story arc in Thor (vol. 6) #1–6 (March–August 2020). Galactus reappeared after a two-year hiatus in Fantastic Four (vol. 6) #45 (July 2022)—the final issue of the event "Reckoning War"—where he is resurrected by his former heralds.

== Fictional character biography ==
Galan of Taa, and the Sentience of the previous universe in the Cosmic egg, which will eventually produce Galactus. Super-Villain Classics #1: Galactus – The Origin (May 1983), art by Jack Kirby and John Byrne

Reality goes through cycles of creation and destruction. Galactus was originally the Taa-an explorer Galan of the planet Taa in the previous iteration of the multiverse, the Sixth Cosmos, which existed before the Big Bang of the current multiverse, the Seventh Cosmos. When an unknown cosmic cataclysm gradually kills all other life in his universe, Galan and other survivors leave Taa on a spacecraft and are engulfed in the Big Crunch. Galan, however, does not die: after bonding with the Sentience of the Universe, he changes and gestates for billions of years in an egg made of the debris of his ship that the current universe formed after the Big Bang. He emerges as Galactus, and although a Watcher named Ecce observed Galactus's birth and recognizes his destructive nature, the Watcher chooses not to kill Galactus. Starving for sustenance, Galactus consumes the nearby planet of Archeopia—the first of many planets he would destroy to maintain his existence. Subsequently, in memory of his dead homeworld of Taa and the first planet (Archeopia) to fall prey to his hunger, Galactus constructs a new "homeworld": the Möbius strip-shaped space station called Taa II.

Galactus becomes involved in a civil war among the "Proemial Gods", who had come into being during the universe's infancy. When a faction of the gods led by Diableri of Chaos attempts to remake the universe in their own image, Galactus kills Diableri and imprisons three others (Antiphon, Tenebrous, and Aegis) in the prison called the Kyln.

Galactus then creates the being Tyrant out of a desire for companionship, but the two ultimately engage in a major conflict. Galactus decides to empower his first herald—the Fallen One—who ultimately rebels against his master. When approaching the planet of Zenn-La, Galactus accepts the offer of Norrin Radd to become his herald, the Silver Surfer, in exchange for sparing his world. Eventually locating Earth, Galactus is driven off by the Fantastic Four, Uatu the Watcher, and the rebellious Silver Surfer after the Human Torch—with the Watcher's assistance—retrieves the Ultimate Nullifier from Taa II. Although Galactus leaves Earth, vowing that he will never try to consume it again, he banishes the Surfer to Earth for betraying him. Galactus later returns for his former herald, but the Surfer is unrepentant and chooses to remain on Earth. Thor learns of Galactus' origin when the entity comes into conflict with Ego the Living Planet.

Returning to Earth, Galactus unsuccessfully tries to re-enlist the Silver Surfer. After the Fantastic Four and the Surfer defeat Galactus's new herald, the Air-Walker, Mister Fantastic reprograms Galactus's ship to travel to the Negative Zone, which contains many uninhabited worlds that could potentially be consumed. Thor and Hercules encounter Galactus when his next herald, Firelord, travels to Earth to be free of his master. Galactus frees Firelord when Thor presents Galactus with the magical Asgardian suit of armor named the Destroyer to animate and use as a herald.

Galactus comes into conflict with the High Evolutionary when attempting to devour Counter-Earth, but he is temporarily transformed into harmless energy after attempting to devour the planet Poppup, the homeworld of the Impossible Man. After returning to normal form, Galactus is sought by the Fantastic Four to help stop a new cosmic threat, the Sphinx. Mr. Fantastic offers to release Galactus from his vow to not devour Earth if he helps defeat the Sphinx. Galactus agrees, if the Fantastic Four first recruit a being called Tyros as a new herald. The quartet succeed, and the newly empowered and renamed Terrax leads his master to Earth. Galactus locates and defeats the Sphinx in Egypt, but is confronted by Mr. Fantastic, who, unbeknownst to Galactus, wields a fake Ultimate Nullifier. Unable to read Richards' mind (which is protected by the Watcher), Galactus retreats.

Galactus empowers and uses the superheroine Dazzler to locate a missing Terrax, who is in fact hiding from his master inside a black hole. The Dazzler defeats and retrieves Terrax, and forces Galactus to return her to Earth. Galactus is fooled by the Galadorian Spaceknight Rom into trying to devour the Black Nebula, the homeworld of the Dire Wraiths, but he is repelled by the Wraiths' Dark Sun. A weakened Galactus pursues the rebellious Terrax to Earth and strips him of his power. Near death, Galactus is saved by the Fantastic Four and the Avengers while also acquiring another herald: Nova (Frankie Raye), who offers herself as Galactus' herald in exchange for him sparing Earth again. Galactus devours the Skrulls' throneworld of Tarnax IV, and discusses his role in the universe with fellow cosmic entity Death. Mr. Fantastic is captured by the Shi'ar for saving Galactus' life, and is tried by all of the aliens who survived the annihilation of their homeworlds by Galactus. During the trial, the cosmic entity Eternity — the sentient embodiment of space and reality of the Marvel Universe — intervenes, allowing all beings present to momentarily become one with the universe, allowing them to understand that Galactus is a necessary part of the cosmic order.

During the Secret Wars, Galactus attempts to consume Battleworld to force the Beyonder to remove his hunger, but his plan is foiled by Doctor Doom. Galactus grants clemency to the Silver Surfer, who aids his former master against the Elders of the Universe and the In-Betweener. Galactus also rescues the Surfer and Nova from Mephisto's realm, and aids the cosmic hierarchy in a war against the mad Eternal Thanos, who wields the Infinity Gauntlet.

When Nova is conscience-stricken at causing the death of billions of aliens, Galactus takes on a new herald, the bloodthirsty Morg the Executioner. Tyrant eventually returns and Morg sacrifices himself to stop the former creation of Galactus by using the Ultimate Nullifier. Galactus then decides, with help from his new herald Red Shift, to only devour the energy of living beings, which brings him into conflict with alien races and Earth's superheroes. During a final confrontation near Chandilar, the throneworld of the Shi'ar, the Silver Surfer turns Galactus' siphoning machines against him. A starving Galactus dies and assumes the form of a star. The death of Galactus allows the entity Abraxas (a metaphysical embodiment of destruction) to emerge from imprisonment. The entity wreaks havoc across thousands of alternate universes, killing various incarnations of Galactus before the children of Mr. Fantastic — Franklin Richards and Valeria von Doom — exhaust their powers to restore the original Galactus. Galactus then provides Mr. Fantastic with the Ultimate Nullifier, which he uses to reset reality and prevent Abraxas' initial escape and destruction.

Conscience-stricken, Galactus tries to rid himself of his cosmic hunger by feeding on the power from the Infinity Gems, but is tricked into releasing the Hunger, a being which feeds on entire galaxies. The Hunger is destroyed when Thanos orchestrates a final battle with Galactus. When an alien race develops a technology to make planets invisible to Galactus, he empowers the Human Torch (who has traded powers with his sister the Invisible Woman and becomes the Invisible Boy as a result of this) and utilizes the hero as an unwilling herald to locate the planets. The Fantastic Four and Quasar free the Torch by changing Galactus back into the humanoid Galan, who chooses to exile himself to an energy-rich alternate dimension before he can transform back into Galactus so that he can feed on that reality without endangering planets.

Galactus consumes Beta Ray Bill's homeworld with the help of his new herald, Stardust. After Annihilus declares war on the universe, the entity attacks and destroys the Kyln, freeing former Galactus foes Tenebrous and Aegis. Sensing their release, Galactus temporarily releases Stardust from his service and re-employs the Silver Surfer as his herald due to his familiarity with their old foes. Tenebrous and Aegis, however, find and defeat the Surfer and Galactus and deliver them to Annihilus. Annihilus intends to use Galactus as a weapon to destroy all life in the universe, but is thwarted when the entity is freed by Drax the Destroyer. Galactus retaliates and destroys most of Annihilus' forces. Seeking a final confrontation with Tenebrous and Aegis, Galactus sends the Silver Surfer to locate them. The Surfer eventually draws the pair into the barrier between the universe and the Negative Zone, which destroys both of them.

After an encounter with Epoch, Galactus consumes the planet Orbucen. When a distraught Beta Ray Bill seeks vengeance for the destruction of the Korbinites' homeworld, Galactus relents and creates a female Korbinite as a companion for Bill. Galactus also consumes the planet Sakaar, earning the enmity of the Hulk's alien-born twin sons, Skaar and Hiro-Kala.

The Silver Surfer finds the body of a future Galactus underneath New York City, and he summons the present Galactus to Earth. Mr. Fantastic explains that, in the distant future, the heroes on a dying Earth had killed Galactus and then escaped to the present via time travel. When Galactus discovers these heroes now live on a planet called Nu-Earth, he destroys it and its inhabitants in retribution.

A tear in the fabric of space caused by the Annihilation Wave and other interstellar conflicts allows the extra-universal forces of the Cancerverse (an alternate universe without death) to invade. Galactus, the Celestials and the resurrected Tenebrous and Aegis combat the powerful Cancerverse weapon: the Galactus Engine (constructed from the corpse of the Cancerverse's counterpart to Galactus). During the events of the Chaos War, Galactus is teleported to Earth by the Olympian demigod Hercules to help fight the Chaos King, a metaphysical embodiment of Oblivion and another antithesis of Eternity. While the Hulk and his allies the God Squad, Alpha Flight, and several members of the Avengers fight Amatsu-Mikaboshi's forces, Amadeus Cho and Galactus develop a machine which will move Earth to a safe location in a sealed-off continuum, only to adapt the plan by trapping Amatsu-Mikaboshi in that dimension instead.

After an encounter with the High Evolutionary, Galactus invades Asgard, home of the Norse gods, seeking an Asgardian artifact to sate his hunger and spare future civilizations. Odin, ruler of the Norse gods, contends that Galactus wishes to ensure that he is not replaced in the next universe. To avoid a protracted battle, the Silver Surfer offers to remain on Earth to guard the artifact on the condition that Galactus may have it once Asgard eventually passes. Galactus recruits a human preacher from Earth named Pastor Mike (full name unknown) that he names Praeter to be his new herald. Later, when the Mad Celestials from Earth-4280 invade, Galactus destroys one before being struck down by the others. Revived by Franklin Richards, he and Franklin succeed in vanquishing the remaining Celestials, and prevent the destruction of Earth. In the aftermath, Galactus learns that he will no longer face the eventual end of the universe alone; he and Franklin will witness it together.

Galactus is then pulled through a hole in space-time to an alternate universe and meets another version of himself: a space-faring mechanical hive mind called Gah Lak Tus. After the two merge with one another, Galactus makes his way towards this universe's Earth in an attempt to consume it. The heroes of the alternate Earth travel to Earth-616 to acquire information on Galactus and eventually manage to send Galactus to the Negative Zone, reasoning that he will eventually starve to death, as the region is composed of antimatter. A comatose Galactus is found by the Eternals and Aarkus, who hope to use him in their war against the Kree.

Galactus returns to the universe, and after an encounter with Squirrel Girl, is forced into his own incubator by the Ultimates, who are determined to end his threat. Galactus re-emerges as a Lifebringer instead of a Devourer of Worlds, his first act as such being to re-create Archeopia, the first planet that he ever consumed. Galactus later rescues the team at the behest of Eternity, and learns that the latter has been imprisoned by an unknown force. Galactus also comes into conflict with fellow cosmic entities Master Order and Lord Chaos, who, along with the Molecule Man, wish for Galactus to return to his former role as a Devourer of Worlds and thereby restore the cosmic order. Galactus locates the hero Anti-Man outside the multiverse and, after transforming him into a Herald of Life, sends him to recruit the recently disbanded Ultimates to help discover the identity of Eternity's captor, who is later revealed to be the First Firmament, the first iteration of the cosmos. Master Order and Lord Chaos bring Galactus to trial before the Living Tribunal, still seeking to restore Galactus to his former state for the sake of the cosmic order. Although Galactus successfully argues that the balance of the new Multiverse is different and that his old role is obsolete, the Tribunal is destroyed by a Firmament-influenced Master Order and Lord Chaos. After a brief battle, Master Order decides to create a new cosmic order, which it and Lord Chaos would control. Their former servant, the In-Betweener, is forcibly merged with them into a new cosmic being called Logos. After destroying several Celestials, Logos forcibly transforms Galactus back into the Devourer of Worlds. The process is reversed when Anti-Man sacrifices his life to restore Galactus as the Lifebringer. Galactus then swears to free the imprisoned Eternity.

During the "Infinity Countdown" storyline, the Silver Surfer requests Galactus' aid in defeating Ultron/Hank Pym by consuming the planet Saiph, which is overrun by Ultron drones. Galactus reluctantly agrees. After consuming Saiph, Galactus' hunger returns and the Silver Surfer becomes his herald again as he takes Galactus to find an uninhabited planet.

Returning to Earth, Galactus has a confrontation with Doctor Doom and the Fantastic Four, with Doom revealing his plans to harness Galactus' power as an energy source. Banished to the mystical realms by an alien sorcerer, Galactus becomes entangled in the schemes of Dormammu and Mephisto. Galactus begins to consume mystical energy, eventually absorbing Dormammu and other mystical entities, and in doing so goes insane and destabilizes reality. Doctor Strange intervenes and – with the aid of Eternity and the Living Tribunal – is able to undo the damage wrought by Galactus.

An injured Galactus crashlands on Asgard, apparently seeking asylum from the cause of his universe's destruction: the Black Winter (Fimbulwinter). Galactus reveals to All-Father Thor that he had a vision of Thor being responsible for his death. In a bid to destroy the Black Winter, Galactus turns Thor into his Herald of Thunder. Thor later learns that the Black Winter considers Galactus to be his herald. This causes an angered Thor to drain Galactus of his energies enough to turn him into a desiccated husk. When the Black Winter moves in to claim Galactus' body, Thor uses it as a bomb to decimate the Black Winter.

== Powers and abilities ==
Galactus was created during the union of the Sentience of the (previous) Universe and Galan of Taa, and is described as "the physical, metamorphosed embodiment of a cosmos." Although he is not an abstract entity, his true form cannot be perceived by most beings; each species sees Galactus in a form they can comprehend, similar to their race or a deity of their religion. Galactus can also appear as a humanoid star when addressing fellow members of the cosmic hierarchy. Through his actions of consuming planets, Galactus embodies a living force of nature whose existence acts as a third force to the conceptual entities: Eternity and Death, as well serving as a cosmic test of survival for civilizations. Additionally, the continued existence of Galactus ensures the confinement of the cosmic entity Abraxas. As Galactus requires planets with the potential to support life, his existence also causes the extinction of entire extraterrestrial civilizations.

Galactus' overall power level is variable, based on the planets he has recently consumed. If he does not feed regularly, he becomes considerably weaker; on one occasion, while in a starved, weakened state, he was defeated by the combined efforts of the Fantastic Four, Doctor Strange and the Avengers. On the other hand, if Galactus overfeeds on planets, he can greatly increase his powers, temporarily. After consuming four planets, Galactus increased his powers to the point that he could easily destroy a Mad Celestial, although he was still not powerful enough to take on three of them at once.

Galactus' upper limit is unknown. On a few occasions, storylines reached their climax at a point where Galactus lacks his customary restraint, and becomes insatiable. Writer Walt Simonson depicted a Galactus in a possible future whose hunger was altered by the Celestial Tiamut, with Galactus consuming the universe due to his rabid hunger. In the "Herald Supreme" storyline, Mark Waid showed Galactus' uncontrollable hunger that results from his consumption of the mystical being Dormammu. Jonathan Hickman and Sanford Greene wrote a story taking place in an alternate reality, where Galactus begins ravenously consuming as many planets as possible, and "overflowing with the power of hundreds of consumed planets," he crushes a Celestial Host.

The consumption of planets is what maintains Galactus' life and power. He usually employs the Elemental Converter, which converts matter into energy more efficiently, even though he is capable of feeding without it. Alternatively, Galactus can absorb energy directly from cosmic beings and even mystical entities—though with unpredictable results. Possessing this cosmic energy allows Galactus to utilize a force known as the Power Cosmic to perform great feats, which have included universal cosmic awareness, telepathy, telekinesis, energy projection; size alteration; transmutation of matter; teleportation of objects across space, the creation of force fields and interdimensional portals; the creation of life, the resurrection of the dead, manipulating souls, memories and emotions, and mass-scale events such as recreating dead worlds in every detail (including illusions of their entire populations) and destroying multiple planetary systems simultaneously.

To aid in his search for suitable planets, Galactus frequently appoints an individual as his herald, granting each one in turn a small fraction of the Power Cosmic. This power replaces the auras (or souls) of the recipient, with each wielder's physical form adapting to store the energy and in turn allow manipulation for feats such as energy projection. Galactus is also capable of removing the Power Cosmic from the herald.

Galactus also possesses scientific knowledge that is beyond comprehension as one of the oldest living entities in the universe. He is capable of building massive starships of his own design, humanoid robots called Punishers used to battle foes beneath his attention, and the Solar System-sized and Möbius strip-shaped space station named Taa II. Mr. Fantastic has speculated that Taa II may be the greatest source of energy in the universe.

== Ultimate Nullifier ==
The Ultimate Nullifier, a device capable of completely erasing any chosen target from existence, was initially believed to be linked to or created by Galactus. In the Nullifier's first appearance in Fantastic Four #50, Uatu sends the Human Torch to retrieve it from Taa II, a massive structure built as a monument to the original world of Taa. While this issue presents the Ultimate Nullifier as originating from Taa II, later sources list its origins as unknown. Its destructive potential is emphasized by the fact that Galactus retreats when threatened with its use.

The Ultimate Nullifier is generally kept within Taa II, though at times Galactus has been known to carry it aboard his spherical starship. If the Nullifier is stolen or kept in other locales such as the Fantastic Four's headquarters, it inevitably returns to Galactus' possession. In the Abraxas saga, Galactus demonstrates the ability to summon the Nullifier at will and states it to be a part of himself.

The 2022 storyline "Reckoning War" reveals that the Ultimate Nullifier was created by the Watchers during a war with the Prosilicans and was used to kill 90% of the universe's population.

The Ultimate Nullifier is capable of erasing from existence anything its wielder can fully comprehend, such as destroying an entire universe if the wielder could conceive of it in its entirety. However, most beings lack the focus to control the Nullifier, and misuse can result in the annihilation of the wielder as well as the target. Accounts from Uatu describe a power-adjustment mechanism capable of erasing a solar system in a microsecond, and its effects have been depicted as either a spreading sphere of nullification or directed energy beams. In some instances, beings destroyed by the Nullifier are sent to the realm of Oblivion, with the Time Variance Authority and Uatu stating that its use erases the target and all traces of their actions from reality.

== Heralds ==
The Silver Surfer is a recurring ally and herald of Galactus, and was the first herald to be introduced into the Marvel Universe. Other characters have also filled the role of a herald intermittently.

Characters who debuted as heralds or creations of Galactus:

- Tyrant (deceased)
- Fallen One (deceased)
- Air-Walker (deceased)
- Firelord (released from Galactus' service)
- Terrax (released from Galactus' service)
- Nova (Frankie Raye) (released from Galactus' service)
- Morg (released from Galactus' service)
- Red Shift (deceased)
- Stardust (banished to the far side of the universe)
- Praeter (missing, fate unknown)

The following characters have fulfilled the role of a herald for only one storyline:

- the Destroyer
- Rom the Space Knight
- Dazzler
- May Parker (as Golden Oldie)
- Human Torch (as the Invisible Boy)
- the Ultimates
- Anti-Man
- Doctor Strange
- Thor
- Ka-Zar
- Kamala Khan

== Other versions ==
Various alternate universe versions of Galactus have appeared throughout the character's publication history.

- Galactiac, a composite character based on Galactus and DC Comics character Brainiac from Earth-9602, appears in Amalgam Comics. In addition to consuming planetary energy, he leaves parts of the worlds he consumes intact for personal study.
- In Earth X, Galactus is one of three cosmic entities who keep the Celestials in check, with his role being to consume planets to prevent them from overpopulating the universe.
- On Earth-610102, Galactus is the progenitor of Galacta, who originated as a parasite in his body.
- In New Mangaverse, Galactus possesses a single eye, tentacles, and "Galactus spores" that aid in its digestion.
- In Last Planet Standing, Galactus merged with the Silver Surfer, vowing to repair rather than destroy worlds.
- In the Ultimate Marvel universe, Galactus is referred to as Gah Lak Tus and is a hive mind of city-sized robotic drones that telepathically broadcast fear into planets' inhabitants, then send envoys to introduce a flesh-eating virus onto planets. Eons ago, the Kree built Gah Lak Tus to "purify" the universe, but it escaped their control and evolved into its current form.

== In other media ==
=== Television ===
- Galactus appears in a self-titled episode of Fantastic Four (1967), voiced by Ted Cassidy. This version sports green skin and blue armor.
- Galactus appears in Fantastic Four (1994), voiced by Tony Jay.
- Galactus appears in Silver Surfer (1998), voiced by James Blendick.
- Galactus appears in The Super Hero Squad Show, voiced by George Takei.
- Galactus makes non-speaking appearances in The Avengers: Earth's Mightiest Heroes. This version feeds on antimatter in addition to planetary energy, which he achieves by using life-siphoning machines to convert normal matter into antimatter. Additionally, he was responsible for the destruction of the Skrull home planet Skrullos. After attacking Earth, Galactus is defeated by the Avengers and sent to the Negative Zone, where he can consume its energy indefinitely.
- Imaginary versions of Galactus make non-speaking cameo appearances in Ultimate Spider-Man.
- Galactus appears in the Hulk and the Agents of S.M.A.S.H. episode "Galactus Goes Green", voiced by John DiMaggio.
- Galactus appears in the Avengers Assemble episode "Guardians and Space Knights", voiced again by John DiMaggio.

=== Film ===
Galactus as he appears in Fantastic Four: Rise of the Silver Surfer (2007)

- Galactus makes a non-speaking appearance in Fantastic Four: Rise of the Silver Surfer. This version is depicted as surrounded by a cosmic cloud as production company 20th Century Fox wished for the character to remain "discreet". Visual effects studio Weta Digital convinced Fox to add hints of the character's comic-book appearance, including a shadow and a fiery mass inside the cloud resembling Galactus' helmet. Director Tim Story said he obscured Galactus behind a cloud so a future Silver Surfer spin-off film would be unique as the character had yet to appear in comic-book form. Film writer J. Michael Straczynski stated "You don't want to sort of blow out something that big and massive for one quick shot in the first movie."
- Galactus appears in Lego Marvel Avengers: Mission Demolition as a vacuum cleaner.
- Galactus appears in The Fantastic Four: First Steps, portrayed by Ralph Ineson. In the film, Galactus has his herald Shalla-Bal mark Earth for destruction. When the Fantastic Four approach him, Galactus senses a powerful force within Sue (her and Reed's unborn child Franklin). Promising to spare Earth in exchange for giving his immense power and hunger to Franklin, he induces Sue to go into labor early and deliver Franklin. They refuse and return to Earth only to have Galactus follow them. Using Franklin as bait, the team successfully use an interstellar teleporter to send Galactus to another galaxy.

=== Video games ===
- Galactus appears in Silver Surfer (1990).
- Galactus appears in Fantastic 4: Flame On.
- Galactus appears in Marvel: Ultimate Alliance, voiced by Gregg Berger and Peter Renaday in the closing cutscene.
- Galactus appears in LittleBigPlanet via a Marvel-themed DLC.
- Galactus appears in Spider-Man: Web of Shadows.
- Galactus appears in Marvel Super Hero Squad.
- Galactus appears in Marvel Super Hero Squad: The Infinity Gauntlet, voiced by George Takei.
- Galactus appears as the final boss of Marvel vs. Capcom 3: Fate of Two Worlds and Ultimate Marvel vs. Capcom 3, voiced by Jonathan Adams. Additionally, he appears as a playable character in the latter via "Galactus Mode".
- Galactus appears in Pinball FX 2.
- Galactus appears in Lego Marvel Super Heroes, voiced by John DiMaggio.
- Galactus appears as a boss in Marvel Puzzle Quest.
- Galactus appears in Fortnite Battle Royale.
- Galactus appears in Marvel Cosmic Invasion, voiced by James C. Mathis III.
