= Watcher (comics) =

Fictional extraterrestrial species in Marvel Comics

- Watchers depicted in artwork for the cover of Original Sin # 8 (September 2014, Marvel Comics); Art by Julian Totino Tedesco

Publication information
- Publisher: Marvel Comics
- First appearance: Fantastic Four #13 (April 1963)
- Created by: Stan Lee; Jack Kirby

Characteristics
- Notable members: Uatu; Aron
- Inherent abilities: Superhuman strength, intellect, stamina, durability and longevity Energy and molecular manipulation Psionic powers Teleportation

The Watchers are a race of fictional extraterrestrials appearing in American comic books published by Marvel Comics. They are commonly depicted as all-powerful beings who watch over the fictional universes and the stories that take place in them, and are not allowed to interact with other characters, though they have done so on several occasions, when the situation demanded it. Created by Stan Lee and Jack Kirby, the first Watcher to appear in the comics—named Uatu—debuted in Fantastic Four #13 (April 1963).

The Watchers have been featured in several forms of media outside of comics. In the Marvel Cinematic Universe (MCU), they first appeared in the film Guardians of the Galaxy Vol. 2 (2017); Uatu (voiced by Jeffrey Wright) has a main role in the Disney+ series, What If...? (2021-2024).

== Fictional history ==
The Watchers are one of the oldest species in the universe and are committed to observing and compiling knowledge on all aspects of the universe. This policy of total non-interference came into existence due to a former, well-meant attempt by the Watchers to bestow advanced knowledge on the Prosilicans, who used the nuclear technology gained to create weapons and destroy themselves. When the Watchers returned to Prosilicus, the survivors blamed them for causing the catastrophe by giving the Prosilicans nuclear technology before they were ready for it. The Watchers then took a vow never to interfere with other civilizations.

Uatu defies the Watchers' vow of non-interference to aid Earth's heroes, including the Fantastic Four. After interfering with the mission of Mar-Vell, Uatu is put on trial by his own race, but is released on the provision that he never directly interfere again.

Uatu is later banished by his race for aiding the Fantastic Four against the threat of his rogue nephew, Aron, who tries to destroy the universe. The other Watchers have interfered in other civilizations' events, though rarely, notably when the world-ending robot Omegex approached the Milky Way and they deemed it dangerous enough to act directly against it.

When Nova briefly visits Uatu and witnesses him watching various alternate realities, he learns that Uatu's father was the Watcher who originally gave nuclear technology to the Prosilicans, with Uatu's search of parallel universes being motivated by the desire to find the one world where his father's act of charity was proved to be the right thing to do. Three of Uatu's brothers and sisters broke their non-interference vow by judging Nick Fury and making him into a Watcher.

== Powers and abilities ==
The Watchers are cosmic beings, who possess vast physical and mental abilities including energy manipulation, telepathy, appearance altering, and teleportation. They also have access to highly advanced technology.

== Known Watchers ==
- Acba – A Watcher who was present during the universe's potential collapse.
- Aron – A renegade Watcher.
- Critics – A branch of the Watchers who comment on everything they observe.
- Ecce – A Watcher who encountered the newborn Galactus. Despite realizing the danger of Galactus's existence, Ecce chose not to kill him.
- Edda – A Watcher who was present during the universe's potential collapse.
- Egma – A Watcher who was present during the universe's potential collapse.
- Eihu – A Watcher who witnessed and affected the outcome of the battle between the Stranger and Overmind.
- Emnu – The leader of the Homeworld High Council who opposed the Prosilicus experiment.
- Engu – A Watcher who was present at the trial of Uatu.
- Eta – A female Watcher who lives in Weirdworld.
- He Who Summons – The leader of the Watchers who engaged Exitar the Celestial.
- Ikor – The father of Uatu who proposed the Prosilicus experiment.
- Ing – A Watcher who was present at the trial of Uatu.
- Ocam – A Watcher who witnessed and affected the outcome of the battle between the Stranger and Overmind.
- The One – The repository of the Watchers' collective knowledge and observations throughout the eons. He was later killed by Exitar the Celestial.
- Otmu – A Watcher who operates in a sector of the Shi'ar galaxy.
- Qyre – A Watcher who discovered the recluses.
- Talmadge – A newborn Watcher.
- Ualu – A Watcher who was present when Quasar fought Otmu.
- Uatu – Originally assigned to Earth, Uatu was the first Watcher to break with his people's principles of non-interference by allying with the Fantastic Four against Galactus.
- Uilig – A Watcher on Earth-691 who was the survivor of the Hawk God's attack on the Watchers.
- Ulana – A female Watcher and Uatu's lover.
- Uravo – A young female Watcher who was sent to find Uatu when he had abandoned his post on Earth.
- Ute – A Watcher from Earth-374 who told the history of Proctor to the Avengers.
- Watcher of the Calishee – A Watcher who observed the planet Calishee.
- Xecu
- Zoma – A Watcher who was present at the trial of the recluses under She-Hulk.

== Other versions ==
=== Earth X ===
In the alternate reality of Earth X (Earth-9997), the Watchers are slaves of the Celestials. As punishment for their non-interference during the birth of Galactus, the Celestials force the Watchers to observe planets being implanted with Celestial eggs, which will eventually destroy the planets.

=== Ultimate Marvel ===
In Ultimate Origins, the Watchers are depicted as machines that speak through a human host (Sue Storm). They choose Rick Jones as their herald to help humans survive an upcoming crisis.

== In other media ==
=== Television ===
- Uatu appears in "The Incredible Hulk" segment of The Marvel Super Heroes.
- Uatu appears in Fantastic Four (1967), voiced by Paul Frees.
- Uatu makes a cameo appearance in the X-Men: The Animated Series episode "The Dark Phoenix Saga (Part 3): The Dark Phoenix".
- Uatu appears in Fantastic Four (1994), voiced by Alan Oppenheimer.
- The Watchers appear in Silver Surfer.
- Uatu appears in The Super Hero Squad Show, voiced by Dave Boat.
- Uatu appears in the Robot Chicken episode "Tapping a Hero", voiced by Tom Root.
- Uatu appears in Avengers Assemble, voiced by Clancy Brown.
- Uatu appears in the Hulk and the Agents of S.M.A.S.H. episode "The Trouble with Machines", voiced again by Clancy Brown.
- Uatu makes a cameo appearance in the X-Men '97 episode "Remember It".

=== Marvel Cinematic Universe ===
The Watchers appear in media set in the Marvel Cinematic Universe (MCU):

- Three Watchers make a cameo appearance in the live-action film Guardians of the Galaxy Vol. 2 (2017), with close-ups portrayed by Walt Linscott augmented by VFX. They meet with an informant (portrayed by Stan Lee), who tells the uninterested group about his experiences on Earth before leaving him as he shouts at them stating that they are his ride back to his home. Director and screenwriter James Gunn has stated that the scene was created because of the online fan-theory that Lee's cameos throughout the franchise were due to his relation to the Watchers.
- Uatu the Watcher appears in the Disney+ animated series What If...? (2021) and I Am Groot (2023), voiced by Jeffrey Wright. Additionally, three Watchers called the Eminence (voiced by Jason Isaacs), the Incarnate (voiced by D. C. Douglas), and the Executioner (voiced by Darin De Paul) appear in What If...?'s third season.

=== Video games ===
Uatu appears in Marvel: Ultimate Alliance, voiced by Phil LaMarr.

=== Miscellaneous ===
The Watcher is the title of a web series that runs on Marvel's official YouTube page, hosted and written by Lorraine Cink, which features news about Marvel comics, film, television, and toys.
