= List of Avengers members =

List of all members of the avengers

The Avengers are various teams of superheroes that have headlined in The Avengers and related comic books series published by Marvel Comics. Over the decades, the Avengers are featured as a rotating line up of a large number of characters.

Textless and wraparound cover of Avengers, vol. 3 #1 by George Pérez.

According to various handbooks, members of the main team of Avengers, the first iteration of the West Coast Avengers, the New Avengers, Mighty Avengers, Secret Avengers, Avengers Unity Squad and Avengers A.I. are considered official Avengers.

Notations:

- A slash (/) between names signifies that the character has used multiple codenames as an Avenger, listed in chronological order from left to right, with the most recent name appearing last.
- Characters listed in **bold** are the current members of the teams.
  - If a character has multiple codenames, the name currently in use is bolded.
- Characters listed are set in the Earth-616 continuity except when noted.

== Founding members ==
The founding members formed the main team of Avengers in response to a threat of Loki in 1963.

Character	Name	Joined in	Avengers team
Ant-Man / Giant-Man / Goliath / Yellowjacket / Wasp (Note: These are the leaders of various Avengers teams: Avengers – Black Knight, Black Panther, Black Widow, Captain America, Carol Danvers, Clint Barton, Doctor Druid, Sam Wilson, Hank Pym, Iron Man, Monica Rambeau, Quicksilver, Scarlet Witch, Thor, Vision and Wasp; West Coast Avengers – Clint Barton and Scarlet Witch; New Avengers – Captain America, Carol Danvers, Clint Barton, Iron Man and Luke Cage; Mighty Avengers – Carol Danvers, Hank Pym, Luke Cage and Spectrum; Secret Avengers – Captain America and Clint Barton; Avengers Unity Division – Captain America, Havok and Rogue; Avengers A.I. – Hank Pym; Avengers Emergency Response Squad – Captain America)	Henry "Hank" Jonathan Pym	Avengers #1 (September 1963)	Avengers, West Coast Avengers, Mighty Avengers, Secret Avengers, Avengers A.I.
Hulk	Robert Bruce Banner	Avengers #1 (September 1963)	Avengers, New Avengers
Iron Man	Anthony Edward "Tony" Stark	Earth-616: Avengers #1 (September 1963) Earth-96020: Avengers: Timeslide #1 (February 1996) (Note: An alternate adolescent version of Iron Man from reality 96020 had replaced him in Avengers and then merged with him.)	Avengers, **West Coast Avengers**, New Avengers, Mighty Avengers
Thor Odinson	Originally assumed a false secret identity as Dr. Donald Blake (as a lesson by Odin to teach him humility)	Avengers #1 (September 1963)	Avengers, Avengers Unity Division
Wasp	Janet van Dyne	Avengers #1 (September 1963)	Avengers, West Coast Avengers, Mighty Avengers, Avengers Unity Division, **Avengers Emergency Response Squad**

== Recruits ==
=== 1960s ===
Character	Name	Joined in	Avengers team
**Captain America** / the Captain	Steven "Steve" Rogers	Avengers #4 (March 1964)	Avengers, New Avengers, Secret Avengers, Avengers Unity Division, **Avengers Emergency Response Squad**
**Hawkeye** / Goliath / Ronin	Clinton "Clint" Francis Barton	Avengers #16 (May 1965)	Avengers, West Coast Avengers, Secret Avengers, **Avengers Emergency Response Squad**
Quicksilver	Pietro Maximoff	Avengers #16 (May 1965)	Avengers, West Coast Avengers, Mighty Avengers, Avengers Unity Division
Scarlet Witch	Wanda Maximoff	Avengers #16 (May 1965)	**Avengers**, West Coast Avengers, Avengers Unity Division
Swordsman	Jacques Duquesne	Avengers #20 (September 1965)	Avengers
Hercules Panhellenios		Avengers #45 (October 1967)	Avengers, **Avengers Emergency Response Squad**
Black Panther	T'Challa	Avengers #52 (May 1968)	Avengers
Vision		Avengers #58 (November 1968)	Avengers, West Coast Avengers, Avengers A.I.
Black Knight	Dane Whitman	Avengers #71 (December 1969)	Avengers

=== 1970s ===
Character	Name	Joined in	Avengers team
**Black Widow**	Natasha Romanoff (born Natalia Alianovna Romanova)	Avengers #111 (May 1973)	Avengers, Mighty Avengers, **New Avengers**
Mantis	Brandt (surname)	Giant-Size Avengers #4 (June 1975)	Avengers
Two-Gun Kid	Matthew J. "Matt" Hawk	Avengers #142 (December 1975; reserve) (Note: These reserve members either never gained full-time membership or declined it: Two-Gun Kid, Moondragon, Hellcat, Firebird, Stingray, Rage, Sandman, Machine Man and Silverclaw.)	Avengers
Beast	Henry "Hank" Philip McCoy	Avengers #151 (September 1976) (Note: These members joined on probation/training before they became full-time members or their applications were accepted: Beast and Moondragon in Avengers #137 (1975); Hellcat in Avengers #148 (1976); Jocasta in Avengers #192 (1980) but she became full-time member in Mighty Avengers #21 (2009).; Monica Rambeau in Avengers #227 (1983); Starfox in Avengers #232 (1983); Quasar in Avengers Annual #18 (1989); Crystal in Avengers #336 (1991); Rage was demoted to trainee status in Avengers #341 (1991).)	Avengers, Secret Avengers
Moondragon	Heather Douglas	Avengers #151 (September 1976; reserve)	Avengers
Hellcat	Patricia "Patsy" Walker	Avengers #151 (September 1976; reserve)	Avengers
Ms. Marvel / Warbird / **Captain Marvel**	Carol Susan Jane Danvers	Avengers #183 (May 1979)	**Avengers**, New Avengers, Mighty Avengers
Falcon / Captain America	Samuel "Sam" Thomas Wilson	Avengers #184 (June 1979)	Avengers, Mighty Avengers, Avengers Unity Division

=== 1980s ===
In 1984, the first division of Avengers led to the creation of the West Coast Avengers.

Character	Name	Joined in	Avengers team
**Wonder Man**	Simon Williams	Avengers #194 (April 1980)	Avengers, West Coast Avengers, Mighty Avengers, **Avengers Emergency Response Squad**
Tigra	Greer Grant Nelson	Avengers #211 (September 1981)	Avengers, West Coast Avengers
**She-Hulk**	Jennifer "Jen" Walters	Avengers #221 (July 1982)	Avengers, Mighty Avengers, **Avengers Emergency Response Squad**
Captain Marvel / **Photon** / Spectrum	Monica Rambeau	Avengers #231 (May 1983)	Avengers, Mighty Avengers, **Avengers Emergency Response Squad**
Starfox	Eros	Avengers #243 (May 1984)	Avengers
Mockingbird	Barbara "Bobbi" Morse	West Coast Avengers #1 (September 1984)	West Coast Avengers, New Avengers
Iron Man / **War Machine**	James "Rhodey" Rupert Rhodes	West Coast Avengers #1 (September 1984)	**West Coast Avengers**, Secret Avengers
**Namor the Sub-Mariner**	Namor McKenzie	Avengers #262 (December 1985)	Avengers, **New Avengers**
Thing	Benjamin "Ben" Jacob Grimm	West Coast Avengers, vol. 2 #9 (June 1986)	West Coast Avengers, New Avengers
Doctor Druid	Anthony Ludgate Druid	Avengers #278 (April 1987)	Avengers
Espirita / Firebird	Bonita Juárez	West Coast Avengers, vol. 2 #24 (September 1987; reserve)	West Coast Avengers
Moon Knight	Marc Spector / Steven Grant / Jake Lockley	West Coast Avengers, vol. 2 #33 (June 1988)	West Coast Avengers, Avengers, Secret Avengers
Demolition Man	Dennis Dunphy	Captain America #349 (January 1989)	Avengers
Forgotten One / Gilgamesh		Avengers #300 (February 1989)	Avengers
Mister Fantastic	Reed Richards	Avengers #300 (February 1989)	Avengers
Invisible Woman	Susan "Sue" Storm Richards	Avengers #300 (February 1989)	Avengers
U.S. Agent	Jonathan "John" Walker	West Coast Avengers, vol. 2 #44 (May 1989)	West Coast Avengers, Mighty Avengers
Quasar	Wendell Elvis Vaughn	Avengers #305 (July 1989)	Avengers
**Human Torch**	Jim Hammond (legal name)	West Coast Avengers #50 (November 1989)	West Coast Avengers, Secret Avengers, **Avengers Emergency Response Squad**

=== 1990s ===
Character	Name	Joined in	Avengers team
Sersi		Avengers #314 (February 1990)	Avengers
**Spider-Man**	Peter Benjamin Parker	Avengers #316 (April 1990)	**Avengers**, New Avengers, Mighty Avengers
Stingray	Walter Newell	Avengers #319 (July 1990; reserve)	Avengers
Rage	Elvin Daryl Haliday	Avengers #329 (February 1991; reserve)	Avengers
Sandman	William "Flint Marko" Baker	Avengers #329 (February 1991; reserve)	Avengers
Machine Man	X-51	West Coast Avengers #69 (April 1991; reserve)	West Coast Avengers
Spider-Woman	Julia Eugenia Cornwall Carpenter	West Coast Avengers #74 (September 1991)	West Coast Avengers
Living Lightning / **Lightning**	Miguel Santos	West Coast Avengers #74 (September 1991)	West Coast Avengers, **Avengers Emergency Response Squad**
Thor / Thunderstrike	Eric Kevin Masterson	Avengers #343 (January 1992)	Avengers
Crystal	Crystalia Amaquelin Maximoff	Avengers #343 (January 1992)	Avengers
Darkhawk	Christopher "Chris" Powell	West Coast Avengers #94 (May 1993)	West Coast Avengers
Justice	Vance Astrovik	Avengers, vol. 3 #7 (August 1998)	Avengers
**Firestar**	Angelica Jones	Avengers, vol. 3 #7 (August 1998)	Avengers, **West Coast Avengers**

=== 2000s ===
In 2005, the New Avengers were formed due to a mass break-out at a supervillain prison, the Raft. The New Avengers chose not to comply with superhuman registration as opposed to the government formed/sanctioned team the Mighty Avengers in 2007.

Character	Name	Joined in	Avengers team
Triathlon	Delroy Garrett	Avengers, vol. 3 #27 (April 2000)	Avengers
Silverclaw	Maria de Guadalupe "Lupe" Santiago	Avengers, vol. 3 #30 (July 2000; reserve)	Avengers
Jack of Hearts	Jonathan "Jack" Hart	Avengers, vol. 3 #43 (August 2001)	Avengers
Ant-Man	Scott Edward Harris Lang	Avengers, vol. 3 #62 (February 2003)	Avengers
Captain Britain	Kelsey Shorr Leigh	Avengers, vol. 3 #81 (April 2004)	Avengers
**Luke Cage**	Carl Lucas (birth name)	New Avengers #3 (March 2005)	New Avengers, Mighty Avengers, **Avengers**
**Wolverine**	James "Logan" Howlett	New Avengers #6 (June 2005)	New Avengers, **Avengers**, Avengers Unity Division
Sentry	Robert "Bob" Reynolds	New Avengers #10 (October 2005)	New Avengers, Mighty Avengers
Ronin / Echo / Phoenix	Maya Lopez	New Avengers #11 (November 2005)	New Avengers, Avengers
Doctor Strange	Stephen Vincent Strange	New Avengers #27 (February 2007)	New Avengers, Avengers
Iron Fist	Daniel "Danny" Thomas Rand-Kai	New Avengers #27 (February 2007)	New Avengers
Ares		Mighty Avengers #1 (March 2007)	Mighty Avengers
**Spider-Woman**	Jessica Miriam Drew	New Avengers #48 (December 2008)	Avengers, New Avengers **West Coast Avengers**
Captain America / **Winter Soldier**	James Buchanan "Bucky" Barnes	New Avengers #48 (December 2008)	Avengers, **New Avengers**
Amadeus Cho		Mighty Avengers #21 (February 2009)	Mighty Avengers
Jocasta	Jocasta	Mighty Avengers #21 (February 2009)	Avengers, Mighty Avengers
Stature	Cassandra "Cassie" Eleanor Lang	Mighty Avengers #22 (March 2009)	Mighty Avengers
Vision	Jonas	Mighty Avengers #22 (March 2009)	Mighty Avengers

=== 2010s ===
In 2010, the black ops team of Secret Avengers was created. After the events of Avengers vs. X-Men in 2012, Captain America created Avengers Unity Division by recruiting members from both Avengers and X-Men. In 2013, Hank Pym led the team of Avengers A.I.

Character	Name	Joined in	Avengers team
Valkyrie	Brunnhilde	Secret Avengers #1 (May 2010)	Secret Avengers
Agent 13	Sharon Carter	Secret Avengers #1 (May 2010)	Secret Avengers
Black Ant	Eric O'Grady	Secret Avengers #1 (May 2010)	Secret Avengers
Nova	Richard Rider	Secret Avengers #1 (May 2010)	Secret Avengers
Jewel / Power Woman	Jessica Campbell Jones	New Avengers, vol. 2 #1 (June 2010)	New Avengers
Protector	Noh-Varr	Avengers, vol. 4 #6 (October 2010)	Avengers
Red Hulk	Thaddeus E. "Thunderbolt" Ross	Avengers, vol. 4 #12 (April 2011)	Avengers
**Daredevil**	Matthew "Matt" Murdock	New Avengers, vol. 2 #16 (September 2011)	New Avengers, **Avengers**
**Storm**	Ororo Munroe	Avengers, vol. 4 #19 (November 2011)	Avengers
Quake	Daisy Johnson	Avengers, vol. 4 #19 (November 2011)	Avengers
Captain Britain	Brian Braddock	Secret Avengers #22 (February 2012) (Note: Captain Britain was recruited by Captain America in Age of Heroes #1 (2010) but he did not join the Avengers until Secret Avengers #22 (2012).)	Secret Avengers
Agent Venom	Eugene "Flash" Thompson	Secret Avengers #23 (March 2012)	Secret Avengers
Havok	Alexander "Alex" Summers	Uncanny Avengers #1 (October 2012)	Avengers Unity Division
Hyperion	Marcus Milton	Avengers, vol. 5 #1 (December 2012)	Avengers
Cannonball	Samuel "Sam" Zachary Guthrie	Avengers, vol. 5 #1 (December 2012)	Avengers
Captain Universe	Tamara Devoux	Avengers, vol. 5 #1 (December 2012)	Avengers
Manifold	Eden Fesi	Avengers, vol. 5 #1 (December 2012)	Avengers
Smasher	Isabel "Izzy" Kane	Avengers, vol. 5 #1 (December 2012)	Avengers
Sunspot	Roberto "Bobby" da Costa	Avengers, vol. 5 #1 (December 2012)	Avengers
**Zheng Shang-Chi**		Avengers, vol. 5 #1 (December 2012)	Avengers, **Avengers Emergency Response Squad**
Rogue	Anna Marie LeBeau	Uncanny Avengers #4 (February 2013)	Avengers Unity Division
Sunfire	Shiro Yoshida	Uncanny Avengers #5 (March 2013)	Avengers Unity Division
Victor Mancha		Avengers A.I. #1 (July 2013)	Avengers A.I.
Doombot		Avengers A.I. #1 (July 2013)	Avengers A.I.
Abyss		Avengers, vol. 5 #17 (August 2013)	Avengers
Ex Nihilo		Avengers, vol. 5 #17 (August 2013)	Avengers
Nightmask	Adam Blackveil	Avengers, vol. 5 #17 (August 2013)	Avengers
Starbrand	Kevin Connor	Avengers, vol. 5 #17 (August 2013)	Avengers
Alexis the Protector		Avengers A.I. #3 (September 2013)	Avengers A.I.
Blue Marvel	Adam Brashear	Mighty Avengers, vol 2 #3 (November 2013)	Mighty Avengers
Power Man	Victor Alvarez	Mighty Avengers, vol 2 #3 (November 2013)	Mighty Avengers
Spider Hero / Ronin / Blade	Eric Cross Brooks	Mighty Avengers, vol 2 #3 (November 2013)	Mighty Avengers, Avengers
White Tiger	Ava Ayala	Mighty Avengers, vol 2 #3 (November 2013)	Mighty Avengers
Kaluu		Captain America and the Mighty Avengers #1 (November 2014)	Mighty Avengers
Brother Voodoo	Jericho Drumm	Avengers & X-Men: AXIS #9 (December 2014)	Avengers Unity Division
Nova	Samuel "Sam" Alexander	Nova, vol. 5 #25 (December 2014)	Avengers
Sabretooth	Victor Creed	Uncanny Avengers, vol. 2 #1 (January 2015)	Avengers Unity Division
Deadpool	Wade Winston Wilson	Avengers, vol. 6 #0 (October 2015)	Avengers Unity Division
Human Torch	Jonathan "Johnny" Lowell Spencer Storm	Uncanny Avengers, vol.3 #1 (December 2015)	Avengers Unity Division
Synapse	Emily Guerrero	Uncanny Avengers, vol.3 #1 (December 2015)	Avengers Unity Division
Ms. Marvel	Kamala Khan	All-New All-Different Avengers #1 (November 2015)	Avengers
Spider-Man	Miles Morales	All-New All-Different Avengers #1 (November 2015)	Avengers
Thor / Valkyrie	Jane Foster	All-New All-Different Avengers #1 (November 2015)	Avengers
Cable	Nathan Christopher Charles Summers	Uncanny Avengers, vol. 3 #3 (December 2016)	Avengers Unity Division
Wasp	Nadia van Dyne (birth surname Pym)	Avengers, vol. 7 #1 (November 2016)	Avengers
Avenger X	Cressida	Avengers, vol. 7 #2.1 (December 2016)	Avengers
Ghost Rider	Roberto "Robbie" Reyes	Avengers, vol. 8 #6 (July 2018)	Avengers

=== 2020s ===
After the events of Blood Hunt in 2024, Captain America created the Avengers Emergency Response Squad.

Character	Name	Joined in	Avengers team
Nighthawk	Kyle Richmond	Avengers, vol. 8 #55 (April 2022)	Avengers
Starbrand	Brandy Selby	Avengers, vol. 8 #55 (April 2022)	Avengers
**Impossible City**		Avengers, vol. 9 #6 (October 2023)	**Avengers**
Penance	Monet Yvette Clarisse Maria Therese St. Croix	Uncanny Avengers, vol. 4 #1 (August 2023)	Avengers Unity Division
Psylocke	Kwannon	Uncanny Avengers, vol. 4 #1 (August 2023)	Avengers Unity Division
Hawkeye	Katherine "Kate" Bishop	Avengers, vol. 9 #14 (May 2024) (Note: These members were given honorary status as Avengers before they become full-time members: Hawkeye (Bishop) in Avengers: The Children's Crusade #9 (2012); Hazmat, Lightspeed, and Laura Kinney in Avengers Academy #39 (2012))	Avengers
Hazmat	Jennifer Takeda	Avengers, vol. 9 #14 (May 2024)	Avengers
**Lightspeed**	Julie Power	Avengers Assemble, vol. 2 #1 (September 2024)	**Avengers Emergency Response Squad**
**Night Thrasher**	Dwayne Taylor	Avengers Assemble, vol. 2 #1 (September 2024)	**Avengers Emergency Response Squad**
**Killerwatt** / Blue Bolt / Wonder Man	Chad Braxton (born Thomas "Tommy" Watt)	West Coast Avengers, vol. 4 #1 (November 2024)	**West Coast Avengers**
**Ultron**		West Coast Avengers, vol. 4 #1 (November 2024)	**West Coast Avengers**
**Daredevil**	Elektra Natchios	Astonishing Avengers Infinity Comic #1 (January 2025)	**Avengers Emergency Response Squad**
**Mr. Immortal**	Craig Hollis	Astonishing Avengers Infinity Comic #12 (April 2025)	**Avengers Emergency Response Squad**
**Somnus**	Carl Valentino	Astonishing Avengers Infinity Comic #16 (May 2025)	**Avengers Emergency Response Squad**
**Carnage**	Edward Charles Allan "Eddie" Brock	New Avengers, vol. 5 #3 (June 2025)	**New Avengers**
**Clea Strange**		New Avengers, vol. 5 #3 (June 2025)	**New Avengers**
X-23 / **Wolverine**	Laura Kinney	New Avengers, vol. 5 #3 (June 2025)	**New Avengers**
**She-Thing**	Sharon Ventura	Astonishing Avengers Infinity Comic #20 (June 2025)	**Avengers Emergency Response Squad**
**Beta Ray Bill**		Immortal Thor #25 (July 2025)	**Avengers**
**Phone Ranger**	A. G. Bell	Astonishing Avengers Infinity Comic #28 (September 2025)	**Avengers Emergency Response Squad**
**Captain Beyond**	Elijah Jackson	Astonishing Avengers Infinity Comic #30 (September 2025)	**Avengers Emergency Response Squad**
**Miracleman**	David Colton	Avengers vol. 10 #1 (November 2026)	**Avengers**

== Honorary members ==
Characters granted honorary status for acts of great courage, sacrifice and affiliation with Avengers.

Character	Name	Joined in	Notes
Richard "Rick" Milhouse Jones		Avengers #1 (September 1963)	Honorary member of Avengers.
Aleta Ogord		Avengers #168 (February 1978)	Guardians of the Galaxy from the 31st century, who time-travelled to the 20th century and served as honorary members of Avengers during the Korvac saga.
Charlie-27		Avengers #168 (February 1978)	Guardians of the Galaxy from the 31st century, who time-travelled to the 20th century and served as honorary members of Avengers during the Korvac saga.
Major Victory	Vance Astro (born Vance Astrovik)	Avengers #168 (February 1978)	Guardians of the Galaxy from the 31st century, who time-travelled to the 20th century and served as honorary members of Avengers during the Korvac saga.
Martinex T'Naga		Avengers #168 (February 1978)	Guardians of the Galaxy from the 31st century, who time-travelled to the 20th century and served as honorary members of Avengers during the Korvac saga.
Nicholette "Nikki" Gold		Avengers #168 (February 1978)	Guardians of the Galaxy from the 31st century, who time-travelled to the 20th century and served as honorary members of Avengers during the Korvac saga.
Starhawk	Stakar Ogord	Avengers #168 (February 1978)	Guardians of the Galaxy from the 31st century, who time-travelled to the 20th century and served as honorary members of Avengers during the Korvac saga.
Yondu Udonta		Avengers #168 (February 1978)	Guardians of the Galaxy from the 31st century, who time-travelled to the 20th century and served as honorary members of Avengers during the Korvac saga.
Whizzer	Robert "Bob" L. Frank Sr.	Avengers #173 (July 1978)	Honorary member of Avengers.
Marrina Smallwood		Avengers #282 (August 1987)	Honorary member of Avengers.
Yellowjacket	Rita DeMara	Avengers Annual #17 (January 1988)	Given honorary status of Avengers after assisting Avengers.
Swordsman	Philip Javert	Avengers #357 (December 1992)	Honorary member of Avengers.
Magdalene		Avengers #363 (June 1993)	Honorary member of Avengers.
Deathcry	Sharra Neramani	Avengers #364 (July 1993)	Joined Avengers on probation and was given honorary status in Avengers #399 (June 1996).
Moira Brandon		West Coast Avengers, vol. 2 #100 (November 1993; retconned to occur before West Coast Avengers, vol. 1)	Honorary member of the West Coast Avengers.
Captain Marvel	Mar-Vell	Avengers Log (December 1994; first mention of status)	Given honorary status of Avengers posthumously.
Masque	Whitney Frost	Avengers #397 (April 1996)	A bio-duplicate of Madame Masque, who was given honorary status of Avengers.
Flux	Dennis Sykes	One Month To Live #5 (September 2010)	Honorary member of Avengers.
Hulkling	Dorrek VIII	Avengers: The Children's Crusade #9 (March 2012)	Aftermath of the Children's Crusade storyline, the surviving Young Avengers were given honorary status of Avengers.
Speed	Thomas "Tommy" Shepherd	Avengers: The Children's Crusade #9 (March 2012)	Aftermath of the Children's Crusade storyline, the surviving Young Avengers were given honorary status of Avengers.
Wiccan	William "Billy" Kaplan-Altman	Avengers: The Children's Crusade #9 (March 2012)	Aftermath of the Children's Crusade storyline, the surviving Young Avengers were given honorary status of Avengers.
Finesse	Jeanne Foucault	Avengers Academy #39 (November 2012)	Avengers Academy students given honorary status of Avengers as part of Avengers Third Grade.
Mettle	Ken Mack	Avengers Academy #39 (November 2012)	Avengers Academy students given honorary status of Avengers as part of Avengers Third Grade.
Reptil	Humberto "Berto" Lopez	Avengers Academy #39 (November 2012)	Avengers Academy students given honorary status of Avengers as part of Avengers Third Grade.
Striker	Brandon Sharpe	Avengers Academy #39 (November 2012)	Avengers Academy students given honorary status of Avengers as part of Avengers Third Grade.
Galactus		Avengers, vol. 8 #66 (March 2023)	Honorary member of Avengers.

== Infiltrators ==
Character	Name	Joined in	Notes
Sagittarius		West Coast Avengers #27 (December 1987)	A Life Model Decoy who infiltrated the West Coast Avengers by replacing Hawkeye.
Leo		West Coast Avengers #27 (December 1987)	A Life Model Decoy who infiltrated the West Coast Avengers by replacing Tigra.
Ravonna Lexus Renslayer		Avengers #297 (November 1988)	Infiltrated the East Coast Avengers by posing as Nebula.
H'rpra		West Coast Avengers #91 (February 1993)	A Skrull who infiltrated the West Coast Avengers by replacing Mockingbird.
Anti-Vision		Avengers #360 (March 1993)	Infiltrated the Avengers by impersonating Vision.
Veranke		New Avengers #3 (February 2005)	A Skrull who infiltrated the New Avengers and Mighty Avengers by posing as Spider-Woman.
Loki Laufeyson		Mighty Avengers #21 (February 2009)	Infiltrated and assembled the Mighty Avengers by posing as Scarlet Witch.
Eric O'Grady (Life Model Decoy)		Secret Avengers #24 (March 2012)	Infiltrated the Secret Avengers as by posing as Ant-Man.
Superior Spider-Man	Otto Gunther Octavius	Amazing Spider-Man #698 (November 2012)	Infiltrated the Avengers and Mighty Avengers by impersonating Spider-Man.
Captain America	Grant Rogers	Sam Wilson: Captain America #7 (March 2016)	Alternate version of Captain America created by Kobik; who infiltrated the Avengers by posing as him.
Voyager	Va Nee Gast	Avengers #675 (January 2018)	Infiltrated the Avengers under disguise of a forgotten founding member.

== In other media ==
Members of various iterations of Avengers in Marvel Cinematic Universe.

Character codenames	Short real name	Portrayed by	Joined in	Avengers team
First movie
Captain America	Steve Rogers	Chris Evans	The Avengers (2012)	Avengers
Iron Man	Tony Stark	Robert Downey Jr.	The Avengers (2012)	Avengers
The Hulk	Bruce Banner	Mark Ruffalo	The Avengers (2012)	Avengers
Thor Odinson		Chris Hemsworth	The Avengers (2012)	Avengers
Black Widow	Natasha Romanoff	Scarlett Johansson	The Avengers (2012)	Avengers
Hawkeye	Clint Barton	Jeremy Renner	The Avengers (2012)	Avengers
Later additions
Quicksilver	Pietro Maximoff	Aaron Taylor-Johnson	Avengers: Age of Ultron (2015)	Avengers
Scarlet Witch	Wanda Maximoff	Elizabeth Olsen	Avengers: Age of Ultron (2015)	Avengers
Vision		Paul Bettany	Avengers: Age of Ultron (2015)	Avengers
War Machine	James Rhodes	Don Cheadle	Avengers: Age of Ultron (2015)	Avengers
Falcon / Captain America	Sam Wilson	Anthony Mackie	Avengers: Age of Ultron (2015)	Avengers
Spider-Man	Peter Parker	Tom Holland	Avengers: Infinity War (2018)	Avengers
Ant-Man	Scott Lang	Paul Rudd	Avengers: Endgame (2019)	Avengers
Nebula		Karen Gillan	Avengers: Endgame (2019)	Avengers
Rocket		Bradley Cooper (voice) Sean Gunn (motion capture)	Avengers: Endgame (2019)	Avengers
Captain Marvel	Carol Danvers	Brie Larson	Avengers: Endgame (2019)	Avengers
2020s recruits			Avengers: Endgame (2019)	
Falcon	Joaquin Torres	Danny Ramirez	Captain America: Brave New World (2025)	Avengers
Xu Shang-Chi		Simu Liu	Avengers: Doomsday (2026)	Avengers

== Notes ==
=== Removal from list ===
Many characters were removed from the list that were previously included because their respective teams (A-Force, Avengers Idea Mechanics, Occupy Avengers, Savage Avengers, S.H.I.E.L.D. led Secret Avengers, Ultimates, U.S. Avengers and the second iteration of West Coast Avengers) were declared as not officially sanctioned Avengers by handbooks even if they had affiliation or used their name.
