= Guardians of the Galaxy =

Film series logo since 2014

The Guardians of the Galaxy are a superhero team appearing in American comic books published by Marvel Comics.

== Comic book teams ==
=== 1969 team ===
The 1969 version of the Guardians of the Galaxy originate from the 31st century team from an alternate timeline.

=== 2008 team ===
The 2008 version of the Guardians of the Galaxy is the modern version of the team formed in the aftermath of Annihilation: Conquest.

=== New Guard ===
The New Guard version of the Guardians of the Galaxy consisted of Kitty Pryde, Thing, Drax, Venom, Rocket Raccoon, Groot, and later Star-Lord and Gamora.

== Other versions ==
An alternate timeline version of the Guardians of the Galaxy appears in the Ultimate Universe imprint. This version of the group originates from the 61st century, an utopian future in which about 250,000 Guardians protect millions of worlds, integrating the Shi'ar Imperial Guard to their ranks. The Guardians consist of Captain Marvel, Star-Lord, Ultimate Nullifier, and Cosmo Starstalker as well as Starhawk, Yondu, Charlie-27, Aleta Ogord, Martinex, an unidentified Captain Universe, Star Brand, Gladiator, Fang, Hobgoblin, Magique, Manta, and Starbolt. America Chavez was previously a member of the Guardians until she was displaced in time and rendered amnesiac. Following a battle with Kang the Conqueror's forces, many of the Guardians members are lost across time, with the remaining Guardians traveling throughout time to find them.

During the events of "Ultimate Endgame", the Guardians of the Galaxy assist in fighting the Maker's forces, transporting them to another dimension.

== In other media ==
- "Michael Korvac", The Avengers: Earth's Mightiest Heroes season 2, episode 6 (2012)
- "Guardians of the Galaxy", Ultimate Spider-Man season 2, episode 18 (2013)
- Guardians of the Galaxy (film), the 2014 film based on the 2008 comic book version
  - Guardians of the Galaxy (Marvel Cinematic Universe), the team in the Marvel Cinematic Universe
  - Guardians of the Galaxy (soundtrack), the soundtrack for the film
  - Guardians of the Galaxy (TV series), an animated series inspired by the film
- "Guardians of the Galaxy", Hulk and the Agents of S.M.A.S.H. season 2, episode 4 (2014)
- Guardians of the Galaxy Vol. 2, the 2017 sequel to the 2014 film
  - Guardians of the Galaxy Vol. 2 (soundtrack), the soundtrack for the film
- Guardians of the Galaxy: The Telltale Series, an episodic video game series, developed by Telltale Games
- Marvel's Guardians of the Galaxy video game (2021)
- The Guardians of the Galaxy Holiday Special (2022)
- Guardians of the Galaxy Vol. 3, the 2023 sequel to the 2014 and 2017 films

== Other uses ==
- Guardians of the Galaxy – Mission: Breakout, drop tower theme park attraction at Disney California Adventure
- Guardians of the Galaxy: Cosmic Rewind, an enclosed, backwards-launch roller coaster at Epcot

== See also ==
- List of Guardians of the Galaxy members
- Guardians of the Universe, an unrelated race from DC Comics
