= List of Guardians of the Galaxy members =

The Guardians of the Galaxy are a superhero team that has starred in the comic book series of the same name, published by Marvel Comics. The original team, based in an alternate universe within the Marvel Comics continuity, debuted in the comic book Marvel Super-Heroes #18 (January 1969). Another team, this time based in the mainstream Marvel Universe, debuted in the comic Guardians of the Galaxy (vol. 2) #1 (May 2008).

== Original team ==
These are the members of the original, Earth-691 Guardians of the Galaxy team.

Character	Real Name	Joined in	Notes
Yondu	Yondu Udonta	Marvel Super-Heroes #18 (1969)	Centaurian
Major Victory	Vance Astro	Marvel Super-Heroes #18 (1969)	Human from the 20th Century
Martinex	Martinex T'Naga	Marvel Super-Heroes #18 (1969)	Pluvian
Charlie-27		Marvel Super-Heroes #18 (1969)	Jovian
Starhawk	Stakar Ogord	Defenders #29 (1975)	Arcturian
Nikki	Nicholette Gold	Marvel Presents #4 (1976)	Mercurian
Aleta Ogord		Guardians of the Galaxy vol. 1 Annual #1 (1991)	Arcturian
Replica		Guardians of the Galaxy vol. 1 #14 (1991)	Skrull
Talon		Guardians of the Galaxy vol. 1 #20 (1992)	Inhuman
Yellowjacket	Rita DeMara	Guardians of the Galaxy vol. 1 #34 (1993)	Human from the 20th Century
Geena Drake		Guardians of the Galaxy vol. 3 #14 (2014)	Human from the 31st Century

=== Galactic Guardians ===
Character	Real Name	Joined in	Notes
Martinex	Martinex T'Naga	Guardians of the Galaxy Annual #2 (1992)	Team Leader
Hollywood	Simon Williams	Guardians of the Galaxy Annual #2 (1992)	
Mainframe		Guardians of the Galaxy Annual #2 (1992)	
Replica		Guardians of the Galaxy Annual #2 (1992)	
Firelord	Pyreus Kril	Guardians of the Galaxy Annual #2 (1992)	
Phoenix	Giraud	Guardians of the Galaxy Annual #2 (1992)	
Spirit of Vengeance	Wileaydus Autolycus	Guardians of the Galaxy Annual #2 (1992)	

== Modern team ==
These are the members of the mainstream Marvel Universe Guardians of the Galaxy team. They are separated by the period when they joined.

- Characters in **bold** are members of the team as of the present time.
- Characters listed are set in the Earth-616 continuity except when noted.

Character	Real Name	Joined in	Notes
**Star-Lord**	Peter Jason Quill	Guardians of the Galaxy vol. 2 #1 (2008)	Team leader
**Gamora**	Gamora Zen Whoberi Ben Titan	Guardians of the Galaxy vol. 2 #1 (2008)	
Drax the Destroyer	Arthur Sampson Douglas	Guardians of the Galaxy vol. 2 #1 (2008)	Dies in Guardians of the Galaxy Vol. 5 Annual #1
**Rocket Raccoon**		Guardians of the Galaxy vol. 2 #1 (2008)	
Adam Warlock		Guardians of the Galaxy vol. 2 #1 (2008)	
Phyla-Vell		Guardians of the Galaxy vol. 2 #1 (2008)	Changed name to Martyr in Guardians of the Galaxy vol. 2 #12 (May 2009). An alternate reality counterpart joins in Guardians of the Galaxy vol. 5 #1 as Captain Marvel.
**Groot**		Guardians of the Galaxy vol. 2 #7 (2009)	Appeared as a sapling beginning in Guardians of the Galaxy vol. 2 #1 (July 2008); joined active team after fully regrowing.
**Mantis**	Brandt, first name unknown	Guardians of the Galaxy vol. 2 #7 (2009)	Served as an advisor beginning in Guardians of the Galaxy vol. 2 #1 (July 2008) before becoming an active member.
Major Victory	Vance Astro	Guardians of the Galaxy vol. 2 #7 (2009)	Also member of the alternate reality Guardians of the Galaxy team.
Bug		Guardians of the Galaxy vol. 2 #7 (2009)	
Jack Flag	Jack Harrison	Guardians of the Galaxy vol. 2 #9 (2009)	
**Moondragon**	Heather Douglas	Guardians of the Galaxy vol. 2 #12 (2009)	Resurrected by Drax and Phyla-Vell. An alternate reality counterpart joins in Guardians of the Galaxy vol. 5 #1.
Cosmo the Spacedog	Cosmo	Guardians of the Galaxy vol. 2 #12 (2009)	Assisted the team beginning in Guardians of the Galaxy vol. 2 #1 (July 2008) before officially joining team.

=== All New All Different Marvel ===
Character	Real Name	Joined in	Notes
Agent Venom	Eugene "Flash" Thompson	Guardians of the Galaxy vol. 3 #14 (2014)	
Kitty Pryde	Katherine Anne Pryde	Guardians of the Galaxy vol. 3 #26 (2015)	Decided to stay in space in Legendary Star-Lord vol. 1 #8 (March 2015). Started travelling with the Guardians in Guardians of the Galaxy vol. 3 #26 (June 2015). Officially joined the team in Guardians of the Galaxy vol. 4 #1 (December 2015). Took the Star-Lord codename from Peter Quill.
Thing	Benjamin Jacob Grimm	Guardians of the Galaxy vol. 4 #1 (2015)	
Ant-Man	Scott Lang	All-New Guardians of the Galaxy #12 (2017)	
Beta Ray Bill		Guardians of the Galaxy vol. 5 #1 (2019)	
Cosmic Ghost Rider	Frank Castle	Guardians of the Galaxy vol. 5 #1 (2019)	A Frank Castle from an alternate reality.

=== Dark Guardians ===
Character	Real Name	Joined in	Notes
Starfox	Eros of Titan	Guardians of the Galaxy vol. 5 #2 (2019)	Leader of the team
**Nebula**		Guardians of the Galaxy vol. 5 #2 (2019)	Current member of the Guardians of the Galaxy
Gladiator	Kallark	Guardians of the Galaxy vol. 5 #2 (2019)	
Wraith	Zak-Del	Guardians of the Galaxy vol. 5 #2 (2019)	
Cosmic Ghost Rider	Frank Castle	Guardians of the Galaxy vol. 5 #2 (2019)	A Frank Castle from an alternate reality.

=== Fresh Start ===
Character	Real Name	Joined in	Notes
Nova	Richard Rider	Guardians of the Galaxy vol. 6 #1 (2020)	Member of the Nova Corps.
**Marvel Boy**	Noh-Varr	Guardians of the Galaxy vol. 6 #1 (2020)	A Kree hero and former member of the Young Avengers.
**Hercules**		Guardians of the Galaxy vol. 6 #1 (2020)	Olympian God
**Super-Skrull**	Kl'rt	Guardians of the Galaxy vol. 6 #12 (2021)	
**Quasar**	Wendell Vaughn	Guardians of the Galaxy vol. 6 #12 (2021)	Both of them share the powers.
Quasar	Avril Kincaid	Guardians of the Galaxy vol. 6 #13 (2021)	Both of them share the powers.
Hulkling	Theodore "Teddy" Altman-Kaplan/Emperor Dorrek VIII	Guardians of the Galaxy vol. 6 #13 (2021)	Member of the Young Avengers.
Wiccan	William "Billy" Kaplan-Altman	Guardians of the Galaxy vol. 6 #13 (2021)	Member of the Young Avengers.
Doctor Doom	Victor von Doom	Guardians of the Galaxy vol. 6 #14 (2021)	

== Marvel Cinematic Universe ==
- A version of the Guardians of the Galaxy exists in the Marvel Cinematic Universe.
- Characters listed in **bold** are members of the team as of the present

Initial members
Character	Portrayed by	Joined in	Notes
Peter Quill / Star-Lord	Chris Pratt	Guardians of the Galaxy (2014)	Left the team to reunite with his family on earth. (Note: As depicted in Guardians of the Galaxy Vol. 3)
Gamora	Zoe Saldaña	Guardians of the Galaxy (2014)	Killed by Thanos. (Note: As depicted in Avengers: Infinity War.) Alternate past variant left to rejoin the Ravagers.
Drax the Destroyer	Dave Bautista	Guardians of the Galaxy (2014)	Left the team to run Knowhere with Nebula.
Groot I	Vin Diesel	Guardians of the Galaxy (2014)	Sacrificed himself to save the rest of the Guardians. (Note: As depicted in Guardians of the Galaxy)
**Rocket**	Bradley Cooper	Guardians of the Galaxy (2014)	Became the leader of the new generation.
**Groot II**	Vin Diesel	Guardians of the Galaxy (2014)	Offspring of the original Groot.
Yondu Udonta	Michael Rooker	Guardians of the Galaxy Vol. 2 (2017)	Sacrificed himself to save Peter Quill. (Note: As depicted in Guardians of the Galaxy Vol. 2.)
Mantis	Pom Klementieff	Guardians of the Galaxy Vol. 2 (2017)	Left to go on a journey of self-discovery.
Nebula	Karen Gillan	Guardians of the Galaxy Vol. 2 (2017)	Left the Guardians to run Knowhere with Drax.
Newer members
Thor	Chris Hemsworth	Avengers: Endgame (2019)	Left the Guardians to stop Gorr. (Note: As depicted in Thor: Love and Thunder.)
**Kraglin Obfonteri**	Sean Gunn	Thor: Love and Thunder (2022)	Remains as one of the four returnees, the other two being Rocket and Groot.
**Cosmo**	Maria Bakalova	The Guardians of the Galaxy Holiday Special (2022)	Remains as one of the four returnees, the other two being Rocket and Groot.
**Adam Warlock**	Will Poulter	Guardians of the Galaxy Vol. 3 (2023)	New recruits for the team's latest iteration.
**Phyla**	Kai Zen	Guardians of the Galaxy Vol. 3 (2023)	New recruits for the team's latest iteration.
**Blurp**	Dee Bradley Baker	Guardians of the Galaxy Vol. 3 (2023)	Adam Warlock's pet.

=== Ravagers ===
Guardians of the Galaxy Vol. 2 (2017) also features a version of the original team, known as the Ravagers.

Character	Portrayed by	First appearance	Notes
**Stakar Ogord**	Sylvester Stallone	Guardians of the Galaxy Vol. 2	
**Aleta Ogord**	Michelle Yeoh	Guardians of the Galaxy Vol. 2	
**Martinex**	Michael Rosenbaum	Guardians of the Galaxy Vol. 2	
**Charlie-27**	Ving Rhames	Guardians of the Galaxy Vol. 2	
**Mainframe**	Miley Cyrus (voice) Tara Strong (voice)	Guardians of the Galaxy Vol. 2	
**Krugarr**	Jared Gore (motion capture)	Guardians of the Galaxy Vol. 2	
Yondu Udonta	Michael Rooker	Guardians of the Galaxy (2014)	Sacrificed himself to save Peter Quill.
**Gamora (2014 variant)**	Zoe Saldaña	Guardians of the Galaxy Vol. 3	A variant from an alternate 2014. (Note: As depicted in Avengers: Endgame.)
