= Captain Universe =

Marvel Comics fictional character

- Captain Universe on the cover of Marvel Spotlight #9 (November 1980). Art by Steve Ditko.

Publication information
- Publisher: Marvel Comics
- First appearance: Micronauts #8 (August 1979)
- Created by: Bill Mantlo (writer); Michael Golden (artist)

In-story information
- Alter ego: Various hosts
- Species: Cosmic entity
- Team affiliations: Kree; Micronauts; Badoon; Guardians of the Galaxy; Avengers; Spider-Army/Web-Warriors
- Notable aliases: Guardian of Eternity; The Avenging Angel; The Hero That Could Be You; The Goddess; God of Light
- Abilities: Superhuman strength, speed, stamina, agility, durability, and senses; Matter/energy manipulation; Power enhancement; Energy blasts; Time travel; Telekinesis; Flight

Captain Universe is a character appearing in American comic books published by Marvel Comics. Created by Bill Mantlo and Michael Golden, the character first appeared in Micronauts #8 (August 1979). Captain Universe is the guardian and protector of Eternity. Rather than a character with a single identity, it is a persona that has merged with several hosts during its publication history.

== Publication history ==
Captain Universe first appeared in Micronauts #8 (August 1979) and was created by Bill Mantlo and Michael Golden.

Captain Universe hosts have appeared in either special one-shots or short stories throughout the years, initially in the first series of the Micronauts in 1979.

Captain Universe was the starring feature in issues #9–11 of the tryout series Marvel Spotlight. The series' editor Al Milgrom recalled being taken away by the concept of a Captain Universe serial: "You could come up with three issues, three disparate individuals — each one very different from the other — and see how they use their powers. They wouldn't necessarily be superheroic types; they'd be regular people who fell into the powers for just one issue. ... But Captain Universe never got his own title, so I'm guessing it didn't sell terribly well." The character appeared sporadically through the remainder of the 1980s in titles such as Marvel Fanfare and Contest of Champions.

His appearances became even scarcer in the 1990s, appearing in Guardians of the Galaxy, What If?, The Amazing Spider-Man, Marvel Comics Presents and Cosmic Powers Unlimited.

In 1994, Captain Universe appeared in a one-shot, coinciding with a promotion, with the claim that readers could have a comic about themselves made for a fee. The comics were generally stock stories, with minor details altered based on information provided by the purchaser. Jeff Christiansen, then a veterinary student and who would later become the force behind the resurgence of the Official Handbook of the Marvel Universe in the mid-2000s, was written and drawn as the official Captain Universe of the comic so that it could be considered an in-continuity comic. The one-shot was titled X-Men/Captain Universe: Sleeping Giants.

In 2005, after a four-year break from comic appearances, Captain Universe returned in the second series of Amazing Fantasy. Also in 2005, a series of one-shot specials were released featuring different characters from the Marvel Universe as the Uni-Power each imbues them with power of Captain Universe. These titles were Captain Universe/Hulk, Captain Universe/Daredevil, Captain Universe/X-23, Captain Universe/Invisible Woman and Captain Universe/Silver Surfer. The Uni-Power made a brief appearance in Nextwave, he also made a "cameo" as Cosmic Spider-Man for the variant cover of Friendly Neighborhood Spider-Man #3 and played an important part in the Death's Head 3.0 saga chronicled in Amazing Fantasy.

Captain Universe made his return in Annihilation: Conquest: Star-Lord and then in Annihilation Conquest #3. Captain Universe later returns to stop the Juggernaut, in an attempt to fulfill his destiny, as seen in The Amazing Spider-Man #627–629.

== Fictional character biography ==
The Enigma Force, or the God of Light, was created by the Celestials as a reaction to Knull. The Uni-Power is an extra-dimensional force that possesses an individual (or on one occasion, twins) in a time of crisis, transforming that person into Captain Universe. As Captain Universe, the transformed person typically retains his or her original personality and appearance, though with Captain Universe's costume and heroic traits superimposed over the original. The Uni-Power itself emanates from the Enigma Force, the exact nature of which, naturally, remains an enigma. It is believed, however, to be connected to the Microverse, home of the Micronauts. Although the Uni-Power typically empowers normal, non-super-powered humans, it has in the past empowered Doctor Strange, Spider-Man, Commander Arcturus Rann of the Micronauts, a toddler, and a dog, among others. Its counterparts in various alternate timelines have also possessed Mar-Vell, Mr. Fantastic, a member of the alien Badoon race, a Doombot, and Quasar. Because of its never-ending supply of energy it has been the target of many individuals, terrorist groups and peacekeeping agencies such as AIM, the Psycho-Man, Doctor Doom and even S.H.I.E.L.D.

The first human Captain Universe was an astronaut named Captain Ray Coffin. He battled Baron Karza and sealed the Prometheus Pit between the Microverse and Earth. Years later, the Uni-Power would possess his son Steve Coffin to battle Mister E and his shadow slaves. It next possessed identical twins Ann Stafford and Clare Dodgson to capture Nemesis, and then possessed small-time cat burglar Monty Walsh to stop mafia don Guido Carboni. It then possessed Doctor Strange and Commander Arcturus Rann to reinforce the space-wall between the Microverse and the Macroverse. It then possessed Bruce Banner for the first time, to defuse a nuclear missile, and wound up battling Banner's own alter ego the Hulk. Captain Universe was then next among the heroes summoned by the Grandmaster for the Contest of Champions. The Captain Universe power next possessed Delayne Masters to defeat schoolyard bullies. It then possessed Evan Swann to stop the Quantum Mechanic from destroying the Earth.

When the Captain Universe power next appeared, it possessed Spider-Man following an accident that imbued Spider-Man with the Uni-Power. It next possessed a toddler called Eddie Price to battle Gart and Rath.

When the Guardians of the Galaxy traveled to the 20th century on a mission to destroy the Badoon, the Uni-Power possessed a Badoon worker named L'Matto to prevent the planned genocide. L'Matto's newfound knowledge was able to keep the Guardians from attacking but the Brother Royal then used the Badoon Captain Universe as his champion in a gladiatorial challenge which he had coerced the Guardians into accepting. L'Matto easily overpowered Charlie-27 and was about to kill him when Vance Astro and Dr. Strange arrived and joined in the battle, with Nikki and Talon pitching in as well. Despite this, it was not until Aleta (who had become the new Starhawk) arrived and attacked alongside Doctor Strange that L'Matto was finally defeated, enabling Strange to exorcise the Uni-Power which L'Matto had abused and return it to Earth.

Captain Universe later returned, and the Uni-Power possesses various heroes (the Hulk; X-23; Daredevil, who regained his sight while possessed; Invisible Woman; Gladiator; and Silver Surfer); all in a mission to restore its power which has been severely weakened from a mysterious force emanating from the darkest corners of the Microverse. Using the copied powers of each hero, it took paraplegic war veteran Gabriel Vargas as its host to face the one responsible for its weakening.

At some unknown point, Captain Universe's latest host Gabriel Vargas is arrested by the Kree government for accidentally attacking a group of Kree who were killing people who he thought were innocents but were actually sympathetic to the genocidal actions of the Annihilation Wave. For months, he was studied by the Kree who, despite their highly advanced technology, could not learn much about the Uni-Power other than that the suit given to all users is actually a molecular shell and not actual clothing as previously believed. Eventually, Gabriel is released from prison and put into a highly aggressive session of training by the Kree Military as he and several other prisoners prepare for a mission to combat the Phalanx. Gabriel loses the Uni-Power after finding a cure for a Phalanx airborne virus and is subsequently killed by Blastaar.

During "The Gauntlet" storyline, a new Captain Universe makes himself known when he arrives on Earth with plans to kill Juggernaut. Spider-Man learns that Captain Universe is a man named William Nguyen, whose life had been ruined in one of Juggernaut's rampages. When Nguyen insists on trying to kill Juggernaut instead of fixing the tectonic plates beneath New York City, the Uni-Power leaves him and enters the Juggernaut. The Juggernaut as Captain Universe repairs the damage to the tectonic plates that was caused by him during the same rampage that had ruined Nguyen's life. After the "healing" of the tectonic plates, the Uni-Power subsequently departs.

Three former hosts of the Uni-Power (Susan Storm, Spider-Man and X-23) are all contacted by the Enigma Force once again when the Whirldemon King, a powerful entity once defeated by the time-traveling Prince Wayfinder of Ithaca and creator of the Enigma Force itself, escapes imprisonment. When X-23 sacrifices herself to save Valeria Richards from possession by the King the Uni-Power bonds with her a second time. While trapped in the Whirldemons' prison dimension, a connection is explicitly made between a starry apparition that enabled Laura to throw off the influence of a demon attempting to coerce her into serving it, when the star-shaped mark left on Laura's palm after that encounter is recognized by the Whirldemon King as associated with the Enigma Force. Laura then uses the Uni-Power to wound the Whirldemon King and seal him back in his prison dimension, before returning her to Earth. During these events, the Enigma Force tells Laura that she has been designated the future heir to its power.

An African-American woman acting as the newest Captain Universe joins the Avengers in the fight against Ex Nihilo, his sister Abyss, and a Builder named Aleph on Mars. Captain Universe vaporizes Aleph when he does not agree to stop transforming or destroying planets. She is revealed to be Tamara Devoux, a woman who remained in a coma for ten years after a car crash. During a talk with Nightmask, she translates his language and announces that not only is the universe dying, but the White Event is coming.

During the "Spider-Geddon" storyline, the Spider-Men summoned the Enigma Force to aid them in their fight. The Enigma Force chose to make Miles Morales the new Captain Universe, which he used to help defeat them. Using the Sword Vigor from Leopardon, Miles was able to defeat Solus, Brix, Bora, and Daemos. The Enigma Force left him after the battle was won.

During the "King in Black" storyline, the Enigma Force is revealed by Jean Grey to be the "God of Light" of the Marvel Universe, with properties similar to those of symbiotes and counterpart of the dark deity Knull. Silver Surfer goes to the Enigma Force and frees it from the symbiotes, leading to it choosing Eddie Brock as the new Captain Universe.

== Powers and abilities ==
The cosmic entity possesses superhuman attributes, such as superhuman strength, speed, stamina, agility, durability, and senses. Its Uni-Vision power is a form of cosmic consciousness, granting a variety of incredible powers from manipulating cosmic energy. The cosmic being has a psychic awareness of imminent danger. It is capable of molecular rearrangement of organic and inorganic matter, transmutation of elements, firing bursts of energy and concussive force, and hypnosis (using the Uni-Vision energy). The character can also use telekinesis.

The abilities of Captain Universe can vary from host to host. The cosmic entity enhances their partner's powers if they possess one or more similar abilities.

The power of the Enigma Force is tied to the dimension of its origin. The wielder will lose their powers if they travel to other realities.

== Hosts ==
| Character | Real Name | Possessed in | Notes | Ref. |
|---|---|---|---|---|
| Raymond Coffin | | Micronauts #8 (1979) | A retired astronaut who was the first Captain Universe. | |
| Steven Coffin | | Marvel Spotlight #9 (1980) | Son of Ray Coffin. | |
| Clare Dodgson | | Marvel Spotlight (vol. 2) #10 (1981) | A private investigator. Shared possession with her twin sister, Ann Stanford. | |
| Ann Stanford | | Marvel Spotlight (vol. 2) #10 (1981) | A homemaker and the mother of Jenny and Johnny Dodgson. Shared possession with her twin sister Clare Dodgson. | |
| Montgomery Walsh | | Marvel Spotlight (vol. 2) #11 (1981) | A cat burglar who became Captain Universe after he was shot when trying to rob the house of former Maggia boss Guido Carboni. After Montgomery defeated Carboni, the Enigma Power left him as Montgomery dies and the police find Carboni raving that Montgomery had been Captain Universe. | |
| Arcturus Rann | | Micronauts #35 (1981) | Leader of the Micronauts. Merged with Doctor Strange. | |
| Doctor Strange | Stephen Strange | Micronauts #35 (1981) | The Sorcerer Supreme. Merged with Commander Arcturus Rann. | |
| Hulk | Robert Bruce Banner | The Incredible Hulk (vol. 2) Annual #10 (1981); Captain Universe/Hulk #1 (2005) | First human to become Captain Universe twice. When possessed by the Uni-Power, Hulk's skin turns blue. | |
| Unnamed Female Host | ?? | Marvel Super-Heroes Contest of Champions #1 (1982) | | |
| Delayne Masters | | Marvel Fanfare #25 (1986) | A young student. | |
| Evan Swann | | Web of Spider-Man Annual #5 (1989) | A scientist. | |
| Spider-Man | Peter Parker | The Spectacular Spider-Man #158 (Dec. 1989) | The Captain Universe power possessed Spider-Man following an accident with a device designed to channel unknown energies. | |
| Edward Price | | Web of Spider-Man Annual #6 (1990) | A toddler who became possessed by the Enigma Power to protect his parents from two demons named Gart and Rath who were summoned by Jane and Roger Price. | |
| Jeffrey Christiansen | | Quasar #20 (1991) (mentioned); X-Men/Captain Universe: Sleeping Giants #1 (1994) (seen) | A veterinary physician and freelance writer. | |
| Captain Beyond | Elijah Jackson | Marvel Comics Presents #148 (1994) | A former baseball player who was left in a vegetative state by an unspecified disease. He became possessed by the Enigma Power to protect his daughter Simone from a street gang. | |
| Roland Taylor | | Cosmic Powers Unlimited #5 (1996) | A freelance writer. | |
| Ted Simmons | | Amazing Fantasy (vol. 2) #13 (2005) | A police officer who works for the Chicago Police Department. | |
| Gilbert Wiles | | Captain Universe/Hulk #1 (2005) | A scientist who was revealed to have been possessed circa 1983. | |
| Daredevil | Matthew Murdock | Captain Universe/Daredevil #1 (2005) | He was once possessed by the Enigma Power. | |
| X-23 | Laura Kinney | Captain Universe/X-23 #1 (2005); X-23 #16 (2011) | Both first mutant and first clone to become Captain Universe. Told by the Enigma Force she is the future heir to its power. | |
| Invisible Woman | Susan Storm-Richards | Captain Universe/Invisible Woman #1 (2005) | | |
| Gladiator | Kallark | Captain Universe/Invisible Woman #1 (2005) | First Shi'ar to become Captain Universe. | |
| Krosakis | | Captain Universe/Silver Surfer #1 (2005) | Krosakis is an alien with the power to absorb the life energy of other creatures and even absorbed the Enigma Power at some point. | |
| Silver Surfer | Norrin Radd | Captain Universe/Silver Surfer #1 (2005) | Silver Surfer became possessed by the Enigma Power to defeat Krosakis. | |
| Gabriel Vargas | | Captain Universe/Silver Surfer #1 (2005) | A discharged Marine of the United States Marine Corps who was wounded in action and was honorably discharged. Gabriel is killed by Blastaar sometime after the Uni-Power leaves him. | |
| William Nguyen | | The Amazing Spider-Man #627-#629 (2010) | A man who was possessed by the Uni-Power and planned revenge on Juggernaut for ruining his life. | |
| Juggernaut | Cain Marko | The Amazing Spider-Man #629 (2010) | Juggernaut became possessed by the Uni-Power to repair the tectonic plates when William Nguyen was unable to do the job. | |
| Tamara Devoux | | Avengers (vol. 5) #1-44 (2012), | An African-American woman who was hurt in a car crash. At the time of the crash, her young daughter Ella was in the car. Tamara had been in a coma for 10 years. The Uni-Power (Enigma Force) sought out Tamara because she was dying as it was dying as well. | |
| The Phalanx | Phalanx Drone | Annihilation: Conquest - Star-Lord #4 (2014) | First Techno-Organic organism to hold the Uni-Power. | |
| Deadpool | Wade Wilson | Deadpool vs Thanos #4 (Oct. 2015) | Deadpool became possessed by the Uni-Power during a fight with Thanos towards the end of the issue. He uses the Uni-Power to defeat Thanos, thus saving the universe and its embodiment Eternity. | |
| Spider-Man | Miles Morales | Spider-Geddon #5 (Dec. 2018) | During a multi-dimensional battle against the Inheritors, the Spider-Men summoned the Enigma Force to aid them in their fight. The Enigma Force chose to make Miles Morales the new Captain Universe, which he used to help defeat them. The Enigma Force left him after the battle was won. | |
| Venom | Edward Brock | King in Black #5 (Feb. 2021) | During Knull's full-scale invasion on Earth, the Enigma Force is unable to enter Earth, due to Knull blocking the planet's sky. However, with the help from Silver Surfer, Enigma Force successfully enters Earth and chose to make Eddie Brock the new Captain Universe, which he used to help defeat Knull. The Enigma Force left him after the battle was won, leaving Eddie to finish the remaining duties. | |

=== Other realities ===
| Character | Real Name | Possessed in | Notes |
|---|---|---|---|
| Aunt May | May Reilly Parker | Fantastic Four Roast #1 (1982) | Oldest Human ever to become Captain Universe. |
| Spider-Ham | Peter Porker | Marvel Tales #236 (1990) | Becomes Captain Zooniverse, a pig-like variation of Captain Universe. |
| Quasar | Wendell Vaughn | What If? (vol. 2) #25 (1991) | Became possessed by the Enigma Power in the story that tells what happened if Father Set had come to Earth. |
| Casey | | What If? (vol. 2) #31 (1991) | A dog who was the first known animal Captain Universe. |
| Doctor Doom | Doombot | What If? (vol. 2) #31 (1991) | Proof that robots can't wield the Uni-Power. |
| Captain Marvel | Mar-Vell | Earth X #X (2000) | |
| Unnamed Male Host | ?? | Universe X #0 (2000) | Fought Thanos during the Infinity Gauntlet Saga, 1991. |
| Unnamed Male Host | ?? | Fantastic Four Annual 2001 (2001) | |
| Mister Fantastic | Reed Richards | Paradise X #X (2003) | |
| Death's Head 3.0 | | Amazing Fantasy #16 (2005) | Uses the Alias-Power, a clone of the Uni-Power, as a power source. |
| The Captain | | Nextwave: Agents of H.A.T.E. #10 (2006) | Dream induced by Forbush Man. |

== Reception ==
=== Critical reception ===
Jasmine Shanelle of The Mary Sue included Captain Universe in their "6 of Marvel’s Most Powerful Women Who Have Yet to Hit the Big Screen" list. Matthew Jackson of The A.V. Club included Captain Universe in their "15 Marvel superheroes and villains we want to see in the MCU" list. Marc Buxton of Den of Geek ranked Captain Universe 11th in their "Guardians of the Galaxy 3: 50 Marvel Characters We Want to See" list. CBR.com ranked Captain Universe 1st in their "Marvel's Strongest Cosmic Heroes" list, 1st in their "Marvel Comics: The 20 Most Powerful Female Members Of The Avengers" list, and 12th in their "20 Powerful Female Marvel Characters We Hope To See In The MCU's Phase Four" list.

== Other versions ==
=== Captain Universe Initiative / Death's Head 3.0 ===
In one possible future of the Marvel Universe, Advanced Idea Mechanics has examined the Uni-Power and attempted to duplicate it with the Captain Universe Initiative. The duplicate, referred to as the 'Alias-Power' or 'Uni-Alias', has the ability to animate the Death's Head 3.0 robot. While resident in Death's Head, it took the form of Death's Head's conscience.

=== Spider-Ham becomes Captain Zooniverse ===
In the Larval Zooniverse, Spider-Ham inadvertently gains the Uni-Power during a botched experiment and becomes Captain Zooniverse. With this new power, he defeats all of his enemies and traps them in orbit around Earth.

=== What If? ===
Two alternate versions of Captain Universe appear in What If?:

- On Earth-9151, Quasar becomes the host of the Uni-Power after many other heroes and villains were killed by Set's forces. Quasar manages to subdue Set, trapping himself and Set in the Eye of Agamotto.
- On Earth-91110, Spider-Man is corrupted by power when the Uni-Power decides to stay with him. He ends up battling his Avengers friends when they do not agree with his methods. A confrontation with a rogue Doombot leads to a hostage being killed. Peter manages to give up the entirety of his powers, including his spider-ones. Later, Peter's child manifests a combination of Captain Universe and Spider-Man powers.

=== Captain Universe of the Law Enforcement squad ===
An unidentified alternate universe version of Captain Universe appears in Fantastic Four Annual (2001) as a member of the Law Enforcement Squad. During a battle between the Law Enforcement Squad and the Fantastic Four, Mister Fantastic convinces Captain Universe that something is out of place and that the Fantastic Four are not his enemies. Captain Universe reveals to Doctor Druid that Mister Fantastic is telling the truth. However, before he can convince the others to stop fighting, he is struck down by Nova. Mister Fantastic and Doctor Druid travel into a portal left by Captain Universe's "death", finding him to be alive within Eternity.

=== Captain Universe of Earth X ===
In Earth X, the Uni-Power bonded with Mar-Vell following the death of Arcturus Rann. The Uni-Power later bonded with Mister Fantastic to form the new Eternity.

=== Spider-Verse ===
An alternate universe version of Peter Parker from Earth-13 who retained the Enigma Force appears in Spider-Verse. He attempts to protect the other Spider-Men until he is killed by Solus.

== In other media ==
=== Video games ===
- Peter Parker / Spider-Man's Captain Universe suit appears as an alternate skin in Spider-Man (2000), Spider-Man 2: Enter Electro, and Spider-Man: Web of Shadows.
- Peter Parker / Spider-Man's Captain Universe suit, along with variations for Spider-Man Noir, Spider-Man 2099, and a black suit-empowered Ultimate Spider-Man, appear as downloadable alternate skins in Spider-Man: Shattered Dimensions.
- Peter Parker / Spider-Man's Captain Universe suit and a variation for Spider-Man 2099 appear as alternate skins in Spider-Man: Edge of Time.
- An unidentified Captain Universe appears in Lego Marvel's Avengers.
- Peter Parker / Captain Universe, referred to as Cosmic Spider-Man, appears as a playable character in Spider-Man Unlimited.

=== Merchandise ===
- In 2008, Art Asylum/Diamond Select Toys released a figure of Peter Parker / Captain Universe / Cosmic Spider-Man in the Marvel Minimates line as part of a two-pack with Venom.
- In 2010, NECA/WizKids released a HeroClix set entitled "Web of Spider-Man", which includes a figure of Peter Parker / Captain Universe / Cosmic Spider-Man.
- An unidentified Captain Universe and Peter Parker / Cosmic Spider-Man received trading cards in the Marvel VS., Marvel Overpower, the Fleer Mark Bagley Spider-Man Card Set and Fleer Ultra 1994 sets as well as a personalized X-Men/Captain Universe comic.
- In 2017, the Marvel Legends line released a figure of Peter Parker / Cosmic Spider-Man.

== Collected editions ==
| Title | Material collected | Published date | ISBN |
|---|---|---|---|
| Captain Universe: Power Unimaginable | Marvel Spotlight #9-11, Incredible Hulk Annual #10, Marvel Fanfare #25, Web Of Spider-Man Annual #5-6, Marvel Comics Presents #148, Cosmic Power Unlimited #5 | November 2005 | 978-0785118916 |
| Captain Universe: Universal Heroes | Captain Universe/Hulk, Captain Universe/Silver Surfer, Captain Universe/Daredevil, Captain Universe/Invisible Woman, Captain Universe/X-23, Amazing Fantasy (vol. 2) #13-14 | February 2006 | 978-0785118572 |
