= Yondu =

Fictional character appearing in American comic books published by Marvel Comics

- The two versions of Yondu on the variant cover for Yondu #2; Art by Alex Garner

Publication information
- Publisher: Marvel Comics
- First appearance: Marvel Super-Heroes #18 (January 1969)
- Created by: Arnold Drake; Gene Colan

In-story information
- Alter ego: Yondu Udonta
- Species: Centaurian
- Team affiliations: Guardians of the Galaxy; Avengers; Ravagers
- Abilities: Expert archer Empathic relationship with all life forms

Yondu Udonta, or simply Yondu (/ˈjɒnduː/), is a character appearing in American comic books published by Marvel Comics. The original version of the character is depicted as the last survivor of his species in the 31st century, and is a founding member of the original Guardians of the Galaxy team from the Marvel Multiverse alternate reality known as Earth-691. Yondu in Earth-691 is depicted as a spiritual warrior who can control his killing arrows via sound waves, most commonly by whistling. Yondu joined Vance Astro and other survivors of the Badoon attack on the solar system in the 31st century who became known as the Guardians of the Galaxy. As part of the Guardians, Yondu traveled to present-day Earth and became an honorary member of the Avengers.

In other media, Yondu has appeared in the Marvel Cinematic Universe, portrayed by Michael Rooker, and the Guardians of the Galaxy animated series, voiced by James Arnold Taylor. The former version is a cyborg and member of the Ravagers and was later incorporated into the comics continuity, depicted as the first Yondu's ancestor.

== Publication history ==
The Earth-691 version of Yondu first appeared in Marvel Super-Heroes #18 (January 1969), written by Arnold Drake and penciled by Gene Colan. According to Roy Thomas, all of the original Guardians of the Galaxy were created in a conference between Drake and Stan Lee, but it remains uncertain whether each individual character was created by Drake, Lee, or both. Writer Steve Gerber included the character when he revived the team in several Marvel titles: Marvel Two-In-One #4–5 (July–Sept. 1974), Giant Size Defenders #5, and Defenders #26–29 (July-Nov. 1975), and Marvel Presents #3–12 (Feb. 1976 – Aug. 1977).

Yondu appeared along with the rest of the original Guardians of the Galaxy team in the 2014 series Guardians 3000. Writer Dan Abnett described him as "the instinct" of the team.

The Earth-616 version of Yondu first appeared in Star-Lord #2 and was created by Sam Humphries and Javier Garron.

== Fictional character biography ==
=== Earth-691 ===
Yondu on the cover of Guardians of the Galaxy #44 (January 1994). Art by Steve Montano and Kevin West.

Yondu Udonta is a member of the Zatoan tribe and a Centaurian from Centauri IV. In 3006 A.D., Vance Astro, an astronaut from Earth, lands on Yondu's planet with an antiquated propulsion ship. Vance encounters Yondu during the latter's trial of manhood. Yondu attacks him, but is repelled by Vance's powers. Vance keeps this secret as Yondu's action was illegal. Yondu works with Vance when the Badoon, an alien race, overtakes the planet later that year. All the other Centaurians are believed to have been slaughtered. Vance and Yondu escape in his ship to fetch help but the Badoon capture them easily. The duo are taken to Earth which, by 3007 A.D., has also been conquered. When questioned, Vance pretends to be unfriendly with Yondu. They later escape and team up with Charlie-27 of the Jupiter colony and Martinex of the Pluto colony, forming the Guardians of the Galaxy to fight the Badoon.

For the next seven years, the four survivors attack the Badoon's outposts in the Solar System. In 3014 A.D., the Guardians team up with the time-traveling Thing, Captain America, and Sharon Carter to retake New York City from the Badoon forces. In 3015 A.D., the Guardians time-travel to the 20th century. They later return to 3015 A.D. with the Defenders and meet Starhawk. After humanity defeats the Brotherhood of Badoon occupiers, the Sisterhood of Badoon arrive and remove the males from Earth.

Yondu and the Guardians team up with the time-traveling Thor, and battle Korvac and his Minions of Menace. Yondu travels to the present alongside his fellow Guardians, and assists the Avengers against Korvac. In 3017 A.D., Yondu and the Guardians go on a quest to find the lost shield of Captain America. They battle Taserface and the Stark, and defeat the Stark. Yondu's right hand is later destroyed by Interface, and replaced by Martinex with a bionic appendage. Yondu later leaves the team when it is revealed that a small enclave of his people have survived on Centauri IV. These Kikaahe ("cave dwellers") escaped death at the hands of the Badoon because the walls of the cavern where they lived contained the mineral trillite ("yaka") which blocks radio waves, thereby shielding them from sensors. Since his newfound people will not accept his bionic hand, Yondu allows the Guardians to restore his hand with their technology. During their farewells, Vance apologizes for what he had thought was unacceptable treatment of Yondu during their earlier adventurers.

=== Earth-616 ===
The Earth-616 version of Yondu has been identified by writer Sam Humphries as "the great, great, great, great, great, great, great grandfather of the Yondu in the original Guardians of the Galaxy and Guardians 3000." In this reality, Yondu is the leader of the Ravagers, a group of space pirates. Yondu finds Peter Quill when his ship malfunctions and strands him in space. After the Ravagers save Peter, he tries to steal their ship, managing to outsmart every member of the crew and capturing Yondu. After Yondu frees himself from his restraints and attacks Peter, he gives him a choice between letting himself be released into space without more trouble or execution. Peter instead asks to join his crew. Yondu is initially skeptical of this idea, but after he learns Peter, like him, is a homeless orphan, Yondu allows him to stay on the ship with the Ravagers as their cleaning boy. Peter uses the opportunity to learn everything he can from space. Later, Yondu makes him an official Ravager.

== Powers and abilities ==
Yondu is a Centaurian, a humanoid alien with physiology akin to Earth marsupials. He possesses a degree of enhanced strength and durability as well as an intuitive mystical "sixth sense" perception that permits him limited empathic relationships with other lifeforms. The higher the lifeform, the more limited is his empathic potential. Additionally, Yondu possesses an intuitive rapport with nature, particularly that of Centauri. With this rapport, he can sense incongruous elements (foreign bodies or substances) or focus on specific elements within the whole (such as the location of a plant). He is also sensitive to mystical beings and forces and is able to detect their presence and activities without effort. Yondu is able to replenish his own inner strength by going into a trance and communing with natural forces.

As a hunter, Yondu is an expert in the use of bow and arrow. His ability to whistle with a range of four octaves aids his archery. He is a skilled hand-to-hand combatant, and a skilled hunter and tracker.

=== Equipment ===
Yondu uses a 5-foot (1.5 m) single curve bow and a quiver of arrows composed of yaka, a metal found only on Centauri IV. His yaka arrows are able to change their trajectory in response to certain high-octave whistles produced by him.

Yondu's right hand is replaced for a time by a bionic device called a weapons concealment appendage, a metal cup replacing his right hand. Thus, he could no longer practice archery nor perform functions requiring him to grasp with his right hand. The device can release a number of weapons, including a mace, a hatchet, a scythe, a barbed spear, and others; when not in use the weapons are concealed within the appendage at a reduced size, until enlarged by Pym particles. Yondu's bionic weapon-hand is later replaced with a duplicate of his original hand.

== In other media ==
=== Television ===
- Yondu, based on the MCU incarnation (see below), appears in Guardians of the Galaxy (2015), voiced by James Arnold Taylor.
- Yondu appears in Lego Marvel Super Heroes - Guardians of the Galaxy: The Thanos Threat, voiced again by James Arnold Taylor.

=== Marvel Cinematic Universe ===
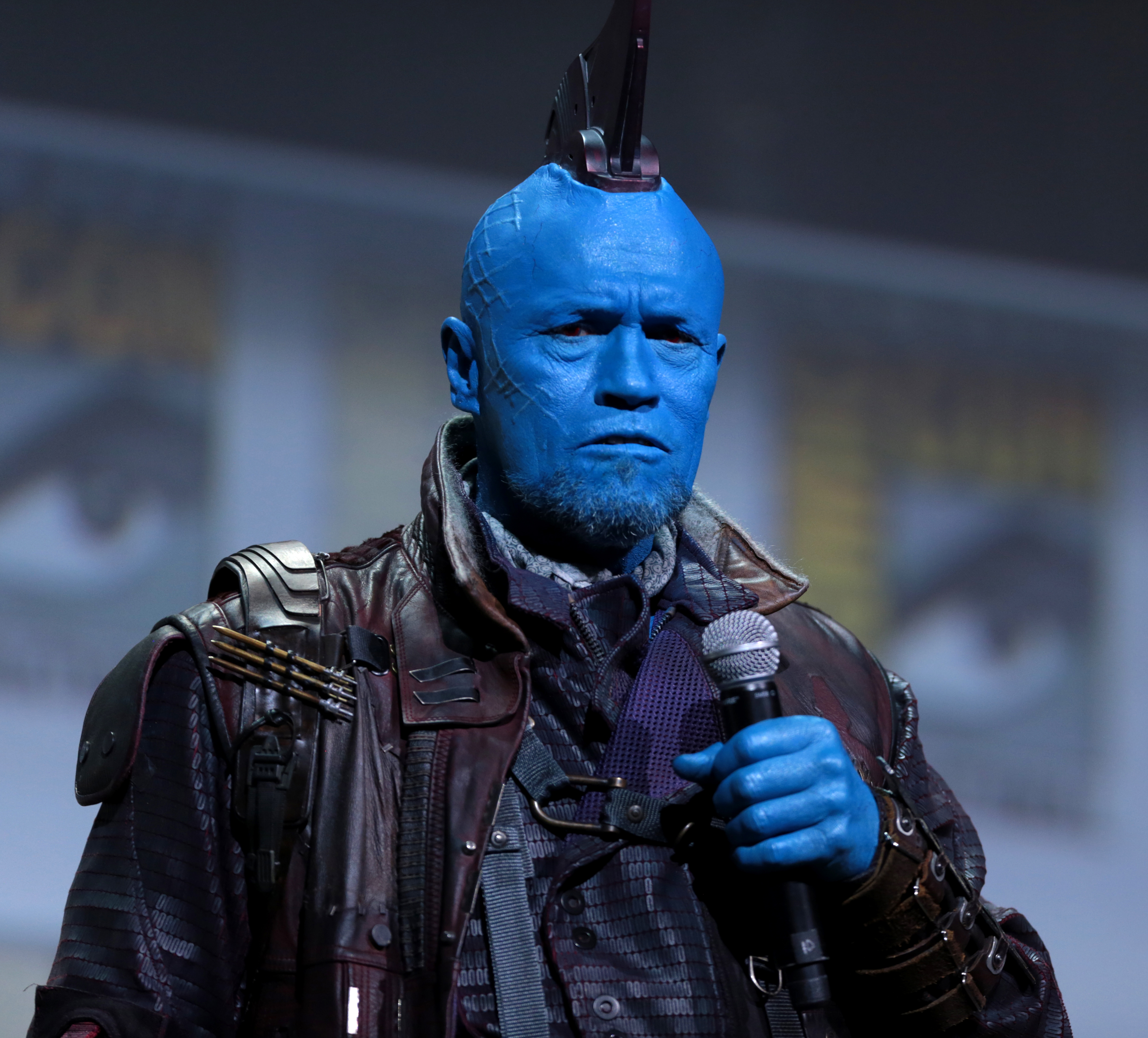
Michael Rooker as Yondu at the 2016 San Diego Comic-Con.

Yondu Udonta appears in media set in the Marvel Cinematic Universe (MCU), portrayed by Michael Rooker. This version is a cyborg space pirate whose Yaka arrow is controlled by a head-mounted fin in addition to whistling. Additionally, he is the leader of one of several Ravager factions.

- Udonta first appears in the live-action film Guardians of the Galaxy (2014). In 1988, he kidnaps a young Peter Quill on behalf of the latter's father, Ego, but chooses to raise him as a Ravager instead.
- In the live-action film Guardians of the Galaxy Vol. 2, the greater Ravager community exile Udonta and his faction after discovering they broke the Ravager code by trafficking children. Following this, Ayesha of the Sovereign hires Udonta to track down the Guardians of the Galaxy in retaliation for Rocket stealing their amulax batteries. Udonta and his Ravagers capture Rocket and Groot. However, when he announces his intent to renege on the deal, Taserface launches a mutiny, captures him, and executes all of Udonta's loyalists while Nebula destroys his control fin. With Rocket, Groot, and Kraglin Obfonteri's help, Udonta secures a prototype fin to kill the mutineers before escaping to help Quill and the other Guardians defeat Ego. Amidst this, Udonta sacrifices himself to save Quill, having grown to see him as a son. At Udonta's funeral, Quill declares him his real father while Rocket informs the other Ravagers of Udonta's redemption and Kraglin inherits the Yaka arrow.
- Alternate timeline variants of Udonta appear in the Disney+ animated series What If...?, voiced by Rooker.
- Udonta appears in animated flashback sequences in the live-action television special The Guardians of the Galaxy Holiday Special.
- A vision of Udonta makes a cameo appearance in the live-action film Guardians of the Galaxy Vol. 3.

=== Video games ===
- Yondu appears as a playable character in Disney Infinity 2.0, voiced by Chris Edgerly.
- Yondu appears as a playable character in Marvel: Future Fight.
- Yondu appears in Marvel Avengers Alliance 2.
- Yondu, based on the MCU incarnation, appears in Lego Marvel Super Heroes 2. Additionally, his mainstream comics counterpart appears as part of the "Classic Guardians of the Galaxy" DLC pack.
- Yondu appears in Guardians of the Galaxy: The Telltale Series, voiced by Mark Barbolak. This version has history with Peter Quill and Rocket Raccoon. In a flashback in episode one, Quill recalls Yondu claiming that his mother told the latter to watch over him. If Quill trusts Yondu, he agrees to go with him. If Quill does not, Yondu will forcibly drag the former to his new home. In episode two, the Guardians of the Galaxy enlist Yondu to help repair their starship, the Milano. If the player chooses not to join Rocket in traveling to Halfworld, the latter will steal Yondu's ship, leading to Yondu accompanying the Guardians.
- Yondu appears as a playable character in Marvel Contest of Champions.
- Yondu appears as a playable character in Marvel Puzzle Quest.

== Collected editions ==
Title	Material collected	Published date	ISBN
Yondu: My Two Yondus	Yondu #1-5	July 2020	978-1302921095
