= Badoon =

Fictional species in Marvel Comics

- A group of Badoon Hunters led by their leader Brother Royal. Interior artwork from X-Men Annual 5 (1981) Art by Brent Anderson.

Publication information
- Publisher: Marvel Comics
- First appearance: Silver Surfer #2 (October 1968)
- Created by: Stan Lee (writer); John Buscema (artist)

Characteristics
- Place of origin: Moord (males); Lotiara (females)
- Notable members: Kang the Conqueror, Brother Royal, Tolaria

The Badoon are a fictional reptilian alien species appearing in American comic books published by Marvel Comics. The Badoon Exfulgence are notable for living under strict gender segregation, resulting in two separate societies; the Brotherhood of Badoon (ruled by a "Brother Royal") and the Sisterhood of Badoon (ruled by a Queen).

The Brotherhood live on the planet Moord in the Lomora star system, in the Milky Way, while the Sisterhood reside on the Badoon homeworld of Lotiara (Capella II, also known as "Swampworld"), 42.2 light years from Earth.

== Publication history ==
The Badoon first appeared in Silver Surfer #2 (October 1968) and were created by Stan Lee and John Buscema.

== Fictional history ==
Female Badoon from The Defenders #28 (October 1975). Art by Sal Buscema.

The Badoon Exfulgence is older than the Kree and the Skrulls. There was a natural hatred between the two genders, and they fought each other in long gender wars. The males won and placed the weaker females in captivity. In time, the males further developed technology and abandoned Lotiara, returning only when their mating drive made it necessary. The males became conquerors of worlds, while the females became pacifists, content to remain in peace on their homeworld and ignorant of the males' star-spanning empire. In their original depiction, the Badoon were responsible for the massacre of the Zen-Whoberi, Gamora's species.

At the time of the Annihilation Wave, the Badoon control 37.7% of the Milky Way Galaxy. Despite this, the Badoon are considered a minor species. The time traveler Major Victory warn the Guardians of the Galaxy that they need to take the Badoon seriously, as they will soon become the greatest military threat in the galaxy.

The Inhumans and the Kree form an alliance with the Badoon alongside the Centaurians, the Dire Wraiths, and the Kymellians. They are given small amounts of Amphogen, a mutagenic substance, as part of an experimental procedure that prevents them from being harmed by Terrigen Mist.

== Technology ==
The Monster of Badoon as depicted in X-Men Annual #5 (1981). Art by Brent Anderson.

The Brotherhood are capable of faster-than-light space travel and also possess personal cloaking technology. They employ a hand-held particle gun called the "basic weapon." Although males typically wear minimal clothing, some soldiers wear an explosive "frag-thong" that destroys approximately ten surrounding enemies once a Badoon is shot down.

There is also a large, muscular cyborg-like being sometimes used in personal combat called the Monster of Badoon. The Badoon will bolster their forces with Zom soldiers: the corpses of victims turned into cyborg warriors. They are known to use Saturnian Hound-Hawks in the 31st century.

== Known Badoon ==
- Aladi Ko Eke - Queen of the Badoon contingent of Universal Inhumans.
- Brother Royal - Ruler of the Brotherhood of the Badoon. He commands the Monster of Badoon.
- Czar-Doon - A Badoon who worked with Thanos. He is a former member of Yondu's Ravagers.
- Dara Ko Eke - The daughter of Queen Aladi Ko Eke, Dara is a member of the Universal Inhumans' Light Brigade. She operates under the alias of All-Knowing.
- Drang - A Badoon leader in the 31st century.
- Droom - Brother Royal of the Badoon Exfulgence in the 31st century.
- Durge - Badoon of the 31st century, who attempted to reconquer Earth by broadcasting "Realitee-Vee" and addicting its inhabitants.
- Master Ecallaw - The last member of the Intergalactic Alliance of Earth-93112. He mentored Maxam and Zhang to time-travel and kill Adam Warlock, to stop the Magus.
- Frack - Bounty Hunter on Knot's crew. Twin brother of Frick.
- Frick - Bounty Hunter on Knot's crew. Twin brother of Frack.
- Knot - Criminal Bounty Hunter who attempted to gain the Mandalay Gem from an orphanage, but was sucked into the void of space where he probably met his end.
- Kodor - Badoon bounty hunter who trailed the mass murdering Cazon to Earth. He teamed up, with She-Hulk and Jazinda, to convict him.
- Koord - Governor of Earth, during its occupation in the 31st century. He was killed by Martinex.
- L'Matto - A Badoon who was one of the hosts to Captain Universe. He wielded the Enigma Power to prevent the Guardians of the Galaxy from exterminating the Badoon.
- L’Wit - The daughter of the Brother Royal.
- Manat - Ambassador Manat represented the Brotherhood in the Intergalactic Council.
- Maul - Badoon soldier who invaded Jupiter.
- Maz - Badoon soldier who invaded Jupiter.
- Mud-Ah - A member of Sandorr's Hunters, bounty hunters who attempted to capture the Inhumans. He, along with most of the group of hunters, was killed while retreating.
- Muer - Soldier, of the Badoon Plutonian invading force, in the 31st century.
- Thumbnail - Mercenary thug who followed Knot as his muscle, they attempted to gain the Mandalay Gem when they probably met their end.
- Tiberius - A Badoon orphan who was held captive by his own people. He was freed by Star-Lord.
- Tolaria - Leader of the Sisterhood in the 31st century.
- Voord Bloodeye - Badoon Deity, the god of Beheadings who was killed by Gorr the God Butcher about 500 years ago.
- Y’Gaar - Current Brother Royal of the Badoon Exfulgence.
- Yur - Badoon of the 31st century who attempted to capture Charlie-27 on Pluto.

== Other versions ==
=== Earth-691 ===
The Brotherhood are most closely associated with the Guardians of the Galaxy's 'Multiverse' timeline of Earth-691. In this reality, Earth fought a war with the Badoon in the 30th century until both Earth and its solar system colonies were conquered in the year 3007, and many races were nearly all wiped out. The Guardians of the Galaxy were made up of different species, and put together by Starhawk. The human Michael Korvac joined the Badoon and became a cyborg. The Solar System was liberated by the intervention of the Sisterhood in 3014.

=== Earth-93112 ===
In the Earth-93112 timeline, the Badoon Ecclaw was one of the last survivors of the Intergalactic Alliance destroyed by the Magus.

=== Avengers Forever ===
In another timeline, the Badoon were conquered by Kang.

== In other media ==
A Badoon makes a cameo appearance in the X-Men: The Animated Series episode "The Dark Phoenix, Part IV: The Fate of the Phoenix".
