= Martinex =

American comic book character

- Martinex as depicted in Guardians 3000 #2 (November 2014). Art by Gerardo Sandoval (penciller/inker) and Edgar Delgado (colorist).

Publication information
- Publisher: Marvel Comics
- First appearance: Marvel Super-Heroes #18 (January 1969)
- Created by: Arnold Drake; Gene Colan

In-story information
- Alter ego: Martinex T'Naga
- Species: Pluvian
- Team affiliations: Guardians of the Galaxy; Avengers; Galactic Guardians
- Abilities: Superhuman strength, stamina, durability, and vision; Thermokinesis; Vacuum adaptation

Martinex T'Naga is a character appearing in American comic books published by Marvel Comics. The character is depicted as being from an alternate future in the 31st century, and member of the Guardians of the Galaxy.

His first appearance was in Marvel Super-Heroes #18, published January 1969.

Michael Rosenbaum played Martinex in the Marvel Cinematic Universe films Guardians of the Galaxy Vol. 2 (2017) and Guardians of the Galaxy Vol. 3 (2023).

== Publication history ==
Martinex first appeared in Marvel Super-Heroes #18 (Jan. 1969) as part of the Guardians of the Galaxy. According to Roy Thomas, all of the original Guardians of the Galaxy were created in a conference between Arnold Drake and Stan Lee, but it remains uncertain whether each individual character was created by Drake, Lee, or both. The team was featured in several Marvel titles: Marvel Two-In-One #4-5 (July-Sept. 1974), Giant Size Defenders #5, and The Defenders #26-29 (July-Nov. 1975), and writer Steve Gerber included the character when he revived the team in Marvel Presents #3-#12 (Feb. 1976-Aug. 1977).

Martinex's appearance was redesigned in Guardians of the Galaxy #7 (Dec. 1990). Writer/artist Jim Valentino commented, "No one could draw [Martinex] the same way twice. It was impossible and it was a pain in the butt. What I did was streamline him according to the planes in the body that Andrew Loomis delineated in his seminal book, Figure Drawing for All It's Worth."

Martinex appeared along with the rest of the original Guardians of the Galaxy team in the 2014 series Guardians 3000. Writer Dan Abnett described him as "the brain" of the team.

== Fictional character biography ==
Martinex is a resident of Pluto in the 31st century, descended from African human colonists. He and other Pluvians were genetically engineered to possess durable crystal skin and withstand Pluto's intense conditions. Martinex became the last surviving Pluvian after the Badoon attacked Pluto, as he had been working on Pluto's moon Charon at the time. After being secretly manipulated by Starhawk, Martinex joins forces with Vance Astro, Charlie-27, and Yondu to fight the Badoon as the Guardians of the Galaxy.

The Guardians later teamed with the time-traveling Thing, Captain America, and Sharon Carter to retake New York City from Badoon forces. Martinex and the Guardians then time-traveled to the 20th century and met the Defenders. They returned to the future with Starhawk and the Defenders and defeated the Badoon.

Eventually, the Guardians drove the Badoon from Earth's solar system and Martinex became the team's reluctant leader for a time. The Guardians departed post-war Earth on a space mission, and met Nikki who joined the Guardians of the Galaxy, and they visited the Asylum planet. The Guardians then teamed with a time-traveling Thor, and battled Korvac and his Minions of Menace. Martinex and the Guardians traveled to the present era, and assisted the Avengers in battle against Korvac. He attended an Avengers membership meeting but left soon afterwards.

While looking for the shield of Captain America, the Guardians came into conflict with Taserface and the Stark. They also encountered Firelord and defeated the Stark. The Guardians then battled a team of superhumans known as Force, and Martinex was mortally injured by the member of Force known as Brawl. Much of the crystals that covered Martinex's body were shattered, but Martinex recovered with the help of fellow Guardian Starhawk. All of the exterior crystals on Martinex fell away, leaving Martinex with a new crystalline appearance, one that was less faceted, and somewhat purple in tone. The Guardians then located Haven, a lost colony of Earth founded by mutants, where they battled Rancor and her lieutenants.

Eventually, Martinex left the team to form a larger version of the Guardians, known as the Galactic Guardians. This team was summoned to help rescue an imperiled planet full of innocents. The Galactic Guardians were initially made up of alternate future versions of Wonder Man, Firelord, Vision, Phoenix, and Ghost Rider. They had further adventures in their own limited series. Martinex later returns to the Guardians of the Galaxy.

== Powers and abilities ==
Martinex is a member of the genetically engineered human colonists whose traits were designed for survival under the cold conditions of the dwarf planet Pluto. He possesses enhanced strength, stamina, and durability. His skin is made of an organic silicon crystal. Martinex has the ability to convert bodily energy into laser-like beams that he can manipulate the temperature of. He could even withstand all conventional forms of injury. Martinex must rest and replenish his powers after using them at maximum output for a half-hour.

Martinex possesses expertise in various areas of 31st century technology, including physics and engineering.

== Other versions ==
Martinex 5, a composite character based on Martinex and DC Comics character Brainiac 5, appears in the Amalgam Comics one-shot Spider-Boy Team-Up.

== In other media ==
- Martinex appears in films set in the Marvel Cinematic Universe (MCU), portrayed by Michael Rosenbaum. This version is a member of Stakar Ogord's Ravagers.
- Martinex appears as a playable character in Lego Marvel Super Heroes 2 via the "Classic Guardians of the Galaxy" DLC.
