= Vance Astro =

- Vance Astro. Art by Paul Pelletier.

Publication information
- Publisher: Marvel Comics
- First appearance: Marvel Super-Heroes #18 (Jan. 1969)
- Created by: Arnold Drake; Gene Colan

In-story information
- Alter ego: Vance Astro (legally changed from Vance Astrovik)
- Species: Human mutant
- Team affiliations: Guardians of the Galaxy (future); U.S. Air Force; Avengers; Guardians of the Galaxy (modern day)
- Notable aliases: Major Victory
- Abilities: Psychokinesis; Skilled hand-to-hand combatant; Expert leader and strategist; Expert astronaut and pilot; Skilled athlete

Vance Astro, born Vance Astrovik and going by the code name Major Victory, is a superhero appearing in American comic books published by Marvel Comics. The character is usually depicted as being from the Earth-691 timeline of the Marvel Universe.

Astro first appeared in January 1969 as a founding member of the Guardians of the Galaxy in the partial reprint title Marvel Super-Heroes with issue #18.

Vance Astro is a mutant who possesses a psychokinetic ability, limited to projecting concussive blasts.

== Publication history ==
Vance Astro first appeared as a founding member of the Guardians of the Galaxy. According to Roy Thomas, all of the Guardians of the Galaxy were created in a conference between Arnold Drake and Stan Lee, but it remains uncertain whether each individual character was created by Drake, Lee, or both. The Guardians of the Galaxy debuted in the partial reprint title Marvel Super-Heroes with issue #18 (Jan. 1969), written by Drake and penciled by Gene Colan. After five years' absence, he was revived in several Marvel titles: Marvel Two-In-One #4-5 (July-Sept. 1974), Giant Size Defenders #5, and The Defenders #26-29 (July-Nov. 1975), all written by Steve Gerber. In each case, other heroes such as Captain America, the Thing, and the Defenders aid Astro and the Guardians against the alien Badoon. The first story established that if Vance Astro's containment suit were breached, he would age 1,000 years in a second. This drew numerous queries from readers, and the letters page in Marvel Two-in-One #7 responded by stating that Vance feeds and defecates intravenously. The Guardians were also featured in Marvel Presents #3-12 (Feb. 1976-Aug. 1977), mostly by Gerber but concluded by Roger Stern.

This was followed by a series of appearances in Thor Annual #6 (1977), The Avengers #167-177 (Jan.-Nov. 1978) and #181 (March 1979), Marvel Team-Up #86 (Oct. 1979), and Marvel Two-in-One #69 (Nov. 1980). Marvel Two-in-One #69 effectively split Vance Astro into two characters, from alternate timelines: Vance Astro/Major Victory and Vance Astrovik/Marvel Boy.

In the 1990s, Astro starred in Guardians of the Galaxy, which ran for 62 issues. It was initially written and illustrated by Jim Valentino. Valentino still found Vance's containment suit a problem:

The containment suit made absolutely no sense any way you turned it. So I knew I wanted to get him out of it from the start, but I also knew it had to be a process. His relationship with Aleta, which was started very early on, was part of the process Vance had to go through. The suit, the romance, losing her, getting out of the suit, becoming the ersatz Captain America - all of it was Vance's arc on his way to becoming a hero and a leader. He had to become Major Victory before he could become Major Astro, but that's where he was heading.

Michael Gallagher commenced writing the title from issue #29 (Oct. 1992) until cancellation in July 1995.

Beginning with the second issue (June 2008) of Guardians of the Galaxy vol. 2, Astro joined a different team with the same name. He remained a member through the series' cancellation with issue 25 (April 2010), but the team disbanded after The Thanos Imperative (Dec 2010).

Vance Astro appeared along with the rest of the original Guardians of the Galaxy team in the 2014 series Guardians 3000. Writer Dan Abnett described him as "the inspirational spirit" of the team.

== Fictional character biography ==
=== Project: Starjump ===
Vance Astrovik was born in Saugerties, New York, the only son of butcher Arnold Astrovik and his wife Norma. Going into the U.S. Air Force at the age of 18, Astrovik (who changed his name to Astro when he was 21) became the youngest man to be accepted into the astronaut training program several years later. In 1988, Astro volunteered for the first crewed interstellar mission ever conducted by the United States, Project: Starjump.

His ship, Odysseus I, was not equipped for faster-than-light speed; hence the journey to Earth's nearest interstellar neighbor, a planet in the Alpha Centauri system, would take about 10 centuries. To protect him from aging, Astro was placed in suspended animation, and occasionally awakened to perform routine course adjustments. During this time, he developed psychokinetic abilities and learned to control them.

=== Arrival at Centauri IV and formation of the Guardians ===
Upon arrival, Astro learned that other humans had arrived at Centauri IV centuries earlier, having developed a faster-than-light drive since the time he left. Although they were unable to intercept his flight, the Centaurian people welcomed him as a hero. Upset at having sacrificed his life on Earth for no purpose, Astro was determined to carry out the mission to categorize the plant life he was assigned a millennium ago, even though it would now be superfluous. While engaged in a geophysical survey, he encountered Yondu, one of the humanoid natives of the planet, who attacked him, but he stopped it. He kept this secret, as it was illegal for this species to attack a colonist. When the alien Badoon attack Centauri IV, annihilating the human colony and methodically eradicating the natives, Astro and Yondu attempt to escape in Astro's ship. They were overtaken and transported to Earth, where the Badoon Leader used a device to look through Astro's mind and see his origin. There they escaped in the year 3007 A.D. and joined with two other survivors of Badoon's massacre, Charlie-27 and Martinex, to form the Guardians of the Galaxy, with himself as the leader. After liberating Earth, the Guardians set out on a random course across the galaxy, in the hopes of safeguarding freedom everywhere, and fight the Badoon conquest of Earth's solar system. It is later revealed Starhawk manipulated events to bring them together.

=== Return to the 20th century ===
Eight years later, Astro and the Guardians of the Galaxy time-traveled to the 20th century, and met the Defenders. The Guardians returned to 3015 A.D. with Starhawk and the Defenders to defeat a new Badoon invasion force.

Later, Astro and the Guardians teamed with the time-traveling Thor. They battled Korvac and his Minions of Menace. Astro then traveled to the present alongside his fellow Guardians, and assisted the Avengers in battle against Korvac.

Years later, on a trip to the present-day Marvel Universe, Astro encountered his younger self and convinced him not to join the USAF. He also accidentally awoke the younger Vance's telekinetic powers, ensuring the divergence. The younger Vance Astrovik would later join the New Warriors, first as Marvel Boy, then as Justice, and eventually became a member of the Avengers for a short time. (Because all of the Guardians of the Galaxy are honorary Avengers, Vance holds the distinction of being the only Avenger to appear twice in the roster—as himself, and as Justice.)

=== Quest for the Shield and release from containment suit ===
After returning to his own time, Astro became involved with his teammate Aleta after she was freed from her physical merger with her ex-husband Starhawk. Astro went on a quest to find the lost shield of Captain America. He battled Taserface and the Stark during the quest, and defeated the Stark. Then, after retrieving Captain America's shield, he was critically injured in a battle with a gang that based themselves on the Punisher. Vance was healed by Krugarr, Doctor Strange's former apprentice and the current Sorcerer Supreme, and was freed from his containment suit. He then adopted a costume similar to that of Captain America to go with the shield and took the name Major Victory.

Shortly thereafter, Krugarr's enchantment was removed, and Vance began to age rapidly. He was saved by a symbiotic costume, seemingly of the same species as Venom. However, it was later determined that it was not actually a life form, but engineered to respond to the wearer's biological state.

=== Discovery by Earth-616 Guardians ===
Vance is discovered encased in ice on the asteroid Hydronis by the new Guardians of the Galaxy team leader Star-Lord. Astro confirms his identity to the band of aliens and later converses with Mantis at the Guardians' home base, Knowhere. Mantis confirms to Star-Lord that Astro has been temporally displaced. The Guardians are then attacked by the Cardinals of the Universal Church of Truth.

Vance later joins this incarnation of the Guardians of the Galaxy and helps to rescue Peter Quill from Blastaar. He later joins Rocket Raccoon's team on their mission to stop the War of Kings. After Adam Warlock loses control and becomes Magus, Vance is killed when his shield is thrown back at him by Magus, opening his suit up and causing him to age rapidly. However, he is later seen to be alive, but in suspended animation and a prisoner of the Magus, along with Mantis, Phyla-Vell, Cosmo and Gamora. He later breaks free with the other Guardians (excluding Phyla-Vell - apparently slain by the revived Thanos), reuniting with the other half of the team. After Thanos is incapacitated by Star-Lord, Major Victory and all the other Guardians reunite in Knowhere. It's also revealed, during a council of the Guardians of All Galaxies - that reunites the Guardians of the whole Multiverse - that the Major Victory currently in Earth 616 is a time displaced one from an alternate, unidentified dimension. During this council, three other versions of Major Victory appear: one identical to the Earth-616 one with the original uniform, another with the symbiotic outfit of 1994-1995 and finally another with the pre-symbiotic costume appearance and the Captain America-themed uniform.

Vance later worked with a time-displaced Namorita to safeguard a mission into the 'Cancerverse', a realm threatening the known universe.

== Powers and abilities ==
Vance Astro is a mutant who possesses the psionic ability of psychokinesis, the ability to affect matter with his mind. Vance's psionic powers can only be manifested as "psyche-blasts", focused psychokinetic blasts of explosive concussive force, which can disrupt the synapses in the minds of any living being they strike. He can focus the energy at will, creating anything from a narrow 2-inch-diameter (51 mm) beam to a 360 degree expanding sphere of force. Over time, Vance has shown some marginal improvement of the control of his psychokinesis, such as generating small psionic pulses to slow the descent of falling people, or gentle psychic bursts to move objects forwards or backwards (all without inflicting any damage on the people or objects). Vance can only employ his psionic powers at maximum exertion for about a half-hour before suffering mental fatigue, after which he must replenish his store of psionic energy. During the time when he carried Captain America's shield in combat, he would use his power to propel the shield and manipulate its flight path, simulating the Captain's use of the shield as a throwing weapon. Going by the code name Hollywood, a 1,000-year-old Simon Williams's helped to augment all of Astro's abilities by a transfusion of Williams's ionically enhanced blood.

Astro is often seen wearing a copper alloy bodysuit, which preserved his body on his 1,000-year journey through space, and prevents his body from decaying when exposed to air. Vance's dependency on his suit was cured by a spell by Krugarr and the blood transfusion from Hollywood, though he wears a similar full-body suit to this day.

Astro is an above average athlete and an excellent hand-to-hand combatant, having received unarmed combat training in the U.S. Air Force in the 20th century. He is also a skilled pilot and strategist.

== Reception ==
=== Accolades ===
- In 2018, Comic Book Resources (CBR) ranked Vance Astro 3rd in their "Guardians of the Galaxy Members Through the Years" list.
- In 2020, CBR ranked Vance Astro 2nd in their "10 Of The Most Powerful Original Guardians Of The Galaxy Members" list.

== Other versions ==
Vance Astrovik is Vance Astro's present-day self, who he stopped from going into space and allowed to become a contemporary superhero.

== In other media ==
- Vance Astro appears in HeroClix.
- Vance Astro appears as a playable character in Lego Marvel Super Heroes 2 as part of the "Classic Guardians of the Galaxy" DLC.
