= Ex Nihilo (character) =

Marvel Comics fictional character

Publication information
- Publisher: Marvel Comics
- First appearance: Avengers vol. 5 #1 (December 2012)
- Created by: Jonathan Hickman; Jerome Opeña

In-story information
- Alter ego: Ex Nihilo
- Species: Gardeners
- Team affiliations: Builders; Gardeners; Avengers
- Abilities: Chlorokinesis; Organic transformation Energy blasts Pyrokinesis; Advanced longevity

Ex Nihilo is a fictional character appearing in American comic books published by Marvel Comics.

== Publication history ==
Ex Nihilo first appeared in Avengers vol. 5 #1 (December 2012) and was created by Jonathan Hickman and Jerome Opeña.

== Fictional character biography ==
Ex Nihilo is one of the Gardeners carried along with his sister Abyss as an egg by an Aleph (a species of robotic creatures created by the Builders). In accordance with their mission as creations of the Builders, Aleph taught them to transform into perfect creatures any species they encountered. Ex Nihilo, Abyss, and their Aleph arrive on Mars and terraform it to contain a breathable atmosphere and vegetation. After Ex Nihilo shoots an Origin Bomb at Earth to accelerate the evolution of mankind, the Avengers assemble a response team. Not interested in fighting, Ex Nihilo tries to accelerate Iron Man's evolution so that he no longer needs an exoskeleton. When Black Widow and Hawkeye retaliate, Ex Nihilo becomes angry and attacks them. During the brawl, Ex Nihilo, Abyss, and the Aleph defeat the Avengers and imprison them. A helpless Captain America is sent back to Earth as a message. Awakening three days later, Captain America implements the Avengers initiative called "Wake The World", prompting the team's most massive assemblage to date. Ex Nihilo and his allies battle the Avengers until they notice the presence of Captain Universe, who destroys Aleph. Before returning to Earth, the Avengers allow Ex Nihilo to reshape Mars as long as he does not interfere with Earth.

In a prelude to the Infinity storyline, Ex Nihilo, Abyss, Nightmask, and Star Brand join the Avengers. After the fight against the Builders and Thanos, Ex Nihilo joins his brethren who endeavor to recreate life on worlds ravaged by the war of the Builders.

During the Time Runs Out storyline, Ex Nihilo and his fellow Gardeners attempt to fix the decaying universe caused by the contraction of the multiverse. Once on Earth, Ex Nihilo and the Gardeners are able to see its whole system and find that Earth has scars. Sunspot offers the Gardeners a one-way trip to help his branch of the Avengers investigate the origin of this decay. Sunspot's Avengers travel across numerous universes navigating the map left by the Mapmakers. After one last jump across universes, Sunspot's Avengers branch encounter a fissure in time and space, from which two Beyonders emerge. Ex Nihilo, Abyss, and the Gardeners sacrifice themselves in an attempt to reprogram one of the Beyonders.

== Powers and abilities ==
Ex Nihilo has the power to create new life and modify existing life forms on a planetary scale like control the movement and growth of the plants and transform organic life. Ex Nihilo can also fire energy blasts, exhale fire from his mouth, and has advanced longevity.

== Other versions ==
In "What If...Thanos had joined the Avengers", Ex Nihilo appears with the Avengers fighting the Builders.

== In other media ==
Hasbro released an Ex Nihilo action figure as part of Guardians of the Galaxy Marvel Legends line.
