= Charlie-27 =

- Charlie-27 as depicted in Avengers Roll Call #1 (April 2012). Art by Gus Vazquez.

Publication information
- Publisher: Marvel Comics
- First appearance: Marvel Super-Heroes #18 (Jan. 1969)
- Created by: Arnold Drake; Gene Colan

In-story information
- Alter ego: Charlie-27
- Species: Jovian
- Team affiliations: Guardians of the Galaxy; Avengers
- Abilities: Superhuman strength, stamina, and durability

Charlie-27 is a character appearing in American comic books published by Marvel Comics. The character usually appears in the Earth-691 timeline of the Marvel Universe as a member of the original 31st century incarnation of the team known as the Guardians of the Galaxy.

Charlie-27 first appeared in Marvel Super-Heroes #18 (Jan. 1969). Writer Dan Abnett described him as "the heart" of the Guardians of the Galaxy.

The character was portrayed by actor Ving Rhames in the 2017 Marvel Cinematic Universe film Guardians of the Galaxy Vol. 2.

== Publication history ==
Charlie-27 first appeared in Marvel Super-Heroes #18 (Jan. 1969). According to Roy Thomas, all of the original Guardians of the Galaxy were created in a conference between Arnold Drake and Stan Lee, but it remains uncertain whether Drake, Lee, or both created each individual character. The team was featured in several Marvel titles: Marvel Two-In-One #4-5 (July-Sept. 1974), Giant Size Defenders #5, and The Defenders #26-29 (July-Nov. 1975), and writer Steve Gerber included the character when he revived the team in Marvel Presents #3-#12 (Feb. 1976-Aug. 1977).

Charlie-27 is a recurring character in the 1990s Guardians of the Galaxy series and appeared along with the rest of the original Guardians of the Galaxy team in the 2014 series Guardians 3000. He was also one of the characters featured in the 2016 Guardians of Infinity series.

== Fictional character biography ==
Charlie-27 is a resident of Jupiter in the 31st century, descended from human colonists who were genetically engineered to resist Jupiter's gravity. As such, he has eleven times the muscle mass of a normal human. He was also a captain in the United Lands of Earth Space Militia.

In the year 3007, he returns from a six-month space mission to find his city taken over by the Badoon. He hears a Badoon mention he is the last surviving Jovian, so he escapes in a teleporting pod to Pluto. Unknown to him, Starhawk had keyed in the location. He joins forces with Martinex, the only survivor of Pluto. The two go to Earth using the telepod and meet Yondu and Vance Astro to form the Guardians of the Galaxy, a band of freedom fighters.

Charlie-27 later discovers the space station Drydock, which the Guardians adopt as a base. Charlie-27 becomes romantically involved with Nikki before they eventually break up.

As with the rest of the team, Charlie becomes lost in space and time. They later resurface in the series Guardians 3000, a prelude to the Secret Wars event, where they are trapped in a time loop created by Adam Warlock.

== Powers and abilities ==
Charlie-27 is a member of a genetically engineered offshoot of humanity whose traits were designed for survival under the heavy gravity conditions of the planet Jupiter. He has superhuman strength, and enhanced durability and stamina.

Charlie is trained in hand-to-hand combat as a militiaman. He also has the ability to pilot most air and spacecraft of the 31st century, including the Guardians' starships such as the Freedom's Lady, Captain America I, and Captain America II.

== Reception ==
Lucas Siegel of Newsarama opined Charlie-27 as the clear inspiration for X-Men: The Last Stand version of Juggernaut.

== In other media ==
- Charlie-27 appears in Guardians of the Galaxy Vol. 2, portrayed by Ving Rhames. This version is a member of the Ravagers.
- Charlie-27 appears as a playable character in Lego Marvel Super Heroes 2 via the "Classic Guardians of the Galaxy" DLC pack.
