= Guardians of the Galaxy (1969 team) =

1969 superhero team by Marvel Comics

- Debut: Marvel Super-Heroes #18 (January 1969). Cover art by Gene Colan and Mike Esposito. (l. to r.) Vance Astro, Charlie-27, Martinex, Yondu.

Publication information
- Publisher: Marvel Comics
- First appearance: Marvel Super-Heroes #18 (January 1969)
- Created by: Roy Thomas; Arnold Drake; Gene Colan

In-story information
- Base(s): Freedom's Lady; USS Captain America
- Member(s): List of Guardians of the Galaxy members

Guardians of the Galaxy is a superhero team appearing in American comic books published by Marvel Comics. The Guardians first appear in Marvel Super-Heroes #18 (January 1969). The initial roster consisted of Vance Astro, Martinex T'Naga, Captain Charlie-27, and Yondu Udonta. Later members included Stakar Ogord, Aleta Ogord, and Nikki.

== Publication history ==
The revival iteration of the team: Guardians of the Galaxy #1 (June 1990). Cover art by Jim Valentino, including newer characters Starhawk (Stakar Ogord), Aleta Ogord, and Nikki.

Roy Thomas recounted

'Guardians of the Galaxy' started out as an idea of mine: about super-guerrillas fighting against Russians and Red Chinese who had taken over and divided the USA. I got a sort of general approval out of [editor-in-chief] Stan [Lee] (I think), and gave the idea to Arnold Drake, since I had not time to write and research it. Arnold went in for a conference with Stan, and Stan (maybe Arnold, too) decided to change it to an interplanetary situation. All the characters and situations in Guardians were created by Arnold and/or Stan.

The team first appeared in the partial reprint title Marvel Super-Heroes with issue #18 (January 1969), written by Arnold Drake and penciled by Gene Colan. Despite strong sales on this issue, the Guardians of the Galaxy would not appear again for over five years, in Marvel Two-In-One #5 (June 1974). The story's writer, Steve Gerber, liked the team enough to use them again in Giant Size Defenders #5 and The Defenders #26–29 (July–November 1975). In each case, other heroes such as Captain America, the Thing, and the Defenders aid them in their war against the alien Badoon, necessitating the liberal use of time travel in these stories.

The Guardians were finally given their own series in the existing title Marvel Presents, starting with issue #3 (February 1976). Steve Gerber, still handling the writing, reflected,

Most of the stories I was scripting were set in the present. I wanted to do something that combined the standard superhero elements with something a little different, so that I could give my imagination a bit more play. We had Dave Cockrum redesign the costumes, we created a new starship for them to pilot, and we revised the premise of the strip, so that they were no longer fighting the Badoon on Earth, and sent them off amongst the stars.

Gerber left the series after seven issues, and Roger Stern took over with Marvel Presents #10. The series was cancelled shortly afterwards due to poor sales, with the final issue being #12 (August 1977). The team then made guest appearances in Thor Annual #6 (1977), The Avengers #167–177 (January–November 1978) and #181 (March 1979), Ms. Marvel #23, Marvel Team-Up #86 (October 1979), and Marvel Two-in-One #61–63 & #69 (November 1980). Marvel Two-in-One #69 drastically changed the Guardians of the Galaxy's story; due to changes made to the past of one of the members, the future which the Guardians of the Galaxy come from and the mainstream Marvel Universe are permanently separated, becoming alternate timelines to each other. After this, the Guardians of the Galaxy were absent from published stories for over a decade.

In 1989, Marvel editor-in-chief Tom DeFalco revived the Guardians of the Galaxy in order to cash in on the popularity of the TV series Star Trek: The Next Generation. DeFalco worked out a series concept using a new team of Guardians, but when he saw a series proposal for the original team that writer/artist Jim Valentino had coincidentally been working on at the same time, he green lit Valentino's idea instead. The Guardians' first self-titled comic launched in June 1990 and ran for 62 issues ( during which they also appeared in What If . . .? vol. 2 #36. This series was initially written and illustrated by Valentino, who deliberately gave it an action-oriented, "fun" feel that stood out from the typical "grim 'n' gritty" comics of the 1990s. Though Valentino had plotted the series ahead as far as issue #50, his run was cut short when he co-founded Image Comics. Having taken on two new series and the foundation of a publication company, Valentino asked editor Craig Anderson if he could switch to just writing Guardians of the Galaxy, and in response Anderson dismissed him from the series.

With issue #29 (October 1992) Michael Gallagher commenced writing the title, and continued until its cancellation with issue #62 (July 1995). According to Kevin West, who became the penciller with issue #30 (Nov. 1992), he and Gallagher worked together closely on the series, employing the Marvel method of creation, and became good friends. A spin-off four-issue miniseries, Galactic Guardians (July–October 1994), also by Gallagher and West, appeared during this time. West explained why he did not draw the final issue of Guardians of the Galaxy:

When I heard we were getting the hook, I naturally started looking for a new job. I ended up at Malibu [Comics]. There was a hold-up getting the Guardians plot finished so by the time I got it, I had to pass because I had a Malibu deadline to meet. Arrgh. Despite any minor qualms I had, I really did enjoy working on the series.

A second volume was published in May 2008, written by Dan Abnett and Andy Lanning. The title, set in a different timeline, features a new team, drawn from participants in the Annihilation: Conquest storyline. The 1969 team made guest appearances in #12–17 and #25.

A new ongoing series starring the original Guardians, titled Guardians 3000 and written by Abnett, launched in 2014.

== Fictional team history ==
The Guardians are active in the 31st century in an alternative time-line of the Marvel Universe known as Earth-691. The original members of the team include Major Vance Astro (later known as Major Victory), an astronaut from 20th century Earth who spends a thousand years travelling to Alpha Centauri in suspended animation. He is also the future alternative universe counterpart of Vance Astrovik, the hero known as Justice.

Other original team members are Martinex T'Naga, a crystalline being from Pluto; Captain Charlie-27, a soldier from Jupiter; and Yondu Udonta, a blue-skinned "noble savage" from Centauri-IV (the fourth planet orbiting the star Alpha Centauri B). Each is apparently the last of their kind and they are forced to unite as a team against the actions of the Badoon, an alien race which attempts to conquer Earth's Solar System.

During the course of the war against the Badoon, the team gains three more members—the mysterious husband and wife duo, Starhawk and Aleta, as well as Nikki, a genetically engineered young girl from Mercury seeking excitement in her life—and travel back in time, where they encounter several of the heroes of 20th century Earth, including Captain America and the Thing.

The Guardians eventually defeat the Badoon, but soon find themselves facing a new foe called Korvac, who was in part a creation of the Badoon. After teaming with the thunder god Thor to defeat Korvac in the 31st century, the Guardians then follow Korvac to 20th century mainstream Earth, where together with the Avengers they fight a final battle.

The Guardians reappear years later and have a series of adventures in their future, with several others eventually joining the team: the Inhuman Talon, the Skrull Replica, the second Yellowjacket (alias Rita DeMara of the 20th century), and an aged Simon Williams (now called Hollywood, Man of Wonder).

Wanting to expand the Guardians to a multiple-team organization, Martinex eventually leaves to look for additional members for a second unit, the Galactic Guardians.

=== Connection to the 2008 Guardians ===
During their second mission, the team that was to become the Earth-616 incarnation of the Guardians discover a time-displaced Vance Astro in a block of ice floating in space. It is his introduction as "Major Victory of the Guardians of the Galaxy" that inspires the team to take up the name. In issues #7 and #16 of the series, it was revealed a great "error" in the present day has caused the future to be destroyed; Starhawk is constantly trying to prevent it by time travel, causing the future (and the Guardians) to be altered. Only Starhawk, who is changed with each reboot but is "one who knows" about the changes, realizes anything is different, but each change still ends in a cataclysm. In issue 17, the universe of the Guardians' future had been taken over by the Badoon, and only a small portion remained undestroyed. The Guardians sent a warning to the present day, though at the cost of the end of their own universe.

The Vance Astro of the modern-day Guardians is revealed to be a Major Victory from one of these altered futures, rather than the original. A second alternate Vance Astro appears in #17.

In #18, a third version of the Guardians' future was shown, this time led by Killraven against the Martians.

== In other media ==
- The original Guardians of the Galaxy appear as playable characters in Lego Marvel Super Heroes 2 via the "Classic Guardians of the Galaxy" DLC pack.
- The original Guardians of the Galaxy serve as inspiration for the following Guardians of the Galaxy Vol. 2 characters: Yondu Udonta, Stakar Ogord, Martinex T'Naga, Mainframe, Krugarr, Charlie-27, and Aleta Ogord. These versions are high-ranking members of the Ravagers.
  - Yondu Udonta, Stakar Ogord, Martinex T'Naga, Mainframe, and Krugarr appear in Guardians of the Galaxy Vol. 3.

== Collected editions ==
- Guardians of the Galaxy: Earth Shall Overcome (978-0785137863): Collects Marvel Super-Heroes #18, Marvel Two-in-One #4–5, Giant-Size Defenders #5, and Defenders #26–29.
- Guardians of the Galaxy: The Power of Starhawk (9780785137887): Collects Marvel Presents #3–12.
- Guardians of the Galaxy: Tomorrow's Avengers Vol. 1 (978-0785166870): Collects Marvel Super Heroes #18, Marvel Two-In-One #4–5, Giant -Size Defenders #5, Defenders #26–29, Marvel Presents 3–12
- Guardians of the Galaxy: Tomorrow's Avengers Vol. 2 (978-0785167556): Collects Thor Annual #6; Avengers #167–168, 170–177, 181; Ms. Marvel #23; Marvel Team-Up #86; Marvel Two-In-One #61–63, 69
- Guardians of the Galaxy: Quest for the Shield (0-87135-879-4): Collects Guardians of the Galaxy #1–6. Released in February, 1992.
- Guardians of the Galaxy by Jim Valentino Vol. 1 (978-0785184201): Collects Guardians of the Galaxy #1–7 and Annual #1, plus material from Fantastic Four Annual #24, Thor Annual #16 and Silver Surfer Annual #4
- Guardians of the Galaxy by Jim Valentino Vol. 2 (978-0785185635): Collects Guardians of the Galaxy #8–20
- Guardians of the Galaxy by Jim Valentino Vol. 3 (978-0785198123): Collects Guardians of the Galaxy #21–29, Annual #2, Marvel Super-Heroes #18
- Guardians of the Galaxy Classic by Jim Valentino Omnibus (978-1302904395): Collects Guardians of the Galaxy #1–29, Annual #1–2, and Marvel Super-Heroes #18, plus material from Fantastic Four Annual #24, Thor Annual #16 and Silver Surfer Annual #4
- Guardians of the Galaxy Classic: In the Year 3000 Vol. 1 (978-1302900618): Collects Guardians of the Galaxy #30–39, Annual #3, and material from Marvel Comics Present #134
- Guardians of the Galaxy Classic: In the Year 3000 Vol. 2 (978-1302902148): Collects Guardians of the Galaxy #40–50, Galactic Guardians #1–4, and material from Annual #4
- Guardians of the Galaxy Classic: In the Year 3000 Vol. 3 (978-1302904432): Collects Guardians of the Galaxy #51–62, and material from Annual #4
- Guardians 3000 Vol. 1: Time After Time (978-0785193128): Collects Guardians 3000 #1–5, and material from Guardians of the Galaxy Vol. 3 #13
- Korvac Saga: Warzones! (978-0785193135): Collects Guardians 3000 #6–8, Korvac Saga #1–4

Three Epic Collections have been released to date.

=== Epic Collection ===
#	Subtitle	Years covered	Issues collected	Writers	Artists	Pages	Released	ISBN
1	Earth Shall Overcome	1969-1977	Marvel Super-Heroes #18, Marvel Two-in-One #4-5, Giant-Size Defenders #5, Defenders #26-29, Marvel Presents #3-12, Thor Annual #6	Steve Gerber, Roger Stern	John Buscema, Al Milgrom, Don Heck	408	11 Apr 2023	978-1302950439
2	Quest For The Shield	1978-1990	Avengers #167-168, 170–177, 181; Ms. Marvel #23; Marvel Team-Up #86; Marvel Two-in-One #61-63, 69; Guardians of the Galaxy #1-6	Jim Shooter, Mark Gruenwald	Jim Valentino, George Perez, David Wenzel	496	18 Feb 2025	978-1302956417
3	Homecoming	1990-1992	Guardians Of The Galaxy #7-20, Annual #1; material from Fantastic Four Annual #24; Thor Annual #16; Silver Surfer Annual #4	Jim Valentino, Al Milgrom	Jim Valentino, Al Milgrom	504	16 Sep 2025	978-1302965181

== See also ==
- List of superhero debuts
