= Korvac =

- Korvac (center) on the cover of the trade paperback edition of Avengers: The Korvac Saga (1991). Art by George Pérez.

Publication information
- Publisher: Marvel Comics
- First appearance: Giant-Size Defenders #3 (Jan. 1975)
- Created by: Steve Gerber (writer); Jim Starlin (artist)

In-story information
- Alter ego: Michael Korvac
- Species: Cyborg
- Team affiliations: Brotherhood of Badoon; Minions of Menace
- Notable aliases: The Enemy, Jaboa Murphy
- Abilities: Brilliant computer scientist Master strategist Energy manipulation via specialized computer module Wielder of the Power Cosmic

Korvac is a fictional character appearing in American comic books published by Marvel Comics. He first appeared in Giant-Size Defenders #3 (Jan. 1975) and was created by Steve Gerber and Jim Starlin.

== Publication history ==
Korvac debuted in Giant-Size Defenders #3 (1975) with no first name given, and according to creator Gerber: "The character really was a throwaway, created for one story. And I never intended to bring him back, because, among other things, I hated the name! I still think it sounds more like a vacuum cleaner than a villain".

However, Roger Stern and Len Wein felt that Korvac, being a native of the 31st century, made a natural adversary for the Guardians of the Galaxy, and wrote a story in Thor Annual #6 (1977) which was intended to set him up in that role. The Guardians of the Galaxy's own series, Marvel Presents, was cancelled before Thor Annual #6 was published, cutting off Stern's plans to use Korvac there. Korvac instead appeared in Avengers #167, 168, 170–177 (January–November 1978), later called the "Korvac Saga". The issues in this storyline were written by Jim Shooter and David Michelinie, with art by George Pérez and David Wenzel.

A trade paperback edition reprinted the Korvac Saga in 1991, and included a new epilogue written by Mark Gruenwald and drawn by Tom Morgan. Although the revised conclusion cast Korvac as a villain, it was removed by editor Tom Brevoort when reprinted as Avengers Legends Volume 2: The Korvac Saga in 2003.

Korvac reappeared briefly in Avengers Annual #16 (1987). He is heavily referenced in a 1991 summer annual crossover storyline: Fantastic Four Annual #24 (1991); Thor Annual #16 (1991); Silver Surfer Annual #4 (1991) and Guardians of the Galaxy Annual #1 (1991). The character returned in Captain America vol. 3, #17–19 (May–July 1999).

Korvac also appeared in both volumes of the alternate universe title What If?, in issues #32 (April 1982) and vol. 2, issue #36 (April 1992). Korvac made a return to the mainstream 616 universe in Avengers Academy #11 (March 2011).

In December 2010, a condensed retelling of the Korvac Saga titled Captain America: The Korvac Saga was released as a tie-in to Captain America: The First Avenger.

== Fictional character biography ==
Michael Korvac is a computer technician in the alternate universe Earth-691. When the Solar System and its colonies are conquered by the alien Badoon in AD 3007, Korvac becomes a collaborator and traitor to the human race. Caught asleep at a machine while working, the Badoon punish Korvac by grafting his upper body to a machine, effectively making him a cyborg. Korvac is then transported through time by the Elder of the Universe the Grandmaster, who utilizes him as a pawn in battling the hero Doctor Strange and the Defenders.

It is eventually revealed that Korvac deliberately lost the fight so he is able to discreetly scan and analyze the Grandmaster's cosmic power. Gaining several new abilities from this analysis, Korvac then kills his Badoon masters and plans to conquer the cosmos. Korvac recruits a group of aliens called the "Minions of Menace" and attempts to cause Earth's Sun to go nova, but is defeated by the Guardians of the Galaxy and a time-traveling Thor.

During "The Korvac Saga" storyline, Korvac flees across time and space to Earth-616. Upon arrival, Korvac discovers the space station of the entity Galactus. While attempting to download the knowledge of Galactus from the station into his own system, Korvac is imbued with the Power Cosmic and becomes god-like. Korvac then recreates himself as a perfect humanoid form, and posing as a human called "Michael", travels to Earth with the intent of reshaping it into a utopia. Korvac is pursued by the Guardians of the Galaxy, who join forces with the superhero team the Avengers in a bid to stop the villain.

Guardian member Starhawk finds Korvac and battles him in secret. Korvac, however, disintegrates Starhawk and then recreates him, but removes from the hero the ability to perceive Korvac in any way so as to avoid future detection. The Elder of the Universe known as the Collector foresees the coming of two beings that would be capable of challenging the Elders (Korvac and Thanos), and remakes his own daughter Carina into a being of incredible power to use as a weapon against them. Carina does meet Korvac, but the two fall in love and she begins to sympathize with him. The Collector is defeated by the Avengers after a failed bid to "collect" and protect the heroes from Korvac, who upon discovering the Collector's plot disintegrates the Elder.

Iron Man eventually tracks Korvac to a residential neighborhood in Forest Hills Gardens, in Queens, New York City, New York. The entire Avengers roster, aided by the heroine Ms. Marvel, and the Guardians of the Galaxy, confront Korvac and Carina, who pose as a middle-class couple. Korvac's deception is revealed when Starhawk states he cannot see the man called "Michael". Realizing that he has been discovered, and that cosmic entities such as Odin and the Watcher are now aware of his existence, Korvac is forced into battle.

Korvac slays wave after wave of heroes, and is finally caught off guard and weakened by Captain America and Wonder Man. Although able to kill the heroes, Korvac is weakened further by the combined efforts of Starhawk, Iron Man, the Vision and Thor. Sensing that Carina now doubts him, Korvac commits suicide through an act of will. An angered Carina attacks the surviving heroes, but is finally killed by Thor. The entire battle is watched by part-time Avenger Moondragon, who realizes that Korvac only wanted to help mankind, with his dying act being to restore the Avengers and Guardians to life.

"The Korvac Quest" storyline reveals that Korvac discarded his power when near death after sensing that Galactus had activated the weapon the Ultimate Nullifier in retaliation for his previous intrusion. Korvac's suicidal act of will preserves his power and consciousness, which is sent forward through time to inhabit various descendants of his. Starhawk becomes aware of this, and the Guardians of the Galaxy pursue Korvac's essence through time. The power eventually reaches the year 2977 AD and inhabits Michael's father, Jordan, who is killed in battle with the Guardians. Jordan's widow, Myra, vows to teach the infant Michael that the Guardians were responsible for his father's death on the day of his birth.

Korvac is briefly resurrected in human form by the Grandmaster to battle Silver Surfer. When Korvac's attempt to use Captain America in a scheme to steal the power of a Cosmic Cube from Red Skull ultimately failed, Red Skull uses his internalized Cube power to scatter Korvac across six dimensions.

In Avengers Academy, Korvac's wife Carina is mistakenly resurrected by Veil (believing that she is helping to resurrect Wasp). Korvac returns for her and Hank Pym offers to return Carina to Korvac, but she refuses to go with him, choosing nonexistence over him (even though she is apparently immortal, as is her father). A battle commences pitting Korvac against all current Avengers teams. He is weakened by them and then attacked by adult versions of the Academy's students. After a brutal battle, Veil phases into his body, which temporarily paralyzes Korvac, and Hazmat annihilates him with anti-matter.

Korvac is later obtained by the Enclave, who give him the code name of Adam IV. The Enclave intend to use Korvac in their plans for world domination, but he escapes from them.

One year later, Korvac assumes the alias of scientist Fuller Tiehard and battles Iron Man. The two enter a transmutation chamber and gain cosmic powers before Korvac is subdued by the universe's Abstract Entities.

== Powers and abilities ==
Korvac was originally a normal man until the Badoon amputated the lower half of his body and grafted his upper body and nervous system onto a specialized computer module capable of siphoning energy from virtually any source. Korvac's mechanical module could also tap and synthesize any form of energy and concealed advanced weaponry. After downloading information from Galactus' ship and acquiring the Power Cosmic, Korvac is capable of energy projection, matter alteration, teleportation, astral projection, and manipulation of time and space. In his human form, Korvac retained all his cosmic abilities and could use these to achieve virtually any effect. Michael Korvac is also a brilliant computer scientist, a master strategist, and a formidable hand-to-hand combatant.

== In other media ==
=== Television ===
- Michael Korvac appears in a self-titled episode of The Avengers: Earth's Mightiest Heroes, voiced by Troy Baker. This version is a contemporary human who gained powers from the Kree after they abducted and experimented on him. While being pursued by the Guardians of the Galaxy, Korvac crash-lands on Earth and is taken to Avengers Mansion to receive help from the Avengers. However, he attacks them and the Guardians before his wife Corrina shows fear and doubt about his actions, leading him to disappear.
- Korvac appears in the Ultimate Spider-Man episode "Guardians of the Galaxy", voiced by James Marsters. This version is an intergalactic warlord and leader of the Chitauri.
- Korvac appears in the Guardians of the Galaxy episode "Unfortunate Son", voiced by Wil Wheaton. This version is an alien scientist who was in love with the A.I. Rora until she was taken by J'son and turned himself into an A.I. system for his space station. After mistaking him for J'son, Korvac kidnaps Star-Lord and the Guardians of the Galaxy, intending to enslave them. However, Star-Lord helps the captives escape while Rora destroys Korvac's space station.

=== Video games ===
- Michael Korvac appears as a playable character in Lego Marvel's Avengers.
- Michael Korvac appears in Lego Marvel Super Heroes 2.
