= Starhawk (character) =

- Starhawk by Clint Langley

Publication information
- Publisher: Marvel Comics
- First appearance: The Defenders #27 (September 1975) (cameo); The Defenders #28 (October 1975) (full appearance)
- Created by: Steve Gerber (writer); Sal Buscema (artist)

In-story information
- Alter ego: Stakar of the House of Ogord
- Species: Human/humanoid (raised as Arcturan)
- Team affiliations: Guardians of the Galaxy; Avengers
- Notable aliases: "One Who Knows", "Giver of Light"
- Abilities: Invulnerability; Energy manipulation; Flight; Precognition

Starhawk (Stakar Ogord) is an antihero appearing in American comic books published by Marvel Comics. He was created by writer Steve Gerber and artist Sal Buscema.

Stakar was fated to eventually re-inhabit his infant body, reliving his life over countless times. Because of the knowledge of things to come, he manipulated events to affect what he felt would be the best outcome, referring to himself as "One Who Knows". He made many enemies in doing so, but his tampering and guidance also led to the formation of the Guardians of the Galaxy in the 31st century.

Sylvester Stallone played Stakar in the Marvel Cinematic Universe films Guardians of the Galaxy Vol. 2 (2017) and Guardians of the Galaxy Vol. 3 (2023).

== Publication history ==
A character called Starhawk appeared in an advertisement on the last page of Marvel Super-Heroes #20 (May, 1969) as the feature that would appear in the next issue. That next issue, though, and all subsequent issues of the title, were reprints of older Marvel material.

Writer Roy Thomas explained that publisher Martin Goodman "had no faith in science-fiction comics," especially three particular elements that were all included on artist Dan Adkins' cover. "Rockets, robots and ray-guns. By sheer accident, we hadn't missed a trick in including all three of the elements which Martin Goodman considered deadly. So he cancelled the book. Period. End of story."

The unused cover of the Starhawk feature from Marvel Super-Heroes was used as the cover of the third issue of Marvelmania, Marvel's in-house fanzine, and the first part of the unused story itself was printed in Marvelmania #6. Though the serialization was to continue in the next issue, the title was cancelled before that happened.

This Starhawk's material was published in Marvel Masterworks vol. 209: Marvel Rarities vol. 1 in September 2014. Starhawk was Mark Wilde, son of Jonathan Wilde, who lived in the 22nd Century. He battled an android called 75110, which was an agent of the master computer, MASCOM, against which he was rebelling. Jonathan was also part of the underground movement against MASCOM and was in regular contact with his son.

The in-continuity Starhawk first appeared in a cameo appearance in The Defenders #27 (Sep 1975), with his first full appearance in The Defenders #28 (Oct 1975). The character was created by Steve Gerber and Sal Buscema. It is unclear whether this Starhawk has any connection to the Marvel Super-Heroes character.

Starhawk appeared along with the rest of the original Guardians of the Galaxy team in the 2014 series Guardians 3000. Writer Dan Abnett described him as "the soul" of the team.

== Fictional character biography ==
=== Origin ===
A male child was born to the superheroes Quasar and Kismet in about the year 2002 of the Earth-691 timeline. As such, he was half-human and half-artificially created being. Just as soon as he was born on the planet Vesper, he was kidnapped and deposited on the planet Arcturus IV. The baby was discovered by an Arcturan couple who were among the last of their planet's mutants; for much of his life, Stakar would believe that these mutants were his birth parents. The mutants were found and killed by the Reavers of Arcturus, Arcturan military cadres dedicated to eradicating the mutants of their race. The Reaver Ogord discovered the infant and, assuming him to be a normal Arcturan, adopted the child and raised him as his own with his wife Salaan, naming the boy Stakar.

Stakar cultivated an interest in science and archaeology and explored ruins containing the Hawk God. Around the year 2020, he and his adoptive sister Aleta Ogord reanimated the dormant deity and were physically transformed. They took turns occupying the same physical space, while the other stayed in a type of "limbo". They were given extraordinary power and left Arcturus IV for the stars; when dominant, Stakar adopted the costumed identity of Starhawk. Developing romantic feelings for one another, Stakar and Aleta petitioned the Hawk God to temporarily separate them. During this time, they had three children together: Sita, John and Tara.

=== Guardians of the Galaxy ===
As an adventurer and protector, Starhawk revealed himself to the Guardians of the Galaxy and the Defenders in the year 3014. He aided them in overthrowing the Badoon occupation of Earth. Starhawk joined the Guardians of the Galaxy in a space mission, and helped defeat the Topographical Man. It is later revealed he manipulated events to bring the Guardians together; for example, when Charlie-27 teleported from Jupiter to escape the Badoon, Starhawk caused him to be transported to Pluto, where he met Martinex.

During this time, Stakar's three children (Tara, John and Sita) were changed into energy vampires by Aleta's father and sent to kill Stakar before dying from rapid aging. Aleta thereafter blamed Stakar (rather than her father) for the deaths of their children, and their relationship never recovered.

Starhawk teamed with the time-traveling Thor, and battled Korvac and his Minions of Menace. Starhawk later traveled to the 1970s alongside his fellow Guardians, and assisted the Avengers in battle against Korvac. Alongside the Guardians, the Fantastic Four, Dargo, and Keeper, Starhawk battled manifestations of Korvac's power in various eras.

In 3017, Starhawk accompanied the Guardians on a quest to find the lost shield of Captain America. He battled Taserface and the Stark, and was physically separated from Aleta in an accident. Aleta was the stronger of the pair, and Stakar forcibly reabsorbed her to sustain himself. The two struggled for dominance of their physical space, and Stakar metamorphosed into a 'dark' version of himself, projecting 'black light'.

Because of Stakar's assault on their teammate, the Guardians chose to expel him from the team. Eventually, Aleta became dominant, and reverted Stakar's body to an infant state. Aware of his destiny, she sent him back in time to begin his life cycle again.

=== Freed from rebirth ===
When the Guardians traveled back in time to the 20th century of Earth-616, their native timeline was altered – to the extent that Starhawk had lived his entire life over again and was waiting for their arrival. Stakar and Aleta had harsh words for each other, and the Hawk God appeared and intervened, attaching the two ex-lovers by bonding their fingers together. After being forced to work together for a time, the Hawk God again granted them audience, allowing them to plead their cases. He separated them and allowed only Stakar to retain his power, while Aleta was given back her former power to manipulate light.

Aleta then chose to stay with the Guardians, while the Hawk God told Stakar the truth about his ancestry. He then went on a quest to learn more. During this quest he found the wounded Silver Surfer, whom he healed and equipped his Quantum Bands for a short time. Eon then reveals to Stakar that his biological father Quasar once wore the bands. Starhawk is then consumed by Abrogate, a place where all former Quantum-Band wielders go after death. Quasar tells him about his lover and Stakar's mother Kismet. Stakar finds her alive and living in a secluded religious retreat on the planet Vesper. After that, a creature who called himself Era, the son of Eon, revealed himself. It admitted having kidnapped Stakar at birth, along with other vile deeds.

With the encouragement of the Hawk God, Starhawk and Kismet dedicated themselves to locating and confronting Era.

Starhawk as a female. From Guardians of the Galaxy vol. 2, #5 (November 2008), art by Paul Pelletier.

=== Return ===
Using some technology from his timeline, Starhawk teleports himself into the 21st century of the Earth-616 timeline, to meet up with that era's equivalent of the Guardians of the Galaxy on Knowhere. Vance Astro, aka Major Victory, was found by this new squad of Guardians, and Starhawk fights him before teleporting away. Starhawk again ventures to Knowhere, but this time appears as a woman. Claiming that there is not meant to be a Guardians of the Galaxy at this point in the timeline, and that Major Victory's appearance there has put the entire future in flux, she again attempts to kill Astro and the Guardians. She is detained by the Guardians, and held captive for a time, until Moondragon released her. She discovers that the anomaly that is disturbing the time stream is not Astro or the Guardians, but instead Black Bolt activating a bomb that will cause time and space to collapse. Starhawk sacrifices her life to save the Guardians, and instructs Star-Lord to stop Black Bolt, at any cost.

== Powers and abilities ==
The true extent of Starhawk's powers is unknown, but they are said to be immense in nature. He has an incredibly long lifespan, possibly inherited from his mother or due to his empowerment by the Hawk God.

Starhawk can manipulate light to create concussive force blasts of photonic energy, heat, and solid-light constructs. He can also fly at the speed of light by tapping anti-gravitons, and survive in the vacuum of space. By tapping into Aleta's powers (when merged with her), he can also generate solid constructs of light; it is unknown if he can do so since their separation. His natural senses, especially eyesight, are enhanced to a superhuman degree; in addition, his powers give him extrasensory sensitivity to energy patterns and fluctuations in his environment, and he can track energy trails across intergalactic distances.

He has superhuman strength and durability, and he can enhance these further by reinforcing his body with light energy; on one occasion, he was able to engage in hand-to-hand combat with the thunder god Thor. He has an immunity to most known diseases and radiation sickness.

He seemingly has precognition, designating himself as "One-Who-Knows", but this is actually an effect of remembering what happened in his previous life cycle. However, due to Starhawk's efforts to change events for the better in each cycle, as well as the manipulations of beings with greater understanding of the universe (such as Mephisto), these memories can become unreliable; the overall thrust of events may be the same, but vital details might differ from his previous incarnation.

When he forced Aleta to re-merge with him after their second separation, Starhawk's power changed from light to dark, and he was able to create constructs out of solid darkness, and fire blasts of shadowy force. Jim Valentino had initially decided to call him Shadowhawk, but Tom DeFalco convinced him to save the name for a brand new character.

== In other media ==
=== Film ===
Sylvester Stallone as Stakar Ogord in Guardians of the Galaxy Vol. 2

- Stakar Ogord / Starhawk appears in the Marvel Cinematic Universe (MCU) film Guardians of the Galaxy Vol. 2, portrayed by Sylvester Stallone. This version is the leader of a faction of Ravagers and is acquainted with Yondu Udonta, having saved him from being a Kree slave. Stakar and Martinex T'Naga run into Yondu on the planet Contraxia, where they remind him he is in exile for breaking the Ravagers' code against trafficking children. After learning Yondu had sacrificed himself to save Peter Quill, the Ravagers attend the former's funeral in his honor. In a mid-credits scene, Stakar and Martinex reunite with their old teammates Charlie-27, Aleta Ogord, Mainframe, and Krugarr in Yondu's memory.
- Stakar Ogord appears in the MCU film Guardians of the Galaxy Vol. 3, portrayed again by Sylvester Stallone.

=== Video games ===
The comic book and MCU incarnations of Starhawk appear as separate playable characters in Lego Marvel Super Heroes 2 via the "Classic Guardians of the Galaxy" DLC pack and the "Guardians of the Galaxy Vol. 2" DLC pack respectively.
