= Marvel Super-Heroes (comics) =

Comic book published by Marvel Comics

- Marvel Super-Heroes #12 (December 1967), the first appearance of Captain Marvel. Cover art by Gene Colan and Frank Giacoia

Publication information
- Publisher: Marvel Comics
- Schedule: Varied
- Genre: Superhero
- Publication date: Dec. 1967 – Jan. 1982
- No. of issues: 94
- Main character: List: Captain Marvel Spider-Man Medusa Phantom Eagle Black Knight Guardians of the Galaxy Ka-Zar Doctor Doom The Watcher

Creative team
- Written by: List: Stan Lee Roy Thomas Archie Goodwin Gary Friedrich Arnold Drake
- Penciller: List: Gene Colan Ross Andru Herb Trimpe Howard Purcell George Tuska Larry Lieber Tom Palmer
- Inker: List: Frank Giacoia Paul Reinman Bill Everett Vince Colletta Dan Adkins Sid Greene Mike Esposito
- Colorist: List: Stan Goldberg
- Editor: Stan Lee

Marvel Super-Heroes is the name of several comic book series and specials published by Marvel Comics.

== Publication history ==
=== One-shot ===
The first was the one-shot Marvel Super Heroes Special #1 (Oct. 1966) produced as a tie-in to The Marvel Super Heroes animated television program, reprinting Daredevil #1 (April 1964) and The Avengers #2 (Nov. 1963), plus two stories from the 1930s-1940s period fans and historians call Golden Age of comic books: "The Human Torch and the Sub-Mariner Meet" (Marvel Mystery Comics #8, June 1940), and the first Marvel story by future editor-in-chief Stan Lee, the two-page text piece "Captain America Foils the Traitor's Revenge" (Captain America Comics #3, May 1941).

This summer special was a 25¢ "giant", relative to the typical 12¢ comics of the times.

=== First series ===
Fantasy Masterpieces #10 (Aug. 1967), reprinting the cover of the Golden Age series All Winners Comics #19 (Fall 1946)

The first ongoing series of this name began as Fantasy Masterpieces, initially a standard-sized, 12¢ anthology reprinting "pre-superhero Marvel" monster and sci-fi/fantasy stories. With issue #3 (June 1966), the title was expanded to a 25-cent giant reprinting a mix of those stories and Golden Age superhero stories from Marvel's 1940s iteration as Timely Comics. Fantasy Masterpieces ran 11 issues (Feb. 1966–Oct. 1967) before being renamed Marvel Super-Heroes with #12 (Dec. 1967).

While continuing with the same mix of reprint material, this first volume of Marvel Super-Heroes also began showcasing a try-out feature as each issue's lead. This encompassed solo stories of such supporting characters as Medusa of the Inhumans, as well as the debuts of Captain Marvel (#12), the Phantom Eagle (#16) and the Guardians of the Galaxy (#18). The Spider-Man story drawn by Ross Andru in issue #14 was originally planned as a fill-in issue of The Amazing Spider-Man but was used here when that title's regular artist John Romita Sr. recovered more quickly than anticipated from a wrist injury. Andru would become the regular artist on The Amazing Spider-Man several years later.

Under either name, this series' Golden Age reprints represented the newly emerging comic-book fandom's first exposure to some of the earliest work of such important creators as Jack Kirby, Bill Everett, and Carl Burgos, and to such long-unseen and unfamiliar characters as the Whizzer and the Destroyer. Fantasy Masterpieces #10 (Aug. 1967) reprinted the entirety of the full-length All-Winners Squad story from the (unhyphenated) All Winners Comics #19 (Fall 1946). Fantasy Masterpieces #11 (Oct. 1967) re-introduced the work of the late artist Joe Maneely, a star of 1950s comics who had died in a train accident.

== Original features ==
Issue (cover date)	Character(s)/Story title	Writer(s)	Penciller(s)	Inker(s)	Collected in Marvel Masterworks	Other Collected Editions
#12 (Dec. 1967)	"The Coming of Captain Marvel"	Stan Lee	Gene Colan	Frank Giacoia	Captain Marvel Volume 1 978-0785111788	Captain Mar-Vell Omnibus Vol 1
#13 (March 1968)	Captain Marvel in "Where Walks the Sentry"	Roy Thomas	Gene Colan	Paul Reinman	Captain Marvel Volume 1 978-0785111788	Captain Mar-Vell Omnibus Vol 1
#14 (May 1968)	Spider-Man in "The Reprehensible Riddle of the Sorcerer"	Stan Lee	Ross Andru	Bill Everett	Spider-Man Volume 8 978-0785120742	Amazing Spider-Man Epic Collection Vol 4: The Goblin Lives; Amazing Spider-Man Omnibus Vol 4
#15 (July 1968)	Medusa in "Let the Silence Shatter"	Archie Goodwin	Gene Colan	Vince Colletta	The Inhumans Volume 1 978-0785141419	
#16 (Sept. 1968)	"The Phantom Eagle"	Gary Friedrich	Herb Trimpe	Herb Trimpe	The Incredible Hulk Volume 7 978-0785166689	Hulk Epic Collection Vol 4: In the Hands of HYDRA; Incredible Hulk Omnibus Vol 3
#16 (Sept. 1968)	"The Un-human" (Previously unpublished Golden Age Human Torch story)	Hank Chapman	Dick Ayers	Dick Ayers	Atlas Era Heroes Volume 2	
#17 (Nov. 1968)	"The Black Knight Reborn"	Roy Thomas	Howard Purcell	Dan Adkins	The Avengers Volume 7 978-0785126805	The Avengers Omnibus Vol 3
#18 (Jan. 1969)	"Guardians of the Galaxy"	Arnold Drake	Gene Colan	Mike Esposito (as "Mickey Demeo")	The Defenders Volume 4 978-0785166276	Guardians of the Galaxy Epic Collection Vol 1: Earth Shall Overcome; Guardians of the Galaxy: Tomorrow's Heroes Omnibus; Guardians of the Galaxy by Jim Valentino Omnibus
#19 (March 1969)	Ka-Zar in "My Father, My Enemy"	Arnold Drake and Steve Parkhouse	George Tuska	Sid Greene	Ka-Zar Volume 1 978-0785159575	
#20 (May 1969)	Doctor Doom in "This Man, This Demon"	Roy Thomas and Larry Lieber	Larry Lieber and Frank Giacoia	Vince Colletta	Marvel Rarities Volume 1 978-0785188094	Doctor Doom: The Book of Doom Omnibus and Doctor Doom Epic Collection Vol 1: Enter...Doctor Doom
#23 (Nov. 1969)	"Tales of the Watcher: Melvin and the Martian "	Stan Lee	Tom Palmer	Tom Palmer	Marvel Rarities Volume 1 978-0785188094	

Marvel Super-Heroes became an all-reprint magazine beginning with #21 (July 1969) (except for an original "Tales of the Watcher" story in #23), and a regular-sized comic at the then-standard 20-cent price with #32 (Sept. 1972). With the move to standard format it started reprinting Hulk and Sub-Mariner stories from Tales to Astonish, becoming a Hulk-only reprint title from #56 (Mar. 1976). This reprint series lasted through issue #105 (Jan. 1982).

A second series titled Fantasy Masterpieces ran from #1-14 (Dec. 1979–Jan. 1981), reprinting truncated versions of the 1968 Silver Surfer series, and Adam Warlock stories from Strange Tales and Warlock.

=== Second Series ===
The 15-issue Marvel Super-Heroes (vol. 2) (May 1990–Oct. 1993) was published quarterly and generally printed "inventory stories," those assigned to serve as emergency filler. The first issue featured a Brother Voodoo story drawn by Fred Hembeck in a dramatic style rather than his usual "cartoony" art.

==== Stories in Marvel Super-Heroes Vol 2 ====
Issue #	A Story	B Story	C Story	D Story	E Story	F Story	G Story
1	Moon Knight Collected in Moon Knight Omnibus Vol. 2; Moon Knight Epic Collection Vol 4: Butcher's Moon	Hercules	Hellcat	Brother Voodoo Collected in Marvel Masterworks: Brother Voodoo	Speedball Collected in Speedball: The Masked Marvel	Magik/New Mutants Collected in New Mutants Omnibus Volume 3	Black Panther Collected in Black Panther Epic Collection Volume 3: Panther's Prey and Black Panther Omnibus: Revenge of the Black Panther
2	Iron Man Collected in Iron Man Epic Collection: The Return of Tony Stark	Rogue/X-Men Collected in X-Men: X-Tinction Agenda Omnibus	Daredevil	Speedball Collected in Speedball: The Masked Marvel	Tigra	Red Wolf	Falcon
3	Captain America	Wasp	Speedball	Hulk	Blue Shield	Captain Marvel (Mar-Vell) Collected in Marvel Masterworks Captain Marvel Vol 6 and Death of Captain Marvel Omnibus	No G Story
4	Spider-Man and Nick Fury	Daredevil	Wonder Man Collected in Wonder Man Omnibus Vol. 1	Spitfire	Speedball	Black Knight	No G Story
5	Thor	Thing Collected in The Thing Omnibus Vol 1	Speedball Collected in Speedball: The Masked Marvel	Dr. Strange	She-Hulk Collected in She-Hulk Epic Collection Volume 4: The Cosmic Squish Principle	No F Story	
6	X-Men Collected in X-Men: X-Tinction Agenda Omnibus	Power Pack Collected in Power Pack Classic Omnibus Vol 2	Cloak & Dagger	Sabra	Speedball Collected in Speedball: The Masked Marvel	No F Story	
7	X-Men Collected in X-Men: X-Tinction Agenda Omnibus	Cloak & Dagger	Shroud	Marvel Boy	No E Story		
8	X-Men Collected in X-Men: X-Tinction Agenda Omnibus	Iron Man and Squirrel Girl Collected in Iron Man Epic Collection: The Return of Tony Stark, The Unbeatable Squirrel Girl, vol. 1: Squirrel Power and The Unbeatable Squirrel Girl & The Great Lakes Avengers	Sub-Mariner	No D Story			
9	Avengers West Coast	Thor	Iron Man Collected in Iron Man Epic Collection: The Return of Tony Stark	No D Story			
10	Vision and Scarlet Witch Collected in Marvel Masterworks: Vision and the Scarlet Witch Vol 1	Sub-Mariner	Ms. Marvel (Carol Danvers) Collected in Ms. Marvel Epic Collection: The Woman Who Fell to Earth; Captain Marvel -- Ms. Marvel: A Hero Is Born Omnibus	No D Story			
11	Ghost Rider Collected in Marvel Masterworks Ghost Rider Vol. 7	Giant-Man	Ms. Marvel (Carol Danvers) and Rogue Collected in Ms. Marvel Epic Collection: The Woman Who Fell to Earth; Captain Marvel -- Ms. Marvel: A Hero Is Born Omnibus; Captain Marvel vs. Rogue	No D Story			
12	Dr. Strange Collected in Dr. Strange Epic Collection Vol 11: Nightmare on Bleecker Street	Falcon	Iron Man Collected in Iron Man Epic Collection: The Return of Tony Stark	No D Story			
13	Iron Man Collected in Iron Man Epic Collection: The Return of Tony Stark	Iron Man Collected in Iron Man Epic Collection: The Return of Tony Stark	Iron Man Collected in Iron Man Epic Collection: The Return of Tony Stark	No D Story			
14	Iron Man Collected in Iron Man Epic Collection: The Return of Tony Stark	Dr. Strange Collected in Dr. Strange Epic Collection Vol 11: Nightmare on Bleecker Street	Speedball	No D Story			
15	Iron Man Collected in Iron Man Epic Collection: The Return of Tony Stark	Volstagg Collected in Thor: The Warriors Three: The Complete Collection	Thor	Dr. Druid	No E Story		

=== Other iterations ===
In September 1979, the Marvel UK series The Mighty World of Marvel was retitled Marvel Superheroes when it was relaunched as a monthly (following a brief run under the title Marvel Comic).

The name itself reappeared, without a hyphen, as part of the title of a 12-issue, company-wide crossover miniseries Marvel Super Heroes Secret Wars (May 1984–April 1985). The 1985-1986 sequel was titled simply Secret Wars II.

The final series of this title was the six-issue Marvel Super-Heroes Megazine (Oct. 1994–March 1995), a 100-page book reprinting 1970s and 1980s Fantastic Four, Daredevil, Iron Man and Hulk stories in each issue.
