= The Incredible Hercules =

Marvel comic book series

- Cover to The Incredible Hercules #113.

Publication information
- Publisher: Marvel Comics
- Schedule: Monthly
- Format: Ongoing series
- Genre: Humor/comedy, superhero
- Publication date: January 2008 – February 2010
- No. of issues: 30
- Main character(s): Hercules; Amadeus Cho; Athena

Creative team
- Written by: Greg Pak; Fred Van Lente

Collected editions
- Smash of the Titans: ISBN 0-7851-3968-0
- Sacred Invasion: ISBN 0-7851-4256-8

The Incredible Hercules was an ongoing comic book series written by Greg Pak and Fred Van Lente and published by Marvel Comics. The series starred the mythological superhero Hercules, his sidekick Amadeus Cho, the seventh-smartest person in the world, and half-sister Athena.

The series began in the aftermath of World War Hulk with The Incredible Hulk receiving a title and focus change to Hercules. Though the title does not change until issue #113 the first issue of the first story arc of The Incredible Hercules appears in issue #112. The ongoing series concluded with issue #141 in February 2010, with two succeeding miniseries announced. This was followed by Chaos War.

== Story arcs ==
=== "The Incredible Hercules" (#112–115); also known as "Against the World" ===
Picking up from the end of World War Hulk, Hercules and Amadeus Cho are now on the wrong side of the law. Hercules intends to make peace with S.H.I.E.L.D., while Cho only wants to continue his campaign to bring it down. However, on being confronted with his half-brother and longtime nemesis Ares, God of War, now a Mighty Avenger and in charge of Hercules' case, Hercules changes his mind and, together with Cho, runs. Hercules aims to seek shelter with his sister Athena in Vermont, while Cho, using a stolen SHIELD laptop, wants to destroy the entire agency. Ares, Wonder Man, and Black Widow pursue the two. Ultimately, Hercules defeats Ares and talks Cho down from his desire to destroy SHIELD. The two then join Athena, only to be informed of a coming planetary invasion.

=== "Secret Invasion" (#116–120) ===
Informed of the Skrull invasion, Athena perceives this holy war as a threat to the Earth's deities, who will be replaced and consumed if it succeeds. The group travels to San Francisco, where they are briefly waylaid for a battle with the Eternals. Gathering the Council Elite of Pantheons in San Francisco, she proposes to confront and slay the Skrull Gods, Kly'bn the Eternal Skrull and Sl'gr't of the Infinite Names, before the invasion can succeed. The force consists of Hercules (representing Europe) and Cho, Snowbird (representing the Gods of North America), Atum (representing Africa), Ajak (representing South America), and Amatsu-Mikaboshi (representing Asia). The Australian Skyfather contributes the ship on which the God Squad will travel. After a sidetrip into the realm of Nightmare, Hercules and Snowbird have sex, before she seemingly sacrifices herself to allow the rest of the group to make it through to the Skrull gods, after a Skrull sleeper agent posing as Cho's coyote companion Kirby sabotages their ship. In the final battle, Kly'bn blows up Ajak (who, as an Eternal, will regenerate), and Sl'gr't destroys Atum, before Hercules, Cho, and a returning Snowbird slay Kly'bn. Sl'gr't then seemingly kills Mikaboshi, only for it to be revealed that in fact it was Mikaboshi who survived, now in command of the Skrull gods' army of thralls - a watching Athena is pleased with this development.

=== "Love and War" (#121–125) ===
Following their victory, Hercules and Cho go on vacation to the tropics adjoining Atlantis, where Hercules and Namora frolic. They are interrupted by the arrival of the Amazons led by Princess Artume and Delphyne Gorgon, who abduct Cho (who they mistake for Hercules' eromenos), needing him to decipher an Atlantean tablet. Cho is infatuated with Artume, and ignores the warnings of Delphyne. Artume is revealed to be leading a rogue sect of Amazons, and slays her mother Queen Hippolyta to become the new ruler. Hercules, Namora, and Namor raid the Amazons' base to rescue the captive Poseidon, but Artume's group escapes with Cho, their goal revealed to be the location of the omphalos, which will allow them to remake the world. Cho and Delphyne become attracted to each other, and she agrees to help him escape. Artume notices the potential betrayal, however, her attempt to execute Delphyne fails due to inadequate knowledge of Gorgon anatomy. Artume succeeds in using the omphalos to remake reality, but her scheme is ultimately undone within the reality itself, and Delphyne slays her, becoming the new queen. Now bound to have nothing to do with men, she bids Cho adieu; meanwhile, Namora and Hercules break up angrily over her attraction to Namor. The two dispirited friends agree to go out for pizza. Meanwhile, Hera and Pluto stage a takeover of the Olympus Group, the Greek Gods' seat of power on Earth, and plot against Athena and Hercules.

=== "The Origin of Hercules" (#126) ===
A flashback issue reveals Hercules' early years in Thebes, and the roles of both Athena and Hera in his creation. Hercules' actions encourage his fellow citizens to use weapons consecrated in temples (and thus, meant to be off-limits) against the enemy, which pleases Athena but offends Hera, who vows that both Hercules and Athena will suffer in the future. The backup story concerns Cho's attempt to locate his missing coyote Kirby, who is revealed to now be fully grown with a mate, and no longer wants to travel with him.

=== "Dark Reign" (#127–131) ===
Huntsman, one of Hera's minions, ambushes and kills Aegis, a mortal given superpowers by Athena to fight crime. At the same time, Hera meets with Norman Osborn to share details of her plan, which Osborn (who does not believe she is a real god) is appalled by. Hercules, Athena, and Cho are confronted in New York City by Hera, who is accompanied by a now-freed Typhon. Hera demands that Athena apologize for going to the Council Elite (in "Sacred Invasion) and disregarding her position as head of the Pantheon, which Athena refuses to do - Hera then hints at Aegis' death. The group track Aegis' breastplate to a remote warehouse, where Hera and her forces are waiting, including Delphyne Gorgon, who was unaware that Cho would be there. The skirmish is interrupted by the arrival of Osborn's Dark Avengers, tipped off by Hercules' estranged wife Hebe (who is working as Hera's assistant). The battle allows the heroes to escape, before an alliance between the two groups of villains is concluded. Athena sends Hercules and Cho to Hades to attempt to rescue Zeus in order to counter Hera. Pluto is waiting for them, where he is putting Zeus on trial for crimes against creation. Cho visits with his dead parents, and discovers that his sister Maddy is not, as he believed, dead. Hercules attempts to defend Zeus, despite the latter's contempt, and his heroics ultimately convinces Zeus to drink the waters of the River Lethe. He is reborn on the surface as a child, and Athena and Hercules agree he must be protected from Hera. Cho, who believes Athena knew of his sister's survival and withheld this information (as well as an earlier warning from Delphyne), abruptly leaves the group, to Hercules' befuddlement.

=== "The Replacement Thor" (#132, 134, 136) ===
Traveling to hide the young Zeus with the Mighty Avengers, Hercules and Zeus are separated from Athena by attacking Harpies, and then recruited by Balder the Brave to pose as Thor in order to avert a war between Asgard and the Dark Elves of Svartalfheim. Hercules is delighted by the opportunity, and upon arriving in the kingdom quickly seduces Queen Alflyse, only to accidentally marry her. Alflyse then prepares to invade Asgard in order to install her "husband" on his throne again. Zeus is disgusted with Hercules' behaviour, and becomes a fan of Thor through reading of his heroic exploits. Thor then appears, accompanied by the Warriors Three, and poses as Hercules in order to stop the invasion. The two fight, with Thor winning. It is then revealed that Malekith the Accursed was posing as Balder to bring about these events, but his scheme humorously unravels and Zeus easily defeats him. Hercules reveals his true identity to Alflyse, who considers his sexual prowess sufficient compensation for the deception.

=== "The Secret Origin of Amadeus Cho" (#133, 135, 137) ===
Determined to uncover the truth behind the death of his family and the disappearance of his sister, Cho travels to Excello, Utah, the home of the company that ran the contest that uncovered his intellect. He encounters a familiar face from his past in Agent Sexton, who attempted to warn him about something shortly after his house exploded, but becomes enmeshed in a web of realities set up by Pythagoras Dupree, who claims to be the sixth-smartest man in the world. Cho eventually realizes that Dupree is attempting to prevent him from realizing the true power of his mind, the "hypermind", which he uses to break the illusion. It is also revealed that Sexton is in fact Athena in disguise; Cho demands to know why she did not prevent his parents' deaths, which Athena says is not how gods work. Cho angrily goes to confront Dupree, who reveals he was Athena's original choice for champion, but rejected the position, and began killing anyone who might possibly lead Athena to him; however, he does not know where Maddy is. Cho declines to fight him, saying he is not worth it, a declaration which leads to Dupree committing suicide. Cho uncovers evidence of a superweapon called "Continuum" that Dupree developed for Hera, and shares this information with Athena: both conclude they must immediately find Hercules.

=== "Assault on New Olympus" (Assault on New Olympus Prologue, #138–141) ===
Athena and Cho attempt to gather the other Olympians to confront Hera, but are rejected; meanwhile, Hercules travels to retrieve Hebe, who, after being exiled from the Olympus Group by Hera for her betrayal, ended up working with May Parker in a homeless shelter. May set her up with Peter Parker on a date, something that enrages Hercules. After an extended fight, Hebe breaks it up, and she and Hercules are reconciled. Spider-Man and some of his fellow New Avengers join Hercules and his teammates U.S. Agent, Hank Pym and Quicksilver from the Mighty Avengers to battle Hera. Hera, reveals her plan meanwhile: to erase all existence and replace it with a new universe devoid of human life (save for her worshipers). She is able to do this by using an invention called "Continuum" which was created by the mortal Pythagoras Dupree. The Avengers trick their way into the Olympus building, but are quickly confronted by Hera's forces who have the upper hand in battle. In alliance with Hephaestus, Delphyne Gorgon uses a special weapon to turn Athena to stone, an act which undoes the Gorgon curse on her. The reborn Zeus convinces Hera to stop her plan only for Typhon to reveal that he is no longer under Hera's control. He slays both Hera and Zeus before Hercules successfully defeats him. Athena then reveals that he must die so that Cho can become the new "Prince of Power". She destroys the Continuum machine with Hercules in the other world, seemingly killing him.

== Sequel series ==
=== Hercules: Fall of an Avenger ===
Following Hercules' apparent death at the conclusion of the series proper, crowds flock to the Parthenon to honour his legacy. Cho is met there by a large body of heroes from Hercules' past, led by Thor and Bruce Banner. Thor contributes a story of his past adventures with Hercules, followed by Namor, the various women from his past (Black Widow, Snowbird, Namora, Queen Alflyse) speaking of his sexual prowess, and Bruce Banner. Afterward, Athena arrives, accompanied by Pluto, Poseidon, Apollo, Artemis and Hebe, and announces that she intends for Cho to take over the Olympus Group. Apollo challenges Athena for leadership of the Olympians, leading a brawl between various champions, with Athena and her allies triumphing. Cho then travels to Hades to find Hercules, but is told by Persephone that Hercules is not there. Realizing that Hercules must be alive somewhere, he accepts Athena's offer to lead the Olympus Group, and vows to use the Olympus Group's resources to find Hercules.

=== Heroic Age: Prince of Power ===
Cho, now in charge of the Olympus Group, with Hebe working as his assistant, spends half a trillion dollars in order to have Bruce Banner build a device capable of scanning the multiverse to find Hercules. However, it is determined that this will take over a billion years to work. After a battle with the Griffin, Cho is visited by Vali Halfling, the leader of the Pantheon, who proposes an alliance in order to gather the necessary ingredients to become as powerful as the Skyfathers: Hebe's ambrosia, the golden apples of Idunn, the spells of the Book of Thoth, and the amrita cup of Dhanavantari. Cho steals the list from Vali and goes to Asgard himself, only to find that Vali had already stolen the apples, framing him for the theft. Cho battles Thor, but convinces him of his innocence, and recruits him to stop Halfling and use the power to instead locate and rescue Hercules. They play into Halfling's hands by allowing him to retrieve the Book of Thoth from the Egyptian realm, but succeed in stopping him from using the full formula. Meanwhile, Delphyne escapes from her cell and, somewhat reluctantly, allies with Athena to return control of the Olympus Group to the gods, who Halfling had incapacitated by extinguishing the Promethean Flame. Cho gains true godhood, but, realizing that he is not worthy to wield it permanently, instead transfers it to the returned Hercules. Hercules senses the impending return of Amatsu-Mikaboshi, and hurriedly departs to gather other heroes to face him.

== Reception ==
The series has garnered high praise since its debut in 2008. In its coverage of the initial arc, IGN labelled the first issue a surprising success, and, in its review of #115, singled out the series' distinctive humour: "Incredible Hercules #114 is hilarious." Comics blogger Chris Sims has repeatedly compared it to the famous Walt Simonson run on Thor for "complex, interweaving plotlines that built organically over months, and paid off beautifully" and "big action, emotional moments balanced out with lighthearted humor, and a blending of mythology with the Marvel Universe."

== Collected editions ==
The series has been collected into a number of hardcover and trade paperbacks:

- Smash of the Titans (collects Incredible Hulk #106-112, Incredible Hercules #113-115, and "Hulk vs. Hercules: When Titans Collide", 296 pages, hardcover, July 2009, ISBN 0-7851-3968-0) previously collected in:
  - Hulk: WWH - Incredible Hercules (collects Incredible Hulk #106-111, 152 pages, June 2008, ISBN 0-7851-2991-X)
  - Against The World (collects Incredible Hulk #112 and Incredible Hercules #113-115 and "Hulk vs. Hercules: When Titans Collide", 136 pages, premiere hardcover, July 2008, ISBN 0-7851-3312-7, softcover, October 2008, ISBN 0-7851-2533-7)
- Sacred Invasion (collects Incredible Hercules #116-125, 264 pages, hardcover, March 2010, ISBN 0-7851-4256-8) previously collected in:
  - Secret Invasion (collects Incredible Hercules #116-120, 128 pages, premiere hardcover, November 2008, ISBN 0-7851-3333-X, softcover, March 2009, ISBN 0-7851-2829-8)
  - Love and War (collects Incredible Hercules #121-125, 128 pages, premiere hardcover, March 2009, ISBN 0-7851-3334-8, softcover, June 2009, ISBN 0-7851-3246-5)
- Dark Reign (collects Incredible Hercules #126-131, 160 pages, premiere hardcover, October 2009, ISBN 0-7851-3830-7, softcover, January 2010, ISBN 0-7851-3537-5)
- The Mighty Thorcules (collects Incredible Hercules #132-137, 144 pages, premiere hardcover, January 2010, ISBN 0-7851-3831-5, softcover, May 2010, ISBN 0-7851-3677-0)
- Assault on New Olympus (collects Incredible Hercules #138-141, and "Assault on New Olympus Prologue", 152 pages, premiere hardcover, June 2010, ISBN 0-7851-4545-1)
- Incredible Hercules: The New Prince of Power (collects Heroic Age: Prince of Power #1-4, Hercules: Fall of an Avenger #1-2, 168 pages, softcover, December 15, 2010, ISBN 0-7851-4370-X)
