= Typhon (comics) =

- Typhon in Incredible Hercules #138 (November 2009). Artwork by Rodney Buchemi.

Publication information
- Publisher: Marvel Comics
- First appearance: Avengers #49 (Feb 1968)
- Created by: Roy Thomas (writer); John Buscema (artist)

In-story information
- Alter ego: Typhon
- Team affiliations: Titans of Olympus
- Notable aliases: Typhoon, Typhaon
- Abilities: Superhuman strength, superhuman agility, superhuman reflexes, superhuman stamina, weather modification, immortality, healing factor

Typhon is a fictional character appearing in American comic books published by Marvel Comics. The character is most commonly associated with the hero Hercules. He is based on the legendary monster of the same name.

== Fictional character biography ==
Typhon is the giant humanoid son of Tartarus (primordial deity) and Gaia and the brother of Delphyne. He later mated with Echidna and fathered many of the Greek Mythology monsters. In the days of ancient Greece, Typhon unsuccessfully attempted to destroy the Olympian gods and was buried alive beneath the Sicilian volcano Mount Etna by Zeus. Intent on revenge, Typhon battled Zeus and managed to imprison him. Zeus was rescued by his son Hermes and defeated and exiled Typhon. Typhon has since been imprisoned in the section of the Olympian underworld Hades which is called Tartarus where the wicked are punished.

In modern times, Typhon had observed Hercules's actions on Earth. Typhon had somehow escaped and invaded Mt. Olympus. Journeying to the Temple of the Promethean Flame, he used his axe to destroy the flame sending the Olympians into the Land of Shades as the Promethean Flame's power is sent into Typhon's axe. When Hercules arrived on Mt. Olympus to look for his father, he encountered Typhon who revealed his father's fate. The two fought with Typhon sending Tartaro after Hercules. After Hercules slayed Tartaro, Typhon cast Hercules into the Land of Shades and set to conquer Earth.

Upon arrival, Typhon spied an Earth vessel and attacked it. This ended up attracting the Avengers as Hercules returned with help from Zeus as being demigod the spell was not as potent and joined the battle. After Hercules defeated Typhon and disarmed him of his axe, Zeus cast Typhon into the Underworld to be placed under Pluto's care while Hercules relit the Promethean Flame.

Trapped within the Underworld, Typhon found an ally in Cylla, a witch who claimed to be the former oracle of Delphi. Cylla was attracted to Typhon, but discovered that he had no interest in romance. She freed Typhon from the Underworld and brought him to the Temple of Prometheus to reclaim his axe. The pain of him reaching into the Promethean Flames and his cries drew the attention of the temple's guardians Kratos and Bia. Typhon defeated them and discovered that his axe has been burned to his flesh. Enraged by this, he smashed it into the ground which caused a rift to Earth. He and Cylla arrived in Marin County, California and the heat of their journey started a fire. Hercules was driving by at the time and Typhon watched as he puts out the fire. Cylla told Typhon that the blood of his enemy can release the axe from his hand. Typhon and Cylla attacked Hercules, but his hatred kept Cylla from finishing him off. Typhon pushed Cylla aside and fought Hercules. After a struggle, Typhon yielded after taking another beating. A drop of blood from a cut on his forehead touched his hand freeing the axe from his hand learning that he was his own worst enemy. Zeus then cast Typhon and Cylla back into the Underworld.

Typhon later made a deal with Pluto where he would bring Hercules into the Underworld in exchange for his freedom. Typhon appeared in the Avengers Mansion where he ambushes Iron Man and Beast. Typhon took Beast hostage and threatened to kill him if Hercules isn't summoned. Hercules approached with Champions members Black Widow and Iceman. After recalling his past fight with Hercules, Typhon forced Iron Man to attack Hercules. As Iron Man attacked, Beast managed to get free and the heroes attacked Typhon. Thinking that Typhon would be defeated again, Pluto teleported Typhon back to the Underworld.

While in the Underworld, Typhon was visited by Loki (who had made a deal with Pluto for power to defeat Hercules if Pluto defeats Thor). Loki plans to use his powers to free Typhon only to be attacked by some of the creatures in the Underworld. Typhon came to Loki's aid and decides to use his powers to free Typhon, a Yellow-Crested Titan, Arges the Cyclops, a Harpy, and Kottus the Centimane. Loki sends them to defeat Hercules. Together, the five creatures attacked and defeated Hercules on Earth. Typhon goes back on his deal with Loki and plans to use Hercules to attack Olympus. Typhon uses the River Lethe to rob Hercules of his memories and convince him that he was Typhon's ally. When they stormed Olympus, Typhon reclaimed his axe from the Temple of Prometheus sending the Olympians into the Land of Shades. However, Hercules' fellow Avengers followed them and defeated Typhon's allies as Captain America restored Hercules' memories. Hercules knocked Typhon's axe out of his hands and restored the Promethean Flame returning the Olympians to Olympus. Typhon refused to tell Zeus how he escaped from Tartarus. Zeus then has Kratos and Bia return Typhon to Tartarus.

In the Dark Reign storyline, Typhon was freed from the underworld by Hera with the promise of getting to kill some Olympians. During the Trial of Zeus he acts as one of the Jury of 501 of Zeus's enemies. He participated in Hera's attack on Hercules, Amadeus Cho, and Athena only for both groups to be attacked by the Dark Avengers. Subsequently, he appeared as a witness at the trial of Zeus in Hades, accusing him of the genocide of Typhon's race of monsters. Later, it was revealed that he is sexually involved with Hera.

The goddess Athena later reveals a vision of Typhon slaying Hercules. When Hera puts her plan to destroy the existing universe and replace it with another into effect, thus destroying humanity, Typhon aids her, but the reborn Zeus convinces Hera to stop. Typhon then revealed that the bands meant to contain his power were no longer operational, and that he was in possession of the aegis breastplate, rendering him immune from harm; so equipped, he slew both Zeus and Hera, intending to cause the destruction of the universe, fulfilling his original mission from Gaia. He was defeated by Hercules in combat, despite the Aegis armor, when Hercules used a bottle of Lethe water to take his memories, and his body was presumably destroyed along with Hercules and the rest of the newly created universe.

== Powers and abilities ==
Typhon is immortal and has a healing factor that makes him immune to Earthly diseases. He possesses superhuman strength, stamina and resistance to most injuries from the Olympian Gods. In ancient times, he could control the disruptive forces of hurricanes, tornadoes, and some aspects of storms. Before his first defeat at the hands of Zeus, Typhon had a more monstrous appearance which included several tentacles in place of limbs and a hundred dragon heads. When Zeus was sent into the Land of Shades, he regained some of these features.

Typhon wielded an axe that was composed of unknown Olympian metals. After it absorbed the Promethean Flame's power, it had the ability to fire blasts of lightning, call forth creatures from the Land of Shades, and even send others into the Land of Shades.

== Reception ==
- In 2019, CBR.com ranked Typhon 5th in their "Marvel Comics: The 10 Most Powerful Olympians" list.
