= Delphyne Gorgon =

- Delphyne Gorgon as depicted in The Incredible Hercules #121 (September 2008). Artwork by Clayton Henry.

Publication information
- Publisher: Marvel Comics
- First appearance: The Incredible Hercules #121 (Sept. 2008)
- Created by: Greg Pak; Fred Van Lente; Clayton Henry

In-story information
- Full name: Delphyne Gorgon
- Species: Human/Gorgon hybrid
- Team affiliations: Amazons
- Abilities: Skilled combatant; Poisonous fangs

Delphyne Gorgon is a fictional character appearing in American comic books published by Marvel Comics. A Gorgon member of the Amazon nation, she is a love interest of Amadeus Cho. She first appeared in The Incredible Hercules #121, and was created by Greg Pak, Fred Van Lente, and Clayton Henry.

== Fictional character biography ==
In the classical age, the Amazons were engaged as mercenaries to battle an army of Gorgons. They were victorious and took many Gorgons as prisoners, who interbred with humans, and their genetic line continued within the Amazon nation. One human/Gorgon hybrid named Delphyne was assigned to serve Hippolyta's daughter Artume at a young age. She became a highly respected general, fighting in the siege of Mount Olympus against the armies of Amatsu-Mikaboshi.

When Artume conceives a scheme to depose her mother, locate the Omphalos, and use it to remake the world in the Amazons' image, Delphyne joins her. They abduct Amadeus Cho (who they believe to be Hercules's eromenos) to convince him to help locate the Omphalos. Delphyne warns Cho that Artume is deceiving him, but Cho initially ignores her advice. Eventually, however, he sees reason, and the two kiss. This was witnessed by Artume. She attempts to murder Delphyne, but fails as a result of a lack of knowledge of Gorgon anatomy. Delphyne joins Cho, Hercules, and Athena in defeating Artume. After killing Artume, Delphyne succeeds her as queen of the Amazons and separates from Cho.

Delphyne in her brief human form.

Now queen, Delphyne joins Hera's alliance of New Olympians with the goal of killing Hercules and Athena. This brings her face to face with Cho again, who is perplexed by her decision. Delphyne explains her desire to kill Athena in revenge for the original Gorgon curse, and warns him against trusting the goddess. Later, when Hera attempts to kill her daughter Hebe in retaliation for Hebe's helping Hercules, Delphyne draws a gun on Hera, demanding that she cease. Seeking the aid of Hephaestus, Delphyne has Athena's Aegis shield reforged into a helmet. When the Avengers raid the headquarters of the Olympus Group, Delphyne attempts to confront Athena, despite Cho's entreaties to cease. She uses the helmet to turn Athena into stone, which frees her from the Gorgon curse and appalls Cho. However, Delphyne balks at allowing Hephaestus to kill Cho and Hercules, and Athena is revived by Zeus' thunderbolt, conferring on Athena the leadership of the Pantheon, and returning Delphyne to her Gorgon appearance. For Delphyne's attempted deicide, she is imprisoned at the bottom of the Olympus Group building.

After Vali Halfling obtains control of the Olympus Group headquarters, Delphyne escapes her imprisonment. She finds Athena weakened by Halfling's capture of the ambrosia of the gods, but is convinced not to kill Athena and instead works with her to repel the invaders. Delphyne defeats Pantheon member Atalanta in combat and joins Cho in defeating Vali Halfling and rescuing Hercules. The two then kiss and officially became a couple.

== Powers and abilities ==
Delphyne is a skilled martial artist and combatant, capable of knocking over Hercules through effective application of technique, rather than through sheer strength. Unlike most Gorgons, she does not possess the ability to turn people to stone, which is only possessed by Medusa's lineage. Delphyne's snake-like hair can inject victims with a deadly poison through their fangs, are strong enough to hold up all of her body weight without much effort and prehensile enough to manipulate the trigger of a firearm. Being cold-blooded, Delphyne does not register on infrared scans, giving her an advantage in the dark.

== Other versions ==
An alternate universe version of Delphyne Gorgon from Earth-16191 appears in Secret Wars. This version is a student at the Victor von Doom Institute for Gifted Youths and a member of the Night Witches alongside Jubilee and Pixie.
