= Venus (Marvel Comics) =

Fictional characters appearing in Marvel Comics

Venus is the name of two fictional characters appearing in American comic books published by Marvel Comics. The first, was based on the goddess Venus (Aphrodite) from Roman and Greek mythology and appeared in her own series in the 1950s. This character is stated to be the true goddess, who later only had been referred to by her Greek name, Aphrodite. The second character was to be a siren that only resembled the goddess, having been retconned in Marvel story. The similarities between the two characters were a point of conflict in the comics.

== Aphrodite Ourania ==
Aphrodite
- Aphrodite in The Incredible Hercules #140 (Jan. 2010). Art by Gabriel Hardman.

Publication information
- Publisher: Marvel Comics
- First appearance: Venus #1 (Aug. 1948)
- Created by: Stan Lee (writer); Ken Bald (artist); Bill Everett (artist)

In-story information
- Full name: Aphrodite Pandemos/Aphrodite Ourania
- Species: Olympian
- Place of origin: Olympus
- Notable aliases: Venus
- Abilities: Superhuman strength, stamina, durability, speed, agility, reflexes, and healing; Immortality; Manipulation of energy and love

Aphrodite is a fictional character in the comic book, The Incredible Hercules published by Marvel Comics. Aphrodite is an Olympian based on the goddess of the same name from Greek Mythology. The Marvel version of the character first appeared in Venus #1 (August 1948).

=== Fictional character biography ===
Venus is the Olympian goddess of love and beauty who is Zeus' daughter by the oracular goddess Dione. She was born off the coast of the Isle of Kythira and grew to become the most beautiful and desired of the Olympian goddesses. Venus wears an enchanted girdle called the Cestus which enables her to arouse love and passion in others at will and to transform weapons into objects that can be used for peaceful purposes.

Aphrodite later became the wife of Hephaestus, whom she was given to by Hera in order to make amends for casting him out of Olympus when he was just a child. However, Aphrodite never loved Hephaestus who she found to be hideous due to his physical handicap and instead desired Hephaestus' brother, Ares. The marriage was ended after Hephaestus caught the lovers in bed together, and with a net made of adamantine brought them before Zeus for retribution. However, the union between Aphrodite and Ares produced the cherubic god of lust Cupid, known as "Eros" to the Greeks.

=== The Beauty Magazine ===
In the original 1940s Venus series, Venus/Aphrodite dwelled on the planet Venus with her female companions. She traveled to Earth and took on the human identity of Victoria "Vicki" Nutley Starr, a journalist and editor for Beauty magazine. She developed a romantic relationship with Beauty editor Whitney Hammond; he and Venus' rival, Della Mason, were among the few people to meet Venus who did not believe her when she claimed that she was a goddess. She helps people repair their broken relationships.

The series began as a light-hearted humor/fantasy series, but as the series continued, its focus shifted towards darker fantasy and horror themes. Through the course of the series, the Marvel Comics interpretations of several mythological figures appeared, including Hercules, Zeus, various other Olympians, Satan, and, in their first Marvel appearance, the Norse gods Thor and Loki.

Venus the goddess accompanied the traveller Randolph "Randy" Dover in his travel to the moon, in his self designed rocket ship. They arrived to the Blue Area of the Moon and were threatened by Luna-things creatures.

The comic turned into horror foccused stories by issue #17 but finally Venus was canceled with issue #19 .

=== Later adventures ===
The character drifted into obscurity after her series ended, and Venus did not reappear for 20 years, when she resurfaced in Sub-Mariner #57 (Jan. 1973). Venus manipulated Namor into defeating Ares, who was attempting to force her to love him. Venus was now a guide for young activists such as Namorita, searching for ways to promote peace, and to end modern warfare. At this time, she wore only a swimsuit or a revealing white gown.

==== X-Men Vs. Agents of Atlas ====
With the help of Hera, Aphrodite locates Venus, whom she views as an imposter and sends one of her centaurs to kidnap her. Venus is bound and gagged and brought back to Aphrodite's temple where she is chained, branded with a poker and put before a statue of Aphrodite. Through the statue Aphrodite expresses her outrage that Venus has stolen her name and form. The Agents of Atlas, with the help of the X-Men, track Venus using Cerebro and rescues her from the temple. Aphrodite, still angered, sends Phorcys, Venus' creator to reclaim her but is halted by the Agents of Atlas.

==== Assault on New Olympus ====
After the destruction of Olympus and the death and rebirth of Zeus, Hera takes control of the Olympus Group, a corporation that handles the Olympians' Earthly enterprises, and uses her power to create a product that would bring about mankind's extinction. In order to stop her, Athena and Amadeus Cho devise a plan which first involves seeking Aphrodite's help. Aphrodite agrees to stall Ares from defending the Olympus Group by sleeping with him and in turn Athena agreed to aid Aphrodite in confronting Venus.

While the New Avengers, the Mighty Avengers, and Athena stage a frontal assault on the Olympus Group, the Agents of Atlas try to infiltrate the corporation from underground. They are stopped by Aphrodite who confronts Venus. During the ensuing battle, Aphrodite comes to the realization that she has not felt love in centuries, since the Trojan War. Aphrodite then passes the title of 'goddess of love' and the girdle Cestus to Venus.

=== Powers and abilities ===
Aphrodite possesses the typical powers of an Olympian, including superhuman strength, speed, durability, and reflexes, and virtual immortality. Like all Olympians she has some resistance to magic and is immune to all terrestrial diseases, aging and poisons. As the goddess of love, Aphrodite has more power to sense, inspire and control the emotions of love and sexual desire than any other god. Her powers have been demonstrated to be powerful enough to influence Zeus himself. The only known beings who were immune to her influence were her half-sisters, Athena and Artemis and her aunt, Hestia. She also possesses the range of abilities endemic to most Olympian gods. Aphrodite can teleport between Olympus and Earth. She can fly/levitate. She can change her own shape and appearance and that of others. Aphrodite can turn invisible (demonstrated when she saved the Trojan prince Paris from his Greek rival Menelaus in the Trojan War). She is able to use telekinesis. The goddess can generate fields of defensive energy (force fields) as when she similarly saved her son Aeneas from the Greek Diomedes. Like other gods, she also possesses some localized control over weather, the elements and animals. Aphrodite is the original owner of the Cestus, a magical girdle created by Hephaestus which enhances even further her already formidable powers over love and desire. It also enables her to transform weapons into objects that can be used for peaceful purposes.

== Venus (Siren) ==
Venus
- Venus, from Agents of Atlas #5. Pencils by Leonard Kirk.

Publication information
- Publisher: Marvel Comics
- First appearance: Agents of Atlas #1 (Aug. 2006)
- Created by: Jeff Parker (writer); Leonard Kirk (artist)

In-story information
- Species: Siren
- Team affiliations: Agents of Atlas; G-Men; God Squad
- Notable aliases: V Goddess; Aphrodite; Victoria Nutley Starr
- Abilities: Immortality; Shapeshifting; Hypnotic voice; Illusion casting; Aquatic adaption

Venus is a fictional character in the Marvel Comics universe. She was Siren who believed that she was the goddess Venus (Aphrodite) from Greek and Roman mythology; however, it is later revealed that she is not the true goddess. She first appeared in Agents of Atlas #1 (Aug. 2006).

=== Fictional character biography ===
Venus was born an immortal siren, one of the daughters of the river god Achelous and the divine muse of dance Terpsichore. The sirens lived on the Sirenum scopuli islands and eventually fell into the service of the ocean elemental Phorcys, who used their "siren song" to lure mortal sailors to watery deaths. In the late 19th century AD, two ships from Asia encountered one of these sirens while on a voyage to Morocco. The first ship's crew became mesmerized by the siren's song and crashed their vessel on the rocks, but the Sorcerer Supreme Yao saved the second ship from a similar fate by mystically imbuing the siren with a soul. Horrified at her past behavior, the repentant siren fled and lived at a convent for years. At some point in the distant past, this siren had a relationship with the Shinto god Susanoo.

In the mid-20th century, the siren, still ashamed of her past, adopted the name "Venus" and impersonated the Olympian goddess of love and beauty Aphrodite, claiming to have sacrificed many of her divine powers so she could walk among mortals and teach them to love.

The Agents of Atlas series revealed that Venus and several other heroes who had been active in the 1950s briefly banded together, but did not remain as a team. This team later reunites, with Venus rejoining the team.

The true origins of this character were revealed by Namora: this Venus was actually a soulless Siren that lured sailing ships to her with her voice and fed on the sailors. To prevent his ship and his crew from being feed on, the captain of a merchant ship hired a mystic to kill her. The mystic instead gave her a soul. The Siren then took the form of a beautiful woman (forbidding herself to speak again) and was taken in by a nunnery, where she lived for decades and believed herself a mute servant girl, until she joined a chorus, filling the visiting clergy with lust. She was then expelled from the nunnery. Learning how to use her voice for good, she blocked out all memories of her previous life and assumed that she was Venus reborn, based on the legends she had heard about a beautiful, immortal girl wandering the world as a goddess in a human body and winning her battles with the power of "love". 'Venus' resurfaced in the 1940s and acted as a superhero. Learning the truth about her past, Venus fell into despair and nearly destroyed her companions with her song. Jimmy Woo resisted her song and reminded her of all the good she had done, restoring her belief in herself, which allowed her to reverse the effects on the others.

She had since elected to stay with the Agents of Atlas, using her restored powers to soothe and calm her opponents, while traveling around the world in Marvel Boy's ship, along with her teammates, shutting down the villainous branch of the former Atlas Foundation. She eventually came up with the idea to alter Spider-Man's perception of a common fight, leaving him with false memories of having helped someone else instead of mindwiping him.

Subsequently, she was abducted by the true Olympian goddess Aphrodite, angry at her for assuming her name and guise. Rescued by the group, they have further battles with Aphrodite, until in a climactic battle of song, the goddess decides to appoint Venus in her place, recognizing that she has not been truly dedicated to love since Troy.

After Hercules' death, she and Namora roam the world, bringing his financial affairs in order. She uses her gifts to comfort many who are devastated by his loss.

=== Powers and abilities ===
After her memories were restored, Venus (Siren) realized her empathic abilities were really derived from a powerful "siren song" — she is able to heal and restore, curing people's souls by giving them a moment of true bliss in which they can live their most prized fantasy. Her voice is mystically empowered with advanced mind-control abilities, related to her mood: when she speaks in joy, she fills her listeners with bliss and fanatical love for her; when she cries in sadness, her listeners drown in despair too. Her power was strong enough to immediately subdue the Sentry into helping her find Norman Osborn during "Dark Reign." Like many characters with vocal-based abilities, it has been shown that Venus' siren song can be disabled if she is gagged.

=== Other versions ===
==== What if? ====
What If #9 showed Venus (siren) as a member of a 1950s Avengers team called the G-Men which assembled to defeat the Yellow Claw.

== Reception ==
=== Accolades ===
- In 2011, Comics Buyer's Guide ranked Venus/Aphrodite was ranked 8th in their "100 Sexiest Women in Comics" list.
- In 2019, CBR.com ranked Venus/Aphrodite 10th in their "Marvel Comics: The 10 Most Powerful Olympians" list.
- In 2020, CBR.com ranked Venus/Aphrodite 4th in their "Marvel: 10 Best Golden Age Heroines" list.
- In 2021, CBR.com ranked Venus/Aphrodite 10th in their "Marvel: 10 Most Powerful Olympians" list.
- In 2022, Sportskeeda ranked Venus/Aphrodite 2nd in their "10 best Greek gods from Marvel comics " list.
