= Amadeus Cho =

Fictional character from Marvel Comics

- Amadeus Cho as depicted on the cover of The Totally Awesome Hulk #1 (December 2015). Art by Frank Cho

Publication information
- Publisher: Marvel Comics
- First appearance: Amazing Fantasy vol. 2 #15 (January 2005)
- Created by: Greg Pak (writer); Takeshi Miyazawa (artist)

In-story information
- Alter ego: Amadeus Cho
- Species: Human mutate
- Team affiliations: New Warriors; Renegades; Mighty Avengers; Olympus Group; Illuminati; S.H.I.E.L.D.; Champions; God Squad; Protectors; Agents of Atlas; Young Avengers; Imperial Guardians
- Partnerships: Hercules
- Notable aliases: Mastermind Excello; Prince of Power; Hulk; Brawn
- Abilities: Genius level intellect; Skilled scientist, engineer and hacker; Hulk physiology: Superhuman strength, stamina, durability, speed, and leaping; Accelerated healing; Powered armor suit granting: Hulk-level strength, durability and invulnerability; Emotion suppression; Energy repulsor blasts; Life support system; Flight; Cloaking technology; Psionic resistance; Shapeshifting; Amnesia inducement; Formerly: Hulk transformation/Rage form: Invulnerability; Anger empowerment; Shockwave generation; Energy absorption; Gamma ray emission and manipulation

Amadeus Cho is a superhero appearing in American comic books published by Marvel Comics. Created by American writer Greg Pak and Canadian artist Takeshi Miyazawa, the character first appeared in Amazing Fantasy vol. 2 #15 (January 2005). Cho usually appears in books featuring the Avengers or individual members of that group, such as the Hulk or Hercules.

A 19-year-old Korean American genius and one of the smartest people on Earth, Cho becomes the Totally Awesome Hulk in The Totally Awesome Hulk #1 (2015). In contrast with Bruce Banner, who found his Hulk powers to be a burden, Cho is a confident character who revels in his newfound abilities. Much like Banner's cousin Jen Walters/She-Hulk, Cho largely retains his normal personality, in particular the majority of his intelligence and emotional control. After nearly being overwhelmed by his Hulk persona, Cho regains control over his body and assumes a new transformation known as Brawn.

== Publication history ==
Amadeus Cho was created by Greg Pak and Takeshi Miyazawa, and first appeared in 2005 in Amazing Fantasy (volume 2) #15. Pak brought Cho back as a major character in the World War Hulk storyline, and then as one of the primary characters in The Incredible Hercules. He subsequently starred in his own miniseries, Heroic Age: Prince of Power.

In December 2015, as part of the All-New, All-Different Marvel event, Cho began headlining the new series The Totally Awesome Hulk, written by Pak and drawn by Frank Cho.

In May 2025, Cho's 20th anniversary was commemorated in the one-shot Amadeus Cho 20th Anniversary Special #1. The anniversary special was written and illustrated by Cho's co-creators Greg Pak and Takeshi Miyazawa, respectively, with Creees Lee and Jethro Morales joining for additional art.

In March 2025, it was announced that Cho would be a main character in the upcoming June 2025 limited series Imperial, written by Jonathan Hickman and drawn by artists Federico Vicentini and Iban Coello.

== Fictional character biography ==
Amadeus Cho is a Korean American named after his parents' love for Mozart's music and Methodist beliefs. His story begins when he wins the Excello Soap Company's "Brain Soap" competition, making him the seventh-smartest person in the world. Pythagoras Dupree, the game's creator and the world's sixth smartest man, tries to kill Amadeus to preserve his ranking. In a botched attempt, Amadeus' parents and sister Maddy are killed, but he survives and goes on the run with a Vespa scooter and a coyote pup. When the Hulk later saves him from some of Dupree's men, Amadeus considers the Hulk a friend and a hero worthy of respect.

Amadeus is next seen in the crossover event World War Hulk, where he encounters a de-powered Jen Walters. He then gathers Hulk's former colleagues, Hercules and Archangel, both of whom considered themselves in debt to the Hulk for mistakenly attacking him on a previous occasion. With the assistance of Namora, they attempt and fail to stop the Hulk.

=== The Incredible Hercules ===
The Incredible Hulk series is then retitled The Incredible Hercules from #112 on, and Amadeus becomes Hercules' sidekick. While on the run with Hercules, Amadeus participates in a number of adventures, including helping Hercules and other Earthly gods defeat the pantheon of Skrull gods during the Secret Invasion storyline. It is revealed that Amadeus's greatest fear is finding out that all the bad events in his life are his fault.

Following this storyline, the pair battle Amazons. Amadeus is attracted to the Amazon warrior Delphyne Gorgon. Upon her becoming queen, she is obliged to end any flirtation to his sadness.

Together with Athena, Amadeus and Hercules next confront the new head of the Olympians, Hera, and travel to the Underworld to rescue Zeus from Pluto. There it is revealed that Maddy is still alive, but missing. Upon learning this, he tearfully leaves Hercules, determined to find out what happened to his sister.

Venturing to the fictional town of Excello, Utah, he encounters former FBI agent Sexton, who had contacted him shortly after the death of his parents, and battles Dupree. Amadeus realizes the potential of his brain to serve as a 'hypercomputer', and figures out that Sexton is in fact Athena in disguise.

Amadeus finally confronts Dupree in person, and learns that Dupree was not aware of Maddy being missing. Amadeus also learns that his destiny is to be the new hero of the modern era of reason and to stop the "primordial darkness." Dupree then challenges Amadeus to a specialized version of Russian roulette, which Amadeus refuses to do, leaving Dupree to simply shoot himself. After grieving about the situation, he then discovers the truth about Hera's mysterious "Continuum" project.

Parallel to those stories, in the aftermath of the Secret Invasion storyline, the character is used by writer Dan Slott in his run on the Mighty Avengers series.

Athena then reveals to Amadeus that he is her choice to be the next Prince of Power, the "hero of the mind" as opposed to Hercules' "hero of strength," thereby suggesting that Hercules will soon meet his death. Amadeus vows to prevent this, but ultimately appears to be unsuccessful. After a fight to restore Athena to life after Delphyne uses a weapon to turn her to stone, Athena destroys the Continuum, causing the universe Hercules is in to be destroyed.

A funeral service is held at the Parthenon in Athens where a tearful Amadeus demands Athena show herself and pay her respects. In her place appears a collection of Earth's heroes including Thor and the Warriors Three, Bruce Banner, Skaar, Namor, Namora, the Black Widow, Wolverine, Angel, and Snowbird. Athena finally arrives and reveals that Amadeus is the new leader of the Olympus Group. Some of the other gods object and each chooses a mortal proxy to do battle for them. But the combatants ultimately turn against the gods, and Phobos uses his power over fear to manipulate Hades into opening a portal to the Underworld. Amadeus travels into the land of the dead to look for Hercules and meets Persephone, wife of Hades. She tells him that Hades would not have allowed him in if Hercules' soul had been there. The following Monday Athena arrives at Olympus Group headquarters to find that Amadeus has accepted her offer and is now acting as CEO. He tells her that he is not her champion, he is Hercules' champion, and that he will be using all the powers given to him to find Hercules.

=== Prince of Power ===
Athena meets with the Council of Godheads to discuss the new Heroic Age, and who should be selected to confront the coming darkness of Amatsu-Mikaboshi. Other Skyfathers suggest Thor, Iron Man, and Captain America, but Athena states that Amadeus will save the world. Amadeus, now in charge of the Olympus Group has Bruce Banner scan the multiverse to find Hercules. However, it is determined that this will take over one trillion years to work. After a battle with the Griffin, Amadeus is visited by Vali Halfling, the leader of the Pantheon, who proposes an alliance in order to gather the necessary ingredients to become as powerful as the Skyfathers: Hebe's ambrosia, the golden apples of Idunn, the spells of the Book of Thoth, and the amrita cup of Dhanvantari. Amadeus steals the list from Vali and goes to Asgard himself, only to find that Vali had already stolen the apples, framing him for the theft. Amadeus convinces Thor that he is innocent, and Thor then joins his quest to both stop Halfling and resurrect Hercules. With some additional assistance from Delphyne, who is now his girlfriend, Amadeus succeeds in thwarting Halfling and using the elixir to assume true godhood. However, he realizes that he is inadequate to wield this power permanently, and he instead transfers it to the returned Hercules, as Hercules warns that the Chaos King is coming.

=== Chaos War ===
During the "Chaos War" storyline, Amadeus helps Hercules and Thor gather Sersi, Venus, Daimon Hellstrom, Silver Surfer, and Galactus together as the second incarnation of the God Squad. Amadeus calculates that Amatsu-Mikaboshi by now has consumed most of the Multiverse and urges humanity to escape to an unpopulated and sealed-off continuum. While Hulk and his allies, the God Squad, Alpha Flight, and the surviving Dead Avengers fight Amatsu-Mikaboshi's forces, Amadeus and Galactus work on a machine that will transfer Earth to the sealed-off continuum. Amatsu-Mikaboshi is eventually defeated after being thrown into the continuum.

=== Fear Itself ===
In Fear Itself, Amadeus Cho ends up in the middle of the Pacific Ocean with X-23, Spider-Girl, Power Man, and Thunderstrike. During the battle, they are attacked by samurai sharks. It is revealed that Amadeus assembled them in the hopes that they would join him as a new super-team. The others believe he was manipulating them and turn down his offer.

=== Marvel NOW! ===
In Savage Wolverine, Amadeus Cho appears on an island in the Savage Land, where he stops a fight between Wolverine and a tribe of Neanderthals after one of them kills Shanna the She-Devil. He convinces them that he is their god and that they must help save Shanna's life. Using the lifeblood of a Man-Thing, the Neanderthal tribe resurrect Shanna. Amadeus tells Shanna what the Neanderthal natives had explained to him: the machine powering the damping field was also powering a prison, one holding an ancient hostile alien presence. Realizing that Wolverine would be releasing this creature, Shanna races to stop him. She arrives in time with Amadeus behind her and stops Wolverine. Hulk appears before them, however, and quickly starts a scuffle with Wolverine in which the machine is damaged anyway.

Following an eight-month time skip in the Time Runs Out storyline, Amadeus joins the Illuminati. He is captured by a joint S.H.I.E.L.D./Avengers task force led by Susan Storm.

=== The Totally Awesome Hulk ===
Eight months after the Secret Wars storyline, Amadeus becomes the Hulk after absorbing Bruce Banner's gamma energy to stop a nuclear meltdown. With the help of Maddy, whom he reunited with off-panel, he starts hunting dangerous monsters that are loose on Earth, but is criticized for his irresponsible approach. He encounters She-Hulk and the second Spider-Man who aid him in the battle against the various monsters and Lady Hellbender. Amadeus is eventually captured by Hellbender. With the help of Maddy, She-Hulk breaches Hellbender's ship, releasing the horde of monsters. Amadeus and She-Hulk defeat the monsters. Later, Amadeus begins having "blackouts" and strange dreams about his parents' death. After an argument with Maddy, who fears that Amadeus' Hulk is starting to be like Banner's Hulk, he wanders through the desert until he encounters the Enchantress, who manipulates him into helping her take over the Ten Realms. He is found by Maddy when Thor arrives. After a brief battle, Maddy convinces Thor that Amadeus is innocent. They go to Iceland where Thor reveals that Hulk had stolen a supply of uru and given it to the Enchantress and her partner Malekith the Accursed. Upon finding her, Thor and Hulk battle her army. At first, Amadeus tries to keep himself out of the fight, fearing he might lose control again, until Maddy gives him a pep talk. He transforms into Hulk and defeats Enchantress. Thor then defeats her army and gives the uru back to the dwarfs.

While in Manhattan, Amadeus meets Old Man Logan, who initially mistakes him for Bruce Banner. Old Man Logan notices the difference and leaves as he is too old to fight Amadeus' Hulk form.

During the Civil War II storyline, Amadeus is distraught after Hawkeye kills Banner as part of a contingency plan. He then meets with Black Panther, who fights Amadeus with his own version of the Hulkbuster. During the fight, Amadeus receives a distress call from Maddy, who has located a giant insectoid monster in Austin, Texas. They learn that it is actually a human named Christian Sung and send him to the Negative Zone. A week later, in Topeka, Kansas, Amadeus finds Hawkeye in a diner and they mourn Banner's death.

Weeks later, Amadeus meets NBA basketball player Jeremy Lin, who invites him to a charity game. During the game, the stadium is attacked by robot dragons who take Arch-E hostage. While attempting to call for reinforcements, Amadeus is approached by Maddy and is injected with a temporary gamma inhibitor. Amadeus rescues a rebuilt Arch-E-5912 from a robotic octopus, and, after exposing a weakness in the robot, manages to defeat it. He later joins Ms. Marvel, Shang-Chi, Silk, Jake Oh, and Jimmy Woo for a fundraiser but is forced to battle an alien army after they and several civilians are captured and teleported to a space prison. He is overwhelmed from defeating Prince Regent Phalkan's forces, but before Phalkan can kill him he is rescued by Jimmy and the others, who have named themselves at the Protectors. After the battle, the Alpha Flight Space Program arrives to rescue the Protectors and civilians and arrest the Prince Regent. Amadeus and Jimmy later have a discussion regarding the former's leadership in battle.

Sometime later, during the "Weapons of Mutant Destruction" storyline, Amadeus is rescuing a Russian spacecraft when he is attacked by two Adamantium cyborgs created by the Weapon X Project. While researching the metal samples gathered by the mutants, Amadeus remembers that the robots obtained a sample of his DNA and raids the Weapon X base to stop them and free Lady Deathstrike and Warpath. He does briefly help Old Man Logan and those captured by the Weapon X Project fight their creation H-Alpha.

Later, Amadeus unsuccessfully confronts his Hulk personality.

=== The Champions ===
Following the Civil War II storyline, Amadeus is recruited into the Champions. The group later encounters the Freelancers, a group of superpowered delinquents who were hired to tarnish their reputation. After being defeated, the Freelancers decide to do good but are later revealed to have bought the rights to the Champions name until Nova turns the public against them.

In Secret Empire, Amadeus joins the Underground following Hydra's takeover of the United States. The group are later captured while infiltrating a Hydra base before being released by Taskmaster and Hydra defector Black Ant. While looking for Ms. Marvel following the defeat of Hydra Supreme Steve Rogers, Spider-Man, Hulk and Viv Vision find a walled-off compound that houses Inhuman prisoners and was originally built as a prison for the original Hulk.

=== Dealing with his Hulk side ===
While in space, Amadeus lands on Sakaar and discovers that its residents are being threatened by a warlord from Fillia. As Hulk, he encounters and defeats Phalkan again before the Hulk personality traps him within his mind. Amadeus regains control, which alters his transformed state into a new smaller and weaker but controllable form known as Brawn.

=== "War of the Realms" ===
In The War of the Realms, Brawn and the Protectors are recruited by Jimmy into the Agents of Atlas help battle Malekith's invasion of Earth. After Sindr threatens to summon a volcano in Seoul and kill millions of innocents, Amadeus uses Banner's technology to teleport the Atlas Agents away from the battle. They are assisted by M-41 Zu, a mystically enhanced Atlas Android masquerading as the Hawaiian goddess Pele who sacrifices herself to absorb part of Sindr's power. While the team recuperates in Shanghai after Malekith's defeat, Brawn confronts Jimmy for withholding the truth about M-41 Zu from the team as she could have defeated Sindr earlier. Jimmy justifies his actions, saying that using the android earlier would have killed civilians and that he hid the truth to guarantee success. After Amadeus leaves to check on his teammates, Jimmy quietly congratulates him and the rest of the group.

=== New Agents of Atlas ===
Shortly after the "War of the Realms" storyline, Jimmy has resumed his duties as the head of the Atlas Foundation while Amadeus becomes the field leader of the New Agents. Amadeus and a few members of the new agents are seen in Madripoor fighting one of Sindr's remaining Fire Dragons, where they encounter Isaac Ikeda, the self-proclaimed "Protector of Pan", who kills the dragon and teleports away with its corpse. Afterwards, while Amadeus has a video chat with Jimmy, their conversation is interrupted by a white light engulfing the city, which Amadeus recognizes as Ikeda's teleportation technology. Amadeus, along with the reunited Agents and the newly summoned Giant-Man discover the cities they were in (along with other Asian, Pacific and predominantly Asian cities outside of Asia) have been connected with portals made from Ikeda's technology. Mike Nguyen of the Big Nguyen Company reveals himself to be behind the newly merged city, "Pan", which would allow every citizen to explore each other's respective cities without restrictions. Despite the excitement of his teammates and the citizens, Amadeus is wary of Nguyen's proposal. Shortly after the announcement, Pan is suddenly beset by wyverns, which the agents and Ikeda confront.

After driving the wyverns off, the group is praised by Nguyen for their heroics, who offers to enlist the agents as Pan's protectors along with Ikeda as well as giving them lifetime Pan Passes. A suspicious Amadeus rejects the offer, saying that the group are Agents are Atlas. During a celebratory banquet held in the Mumbai section of Pan, Amadeus tells Luna Snow his suspicions of Nguyen and Ikeda. Amadeus and Luna later have a stroll along the beach, where they rescue Madripoorian refugees from sea serpents. Several armed members of the Pan Guard arrive and accuse the Madripoorians of using the serpents to illegally to enter Pan, which leads to a confrontation. After the Atlas agents and Ikeda team up with the Pan Guard to save the refugees from the serpents, Nguyen clears up the misunderstanding, claiming that the Madripoorians had been out of range during Pan's activation and the Pan Guard mistakenly believed they were trespassing with help from the serpents. When Amadeus visits his old Champions teammates, they are interrupted a news report featuring Geoffrey Patrick, a senator from Indiana, who is opposed to vigilantes.

Following another confrontation with the Pan Guard, Amadeus splits the team up again: Aero, Wave and Luna are sent to patrol the city for more dragons; Giant-Man is ordered to continue working with Ikeda to gather more intel on him; while tasking Shang-Chi with finding the still missing Jimmy, Amadeus confides in the Master of Kung Fu his own struggles with leadership and his suspicions of Jimmy. During their investigation, Brawn, Silk and White Fox discover that the heart of Pan does not correspond with any known location on Earth, which causes Amadeus to deduce that the city is in another dimension. Amadeus becomes more suspicious when one of the Madripoorian refugees tells him about hearing dragons in Nguyen's tower. Brawn, Silk, Sword Master and White Fox break into Nguyen's tower and discover a sea serpent imprisoned in a lab, while Shang-Chi and Crescent discover a secret tunnel in Jimmy's office that takes them to the Atlas Foundation's headquarters in the Pan sector of San Francisco. Nguyen denies that he and Jimmy are in league with each other, other than signing a nonaggression treaty that the agents have violated. Nguyen explains that the imprisoned dragon was having its scales harvested to supply Pan's technology. Rejecting Jimmy and Nguyen's arguments, Amadeus attempts to come up with an alternate solution that could save the dragon without disrupting the portals. When Lao warns Amadeus that he is running out of time, a massive storm engulfs the city. While Ikeda reveals that the dragon is from Atlantis, an enraged Namor begins invading the city.

=== "Atlantis Attacks" ===
In the pages of the 2020 Atlantis Attacks miniseries, Brawn confronts Namor, who had summoned tidal waves along the coasts of Pan. When Namor demands the release of the dragon, Brawn asks for some more time, arguing that immediately releasing the dragon would destroy Pan's portals. Unmoved, Namor continues his assault, only to stop when the New Agents of Atlas arrive. Before retreating, Namor warns the group to return the dragon or face the wrath of Atlantis. Immediately after the skirmish, Jimmy introduces Amadeus and the New Agents to the original Agents of Atlas. Wary of Namora's familial relationship with Namor, Brawn orders Shang-Chi and Sword Master to spy on her while he, Venus, Aero and Wave embark on a diplomatic mission to Atlantis. With help from Uranian and 3-D Man, Amadeus replicates the dragon's magic with M-11's generator, allowing it to be safely released while keeping Pan's portals stabilized. However, the dragon goes berserk due to an implant embedded in its scales and attacks Atlantis before Brawn and the Pan Guard stop it. Afterwards, Nguyen reveals that he has recruited the Sirenas, the longtime enemies of Atlantis, to help defend Pan.

During his fight with Namor, Amadeus mutates back into his original Hulk form, but is overpowered and captured by the Sirenas. While tending to his wounds, Brawn attends a meeting between Atlas, the Pan Guard, and the Sirenas. When Nguyen and the Sirenas propose a retaliatory attack on Atlantis, Amadeus objects, pointing out that the dragon was being manipulated into attacking Atlantis. Namora accuses the Sirenas as the culprits, revealing the dragon's implant to be made from Sirena tech. After Namora and Carina of the Sirenas recount their people's history, Amadeus and the rest of the group are torn between protecting Pan and attacking or defending Atlantis. Amadeus decides to go with Jimmy's group to Atlantis to defend it from the Sirenas while ordering Uranian, 3-D Man and M-11 to stay in Pan. When Ikdea and Wave announce their intention to side with the Sirenas, the disagreement escalates into a brawl between the two parties. During the commotion, Namor escapes and threatens Nguyen and Pan's citizens as retribution for attacking his kingdom.

Woo reveals that dragons have served humans and used them as proxies in conflicts for millennia, making them responsible for almost every major war in history. Woo is content with this balance of power, but Nguyen's hologram suggests uniting the world under Pan, proposing to Namor and Woo that by harvesting the power of their dragons, they could overtake other nations. As Namor returns to Atlantis with Namora, Venus and Aero, the rest of the Agents uncover Nguyen in his personal bunker and confront him. Having anticipated this, Nguyen attaches a Sirena tech implant to Amadeus, transforming him into the Hulk. Under Nguyen's control, the Hulk makes quick work of the Atlas Agents before battling Namor. However, Namor frees him from the mind control device before helping him stop a tsunami that he inadvertently created. The city is saved, although Nguyen dies protecting several Madripoorian refugees. One month later, Atlantis and the Sirenas sign a non-aggression pact and recognize Pan as an independent nation. Still feeling guilty for Nguyen's death and angered with Woo's machinations, Amadeus quits the team.

=== 20th Anniversary Special, Imperial and Imperial Guardians ===
Sometime after the war between Atlantis and Pan, Amadeus reconciles with Woo and rejoins Atlas. When a skirmish with Eaglestar mercenaries causes him to transform into his uncontrollable Hulk form again, Amadeus creates his own Hulkbuster armor that manifests over himself whenever he is under emotional distress or angered in order to circumvent any future transformations.

During the events of Imperial, Amadeus accompanies Banner and She-Hulk to attend Hiro-Kala's funeral on Sakaar En Nevo. Together, they learn that Hiro-Kala was poisoned and that his death was the latest in a string of similar assassinations of other galactic leaders. Amadeus and Banner are summoned to a Galactic Council meeting at the Galactic Hub to address the recent murders while She-Hulk remains behind on Sakaar to maintain order. When the meeting is attacked by an assassin dressed as Wakandan Hatut Zeraze, who kills several attendees and destroys the dome separating the meeting chamber to outer space, Brawn rescues several people from being sucked into the vacuum; the surviving Council members subsequently declare war on the Intergalactic Empire of Wakanda.

Amadeus joins the Council Armada in the siege of Wakanda Prime and together with the Hulk confronts Black Panther, who denies Wakanda's involvement in the murders. The Skrulls then betray the Armada, revealing themselves to be the real culprits behind the assassinations, and destroy the stargate at Wakanda Prime, leaving Amadeus and the stranded in Wakandan Space.

After the Wakandans come to a truce with the Armada and help rebuild the stargate, Amadeus participates in fight against the Skull forces at the Galactic Hub and helps defeat Kl'rt the Super-Skrull. Following the victory, Amadeus witnesses the transition of the Galactic Council into the Galactic Union. Amadeus and Hulk prepare to return to Earth until they receive a message from an angry She-Hulk, demanding them to pick her up and take her back to Earth as well.

Amadeus is later recruited by Maximus into the black ops Imperial Guardians to protect the Galactic Union though the shadows. Despite their mistrust of Maximus, Amadeus and the Guardians succeed in eliminating threats against the Union while remaining incognito. The team is later sent to thwart an attempted assassination plot against the Union's leader Peter Quill but while fighting the supposed assassins, both parties discover they each are different teams of Imperial Guardians and deduce that Maximus sent them to kill each other to tie up loose ends. Maximus flees before he can be confronted and Gamora sends Amadeus and Captain Marvel back to Earth to uncover any potential plots Maximus may have there.

== Powers and abilities ==
Amadeus is a teenager gifted with a super-genius mind, bearing the "natural ability to identify the variables and quantum possibilities in any situation". He is described by Reed Richards as being the 7th most intelligent person in the world, though Hank Pym claims that, with his return to Earth from Skrull captivity, Amadeus is actually the 8th. Meanwhile, Bruce Banner claims he is actually the 10th, but later says to Leader that Cho is one of the eight smartest. The Eternal Ajak believes that Cho is actually more intelligent than some immortals, and he has claimed to Athena, who says that intelligence is essentially "pattern recognition", that he sees patterns better than 99.9% of people on Earth. Hercules has claimed twice, the first instance to Athena herself, that Amadeus is smarter than even she, and the super-genius Olympian god of fire and blacksmith Hephaestus himself admits that Cho is more intelligent than he is.

Amadeus is able to rapidly and without mechanical aid perform mental calculations of almost unimaginable complexity enabling him to, with minimal stimuli on his part, set multiple physical reactions into motion in his vicinity, forestalling technological and human activity with equal ease. This intelligence is portrayed in the comics as various numbers and other details labeled on everything he sees as relevant, shown from his point of view. He has shown himself capable of doing anything from redirecting a laser-guided missile with a wing mirror to tracking the Hulk based on his trajectory and jump height. However, performing mental calculations in rapid succession costs him immense amounts of energy, requiring him to consume large amounts of food thereafter. He previously rode a Vespa scooter and carried a phone/radio, Walkman, or other device altered to control nearby electrical signals.

In Incredible Hulk #610, Amadeus, along with hundreds of others, is zapped with the Cathexis Ray, which further enhances his intelligence. It also allows him to alter the laws of physics within a ten-foot radius of himself. He uses this power to shut down Leader's equipment and revert MODOK to his original human form. He loses this power when Banner uses a recalibrated Cathexis Ray to remove the powers of the newly created Hulks.

When the helmet of Scott Lang, also known as the second Ant-Man, fell into Amadeus' possession, he, with Cassie Lang's blessing, chose to use it as a telepathic enhancer, downplaying the size changing aspect of the Ant-Man power to focus on the mind-controlling abilities on the insect mind instead.

Also, he has inherited Hercules' adamantine mace. He also uses Bannertech to augment himself with devices including scanners and forcefields.

After the "death" of Hercules, Amadeus is made the new Prince of Power and head of the Olympus Group by Athena. This status somehow protected him from certain effects of the Chaos King. He also has access to all of the Olympus Group's wealth and resources.

By activating a special device in his left arm, Amadeus gains a Hulk-like physiology through the use of Sterntech nanobots that alter his cell structure to contain and use gamma radiation that had been absorbed from the original Hulk. In his Hulk form, Amadeus had the same powers as the original Hulk but was originally able to maintain his mind. When Amadeus began losing control over his Hulk form, he injected himself with a second set of nanobots as a countermeasure to the original Sternbots, allowing him to retain his mind but giving him a smaller and slimmer form that is weaker than his Hulk form; this form is later named Brawn. Amadeus is capable of turning back from his Brawn form into his original Hulk form when sufficiently angered, but enters an uncontrollable rage.

In response to his uncontrollable rage form, Amadeus altered the Sternbots to manifest a special Hulkbuster armor over himself whenever he experiences extreme stress or anger that gives him the equivalent strength and durability of his Hulk form while preventing him from transforming by suppressing his rage. As with other armored suits, Amadeus' Hulkbuster allows him to fly and is equipped with regular blasts, a life support system and communication devices. Amadeus also added additional upgrades which included a cloaking device, psionic shielding and shapeshifting. In the event of the suit being stolen, Amadeus installed a contingency program that projects a signal into the hijacker, giving them short-term memory loss.

== Reception ==
- In 2019, Comic Book Resources (CBR) ranked Amadeus Cho third in their "10 Comic Book Sidekicks Who Upgraded Into A-Grade Heroes" list.
- In 2021, CBR ranked Amadeus Cho 1st in their "10 Smartest Marvel Sidekicks" list.

== Kerberos the Coyote ==
Amadeus Cho with Kirby the Coyote in The Incredible Hulk vol 2 #106 (July 2007). Art by Gary Frank.

Amadeus Cho was once usually accompanied by a coyote pup named Kerberos. He picked him up along the side of the road, near a roadside diner where he met the Hulk for the first time. The coyote's mother had been hit and killed by a car, but the pup had remained with her body. Cho, not failing to see the similarity, took him in. Cho has since trained him to distract opponents and perform simple search operations.

Kerberos's name was chosen in a contest held by the writers of the comic; the winner was Martín Pérez, a reader from Montevideo, Uruguay. Pérez chose the name Kerberos both because of the mythological connotations and the computer network authentication protocol of the same name. Kerberos is also known by the hypocorism "Kirby".

During Secret Invasion, it was revealed that Kirby was abducted immediately following World War Hulk by Skrulls posing as S.H.I.E.L.D. agents after they knocked out Amadeus with gas; Kirby was then replaced with a Skrull agent. The infiltrator was able to destroy the ship by driving it off course after disguising himself as Cho. He is slain by Cho's ally Aton who sees him transform back to Kirby and bites his head off. Using a tracking system he had implanted in the pup beforehand, Amadeus manages to track Kirby down, finding him in the Mojave Desert. Once there, he discovers that the now full-grown Kirby has adapted to the wild, even gaining a mate. Amadeus decides to leave Kirby where he is, reasoning that his life had become too dangerous for him.

== Other versions ==
=== Chrono Signature Anno Doom +44 ===
A possible future version of Amadeus Cho appears in Superior Avengers #1. This version has grey skin and originates from a timeline designated as Chrono Signature Anno Doom +44. After Kristoff Vernard summons him to the present, Cho attempts to attack Doctor Doom, only to be killed.

=== Marvel Zombies Return ===
An alternate universe version of Amadeus Cho makes a minor appearance in Marvel Zombies Return.

=== Marvel Zombies 5 ===
An alternate universe version of Amadeus Cho appears in Marvel Zombies 5. This version comes from a dystopian future and became addicted to virtual reality soap operas against his will.

=== Secret Wars (2015) ===
Two alternate universe versions of Amadeus Cho appear in Secret Wars as residents of Battleworld.

- One version is a colleague of Bruce Banner from the domain of Greenland who is later killed while trying to stop a stolen gamma bomb from detonating.
- Another version appears as a prodigy and member of the Runaways.

=== Ultimate Marvel ===
A teenage alternate universe version of Amadeus Cho from Earth-1610 appears in Cataclysm: The Ultimates' Last Stand.

== In other media ==
=== Television ===
- Amadeus Cho makes a non-speaking cameo appearance in The Super Hero Squad Show episode "Too Many Wolverines!" This version is a classmate of Reptil and Firestar.
- Amadeus Cho as the Iron Spider appears in Ultimate Spider-Man, voiced by Eric Bauza. This version is a member of the New Warriors and Web Warriors.
- Amadeus Cho as the Iron Spider appears in Lego Marvel Super Heroes: Avengers Reassembled, voiced again by Eric Bauza.
- Amadeus Cho as the Totally Awesome Hulk appears in Spider-Man, voiced by Ki Hong Lee. This version is an Avengers intern.
- Amadeus Cho appears in Your Friendly Neighborhood Spider-Man, voiced by Aleks Le. This version is an Oscorp intern who later becomes a full-time employee.
- Amadeus Cho as the Iron Hulk appears in Iron Man and His Awesome Friends, voiced by Aidyn Ahn. This version wears a suit akin to Iron Man's.

=== Film ===
Amadeus Cho appears in Avengers Confidential: Black Widow & Punisher, voiced by Daisuke Namikawa in the Japanese version and again by Eric Bauza in the English dub.

=== Video games ===
- Amadeus Cho appears as a playable character in Lego Marvel's Avengers, voiced again by Eric Bauza.
- Amadeus Cho as the Hulk appears as a playable character in Marvel: Future Fight.
- Amadeus Cho as the Hulk appears as a playable character in Marvel Puzzle Quest.
- Amadeus Cho as the Hulk appears as a playable character in Marvel Avengers Academy, voiced by Nicholas Andrew Louie.
- Amadeus Cho as the Hulk appears as a playable character in Lego Marvel Super Heroes 2, as part of the Champions DLC.
