= Thor & Loki: Blood Brothers =

Marvel Comics motion comic

Thor & Loki: Blood Brothers is a four-episode motion comic from Marvel Knights Animation released in April 2011. It is based on the 2004 four-issue miniseries Loki (vol. 1) by Robert Rodi and Esad Ribic.

A DVD containing all four episodes from Shout! Factory was released on September 13, 2011.

== Plot ==
Loki has become the ruler of Asgard. However, he does not have dominion over Hela, the goddess of death. Loki is demanding fealty from everyone in Asgard. Hela asks Loki for the soul of Thor for her "legions in Nifelheim". Sif is imprisoned at the ending of the first segment.

Karnilla, the queen of Nornheim, meets Loki in the second segment. She pleads for the release of Balder from imprisonment. In the third segment, Loki orders the destruction of the Bifröst. In a flashback, Odin defeats Laufey in battle.

In the final segment, Loki refuses to execute Thor and spurns Hela.

== Voice cast ==
According to producer Ruwan Jayatilleke, the voice cast was drawn from Broadway theatre, but under pseudonyms. Nevertheless, the credited cast is:

- David Blair as Loki, god of tricks who has become the ruler of Asgard
  - Barney Townsend as young Loki
- Daniel Thorn as Thor, god of thunder
- Katharine Chesterton as Hela, goddess of death
- Ziggy McShane as Daia, concubine
- Serena Merriman as Fárbauti
- Phoebe Stewart as Karnilla
- Deborah McKinely as Frigga, Lorelei
- Elizabeth Diennet as Sif
- Joe Teiger as Odin
- James Hampshire as Balder
- Rich Orlov as Warden
- Heimdall, guardian of the rainbow bridge
