= Ares (Marvel Comics) =

Marvel Comics fictional character

- Variant cover art for Incredible Hercules #124 (February 2009). Art by Ed McGuinness.

Publication information
- Publisher: Marvel Comics
- First appearance: Thor #129 (June 1966)
- Created by: Stan Lee (Writer); Jack Kirby (Artist)

In-story information
- Alter ego: Ares
- Species: Olympian
- Team affiliations: Dark Avengers; Mighty Avengers; Gods of Olympus; Warhawks; Champions of Europe
- Notable aliases: Mars; Mister Talon; John Aaron; God of War; The Warhawk
- Abilities: Superhuman strength, speed, stamina, durability, agility, and reflexes superior to that of most Olympians; Immunity to all diseases and infections; Regenerative healing factor; Magic manipulation; Virtual immortality; War manipulation; Expert armed combatant

Ares is a fictional character, a deity appearing in American comic books published by Marvel Comics. The character is based on the Greek god of the same name. He first appeared in Thor #129 (June 1966) and was created by Stan Lee and Jack Kirby. Ares has commonly appeared as an enemy of Thor and Hercules, starring in his own self-titled series in 2006.

Ares, the Greek God of War, was initially depicted as a supervillain, opposing Thor, Hercules and the Avengers. Early on, his influence on Earth was less direct as he created an organization known as the "Warhawks" to create war on Earth. In 2006, the character was recast as an antihero who simply lived for battle, any battle, joining the Avengers as one of their "heavy hitters" with his own "Warriors Honor" codex, versus the one-dimensional villain he had been portrayed as in the past. He would join Norman Osborn's Dark Avengers, believing that he could put his powers to good use, before being killed by Sentry during Siege. He is later resurrected, before returning to villainy and being killed again by the Punisher.

== Publication history ==
Ares first appeared in Thor #129, 1966, written by Stan Lee and drawn by Jack Kirby. He would often appear as a villain in both Thor and The Avengers over the next 30 years.

A 5-issue limited series, Ares, written by Michael Avon Oeming and drawn by Travel Foreman, was published in 2006 and focuses on this character. Since the release of the Ares miniseries he has been portrayed as an antihero.

Following "Civil War", Ares was invited to join the official, S.H.I.E.L.D.-sponsored The Mighty Avengers, led by Tony Stark, and appeared in that title. He was one of only two members to remain on the team after Norman Osborn took Stark's position, as part of the Dark Reign storyline and appeared in the first Dark Avengers series throughout its run. Ares subsequently starred in a three-issue Dark Avengers: Ares miniseries written by Kieron Gillen. He appeared as a regular Dark Avengers character from issue #1 (March 2009) until his death in Siege.

During "Chaos War", Ares appeared in a one-shot comic titles Chaos War: Ares.

== Fictional character biography ==
Ares is the son of Zeus and is the Olympian God of War. Ares reveled in war and combat in all its forms, not caring about sides or victims, supporting Troy in the Trojan War. Ares has hated Hercules ever since Hercules killed Ares' pets, the Stymphalian birds, and his hatred increased when he noticed Hercules being favored by their father, while he was shunned for his brutal behavior. Further adding to his hatred is that in modern times, war is shunned and disliked, whereas Hercules is still beloved by the masses despite his own history of death and destruction. As the Romans took on the worship of Greek gods and renamed them, Ares is also the deity Mars.

After Zeus allowed the worship of the Greek/Roman gods to cease, the dissatisfied Ares held a deep grudge and would try to overthrow Olympus more than once. He refused to battle against Pluto on behalf of Hercules, and aided Pluto instead. Hercules teamed up with the Asgardian god Thor to defeat Ares, leading to Ares' retreat. Ares fought a duel with Hercules, forming an alliance with the Enchantress to make Hercules her slave and ally against the Avengers using water from the Spring of Eros, which led to Hercules being exiled from Olympus for a year.

Ares organized the Warhawks, which included Satyrs whose pipes caused violence in humans, and with them battled the Avengers. He dispatched Kratos and Bia to capture Hercules. After allying with the Enchantress again, he used the Black Knight's Ebony Blade to quench the Promethean Flame and conquer Olympus, by turning all the other Olympians to crystal, although Hercules was not transformed, but exiled to Earth with amnesia, due to being brutally beaten by Ares' henchman the Yellow-crested Titans and drifting between Olympus and Earth for six days and nights. Ares sent the two gods, Kratos and Bia, after Hercules, and despite the Avenger's efforts Hercules was captured and taken back to Olympus. Ares again battled the Avengers who had come to rescue the captive Hercules, and was defeated by Thor and the Black Knight.

Ares also battled Namor and Venus. He formed another alliance with Pluto, and kidnapped Krista in an attempt to foment war between Olympus and Asgard. He also plotted with Pluto and Ares' daughter Hippolyta to marry Hercules and Venus to Hippolyta and himself.

It was revealed that in ancient times, he took part in the Trojan War. Alongside Zeus, Ares struck an alliance with Odin against the Eternals, and battled the Eternal Ikaris.

He frequently battled teams and individuals while working as a villain, and continued to battle heroes like the Avengers.

Ares' uncle Pluto sought to overwhelm Mount Olympus with an army of the dead, leading to a stalemate that the gods and demigods (including Achilles) were unable to break. In desperation to end the siege of Olympus, Zeus called upon his son Ares who defeated Hades' army almost single-handedly. Hoping that this would allow him to join his kind in Olympus, Ares was disappointed to hear his parents and the other gods disparage his "crude" and "dishonorable" nature. He abandoned his brethren to live amongst mortal men, but did not completely give up his god nature yet.

Ares was tired of his own warmongering when he realized that was why the other gods despised him and decided to live a normal life. He gave up his position as god of war, but maintained his skills, weaponry, and immortality. On Earth, he set himself up as a builder/carpenter. He would later father a son with an unidentified mother.

After the events of the Civil War storyline, Ms. Marvel and Iron Man recruit Ares into the new Mighty Avengers. He plays a major part in defeating Ultron. During the Secret Invasion, Ares' son Alexander was recruited for Nick Fury's Secret Warriors, by Daisy Johnson, to oppose the Skrull invasion of New York City.

During the Dark Reign storyline, Ares joins the Dark Avengers, Norman Osborn's personal team of Avengers. Writer of the Dark Avengers series, Brian Michael Bendis, described Ares' role: "Ares is going to be a big part of this book. He's really going to step up and use his War God brain." During The Dark Avengers' first mission, "Venom-Spidey" is turned into a monster by Morgan le Fay. Venom (under her control) attempts to eat Ares. He is spit back out but is turned to stone shortly thereafter by Morgana. He returns to normal when Morgana is defeated by Dr. Doom in her own time. Ares later receives a truancy notice in the mail regarding his son. Deciding to investigate as best he can, he sends Alex to school, only to see him board Daisy Johnson's scooter on the way to a new base for the Secret Warriors. Ares tails them on his motorcycle and rampages his way in through the wall. When Hellfire tries to attack, Ares easily dispatches him and in their own silent way, Nick Fury and Ares ask for a private audience with one another. Ares then uncharacteristically declares himself a horrid father, but only aims to raise Alex differently than he and his father were raised. He then peacefully leaves the place behind, allowing Alex the opportunity to not have to hide his allegiance anymore.

When the Dark Avengers and H.A.M.M.E.R. go to San Francisco to quell the riots, Ares was stomping out a group of pro-mutant activists. Gambit challenged him but was easily dispatched. Rogue tried absorbing his powers, which prove too much for her, but nonetheless she manages to weaken him. Danger, fearing that Rogue might injure herself, threw an energized manhole at Ares, pushing him away from Rogue. She gained half of Ares' power as a result. The trio then hijack a H.A.M.M.E.R. tank and leave a bleeding Ares behind.

Ares, having recovered from his injuries, is seen next during the Dark Avengers' assault on the X-Men's new base Utopia (which was made from the remains of Asteroid M). There he fights with several X-Men until he is confronted with the once more empowered Valkyrie Danielle Moonstar. The two fight and are evenly matched with Dani quickly gaining the upper hand due to having borrowed some power from Hela. Eventually both he and his team of Avengers are forced to retreat.

Before the Siege begins, Osborn is seen trying to convince Ares to come up with a plan to invade Asgard, saying Loki has taken control of it. Even though Osborn promises Ares that nothing is wrong, Ares tells Osborn that if he is lying, he will 'cut his head off, armour and all'. Once the Siege of Asgard begins, as the battle intensifies, Ares finds himself battling Balder and learns from Heimdall about Osborn's deceptions. When Osborn dispatches Daken to find Maria Hill, he is struck down by Ares, who vows to kill Osborn for his lies. However, Ares is suddenly attacked by the Sentry, who kills him by ripping him in half. Alexander, after finding out about his father's death, recalls a time when he asked Ares if they would always be together, Ares responded that, as they are gods, they can be killed, but they "will never truly die" and tells him that he has experienced "this many, many times", having been "to Hades and through the Underworld to awaken in the fair Fields of Elysium...". Ares tells Alexander that he would one day die, but promises him that he will always find him again.

During the Chaos War storyline, Ares is among the dead beings released by Pluto to defend the Underworld from the forces of Amatsu-Mikaboshi, but is ultimately defeated and enslaved by the Chaos King along with Zeus and Hera. Despite the combined attacks of the God Squad, Ares is unscathed and engages Hercules in direct combat as Zeus and Hera battle Galactus and the other members of the Squad. Ares ultimately returned to the underworld with the rest of the dead.

In All-New, All-Different Marvel, Ares and Alexander (who had been killed by Gorgon) are later seen residing in the Elysian Fields. However, Ares is kidnapped and forcibly resurrected by agents of Maestro to serve as one of the Collector's fighters in the new Contest of Champions. Though Ares agrees to go along with the tournament, Stick claims that he is simply biding his time until he can find a way to kill Collector and Maestro. After the Maestro is defeated, Ares chooses to travel the world with his new friends, stating that he wishes to have a whole host of new adventures to tell Phobos about when he returns to the Elysian Fields one day.

During the Secret Empire storyline, Ares appears as a member of the Champions of Europe alongside Captain Britain, Excalibur, Guillotine, Outlaw, and Peregrine. Alongside Squirrel Girl and Enigma, the Champions of Europe liberate Paris from a Hydra invasion force.

Shortly after the War of the Realms storyline, Ares is seen watching Shang-Chi and Sword Master train in Flushing, New York. After Flushing is merged with other Asian, Pacific and predominantly Asian cities outside of Asia with portals created by the Big Nguyen Company, Ares and his Dragonborn soldiers steal Lin Lie's mystical Fuxi sword. However, he is unable to activate the sword's power, and the goddess Davi Naka traps him in a temple in Madripoor.

In The Punisher, the Punisher kills Ares and replaces him as the god of war before being depowered by his resurrected wife Maria.

== Powers and abilities ==
Ares belongs to a race of inter-dimensional deities known only as the Olympians. He possesses the base superhuman physical attributes of an Olympian, including superhuman strength, speed, agility, durability, reflexes, regenerative healing factor, and virtual immortality, though some of his powers are substantially greater than most other Olympians.

Like all Olympians, Ares is superhumanly strong, though far more so than the majority of his race. Among the Olympians, his physical strength is equaled only by his uncles, Neptune and Pluto, and is exceeded only by his father, Zeus, and his half-brother, Hercules. Ares' body and metabolism generates almost no fatigue toxins during physical activity, granting him virtually inexhaustible superhuman stamina in all physical activities. Ares' body is also highly resistant to physical injury. He can withstand great impact forces, energy discharges, temperature extremes, and falls from great heights without being injured. However, also like all other Olympians, he can sustain injury; once, after an extensive self-imposed exile on the Earthly plane, Ares was physically vulnerable enough to be injured and downed by mere bullets. At the same time Ares has been shown withstanding being shot at point-blank range from machine guns used by War Machine. Ares is functionally immortal in the sense that he is immune to the effects of aging and has not aged since reaching adulthood. He is also immune to any known terrestrial disease or infection.

While not as accomplished at magic as many of his fellow Olympians, and lacking the ability to fly, project energy and teleport, as an Olympian god Ares has the potential to use magic. Ares can sense the presence of other gods, demons, and the use of magic, call other gods, and transport himself to Olympus and to Earth at will on certain occasions (such as abandoning his station as the God of War to lead a mortal life, or when retreating to Olympus after Hercules wounded him in a fierce battle with Kyknos). However, neither his rudimentary magic nor his Olympian natural abilities were capable of overwhelming the Merlin-tutored Morgan le Fay or preventing the mistress of the mystic arts from easily transmuting him into stone.

He is, as fits his station as the Olympian God of War, a formidable hand-to-hand combatant, possessing fighting skills superior to that of even his father Zeus and his sister Athena; Nate Grey described him as "war personified, on every plane...in every future" and admits that even he can find nothing to counter one such as Ares; when Nate hid himself and Mimic "amongst time", Ares was able to tear through the fabric of time itself to reach and overpower him (claiming that such could not "limit" him), the temporal conflict sending ripples across the stars and disrupting the timestream itself. In another instance, apparently without aid, Ares was able to somehow bring himself and Alexander to another dimension, where many gods of Earth, including the Council of Skyfathers, had convened to judge his son's worthiness as the 'God of Fear'. Ares was also able to somehow create the man-eating Stymphalian birds "as a perfect expression of his own essence" ages ago, and was also able to send his son Monstro from 1805 through time into the mid-20th century as punishment for his renouncing war and change him into a sixty-foot tall giant. Ares can also use his powers to create and manipulate conflicts at will.

He is also an expert with numerous weapons, including ancient weapons and conventional, modern-day firearms. In his earlier appearances, he typically carried Olympian weapons like battleaxes, spears, swords, daggers, and a javelin (which has been said at least once to be his "favorite" weapon), but his most recent appearance shows him favoring a mixture of ancient, like the jawbone of an ass, and modern weapons, like gases, rays, firearms, and high-explosives, as well as "Hydra blood bullets", which contain the lethal blood of a Lernaean Hydra. He is an aficionado, expert, and collector of the most unusual instruments and methods of death dealing, as well as being well-versed in torture, interrogation, and combat tactics.

== Reception ==
=== Accolades ===
- In 2012, IGN ranked Ares 39th in their "Top 50 Avengers" list.
- In 2019, Comic Book Resources (CBR) ranked Ares 6th in their "Marvel Comics: The 10 Most Powerful Olympians" list.
- In 2021, CBR ranked Ares 7th in their "Marvel: 10 Most Powerful Olympians" list.
- In 2022, Screen Rant ranked Ares 10th in their "10 Marvel Comics Gods Who Should Join The MCU Next" list, included him in their "10 Most Powerful Hercules Villains In Marvel Comics" list, and included him in their "10 Most Powerful Olympian Gods In Marvel Comics" list.
- In 2022, CBR ranked Ares 3rd in their "Black Knight's 10 Strongest Villains" list and 8th in their "10 Scariest Avengers" list.

== Other versions ==
- An alternate universe variant of Ares from Earth-26111 who succeeded Victor von Doom as Doctor Doom following his disappearance appears in Fearless Defenders #4.
- An alternate universe variant of Ares from Earth-61112 makes non-speaking cameo appearances in Age of Ultron.

== In other media ==
=== Television ===
- Ares appears in The Marvel Super Heroes episode "The Verdict of Zeus".
- Ares appears in Avengers Assemble, voiced by Trevor Devall.
- Ares appears in Marvel Future Avengers, voiced by Masami Iwasaki in the Japanese version and JB Blanc in the English dub. This version is a member of the Masters of Evil.

=== Video games ===
- Ares appears as an unlockable character in Marvel: Avengers Alliance.
- Ares appears as a playable character in Marvel Puzzle Quest.
- Ares appears in Lego Marvel's Avengers.
- Ares appears as a boss in Marvel Future Revolution.

== Collected editions ==
Title	Material collected	Published date	ISBN
Ares: God of War	Ares #1-5	October 2006	978-0785119913
Dark Avengers: Ares	Ares #1-5 and Dark Avengers: Ares #1-3	March 2010	978-0785144069
Chaos War: Avengers	Chaos War: Ares #1 and Chaos War: Dead Avengers #1-3, Chaos War: Thor #1-2, material from X-Men: Curse Of The Mutants Spotlight	May 2011	978-0785155584
