= Hera (Marvel Comics) =

- Hera in Incredible Hercules #123. Art by Clayton Henry.

Publication information
- Publisher: Marvel Comics
- First appearance: As Juno: Marvel Mystery Comics #91 (April 1949); As Hera: Thor #129 (Jun 1966)
- Created by: Stan Lee; Jack Kirby

In-story information
- Alter ego: Hera Argeia
- Species: Olympian
- Team affiliations: Olympian Gods
- Notable aliases: Juno
- Abilities: Superhuman strength, stamina, durability, and speed; Accelerated healing; Energy manipulation; Telepathy; Immortality

Hera is a character appearing in American comic books published by Marvel Comics. Created by writer Stan Lee and artist Jack Kirby, the character first appeared in Thor #129 (June 1996). The character is inspired by the Greek Goddess of the same name. She possesses the typical powers of an Olympian, including immense strength, stamina, durability, speed, and healing, as well as virtual immortality. She has the ability to manipulate vast amounts of energy for numerous purposes, such as shapeshifting or inter-dimensional teleportation. Hera can read people's minds by physically observing their thoughts.

== Publication history ==
Hera debuted in Thor #129 (June 1996), created by Stan Lee and Jack Kirby. She subsequently appeared in several Marvel series, including Incredible Hercules (2008).

== Fictional character biography ==
Hera is the Queen of the Olympian pantheon and wife of Zeus. Neptune and Pluto are her brothers, Demeter and Vesta are her sisters, and Ares, Hephaestus, and Hebe are her children, all by Zeus. She was born on the island of Samos, and now resides with the rest of the pantheon in Olympus.

Hera was present at the time of a pact made a millennium ago to end war between Asgard and Olympus. It was also revealed that she was present during the Trojan War. When Hercules was gravely wounded fighting the Masters of Evil, Zeus blamed the Avengers for his condition. Hera sought to aid the Avengers in Olympus against the wrath of Zeus. Later, Hera challenged Ares to a contest to see who could cause Hercules more sorrow. She began a plot against Hercules concerning his growing love for the mortal Taylor Madison.

She has appeared as the primary antagonist in The Incredible Hercules. Following the death of Zeus, she inherits both his thunderbolt and the leadership of the Pantheon. In alliance with Pluto, she forcibly acquires Poseidon's stake in the Olympus corporation, and expels from the Pantheon all of Zeus' children holding a meeting with Apollo, Artemis, and Hephaestus, vowing to dedicate all her efforts to killing Hercules and Athena.

She is the CEO of the Olympus Group, a megacorporation whose subsidiaries include the Excello Soap Company, which sponsored the contest that located Cho. In the process of her war on Hercules and Athena, she gained herself the enmity of Norman Osborn, who saw her as a business rival but later allied with her. She orders Huntsman to murder the superhero Aegis and steal his magic breastplate. She then gives the breastplate to Typhon.

Uncovering the treachery of her daughter Hebe, she attacked her, causing her to flee in search of Hercules. It is later revealed that Hera was indirectly responsible for the death of Amadeus Cho's parents, as she aided a mortal Pythagoras Dupree in killing any potential rivals, in order to spite Athena. She now plans to unleash an unknown weapon called Continuum upon the world in order to exterminate mankind for a fourth time. She has also been revealed to be sexually involved with Typhon.

Elsewhere, angry at her son Ares' neglect of his responsibilities as an Olympian, she arranged a trap for him and a squad of his human soldiers, promising Ares' deceased son Kyknos his father's place as God of War if Kyknos could slay him.

Hera expands her Olympus Group by restoring her son Argus Panoptes to life where he operated New Olympus' surveillance program called the Panopticon, restoring Arachne to protect New Olympus, resurrected the Chimera to assist a Cyclops and some Skeleton Warriors into guarding the caverns beneath New Olympus, and even obtaining Lamia's obedience to help her servants battle Hercules and the Mighty Avengers on her behalf.

Hera's weapon Continuum is revealed to be a device to recreate the universe in an improved version, destroying the existing one in the process. Hercules and Athena assemble a group of Avengers to stop Hera, including the reborn Zeus. They are opposed by the inventions of Hephastaus, and Hera's forces, which include Argus, and Arachne. The knowledge of Zeus' return stuns Hera, and Zeus succeeds in convincing her to stop the Continuum machine. However, Typhon reveals that he is now free from the control of the bands used to control him, he resists the lightning used against him, and slays both Hera, by blasting her head off, and Zeus. The souls of the two gods are seen in the company of Thanatos, the God of Death, reunited and being taken to the underworld.

During the Chaos War storyline, Hera is among the dead released by Pluto to defend the Underworld from the forces of Amatsu-Mikaboshi. Hera is then seen among the gods that are enslaved by Amatsu-Mikaboshi.

In the aftermath of the fight with Amatsu-Mikaboshi, Hera is back among the living.

== Powers and abilities ==
As an Olympian goddess, Hera possesses the classic divine attributes, including superhuman strength, enhanced vitality, immortality, and resistance to injury. In addition, she wields a variety of mystical powers, some of which exceed those of her fellow Olympian goddesses. However, her magical prowess is generally regarded as being surpassed by that of her brothers, Zeus, Poseidon, and Hades. Hera's abilities include the power of flight at remarkable speeds, the ability to change her form—altering her size, appearance, or even assuming the guise of other beings, animals, or objects. She can also render herself and others invisible to mortal perception. Moreover, Hera can cast transformative spells on beings and objects alike and unleash mystic bolts of concussive energy. Notably, she has the ability to traverse dimensions, traveling effortlessly between realms such as Olympus and Earth. Following Zeus’s death, Hera ascends to his position as the ruler of the gods and wields his iconic thunderbolt.

== Reception ==
- In 2022, Sportskeeda ranked Hera 6th in their "10 best Greek gods from Marvel comics " list.
- In 2022, Screen Rant included Hera in their "10 Most Powerful Olympian Gods In Marvel Comics" list.
