= Lorelei (Asgardian) =

- Cover of Thor #359 with Lorelei, Loki and Thor; Art by Walt Simonson.

Publication information
- Publisher: Marvel Comics
- First appearance: The Mighty Thor #337 (November 1983)
- Created by: Walter Simonson

In-story information
- Full name: Lorelei
- Species: Asgardian
- Place of origin: Asgard
- Notable aliases: Melodi; Ice Queen; Valkyrie
- Abilities: Superhuman strength, stamina, durability, speed, agility, reflexes, healing, and longevity; Abilities via mysticism: Energy manipulation; Petrifying kiss

Lorelei is a fictional character appearing in American comic books published by Marvel Comics. She is based on the being Lorelei from Germanic mythology.

Lorelei appeared in the first season of the Marvel Cinematic Universe television series Agents of S.H.I.E.L.D., portrayed by Elena Satine.

== Publication history ==
Lorelei first appeared in Thor #337 (November 1983), and was created by Walt Simonson. Lorelei became a recurring character throughout the Thor series and also appeared in Black Knight #3 (August 1990), Journey into Mystery #509-511 (May–August 1997), The Defenders vol. 2 #1-4 (March–June 2001), Loki #1 (January 2004), and Thor: Son of Asgard #5 (June 2004).

== Fictional character biography ==
Lorelei is the younger sister of Amora the Enchantress. Loki agrees to take Lorelei to Manhattan to win Thor's love; in exchange. Lorelei agrees to travel to a dangerous district in New York City to hypnotize Fafnir into attacking Thor. Fafnir instead hypnotizes Lorelei, and places her in a trap near the workplace of Thor's alter ego Sigurd Jarlson. Thor, as Jarlson, finds and rescues the unconscious Lorelei, and fights Fafnir until the dragon flees. Believing her to be mortal, Thor calls for an ambulance; before she is taken away, Lorelei lets Thor know she is attracted to him and promises to thank him properly when she has recovered. As the ambulance drives off, he realizes he does not know her name.

Lorelei hears that Fafnir, bent on revenge, is rampaging around New York destroying buildings. Thor arrives, battles and kills Fafnir, and returns home to Jarlson's apartment. Using the name 'Melodi', Lorelei visits Jarlson to thank him for saving her life. She offers him a back rub, and gives him some of her golden mead, a love potion which will cause him to fall in love with the first person he sees. He falls asleep and Lorelei exits the apartment, leaving a note offering to cook dinner for him next weekend. Melodi and Jarlson go on several dates; none of them end in Jarlson drinking her mead. At her apartment, she is changing into something comfortable when Jarlson takes a phone call and suddenly has to leave, turning into Thor in a nearby alley. Melodi answers a knock on the door and is kidnapped by Malekith the Accursed. He leaves a duplicate Melodi in her place. When Thor visits "Melodi", he drinks the mead and falls madly in love with her.

Heimdall sees that Thor is under Lorelei's control and works with Enchantress to manipulate Thor into overcoming the control. Thor hurls Mjolnir into the sky, and grabs Loki by the throat. Loki releases Thor from his spell; Thor, no longer in love, pushes Lorelei aside and leaves, leaving her to fawn over Loki.

=== Trip to Hel ===
As Seth and his army close in on Asgard, Lorelei stands with Amora when their loyalty to Asgard is questioned. Hearing that Heimdall has been injured, Amora rushes off in a fury. A distressed Lorelei joins the battle and leaps in the way of projectiles meant for Balder, ending up mortally wounded. Hela takes Lorelei's soul and places it in the Destroyer.

Sif and Balder travel to Hel in search of Thor's spirit. Inhabiting the Destroyer, Lorelei stops them, declares that she has overthrown Hela, and attacks them. Sif and Balder escape by using a Norn Stone to become invisible. Balder and Sif seek a mystic sword which can free Hela from her crystal prison but the sword is holding Gar-Toom prisoner. They retrieve the sword, but then are trapped between Gar-Toom and the Destroyer. The Destroyer destroys Gar-Toom while Balder frees Hela, and the pair learn that it is Lorelei who inhabits the Destroyer. She prepares to unleash its ultimate power of disintegration, but is delayed when she accidentally collapses a wall onto herself, killing her.

=== Journey into Mystery ===
While Amora and the other the Asgardian gods work to recover their true identities, Seth restores Lorelei to life and urges her to kill Amora in order to step out of her sister's shadow. While restrained by her sister and the other gods, Lorelei knocks everyone unconscious with a concussive spell. Lorelei takes Amora into an adjacent realm to terrorize her, but Amora refuses to fight back. Lorelei reveals that Seth has created her from a mere shadow without any emotion or conscience. Amora begs Lorelei's forgiveness for not being a very good older sister, and releases her from Seth's spell, destroying her body.

=== Defenders ===
Pluto transforms Lorelei into a Valkyrie and sends her to Earth with little memory and the inability to speak. Valkyrie travels with Nighthawk and Hellcat to Canada, where Lorelei and Parrington battle while the Defenders fight Pluto's minions. Lorelei is able to break Pluto's spell; she returns to her natural form and attacks Pluto. The two fight to gain control over the Valkyrie while the Defenders destroy Pluto's temple, allowing his denizens of the dead to enter Earth. As the Defenders fight the dead, the Valkyrior come to their aid. Pluto and Lorelei continue their fight for control of Valkyrie, who breaks the spell and lashes out against them. Pluto and Lorelei teleport away rather than face Zeus' wrath.

== Powers and abilities ==
Like all Asgardians, Lorelei is long-lived, aging at an extremely slow rate upon reaching adulthood. Asgardian flesh and bone is about three times denser than similar human tissue, contributing to her superhuman strength, durability and endurance. She is also immune to all Earth diseases and resistant to conventional injury.

Lorelei may have the potential for mystical powers like her sister, Amora, but she chosen not to develop it to the same extent. In battle against Seth and his minions, she was depicted as firing mystical force bolts, similar to her sister's. After being resurrected by Seth, her magical powers were greatly enhanced, even beyond those of her sister and she retained these heightened abilities in later years, with her power being equal to that of Pluto.

Lorelei's great beauty and seductive manner enable her to persuade virtually any male god or mortal to do whatever she wants. Lorelei has some knowledge of sorcery, mostly pertaining to love charms and potions. Lorelei also possesses a petrifying kiss, transforming victims into a granite statue.

== Other versions ==
Lorelei from Loki

=== Loki Triumphant ===
After Loki defeats Thor and becomes the new master of Asgard, Lorelei returns to the castle and wants payment for helping him achieve his newfound status. She is accompanied by many shadowy figures demanding their due for their part in making Loki master, but Loki grows bored listening to their demands and leaves.

=== Spider-Ham ===
Lorelei Lemur, a funny animal version of Lorelei, appears in Peter Porker, the Spectacular Spider-Ham #4.

== In other media ==
=== Television ===
- Lorelei appears in "The Mighty Thor" segment of The Marvel Super Heroes, voiced by Peg Dixon.
- Lorelei appears in Agents of S.H.I.E.L.D., portrayed by Elena Satine.

=== Video games ===
Lorelei appears as a playable character in Lego Marvel Avengers.
