= Hela (character) =

Marvel Comics fictional character

- Hela as depicted in The Mighty Thor #190 (July 1971). Art by John Buscema.

Publication information
- Publisher: Marvel Comics
- First appearance: Journey into Mystery #102 (March 1964)
- Created by: Stan Lee (writer); Jack Kirby (artist)

In-story information
- Species: Asgardian
- Team affiliations: Hell-Lords; Death Gods; Black Order
- Notable aliases: Goddess of Death; The Death Queen; Mistress of the Darkness; Miss Halja
- Abilities: Superhuman strength, speed, stamina, and durability; Black magic; Telepathy (limited only to her undead warriors); Immortality; Necromancy; Deadly touch (Hand of Glory); High-level mystical powers

Hela (/ˈhɛlə/) is a fictional character appearing in American comic books published by Marvel Comics. She is based on the goddess Hel from Norse mythology, and was first adapted by Stan Lee and Jack Kirby in Journey into Mystery #102. Hela is the Asgardian Goddess of Death who serves as the ruler of Hel and Niflheim. The character is usually depicted as an adversary of the superhero Thor.

Hela made her live-action debut in the Marvel Cinematic Universe film Thor: Ragnarok (2017), portrayed by Cate Blanchett. Blanchett also voiced alternate versions of the character in the animated series What If...?.

== Publication history ==
Hela on the cover of The Mighty Thor #150 (March 1968). Art by Jack Kirby.

Hela was adapted from Norse myths by Stan Lee and Jack Kirby, and first appeared in Journey into Mystery #102 (March 1964).

== Fictional character biography ==
Hela was born in Jotunheim, the land of the giants. She is the child of Loki (albeit a different incarnation who died during a previous Asgardian Ragnarok) and the giantess Angrboða. When she came of age, Odin appointed her as the Goddess of the Dead, giving her rulership over the dead in the realms of Hel and Niflheim.

=== Queen of Hel ===
Hela often tried to expand her power to the dead who dwell in Valhalla as well. These attempts often brought Hela into conflict with Odin or his son Thor. She once appeared to Thor while he was on the verge of death after battling the Wrecker, who knocked a building onto him while he was depowered. She failed to tempt Thor into entering Valhalla, despite an image of one that dwelled there.

Later, she stole a portion of the sleeping Odin's soul while he was on the Sea of Eternal Night due to Loki planning to take over Asgard, thus creating a powerful entity known as Infinity. Hela then unleashed Infinity upon the universe. Infinity even took control of Odin. Hela killed Thor, who was restored to life by the sacrifice of her servant, the Silent One. Odin then killed Hela to save Thor, but then Odin returned her to life after Thor convinced him to restore the natural balance of life and death. Hela kills Thor again after tracking him down by putting humans in danger, but restored him to life after Sif offered to die in his place.

Hela later battled the Olympian Death-god Pluto for the right to claim Odin's soul, as Odin had been killed by the monster Mangog. As a result, Hela restored Odin to life to prevent Pluto from claiming him. Hela plotted with Loki to bring about Ragnarök by killing the god Balder then attacking Asgard. She summoned Volla's spirit before this to tell her and Loki about Ragnarok, after which she prepared an army of monsters to attack Asgard. However Odin used his powers to prevent Balder dying. Later Balder was restored after the Asgardian's death and resurrection battling the Celestials.

During this fight with Thor, in revenge for his defiance and invasion of her realm, Hela cursed Thor with a dark form of eternal life, making him incapable of dying while also making his bones weak and brittle so that they would break more easily and wouldn't heal from the damage inflicted, Hela reflecting in satisfaction at the image of Thor coming to long for death while she refuses to grant it. Hela then contested against Mephisto who attempted to possess Thor's soul. Thor creates special mystical armor as protection, but after battling and defeating the Midgard Serpent, his body is pulverized into jelly. Thor eventually forces Hela to lift the curse by using the Destroyer as his host body to invade Hel, forcing Hela to restore his body to life and health before he could destroy her.

From time to time, Odin would enter a magical sleep in order to bolster his powers. It was during one of these sleeps that Hela made a plan for power. She corrupted the Valkyrior, mentally and physically, transforming them into fire-demons. This also included Danielle Moonstar, of the New Mutants, who was on Earth at the time, who Hela set against the New Mutants. Moonstar and her team were eventually brought over to Asgard. Hela sent the Valkyries against the dwarves and New Mutants in Asgard. The New Mutants skirmished with Hela's forces again and again, even rescuing the prisoner Hrimhari, an Asgardian wolf prince. Hela forced the dwarf Eitri to forge a sword of Asgardian metal "uru". One of Hela's spells split the group. This resulted in a more efficient recruitment of resistance force, which included the Warriors Three. Hela sent Mirage to kill the sleeping Odin. While most of the Asgardian forces battled Hela's soldiers, the mutants ventured to Odin's very bedchambers, saved Odin's life and foiled Hela's plans. Hela was defeated when the uru sword was destroyed.

=== Hela on Earth ===
Hela was awakened from her mortal guise after Ragnarök by Thor, albeit due to Loki's machinations. She now lives in Las Vegas, maintaining a lair where she can feed on the souls of random unlucky people, and agrees to use her powers to aid Loki in bringing him back in time to Asgard to complete his own sinister plans for Asgard.

Hela meets with Mephisto, Blackheart, Satannish, and Dormammu about a disturbance created by the newly resurrected Magik, who is looking for the soulsword and the original Bloodstone amulet. Belasco's daughter Witchfire appears during the meeting and reveals she is now the current owner of the original amulet and vows to take her father's place as ruler of Limbo and seat at their table.

When Norman Osborn attempts to subdue the X-Men, Cyclops sends Danielle Moonstar to Las Vegas where she approaches Hela for a boon. Hela warns her that the price of the boon is a heavy one, but Moonstar accepts, requesting "a new ride home and a big ol' sword." Later, Hela is summoned to Utopia by Hrimhari to save his lover Wolfsbane, who is pregnant and likely to die in childbirth. Faced with a moral dilemma, to save his child or Wolfsbane; Hrimhari asks Hela to restore Elixir to full health so Elixir may heal them both and to take him instead. Hela agrees and takes Hrimhari away.

=== Siege of Asgard ===
During the Siege of Asgard, Loki appears before Hela asking if she has made arrangements for the dead. Hela points out she is without a Hel so she cannot take them in and plans to let the dead wander Midgard forever. Loki provides her with proof of the Disir, banished, cannibalistic Valkyries who once belonged to Bor whom he cursed for dining on the flesh of other Asgardians to only be able to feed on the souls of gods. Using his extraordinary swordsmanship skills Loki was able to make a group of 13 submit to him. Meeting with Mephisto, Loki strikes up a deal granting a portion of his netherworld to Hela for one thousand and one years, as her new Hel. In exchange for this, Hela erases Loki from the Books of Hel, thus he is no longer tied to Hel or Asgard, gaining absolute freedom. Unknown to Hela, Loki had manipulated these events in his favor as he had the Disir in his services and had leased them out to Mephisto for one hundred and one days after demonstrating their skill to the demon lord. Hela summons Danielle Moonstar to repay her debt and to gather the spirits of the Asgardians who died in battle with Norman Osborn's forces as quickly as possible so they do not fall prey to the Disir.

The Disir, still hungry, attack Hela's new Hel as it was not the true Hel they were banished from. Sensing the Disir's assault on the dead Asgardians, Hela attempts to protect them using the sword Eir-Gram, but she is disarmed and her arm sliced off brutally. Hela is quickly overwhelmed and her own remaining power insufficient to counter theirs. Absorbing the dead into her body, Hela creates a fortress around herself to protect them and asks Thor for help through the recently deceased body of an Asgardian. With the help of Thor and Tyr, they manage to kill and banish the remaining Disir, whose souls are claimed by the triumphant Mephisto.

=== Avengers Prime ===
In the aftermath of the Siege of Asgard, Captain America, Iron Man, and Thor are mysteriously drawn into one of the other Nine Realms, eventually revealed to be the Hel-realm of Hela. Thor, after a fierce struggle with the Enchantress, engages in open combat with the Nightsword-armed Hela, and though managing to hold his own against her and her forces for some time, ultimately falls to her immense and evidently vastly enhanced power. Amora, after teleporting herself and Hela away to save Thor's life, herself challenges Hela using all her strength, but Hela defeats her twice in quick succession, attempts and fails to destroy Mjolnir, despite summoning Bor himself to her aid, and apparently kills the Enchantress after revealing that she now wields the Twilight Sword of Surtur.

After Thor reunites with Iron Man and Captain America, he manages to persuade many of his former Asgardian enemies into rallying behind him into an army against Hela and her own forces. Hela attacks Thor and his allies, defeating and nearly killing him with the power of the Twilight Sword, but the Enchantress intervenes and saves him, teleporting him away to re-claim Mjolnir and using her own powers to help Thor fight Hela. Thor ultimately manages to claim the Twilight Sword and uses it to restore the Nine Worlds back to their former harmony and order while banishing Hela, but refuses to set Asgard back into the sky, as Amora asks, claiming that using such unholy power for his own ends would make him the same as Hela herself. A grateful and healed Amora then returns Thor and his friends back to Midgard after Thor promises her that her allegiance will not be forgotten.

=== Chaos War ===
During the Chaos War storyline, Hela breaks into Pluto's throne room in the Underworld to warn him of Amatsu-Mikaboshi's army decimating the death realms, joining forces with him in a desperate and a seemingly futile attempt to repel the massive assault on their domains. Hela, along with Pluto, Satannish, and many other rulers of Earth's various netherworlds, are shown to be slaves of the Chaos King after he obliterates the realms of Hell itself.

=== "Fear Itself" ===
During the 2011 "Fear Itself" storyline, Cyclops sends Danielle Moonstar to what is left of Las Vegas to look for Hela while the X-Men fight Kuurth. Hela had taken to living in a Las Vegas casino. When Moonstar does find Hela, she teleports Moonstar to Hel in order to defend it. When her teammates try to invoke dark magic to summon a portal to follow Moonstar, they end up in Hell instead of Hel. They encounter Mephisto, who says that he will get them to Hel if Magma goes out with him.

=== Queen No More ===
Following the death of her lover, Sera, Angela petitions Hela to free her soul. When Hela refuses, Angela launches a campaign to conquer her realm, assisted by Hela's handmaiden, Leah. Angela eventually succeeds in besting Hela and takes her crown, becoming the new queen. However, she quickly abdicates her position and installs Balder as the ruler of Hel, while a bound Hela is taken prisoner.

A greatly weakened Hela later escapes captivity and makes her way to the Triskelion on Earth, where Thanos has been imprisoned after a recent battle with the Ultimates. Disguising her identity with a full hooded robe, she proposes an alliance with Thanos and is tasked with bringing him the Mjolnir of an alternate universe version of Thor as tribute. Accompanied by Proxima Midnight and Black Swan, Hela travels to the Collector's fortress, where the hammer is being held. There, the trio battle Thor and Beta Ray Bill, and fail in retrieving the hammer. Upon returning to Thanos, Hela reveals her true identity and easily defeats both Black Swan and Proxima Midnight to demonstrate her power. She then tells Thanos that she needs his help to reclaim rule of Hel, and offers to grant him the death he has long been seeking in exchange. Hela then kisses Thanos in a passionate embrace.

=== Queen in Black ===
Hela captures a weakened Knull shortly after his resurrection and drains his powers, gaining control over Knull's creations, the symbiotes. The subsequent storyline Queen in Black sees Hela and Knull invade Earth simultaneously, with Hela backed by an army of symbiotes bonded to aliens. The Defenders pit Hela and Knull against each other which almost succeeds, but Knull unexpectedly kills Hela and regains his power over darkness.

== Powers and abilities ==
Although Hela is classified as an Asgardian and has the physical stature of an Asgardian, her actual heritage is as a full blooded giant of Jötunheimr, even though both races share similar attributes. Hela possesses attributes common to Asgardian gods. She possesses superhuman strength, speed, stamina, agility, reflexes and durability at levels far surpassing those of the vast majority of either race. Her vast strength has allowed her to engage in sustained hand-to-hand combat with Thor. Like all Asgardians she has resistance to magic.

Hela has vast mystical powers which she can use for various effects like limitless astral projection while retaining many of her powers and abilities, firing deadly bolts of energy from her hands which can age or even kill Asgardians, levitation and the creation of illusions, she can manipulate the dark magic. Her most powerful ability is her Hand of Glory, a technique that uses mystical energy to enhance the strength of her punch to kill even an Asgardian.

As a Death Goddess, Hela has a pact with Death, allowing her to claim the souls of any worshipper of the Asgardians and the Asgardians themselves and take them to Hel or Niflheim, as well as able to travel nearly anywhere within the Nine Worlds in an instant. While Hela's touch is fatal to mortals as well and she is capable of stealing their souls into Hel, she generally did not claim the souls of mortal heroes unless she finds their souls particularly appealing, leaving that task to the Valkyries who took the souls of heroes to Valhalla. Hela is usually willing to wait until a person has died before claiming the soul, but she can kill a healthy human or even Asgardian with a single touch, her "touch of death." Hela is also willing to use her illusions to kill living Asgardians. Hela also has the ability to restore a dead Asgardian to life provided their spirits have not passed on to the afterlife, but she rarely used these abilities.

Hela always wears her magical cloak which enhances her strength and keeps her young and healthy. The goddess has jet black hair and bright green eyes. Without the cloak, Hela reverts to her true form: in this form half of her body is healthy and beautiful, while the other half is decaying, though it appears alive and beautifully healthy while she wears her cloak. Without the cloak Hela is very weak and can barely move, and her powers are greatly reduced; she is unable to levitate or even stand, and cannot project mystical bolts. Hela does not need to wear the cloak; simply touching it is enough to restore her to her stronger form.

Hela is often armed with her "Nightsword," and is a proficient swordswoman.

Hela can command all of the dead who dwell in Hel and Niflheim, but she has no power over the dead in Valhalla.

== Reception ==
Various online articles have assessed Hela as among the most powerful villains in Marvel Comics. In 2022, The A.V. Club ranked Hela 42nd in their "100 best Marvel characters" list.

== Other versions ==
=== Loki ===
Hela appears in the four-issue series Loki, in which Loki has claimed leadership of Asgard. It is revealed that Hela was one of the Asgardians that helped him to the throne, but is now demanding payment for her assistance, along with the seductress Lorelei.

=== Marvel 2099 ===
In the Marvel 2099 series of stories, Alchemax tried transforming people into false versions of the Norse Aesir in order to gain advantage of the worldwide worship of these beings. A supporting character in Ravage 2099 named Tiana Sikoski, the love interest of the titular hero, was turned into Hela via technological means for this project.

=== Marvel Zombies ===
A zombified alternate universe version of Hela appears in Marvel Zombies.

Ultimate Hela, by David Finch

=== Ultimate Marvel ===
In the Ultimate Marvel universe, Thor travels to Valhalla to retrieve the soul of the deceased Valkyrie during the "Ultimatum" storyline. Hela tells him that if he manages to defeat her army, she will revive Valkyrie, but for a price. After her army is defeated, Hela reveals that the price is Thor's soul. He agrees, and the souls of Valkyrie and Captain America are released.

=== Ultimate Universe ===
In the Ultimate Universe imprint, Hela rules over Valhalla with her army of the undead. She employs Balder as her servant.

=== X-Men: The End ===
In X-Men: The End, an alternative reality focusing on the alternate future of the X-Men, Danielle Moonstar is separated and held in confinement in the mutant concentration camp Neverland. Materializing before Moonstar, Hela reminds her that she is a Valkyrie and as such, cherished by the Goddess of Death. After Moonstar invokes both Asgardian and Cheyenne chants, Hela revives her and grants her enhanced powers.

== In other media ==
=== Television ===
- Hela appears in The Avengers: Earth's Mightiest Heroes episode "The Fall of Asgard", voiced by Nika Futterman.
- Hela appears in the Avengers Assemble episode "Valhalla Can Wait", voiced by Vanessa Marshall. This version is the ruler of Valhalla.
- Hela appears in the Guardians of the Galaxy episode "Killer Queen", voiced by Kari Wahlgren. This version is the ruler of Niflheim whose powers are locked in a chest she is unable to open herself.

=== Film ===
Hela appears in Hulk vs. Thor, voiced by Janyse Jaud.

=== Marvel Cinematic Universe ===
Cate Blanchett as Hela in Thor: Ragnarok (2017)

Hela appears in media set in the Marvel Cinematic Universe (MCU), portrayed by Cate Blanchett. This version is the daughter of Odin and the first Asgardian to wield Mjolnir. Additionally, she is an agile yet formidable combatant who wields Necroswords and can summon various types of blades from within her cloak. Years prior, she helped Odin conquer the Nine Realms before he became alarmed by her ambitious and warmongering behavior. She was defeated in a battle that claimed all but one of the Valkyrie's lives and was trapped in an interdimensional prison in Hel, with Odin's life keeping her at bay.

- In the live-action film Thor: Ragnarok, once Odin dies in the present, Hela breaks free and thwarts an attack by her brothers Thor and Loki, during which she destroys Mjolnir and banishes them to Sakaar. Upon arriving in Asgard, she kills the Warriors Three and the majority of its forces before resurrecting her original army and companion Fenris as well as appointing Skurge as her Executioner. However, Thor and Loki joins forces with Valkyrie and Bruce Banner to escape Sakaar and return to Asgard, where Thor engages Hela in battle while Loki secretly revives Surtur to initiate Ragnarök. Hela attempts to fight Surtur, but is ultimately killed by his Twilight Sword.
- Alternate timeline variants of Hela appear in the second season of the Disney+ animated series What If... ?, voiced primarily by Blanchett while Liv Zamora voices a younger Hela. In the episode "What If... Hela Found the Ten Rings?", Odin destroys Mjolnir, strips Hela of her powers and crown, and banishs her to Earth instead of Hel. After landing in medieval China, she encounters Xu Wenwu and the Ten Rings before traveling to Ta Lo, where she trains in martial arts. When Odin comes to Earth to find her, she joins forces with Wenwu to defeat him and regain her crown. Recognizing her growth, Odin gives Hela Asgard's throne, after which she unites Asgard and the Ten Rings' forces. After reuniting with Fenris, she set out to free the Nine Realms, starting with stopping Thanos from taking a young Gamora. Additionally, Queen Hela of a Renaissance-themed universe and a "universe-killer" variant of Hela who was captured by Doctor Strange Supreme make minor appearances in the episodes "What If... the Avengers Assembled in 1602?" and "What If... Strange Supreme Intervened?" respectively.

=== Video games ===
- Hela makes a cameo appearance in Hsien Ko's ending in Ultimate Marvel vs. Capcom 3.
- Hela appears as a boss in the Nintendo DS version of Thor: God of Thunder.
- Hela appears as a boss in Marvel: Avengers Alliance.
- Hela appears as a playable character in Marvel Future Fight.
- Hela appears as a playable character in Lego Marvel Super Heroes 2, voiced by Kate Kennedy.
- Hela appears as a playable character in Marvel Puzzle Quest.
- Hela appears as a boss in Marvel Ultimate Alliance 3: The Black Order, voiced again by Nika Futterman.
- Hela appears in Marvel Future Revolution.
- Hela appears as a playable character in Marvel Rivals.
- Hela appears in Marvel Cosmic Invasion, voiced by Jennifer Hale.

=== Miscellaneous ===
Hela appears in Thor & Loki: Blood Brothers, voiced by Katharine Chesterton.
