= Venus (comic book) =

1948 American romance comic book series

- Venus issue 19 (1952), cover art Bill Everett

Publication information
- Publisher: Marvel Comics
- Genre: Superhero
- Publication date: 1948–1952
- No. of issues: 19
- Main character(s): Venus

Creative team
- Written by: Stan Lee
- Penciller(s): George Klein, Bill Everett
- Editor(s): Stan Lee

Venus is an American romance comic book published by Timely Comics (Marvel's predecessor) in the United States. Running for 19 issues from 1948 until 1952 it transformed over its run from its romance-led stories to finish as a science fiction and horror anthology. It is noted for introducing the Marvel character Venus and an early incarnation of Loki who would later become the nemesis of Marvel character Thor. The final three issues were published through Atlas Comics.

== Publication history ==
Venus was first published by Marvel Comics in August 1948. Issue one starred the title character Venus, and was made up of three stories, two written by Stan Lee and penciled by George Klein and Ken Bald and a third was a one-page Hey Look! filler written and drawn by Harvey Kurtzman. Issue six saw the first Marvel Comics appearance of the god Loki, here acting as a villainous foil to Venus.

From issue 10 the title took on a science fiction slant, and included stories by Russ Heath and Joe Maneely. By issue 11 the comic added the slogan "Strange Stories of the Supernatural" and though the tales still included Venus and other supporting characters, the comic began to morph into a horror/sci-fi anthology. In issue 12 Loki is joined by Thor to rescue Venus from the clutches of the evil sultan Khorak. By issue 17 the romance angle was dropped and Venus became a horror anthology, with the cover drawn by Bill Everett, and is classed as a bondage comic cover as it shows Venus chained to a dungeon wall. Everett supplied the covers for the final two issues as well as interior art, and issue nineteen is a classic pre-Comic Code horror book cover with Venus being embraced by a living skeleton.

== Bibliography ==
- Schoell, William (2014). The Horror Comics: Fiends, Freaks and Fantastic Creatures, 1940s-1980s. McFarland. ISBN 9780786470273.
