= Athena (Marvel Comics) =

Fictional deity from Marvel Comics

- Athena on the cover of The Incredible Hercules #127. Art by Dave Williams.

Publication information
- Publisher: Marvel Comics
- First appearance: The Mighty Thor #164 (May 1969)
- Created by: Stan Lee; Jack Kirby

In-story information
- Alter ego: Pallas Athena
- Species: Olympian
- Team affiliations: Olympian Gods; Council of Godheads
- Notable aliases: Minerva; Agent Sexton; Miranda Minerva
- Abilities: Superhuman strength, stamina, durability, speed, agility, reflexes, and intelligence; Divine empowerment; Magic manipulation; Regeneration; Shapeshifting; Immortality; Combat proficiency

Athena is a fictional deity appearing in American comic books published by Marvel Comics. She is based on the Greek Goddess of the same name.

== Publication history ==
Athena first appeared in The Mighty Thor #164 (May 1969), and was adapted from Greek mythology by writer Stan Lee and artist Jack Kirby.

== Fictional character biography ==
Athena is the daughter of Zeus and Metis, having emerged fully formed from her father's brow after Zeus consumed Metis in hopes of avoiding a male child who would succeed him, as he had his father. She took the place of the goddess of wisdom, war, and heroic endeavor in the Olympian pantheon. Her grey owl companion is named Pallas, a reference to her own name.

In modern times, Athena is responsible for Aegis gaining his superhuman powers from her gift of her Aegis breastplate.

Athena later battled Thor when Zeus had convinced her that the Avengers were enemies of Olympus. The battle ended when Thor saved her from a pool of molten metal in Hephaestus' workshop, and she realized that Thor was not her enemy. Athena, Hephaestus, and Venus went with the Avengers to heal the wounded Hercules, but Zeus was at his bedside and blasted them all with lightning. Zeus then forbade Athena and all Olympians from interfering with the Earth.

Athena appears in The Incredible Hercules, where she offers shelter to Hercules and Amadeus Cho at her estate in Vermont, and warning Hercules about both Ares, and Amadeus' potential for becoming good or evil. After Hercules and Amadeus ultimately make it to her estate, she warns them of the threat of the Secret Invasion, and takes them to San Francisco, to convene a meeting of Earth's various pantheons to discuss the threat. Following the God Squad's victory, and Mikaboshi's takeover of the Skrull slave deities, Athena is shown watching from her scrying pool, and she says that this is an even better result than she had planned for. She expresses no alarm or shock when Mikaboshi vows to get revenge on the Olympians. Athena is thus confirmed not to be a Skrull.

=== The Olympus Group ===
Hera and Pluto take over the Olympus Group, the modern day seat of power for the Olympians, and target Athena and Hercules. Amadeus leaves to uncover the truth behind his parents' death and his sister's disappearance, uncertain whether to trust her any longer. Subsequently, he learns that in fact Athena has been posing as an ally of his, former FBI Agent Sexton, and previously intervened to save his life from the murder attempt that killed his family. Amadeus gives Athena information about Hera's superweapon, Continuum.

Athena reveals to Amadeus that he is her choice to be the next Prince of Power, as the 'hero of the mind', as opposed to the hero of strength that Hercules represented. Further, as there cannot be more than one Prince of Power at any one time, this means that Hercules will soon meet his death. Amadeus vows to prevent this, even as they gather forces to mount an assault on New Olympus. Athena provides Aphrodite with information on her enemies, the Agents of Atlas, in exchange for her distracting Ares from joining the battle. Hephaestus forges a helmet channeling the power of the Medusa head, which Delphyne Gorgon uses to petrify Athena. After Zeus is killed, Athena is restored to life and begins calling herself Athena Panhellenios. After Hercules defeats Typhon within the alternate universe Hera's machine created, Athena reveals that Hercules must die so that Amadeus can take his place as Prince of Power, and, tearfully saying that she considers herself Hercules' real mother and that she fed him Hera's milk to increase his power, she destroys the machine, seemingly killing him.

During the Chaos War storyline, Athena brutally attacks Hercules with all her power, screaming that she exiled him to Hera's Continuum bubble universe because she sought to protect him from Amatsu-Mikaboshi. Hercules recreates himself with the full power of Skyfather, casually annihilating Athena. Though the combined efforts of Hercules, Amadeus, and their God Squad, bolstered by the aid of Earth's few surviving gods, are unable to stop Amatsu-Mikaboshi, they manage to trick Amatsu-Mikaboshi into returning the Continuum bubble reality back into the Primordial Void instead of their own universe, whereupon Athena appears to Hercules. With Zeus and Hera's restoration to high power, she is no longer the Olympian Godhead.

== Powers and abilities ==
Athena is highly adept at multiple forms of combat both armed and unarmed, possessing fighting skills eclipsing those of even gods as her brother Hercules. She possesses the conventional powers of the Olympian gods including superhuman strength, speed, agility, reflexes and stamina, agelessness, immunity to terrestrial diseases and harm from conventional means and a healing factor. Athena is significantly stronger than the average Olympian female and somewhat stronger than the average Olympian male. Even on Earth, after many months, Athena has shown herself to retain some degree of superhuman strength.

Athena possesses considerable magical abilities as an Olympian goddess. She can fly at great speed, transform herself and others, render herself and other beings invisible from mortal eyesight (for example when she was a secret participant in the Trojan War), create illusory images, and animate inanimate objects. Athena can also project mystical energy bolts, cross the distance between dimensions (as well as grant others unlimited passage to and from the realm of Olympus, as she did with Trey Rollins) and materialize objects, as well as one time empowering the mortal Prince Argive so he could strike Ares a near-fatal wound. Athena's ability to project mystical energy is considered among the greatest of the Olympians, surpassed only by a few special deities of her pantheon, such as Zeus, Hera, Pluto, Poseidon, and Apollo. She is also accompanied by her sacred pet owl, Pallas, who is either perched on her shoulder or deployed in the field to gather intelligence.

While she joined with Hercules and Amadeus Cho, she has yet to demonstrate such wide use of her godly abilities (possibly greatly weakened on Earth, as in the case of the other Olympians and most Asgardians), though she has most commonly used it to change from her regular mortal garb into full battle armor or disguise herself as humans (such as Agent Sexton) as well as summon her mace and shield. She has also shown herself capable of pinpointing the current location of the Aegis breastplate mentally, as if it was her "own skin", and once vanished into thin air, apparently teleporting herself away, after speaking with Amadeus Cho. Athena also bears the gift of foresight, which she used to predict the future birth of Amadeus and his eventual role as the Prince of Power, several millennia later, and is able to project images of such futures in thin air at will,

Athena possesses a scrying pool, enabling her to see into other dimensions, even into the dimensions of alien Skrull deities virtually unreachable, without detection.

Following the death of both Zeus and Hera, Athena has inherited Zeus's divine thunderbolt and is now capable of wielding it, making her the new Godhead for the remaining members of the Greek pantheon and the Queen of Olympus, raising her power to a much higher scale, potentially on a level to that of the other members of the Council Elite. Athena has since assumed the new godly title of Athena Panhellenios. Since then, Athena has shown herself capable of easily teleporting herself away, force back the gathered mourners at her temple, even Thor himself (whilst armed with her Thunderbolt), contact others on Earth from the Celestial Axis of the Council Elite by projecting her image in a scrying screen in midair and voice across planes of existence, and, even in a severely weakened state following the quenching of the Promethean Flame, was able to open a gateway between the Celestial Axis (meeting place of the Council Elite) and the Olympus Group headquarters on Earth.

== Reception ==
Various websites have assessed Athena as among the most powerful Olympic gods in Marvel Comics. In 2021, CBR ranked Athena third in their list of the ten smartest female Marvel characters.
