= Chaos War =

Marvel Comics storyline

- Chaos War #1 (Dec. 2010). Cover art by Ed McGuinness (penciler-inker) and Morry Hollowell (colorist)
- Publisher: Marvel Comics
- Publication date: December 2010 – March 2011
- Genre: Superhero; Crossover
Title(s)
Chaos War #1-5
Chaos War: Alpha Flight #1
Chaos War: Ares #1
Chaos War: Chaos King #1
Chaos War: Dead Avengers #1-3
Chaos War: God Squad #1
Chaos War: Thor #1-2
Chaos War: X-Men #1-2
Incredible Hulks #618-620
Marvel Encyclopedia #1
- Main character(s): Hercules; Thor; Hulk; Avengers; X-Men; Alpha Flight; Amatsu-Mikaboshi; God Squad

Creative team
- Writer(s): Greg Pak; Fred Van Lente

"Chaos War" is a Marvel Comics storyline that began publication in October 2010 across nine comic book series: the five-issue miniseries Chaos War, written by Greg Pak and Fred Van Lente, supplemented by seven branded miniseries or one-shot publications, and by three issues of Incredible Hulks, a temporary iteration of the long-running series The Incredible Hulk. It follows the "Incredible Hercules" storyline written by Pak and Van Lente.

The plot concerns a group of mythological gods and others assembled by the Greek god superhero Hercules to battle the Chaos King, the embodiment of the chaos and nothingness that preceded creation, who wants to wipe out all existence.

== Publication history ==
Marvel Comics announced the storyline in June 2010, with editor Jordan White saying that the Chaos King, "the living embodiment of the void before time and space began, has decided he liked things better before everything was" and is "on a mission to wipe out all of existence [by using] an army of alien space gods...." The primary opposition is the Greek god superhero Hercules leading the God Squad, an informal alliance of heroic characters. The Chaos King is in actuality Amatsu-Mikaboshi, a demonic god of evil.

The storyline began in Chaos War #1, the first issue of a core miniseries scheduled to run five issues (cover dates early Dec. 2010 - March 2011). It is written by Greg Pak and Fred Van Lente, with art by penciler Khoi Pham and inker Tom Palmer.

In addition, the story continues through the one-shot Chaos War: Alpha Flight #1 (Jan. 2011), by writer Jim McCann and penciler Reilly Brown, starring the titular Canadian superhero team; Chaos War: Chaos King #1 (Jan. 2011), by writer Brandon Montclare and artist Mike Kaluta; Chaos War: Dead Avengers #1-3 (Jan.-March 2011), by Van Lente and penciler Tom Grummett, featuring deceased and resurrected members of the superhero team the Avengers; Chaos War: Thor #1-2 (Jan.-Feb. 2011), by writer J. M. DeMatteis and penciler Brian Ching, starring the Norse god superhero; Chaos War: Ares, by writer Michael Avon Oeming and co-pencilers Stephen Segovia, starring the Greek god antihero Ares; Chaos War: God Squad #1 (Feb. 2011), by writer Marc Sumerak and penciler Daniel Panosian; Chaos War: X-Men #1-2 (Feb.-March 2011), by writers Chris Claremont and Louise Simonson and artist Doug Braithwaite, featuring the titular mutant superheroes; and the biweekly Incredible Hulks #618-620 (early and mid Feb. 2011), by Pak and Paul Pelletier.

== Plot summary ==
After the demonic dream-being Nightmare is killed by the Chaos King, an identity of the evil god Amatsu-Mikaboshi, humanity is rendered unconscious. (Note: Pak & Lente, Chaos War #1, Marvel Comics, October 2010.) Writer Fred Van Lente said Mikaboshi is based on the Shinto concept of the same name, "who[m] some see as the Japanese god of evil, but he really is a being that represents the polar opposite of the core values in the Shinto religion."

Mikaboshi's army of enslaved alien deities then invades the underworld realms of the gods Hades and Hela, resulting in the Greek and Norse dead having to fight for their existence. The demon-lord Daimon Hellstrom finds that the personification of Death has fled, unleashing the souls of the deceased on Earth. (Note: Pak & Lente, Chaos War #2, Marvel Comics, October 2010.)

The Greek god superhero Hercules, who had died but been resurrected with enhanced powers, assembles a group of heroes including Thor, the Silver Surfer, Venus, Galactus, and Sersi. This informal alliance is dubbed the "God Squad". (Note: Pak & Lente, Chaos War #3, Marvel Comics, November 2010.)

While Mikaboshi destroys the various pantheons of the mythological gods, Thor engages in battle with Mikaboshi's servant Glory. Thor barely survives, reverting to an amnesiac form of his human identity Donald Blake, and is cared for by a new character, Rebecca Steinhardt. (Note: Dematteis, Chaos War: Thor #1, Marvel Comics, November 2010.)

The Impossible Man and the demon lord Marduk Kurios individually confront Mikaboshi and are consumed. (Note: Monteclare, Chaos War: Chaos King #1, Marvel Comics, November 2010.) Several dead heroes, including Vision, Doctor Druid, Deathcry, Swordsman, Yellowjacket, and Captain Marvel, return to Earth and defeat Mikaboshi's supervillain accomplices, Grim Reaper and Nekra, with most of the group being killed in the battle. (Note: Lente, Chaos War: Dead Avengers #1-3, Marvel Comics, November - December 2010.) Deceased members of the Canadian superhero team Alpha Flight similarly return to Earth, and, with living members, fight Amatsu-Mikaboshi and the Great Beasts. (Note: McCann, Chaos War: Alpha Flight #1, Marvel Comics, November 2010.)

The mystic Doctor Strange, formerly Earth's Sorcerer Supreme, tasks the Hulk and others to find the dead Marlo Chandler, who contains part of the essence of the personification of Death. Meanwhile, Brian Banner, the dead father of the Hulk, is resurrected as a Hulk-like creature and fights his son. (Note: Pak, Incredible Hulks #618-620, Marvel Comics, December 2010 - January 2011.) A number of dead members of the X-Men also return, seeking a prophetic diary that holds information for defeating Mikaboshi. The dead X-Men manage to prevent Carrion Crow from claiming the diary at the cost of some of their lives. (Note: Claremont, Simonson & Braithwaite, Chaos War: X-Men #1-2, Marvel Comics, December 2010 - January 2011.)

Hercules' sister, the Greek goddess Athena, believing the current reality is irreparably metaphysically corrupt, and wishing to start fresh with a new Big Bang, is revealed as Mikaboshi's accomplice. The primeval Earth goddess Gaea and her daughter Pele, the goddess of fire, summon the surviving gods to Hawaii. The young genius Amadeus Cho calculates that Mikaboshi by now has consumed most of the multiverse, and urges humanity to escape to an unpopulated and sealed-off continuum which he knows of. Hercules argues to go down fighting, and is confronted by Athena. But Gaea and Pele destroy and recreate Hercules as a maintainer of the cycle of life, and Hercules annihilates his sibling. (Note: Pak & Lente, Chaos War #4, Marvel Comics, December 2010.)

While the Hulk and his allies, the God Squad, Alpha Flight, and the surviving Dead Avengers fight Amatsu-Mikaboshi's forces, Cho and Galactus work on a machine that will transfer Earth to the sealed-off continuum. Not wanting to allow them to seal off the Earth forever, Hercules throws Mikaboshi inside it, sealing him off from all of reality instead. He then restores all that Mikaboshi had destroyed by expending his entire power, returning to being a "regular" mortal in the process. (Note: Pak & Lente, Chaos War #5, Marvel Comics, January 2011.)

== Reception ==
Critical reviews for Chaos War #1 were mostly positive. Doug Zawisza of Comic Book Resources gave it four stars out of five, saying it "could only be made better if it were extra-sized". IGN rated it 7.0 out of 10, calling it "a fine read that has its problems. If you're a fan of [Hercules] then you'll love this escalated continuation of Hercules' story. And for those new to it all, I still recommend giving it a chance [since] the epic nature of the story may sway you to read Herc's quality back catalog".

Zawisza was equally impressed with issue #2, and IGN, though critical of the artwork, rated it 8.0, remarking, "While I am still not a fan of Khoi Pham's artwork in this series, the story is being told well enough in every aspect that it is hard not to recommend the book".

The third issue met with mixed reactions. Greg McElhatton of Comic Book Resources gave it two out of five stars, saying, "A book involving Hercules and the other pantheons of gods fighting off the Chaos King should have been a lot of fun, but this is just a mish-mash", and that, "It doesn't help that Khoi Pham and Thomas Palmer's art is looking equally uninspired here". IGN, conversely, gave it another 8.0 and bringing up a heretofore unmentioned "pacing problem" with the previous issues, and calling it artist Pham's "strongest issue so far".

Reception for the fourth issue was somewhat better with Doug Zawisza of Comic Book Resources giving it three and half out of five stars, stating "Chaos War story started off with a really loud crash, a deafening noise that threatened all who heard it, but the story since has slowed considerably". Jesse Schedeen of IGN was less impressed giving the issue a 6.5 out of 10, commenting that "Chaos War has had its ups and downs so far. Sadly, it doesn't appear to be shaping up to be the fitting conclusion to the Incredible Hercules saga it should have been".

The fifth and final issue was also met with mixed reactions. Zawisza of Comic Book Resources gave it another four out of five stars stating, "This book was big, loud, comic book fun. Sure, it may not have warranted all of the tie-ins, crossovers, and pop-outs it got, but at its core, it provided a wild adventure that changed the landscape of the Marvel Universe". However, Dan Iverson of IGN gave the issue its lowest rating, a 5.5 out of 10 remarking, "If anything can be said for Chaos War #5 it is that it truly felt like the end of the Herc and Cho story, with both fulfilling their destinies. Fans of The Incredible Hercules will at least be able to glean some sort of nostalgia from the ending... but it isn't enough to justify picking the book up at the $3.99 price point".

== Collected editions ==
Title	Material collected	Published date	ISBN
Chaos War	Chaos War #1-5	April 2011	978-0785151319
Chaos War: Avengers	Chaos War: Dead Avengers #1-3, Chaos War: Thor #1-2, Chaos War: Ares #1	May 2011	978-0785155584
Chaos War: Incredible Hulks	Incredible Hulks #618-622 and material from Incredible Hulks #614-617	June 2011	978-0785151579
Chaos War: X-Men	Chaos War: X-Men #1-2, Chaos War: Alpha Flight #1, Chaos War: Chaos King #1, Chaos War: The God Squad #1	June 2011	978-0785153153
