= Pluto (Marvel Comics) =

Fictional deity in the Marvel Comics Universe

- Pluto as depicted in The Defenders vol. 2 #4 (June 2001). Art by Erik Larsen.

Publication information
- Publisher: Marvel Comics
- First appearance: Thor #127 (April 1966)
- Created by: Adapted from the mythological Hades by Stan Lee (writer); Jack Kirby (artist)

In-story information
- Alter ego: Hades
- Species: Olympian
- Team affiliations: Gods of Olympus; Death Gods
- Notable aliases: Hades, Hayden P. Hellman, Aidoneus, Mr. Pluto, Dis
- Abilities: Superhuman strength, stamina and durability High-level magical energies Regenerative healing factor Energy-draining touch Invisibility via helmet Immortality; Ability to command the spirits of the dead under his dominion

Pluto is a fictional deity appearing in American comic books published by Marvel Comics. The character is based on the Greco-Roman god of the same name.

== Publication history ==
Pluto first appeared in Thor #127 (April 1966), and was created by writer Stan Lee and artist Jack Kirby.

== Fictional character biography ==
Pluto is the Olympian god of the Underworld, death, and the dead, and is the Monarch of Hades. Much of the character's story parallels that of traditional Greek mythology. To wit, after defeating their father Cronus, Pluto and his brothers Zeus and Neptune as well as his sisters Hera, Hestia and Demeter drew lots to divide Cronus' empire among them. Pluto gained control of the Underworld as the judge of the dead. In the Marvel Universe, Pluto is depicted a scheming god who plans to overthrow Zeus.

His most infamous act is when he takes Zeus' and Demeter's daughter, his niece Persephone (also known as Kore) as his wife against her will. This event goes on to cause him some dismal failures in the future; for instance the Avengers once defeat him when Persephone issues an edict against him. He also became a major enemy of Hercules, when the young Hercules captures Pluto's dog Cerberus as one of his Twelve Labours.

When worship of the Greek gods dies out, Zeus forbids Pluto to take anymore souls into his underworld. He became bitter and begins a long history of plotting against his more powerful brother. After numerous failures, Zeus decrees that Pluto can only leave the Underworld if he finds someone willing to rule in his place. Pluto travels to Earth and disguises himself as Mr. Hellman, a film producer, and invites Hercules to make a film about himself. Hercules signs the contract into ruling the underworld unaware of that the contract actually binds him to serve as ruler of the Olympian underworld in Pluto's place, as he believes the film is about him conquering the Netherworld by defeating Pluto. Thor learns of Pluto's deception and challenges him on Hercules' behalf. Pluto sends Thor into the Olympian Underworld where his goal is to defeat Pluto's minions. After witnessing Thor's remarkable progress which destroys much of the Underworld which Pluto has spent centuries building, Pluto becomes disgusted and destroys the contract, releasing Hercules. Pluto next invaded Earth with mutates from an alternate future. He clashed with Thor, and was thwarted by Zeus.

Pluto attempts to invade both Olympus, home of the Greek gods and Asgard, home of Thor and his fellow Asgardians on numerous occasions, each without success. Pluto forms an alliance with Ares, his nephew and Olympian god of war, and attempts to foment war between Olympus and Asgard, but is defeated in combat by Thor. Pluto eventually makes an alliance with other death gods and demons. He allies himself with Hippolyte, the queen of the Amazons, and Ares, who also believes that Zeus refusal to force the humans to worship them is a mistake. However Hippolyte only wants Hercules to be hers and has no interest in Pluto's desire to be worshipped by humanity again. Pluto attempts to sponsor the divorce of Hercules and Hebe to marry Hercules to Hippolyte as well as Ares to marry Venus. According to Olympian law, Hercules and Venus are not allowed to fight their partners when Hippolyte and Ares assist Pluto in conquering Olympus. However, this plan was exposed by Ghost Rider, and ultimately fails as Zeus, after some hesitation at first, finally forbids the unions.

Pluto later allied with Ulik and Loki against Thor. Pluto sought to create a "nether-hole" that would destroy the universe. He fought and defeated the Stranger, but was defeated by the Thing and the Hulk, whom the Stranger had brought with him. Pluto allied in a scheme with other death gods and demons. He was devoured by Demogorge, but released by Thor. Pluto later held the Avengers prisoner in Tartarus at Zeus's behest, but the Avengers battled their way out and escaped.

To circumvent Zeus' decree, Pluto attempts to conquer Earth with the help of Lorelei. Pluto transforms Lorelei into a copy of the Valkyrie and drains her of her power and memories. He then uses the absorbed power to take control of the real Valkyrie to turn Earth into a realm of the dead itself. The Valkyrie's presence masks his own influence and Zeus' decree still allows Pluto to annex other realms of the dead. Pluto is eventually stopped by the Defenders who bring Lorelei along, thinking her to be their teammate. The clash of the two Valkyries releases Lorelei from the spell and together they turned on Pluto and ended his plan.

With the disappearance of the Asgardians after Ragnarök, Zeus fears for the continued existence of the Olympians as well and decides that they should mingle among humanity to hide from any force threatening them. Hades (Pluto) becomes a mafia-inspired crime lord, joking that he is still a lord of the underworld. The Olympians eventually return to Olympus, where they come under siege by the Japanese god Amatsu-Mikaboshi.

=== The Olympus Group ===
Hera and Pluto take over the Olympus Group, the modern day seat of power for the Olympians, through the shares inherited by Hera from Zeus and by buying out Poseidon. They declare the company has a new major goal: the deaths of Athena and Hercules. Pluto appears with the Olympus Group when Norman Osborn's Avengers storm one of the Group's warehouses. There, Pluto grants Daken an unsolicited prophecy of the day, month, and gruesomeness of Daken's death. Daken attacks Pluto to little effect, and is in turn overwhelmed by Pluto's army of mafioso undead.

Hercules and Amadeus Cho enter Pluto's underworld, its new entrance being an Atlantic City casino where deceased heroes and villains can try betting their way into resurrection. There, they find Pluto has begun a trial with Zeus as the accused, ostensibly in the name of all his victims in Hades, with 501 deceased jurors holding court in a mockery of Athenian justice. Pluto hopes that removing Zeus will increase his own power within the pact made in prehistory among Pluto, Poseidon and Zeus to divide creation into their respective realms. He tries to prevent Hercules from interfering by offering him the soul of Hercules' adoptive father, who tells Hercules to rescue Zeus instead. Zeus is eventually found guilty, and submits to his sentence: he drinks from the Lethe river, erasing his memory, and is reborn on Earth as a child. With Zeus removed from their clutches, the dead turn against Pluto immediately, as he is now the sole accessible cause of their suffering.

Pluto subsequently reappears at Hercules' funeral, in the company of Athena (now the leader of the Olympians), Apollo, Poseidon, and Hebe.

During Chaos War, Pluto is seen arguing with Persephone when Hela appears telling him that Amatsu-Mikaboshi is attacking the realms of the dead. Pluto releases various spirits, both blessed and damned, to fight for his realm, freeing Zeus, Hera, Ares, various mortal heroes (including Banshee, Swordsman, and Yellowjacket) and various mortal villains (including Abomination and Iron Monger).

== Powers and abilities ==
Pluto is a member of the race of immortals known as the gods of Olympus. Among his race, his superhuman strength is equaled only by Neptune and Ares, and is exceeded only by Zeus and Hercules. Pluto's body is also virtually tireless, granting him almost limitless stamina. Pluto has proven capable of withstanding powerful impact forces, temperature extremes, and powerful energy blasts all without sustaining damage. Like all other members of his race, Pluto is immortal in the sense that he is immune to the effects of aging. He has not aged since reaching adulthood and is also immune to all known diseases. It would take damage that severely discorporated his body to cause his physical death. He is able to recover from damage with a greater speed and extent than most other members of his race.

Pluto controls vast magical powers, equaled only by Neptune, and second only to Zeus amongst Olympians, and has faced Earth's Sorcerer Supreme, Doctor Strange, in direct magical combat. Pluto can generate powerful energy blasts; temporarily increase his physical attributes; bestow superhuman powers upon other beings or objects; manipulate time on a considerable scale, from simply accessing other eras (including alternate futures) or creating impenetrable time funnels; create highly durable force fields; create weapons of mystical flame, whose touch can paralyze and harm an opponent, even gods such as Hercules, and is capable of interdimensional teleportation.

As a Death God, Pluto has a pact with Death that allows him to claim the souls of any worshipper of the Greco-Roman Gods, and order those under his command. He is capable of draining the energy and life-force from those that he touches, even other gods. The various Death Gods can either act as allies or competitors depending on the situation. Pluto is more powerful within Hades than in other realms, due to his ability to commune with and manipulate the energies of the Underworld. On Earth, he can command armies of undead.

Although he typically prefers to use minions, Pluto is a formidable hand-to-hand combatant, skilled in the use of battleaxes and swords made of the enchanted, virtually indestructible, "adamantine" (from which the fictional metal, adamantium, was named), and can use them to channel his powers. He wears Olympian battle armor made of the same material.

Pluto possesses a helmet that renders him invisible and undetectable, even to fellow gods; he sometimes rides a mystical chariot capable of flight and travelling to other realms, and he has made occasional use of potent mystical items such as the Gem of Tartarus, which encased the four original Defenders within an enchanted pillar, though the Gem itself was fragile and swiftly shattered.

== Reception ==
- In 2019, Comic Book Resources (CBR) ranked Hades 8th in their "Marvel Comics: The 10 Most Powerful Olympians" list.
- In 2021, CBR ranked Hades 4th in their "Marvel: 10 Most Powerful Olympians" list.
- In 2022, Sportskeeda ranked Hades 7th in their "10 Best Greek Gods from Marvel Comics" list.
- In 2022, Screen Rant included Pluto in their "10 Most Powerful Olympian Gods In Marvel Comics" list.

== In other media ==
- Pluto appears in The Marvel Super Heroes episode "The Power of Pluto", voiced by Henry Comor.
- Pluto appears in the Hulk and the Agents of S.M.A.S.H. episode "The Tale of Hercules", voiced by Robert Englund.
