= Zeus (Marvel Comics) =

Marvel Comics fictional character

- Zeus as seen on the cover of Thor Annual #8 (1979). Art by Keith Pollard and Bob Layton.

Publication information
- Publisher: Marvel Comics
- First appearance: (as Jupiter) Venus #5 (June 1949) (as Zeus) Journey into Mystery Annual #1 (October 1965)
- Created by: Stan Lee; Jack Kirby

In-story information
- Full name: Zeus Panhellenios
- Species: Olympian
- Team affiliations: Olympian Gods; Council of Godheads
- Notable aliases: Jupiter, Jove (names given to him in ancient Rome), Taranis (Celtic name), Tinis (Etruscan name), Iupiter Optimus Maximus, Diespiter Optimus Maximus, Mister Z
- Abilities: Superhuman agility, endurance, longevity; Superspeed; Superhuman strength; Electricity manipulation; Healing factor; Precognition

Zeus is a fictional deity, appearing in American comic books published by Marvel Comics. The character is based on the god Zeus in Greek mythology.

Russell Crowe portrays Zeus in the Marvel Cinematic Universe film Thor: Love and Thunder.

== Publication history ==
The comic version of Zeus is based on the god of the same name from Greek mythology. Zeus first appears in Venus #5 (June 1949), and was adapted by Stan Lee and Jack Kirby.

== Fictional character biography ==
Zeus is the youngest son of the Titans Cronus and Rhea, the children of sky god Ouranos and elder goddess Gaea (also known as "Mother Earth"). The infant Zeus was secretly entrusted to his grandmother Gaea for safekeeping and hidden in the Caves of Dicte on Crete's Aegean Hill.

After the Hyborian Age, the ancient Greek civilization began to rise, so Zeus made the Olympian gods known to them to gain their worship. During the war of Troy, Zeus battled Thor who had accidentally been transported there. Hades deplored the decree from Zeus, and challenged Zeus' supremacy many times.

Zeus breaks up a fight between Hercules and Thor with his thunderbolt, but cannot break Hercules' contract with Pluto.

Zeus later battles Amatsu-Mikaboshi, who had kidnapped Ares' son Alexander, and is seemingly killed. During the "Dark Reign" storyline, the spirit of Zeus is revealed to have been captured by Pluto and held in Hades. After being put on trial, Zeus willingly drinks from the River Lethe, making him lose his memory and renounce his crown to Pluto.

During the "Chaos War" storyline, Zeus, Hera, and Ares are among the dead individuals who Pluto releases to help defend the underworld from Amatsu-Mikaboshi. After Hercules defeats Amatsu-Mikaboshi, he restores Zeus along with the rest of the universe.

While sleeping with another woman, Zeus was depowered by Hera because of his infidelity and womanizing. He regains his powers after helping Hercules defeat Baba Yaga, a witch who absorbs the magic of the artifacts to regain her youth.

Following the events of Avengers: No Surrender, Nyx escapes imprisonment and kills the Olympians, including Zeus.

Zeus is once again reborn, with a much more aggressive and belligerent attitude, thanks to the eternal cosmic cycle of death and rebirth. He leads his fellow gods in a war of conquest and destruction, until they are stopped by the Guardians of the Galaxy.

Zeus clashes with Thor once again thanks to the manipulations of Loki, going so far as to fight alongside Nyx in an effort to get his revenge. Despite this, he is outmatched by the Allfather-empowered Norse god, and has his energies drained by Thor.

== Reception ==
- In 2019, Comic Book Resources (CBR) ranked Zeus 2nd in their "Marvel Comics: The 10 Most Powerful Olympians" list.
- In 2021, CBR ranked Zeus 2nd in their "Marvel: 10 Most Powerful Olympians" list.
- In 2022, Sportskeeda ranked Zeus 3rd in their "10 best Greek gods from Marvel comics " list.
- In 2022, Screen Rant included Zeus in their "10 Most Powerful Olympian Gods In Marvel Comics" list.

== In other media ==
=== Television ===
- Zeus appears in the "Mighty Thor" segment of The Marvel Super Heroes, voiced by Claude Rae.
- Zeus appears in The Super Hero Squad Show episode "Support Your Local Sky-Father!", voiced by Travis Willingham.
- An alternate universe variant of the Marvel Cinematic Universe incarnation of Zeus (see below) appears in the What If...? episode "What If... Howard the Duck Got Hitched?", voiced by Darin De Paul.

=== Film ===
Zeus appears in Thor: Love and Thunder, portrayed by Russell Crowe. This version is the hedonistic leader of the Council of Godheads. In an original deleted scene, Zeus instructs Thor in using his thunderbolt and tells him to find the Gates of Eternity.
