= Modular Man =

Marvel Comics supervillain

- The Modular Man as depicted in Marvel Team-Up #90 (January 1980). Art by Al Milgrom (penciller) and Jack Abel (inker).

Publication information
- Publisher: Marvel Comics
- First appearance: The Rampaging Hulk #2 (April 1977)
- Created by: John Warner and Val Mayerik

In-story information
- Alter ego: Stephen Weems
- Species: Human mutate
- Team affiliations: Roxxon Energy Corporation
- Abilities: Reconfigurable body; Superhuman strength and durability; Microwave absorption

The Modular Man (Stephen Weems) is a supervillain appearing in American comic books published by Marvel Comics. He first appeared in Rampaging Hulk #2 (April 1977) and was created by John Warner and Val Mayerik.

== Fictional character biography ==
Stephen Weems was a physicist employed by the Brand Corporation (a subsidiary of Roxxon Energy Corporation) to perform experiments using microwaves to induce molecular dissolution. An accident destabilized his body and gave him the ability to transform it at will. However, he was forced to wear an exoskeleton to prevent his body from separating entirely.

An organization known as The Conspiracy promised to cure Weems of his affliction if he aided them in their plans. They gave him the code name "Modular Man" because of his ability to take his body apart and put it back together without ill effect.

Agents of The Conspiracy mailed parts of Weems' body in several packages to Delenor Hospital, where fellow agent Killer Shrike was comatose after a fight with Ulysses Bloodstone. Members of the Conspiracy reassembled Weems in the hospital's mail room.

Weems kidnapped Killer Shrike and brought him to his masters in the Conspiracy. Unfortunately, the Conspiracy's leadership had been killed while attempting to acquire the Hellfire Helix. Weems managed to make Killer Shrike conscious again, but could not cure his amnesia. Killer Shrike promised to help Weems if he would reveal the Shrike's past to him. The two stole scientific equipment from labs at Empire State University, and came into conflict with Spider-Man and Beast.

Weems and Killer Shrike took a helicopter to the Empire State Building prior to a television broadcast that would provide the necessary microwaves for Weems to restore himself. This initially caused Weems great pain, but then, instead of curing him, caused him to increase in size and power. He revealed that his true intent had never been to be cured, but to transform into a powerful energy creature. Spider-Man and Beast then appear and use Shrike's energy gauntlets to overload Weems' exoskeleton, causing him to dissolve.

== Powers and abilities ==
The Modular Man possesses immense strength and durability, as well as the ability to reconfigure his own body in any way he wishes. He could absorb microwave radiation to vastly grow in size, but cannot survive without his exoskeleton. Weems carries numerous, but detachable weapons at his disposal, such as a gas gun and others that are unrevealed.
