= Justin Murphy =

Justin Murphy may refer to

- Justin Murphy (comics), creator of comics and graphic novels
- Justin Murphy (rugby league), Australian rugby league footballer
- Justin Murphy (Australian rules footballer), Australian rules footballer
