= Marvel Presents =

- Marvel Presents #3 (Feb. 1976). Art by Al Milgrom and John Romita Sr.

Publication information
- Publisher: Marvel Comics
- Genre: Superhero
- Publication date: October 1975–August 1977
- No. of issues: 12
- Main character(s): Guardians of the Galaxy

Creative team
- Written by: List: Steve Gerber, Mary Skrenes, Roger Stern, John Warner
- Penciller(s): List: Pat Boyette, Howard Chaykin, Al Milgrom, Sonny Trinidad, Mike Vosburg
- Inker(s): List: Terry Austin, Pablo Marcos, Bob McLeod, Bob Wiacek
- Editor(s): Archie Goodwin, Len Wein, Marv Wolfman

Marvel Presents was an American comic book anthology series published by Marvel Comics. Twelve issues were published from October 1975 to August 1977.

== Publication history ==
=== Bloodstone ===
Marvel Presents began publication with an October 1975 cover date. The first two issues featured Ulysses Bloodstone, a character created by Len Wein, Marv Wolfman, and John Warner for the Where Monsters Dwell series. Mike Vosburg was the artist assigned to the first installment, and then Pat Boyette was to draw the rest of the series. Where Monsters Dwell was cancelled and "Bloodstone" was moved to Marvel Presents. The first two chapters were finished and were printed in issue #1. Due to the publishing delays, Boyette was unavailable for the second issue, which was drawn by Sonny Trinidad instead.

=== Guardians of the Galaxy ===
Marvel Presents is notable for giving the original Guardians of the Galaxy their first regular series, from issues #3-12, by Steve Gerber and Al Milgrom. Roger Stern replaced Gerber as writer with issue #10. Issue #7 (Nov. 1976) depicted an obvious sex act in a Comics Code-approved comic book, between Vance Astro and Nikki. It presumably made it past the Code because Nikki was outside her physical body and Vance was in the mind of the Topographical Man, a humanoid heavenly body. The series was cancelled with issue #12 (August 1977) due to low sales.

=== The issues ===
| Issue | Date | Title | Writer | Pencils | Notes |
|---|---|---|---|---|---|
| #1 | October 1975 | Dweller From the Depths! | John Warner | Mike Vosburg; Pat Boyette | First appearance of Ulysses Bloodstone |
| #2 | December 1975 | Hellfire Helix Hex! | John Warner | Sonny Trinidad | |
| #3 | February 1976 | Just Another Planet Story! | Steve Gerber | Al Milgrom | Contains a text story on the history of Earth-691 |
| #4 | April 1976 | Into the Maw of Madness! | Steve Gerber | Al Milgrom | Contains a text story on the history of Earth-691; first appearance of Nikki |
| #5 | June 1976 | Planet of the Absurd! | Steve Gerber | Al Milgrom; Howard Chaykin | |
| #6 | August 1976 | The Topographical Man | Steve Gerber | Al Milgrom | |
| #7 | November 1976 | Embrace the Void! | Steve Gerber | Al Milgrom | |
| #8 | December 1976 | Once Upon a Time... the Silver Surfer! | Roger Stern | Al Milgrom | Contains a flashback reprinted from Silver Surfer #2 (October 1968) |
| #9 | February 1977 | Breaking Up is Death to Do! | Steve Gerber; Mary Skrenes | Al Milgrom | |
| #10 | April 1977 | Death-Bird Rising! | Roger Stern | Al Milgrom | |
| #11 | June 1977 | At War With Arcturus! | Roger Stern | Al Milgrom | |
| #12 | August 1977 | The Shipyard of Deep Space! | Roger Stern | Al Milgrom | |

== Collected editions ==
- Marvel Firsts: The 1970s Vol. 3 includes Marvel Presents #1 and #3, 380 pages, June 2012, ISBN 978-0785163824
- Guardians of the Galaxy: The Power of Starhawk includes Marvel Presents #3–12, 192 pages, July 2009, ISBN 978-0785137887
- Guardians of the Galaxy: Tomorrow's Avengers includes Marvel Presents #3–12, 368 pages, January 2013, ISBN 978-0785166870
