= Marvel Classics Comics =

American comics magazine

- Cover, issue #1 (Dr. Jekyll and Mr. Hyde). Art by Gil Kane and Dan Adkins.

Publication information
- Publisher: Marvel Comics
- Schedule: monthly
- Format: Ongoing series
- Genre: science fiction, horror, suspense, adventure
- Publication date: Jan. 1976 – Dec. 1978
- No. of issues: 36

Creative team
- Written by: Otto Binder, Kin Platt, Irwin Shapiro, Doug Moench, John Warner
- Artist(s): Alex Niño, Rudy Nebres, E. R. Cruz, Dino Castrillo, Jess Jodloman, Yong Montaño, Rudy Mesina
- Editor(s): Vincent Fago (issues #1-12); John Warner (issues #13-24); Roger Slifer (issues #25–30); David Anthony Kraft; Ralph Macchio

Marvel Classics Comics was an American comics magazine which ran from 1976 until 1978. It specialized in adaptations of literary classics such as Moby-Dick, The Three Musketeers, and The Iliad. It was Marvel Comics' attempt to pick up the mantle of Classics Illustrated, which stopped publishing in 1971. Thirty-six issues of Marvel Classics Comics were published, 12 of them being reprints of another publisher's work.

== Overview ==
Classics Illustrated, created by Albert Kanter, began publication in 1941 and finished its first run in 1971, producing 169 issues. Editor Vincent Fago's Pendulum Now Age Classics, published by Pendulum Press, began adapting literary classics into black-and-white comics beginning in 1973. The Pendulum series was the direct antecedent to Marvel Classics Comics — in fact, the Marvel series' first 12 issues were colorized reprints of selected Pendulum comics, with new covers. These issues featured writers like Otto Binder, Kin Platt, and Irwin Shapiro doing the adaptations; with art by Filipino artists Alex Niño, Rudy Nebres, and E. R. Cruz, among others.

Issues in the Marvel Classics Comics series were 52 pages with no advertisements. Most of the titles in the series had previously been adapted in Classics Illustrated, but two new ones were added: Bram Stoker's Dracula (#9, a Pendulum Press reprint) and H. Rider Haggard's She (#24).

After the first 12 reprint issues, adaptations were handled by writers like Doug Moench and John Warner (Warner was the series editor from issue #13–24). Many issues were drawn by Dino Castrillo; artists like Jess Jodloman, Yong Montaño, and Rudy Mesina also had multiple contributions. Ernie Chan was in charge of most of the early covers. Michael Golden's first work for Marvel Comics was "The Cask of Amontillado", a backup story in Marvel Classics Comics #28 (1977) adapting an Edgar Allan Poe short story.

In 1984, Marvel teamed with Fisher-Price to re-issue a selection of Marvel Classics Comics titles in toy stores, packaged with a cassette tape of the book.

In 2007, Marvel re-entered the literary adaptations arena with their imprint Marvel Illustrated.

== Issue list ==
=== Original run (1976-1978) ===
1. Dr. Jekyll and Mr. Hyde, adapted by Kin Platt and Nestor Redondo; cover by Gil Kane and Dan Adkins
2. The Time Machine, adapted by Otto Binder and Alex Niño; cover by Gil Kane
3. The Hunchback of Notre-Dame, adapted by Naunerle Farr and Jun Lofamia; cover by Gil Kane and Klaus Janson
4. Twenty Thousand Leagues Under the Seas, adapted by Otto Binder and Romy Gaboa & Ernie Patricio; cover by Gil Kane and Dan Adkins
5. Black Beauty, adapted by Naunerle Farr and Rudy Nebres; cover by Gil Kane and Dan Adkins
6. Gulliver's Travels, adapted by John Norwood Fago and E. R. Cruz; cover by Gil Kane and Dan Adkins
7. Tom Sawyer, adapted by Irwin Shapiro and E. R. Cruz; cover by Gil Kane and Frank Giacoia
8. Moby-Dick, adapted by Irwin Shapiro and Alex Niño; cover by Gil Kane and Mike Esposito
9. Dracula, adapted by Naunerle Farr and Nestor Redondo; cover by Gil Kane and Tom Palmer
10. The Red Badge of Courage, adapted by Irwin Shapiro and E. R. Cruz; author portrait by Dan Adkins
11. The Mysterious Island, adapted by Otto Binder and E. R. Cruz; cover by Gil Kane; author portrait by Dan Adkins
12. The Three Musketeers, adapted by Naunerle Farr and Alex Niño; cover by Gil Kane and Dan Adkins; author portrait by Dan Adkins
13. The Last of the Mohicans,adapted by Doug Moench and Sonny Trinidad; cover by Gil Kane and Dan Adkins
14. The War of the Worlds, adapted by Chris Claremont and Yong Montaño; cover by Gil Kane and Dave Cockrum
15. Treasure Island, adapted by Bill Mantlo and Dino Castrillo; cover by Yong Montaño
16. Ivanhoe, adapted by Doug Moench and Jess Jodloman; cover by Gil Kane and Dan Adkins
17. The Count of Monte Cristo, adapted by Chris Claremont and Dino Castrillo
18. The Odyssey, adapted by Bill Mantlo and Jess Jodloman; cover and author portrait by Ernie Chan
19. Robinson Crusoe,adapted by Doug Moench and Philippine Tribe (Steve Gan & Sonny Trinidad & Yong Montaño); cover by John Buscema and Ernie Chan
20. Frankenstein, adapted by John Warner and Dino Castrillo; cover by Gene Colan and Ernie Chan
21. Master of the World, adapted by Doug Moench and Dino Castrillo; cover by Gil Kane and Bob Wiacek
22. Food of the Gods, adapted by Doug Moench and Sonny Trinidad; cover by cover by Gil Kane and Dan Adkins
23. The Moonstone, adapted by Don McGregor and Dino Castrillo; cover by Ernie Chan
24. She, adapted by John Warner, Dino Castrillo & Rod Santiago; cover by Gil Kane and Rudy Nebres
25. The Invisible Man, adapted by Doug Moench and Dino Castrillo & Rudy Mesina
26. Iliad, adapted by Elliot S. Maggin and Yong Montano; cover by Ernie Chan; character portrait by Paul Gulacy
27. Kidnapped, adapted by Doug Moench, Pete Ijauco & Sonny Trinidad; cover by John Romita, Jr., and Pablo Marcos; author portrait by Howard Chaykin
28. The Pit and the Pendulum, adapted by Doug Moench, Rudy Mesina, Yong Montaño, Rod Santiago, and Michael Golden; cover by Gene Colan
29. The Prisoner of Zenda, adapted by Doug Moench and Rico Rival; cover by John Romita, Jr., and Pablo Marcos
30. Arabian Nights, adapted by Doug Moench and Yong Montaño; cover by Gene Colan and Frank Giacoia
31. The First Men in the Moon (cover mistakenly attributes authorship of the original novel to Jules Verne), adapted by Don McGregor and Rudy Mesina; cover by Alan Weiss
32. White Fang, adapted by Doug Moench and Philippine Tribe (Steve Gan & Sonny Trinidad & Yong Montaño); cover by Gil Kane and Frank Giacoia
33. The Prince and the Pauper, adapted by Don McGregor and New Tribe; cover by John Romita Jr. and Tony DeZuniga
34. Robin Hood, adapted by Doug Moench and Rudy Mesina & Alfredo Alcala; cover by Alfredo Alcala
35. Alice in Wonderland, adapted by Doug Moench and Frank Bolle; cover by Frank Bolle
36. A Christmas Carol, adapted by Doug Moench and Diverse Hands; cover by Bob Hall

=== Fisher-Price re-issue (1984) ===
- Alice in Wonderland
- The Arabian Nights
- Frankenstein
- Robin Hood
- Robinson Crusoe
- Treasure Island

== See also ==
- Marvel Illustrated
- Classics Illustrated
- Graphic Classics
- Pendulum Press
- PAICO Classics — Indian series
- Classical Comics — British publisher
- SelfMadeHero — British publisher
- Les Grands Classiques de la littérature en bande dessinée
