= Doctor Druid =

Marvel Comics superhero

- Promotional image of Doctor Druid.

Publication information
- Publisher: Marvel Comics
- First appearance: As Dr. Droom: Amazing Adventures #1 (June 1961); As Dr. Druid: Weird Wonder Tales #19 (September 1976)
- Created by: Stan Lee (writer); Jack Kirby (artist)

In-story information
- Alter ego: Anthony Ludgate Druid
- Species: Human
- Team affiliations: Monster Hunters; Avengers; Legion of the Unliving; Defenders
- Notable aliases: Druid
- Abilities: Limited telepathy Limited telekinesis Hypnosis; Magic detection Mystic manipulation Scholar of magic

Doctor Anthony Druid, also known as Doctor Droom and Druid, is a fictional mystic and a supernatural monster-hunter appearing in American comic books published by Marvel Comics. Co-created by writer-editor Stan Lee and penciller Jack Kirby, he debuted as Dr. Anthony Droom in Amazing Adventures #1, published in March 1961 (with a cover date of June 1961). Kirby's art was inked by artist Steve Ditko. Dr. Droom appeared in four more issues of Amazing Adventures before his stories discontinued. Over a year later, artist Steve Ditko approached Stan Lee with a new magic character called Mr. Strange. Liking the idea, Stan Lee renamed the character Doctor Strange and wrote an origin story similar to Droom's. Dr. Anthony Droom was finally reintroduced to comics in 1976 in Weird Wonder Tales #19 in a retelling of his origin story which renamed him Dr. Anthony Druid. This retelling included new writing by Larry Lieber, Stan Lee's brother.

Through his knowledge, Doctor Druid has enhanced physical and mental abilities (such as hypnosis and the ability to sense magic) and knows how to counteract magic and protect against it (through rituals and special arrangement of symbols). According to the lore of Marvel Comics, this makes Druid a mystic but not a full sorcerer like Doctor Strange since he does not cast spells that alter the state of people or the environment around him and does not draw power from Earth's magical energy, extra-dimensional energy, or energy linked to magical entities.

Considered a scholar of multiple fields, Anthony Druid is originally a psychiatrist who then becomes an author and physician. After Druid undergoes a series of tests in Tibet, a dying lama and mystic mentally transmits to his mind secrets of how to enhance his own body and mind's power and control, as well as knowledge regarding magic and supernatural threats. Later, it is said Druid also taps into the knowledge of Celtic ancestors regarding magic. With the combined knowledge of both his Celtic ancestors and the Tibetan lama, Druid acts as a magic-based consultant and hero of Earth. Over the years, he has worked with the superhero team known as the Avengers, and it is later said he was part of a group known as the Monster Hunters.

== Publication history ==
"Dr. Droom" banner, Amazing Adventures #1 (June 1961), art by Jack Kirby & Steve Ditko.

Originally introduced as Dr. Anthony Droom, the character debuted in Amazing Adventures #1 (June 1961), written by Stan Lee, penciled by Jack Kirby, and inked by Steve Ditko. In the story, Anthony Droom is referred to as a psychiatrist, scholar, and physician and is independently wealthy. After undergoing a series of tests in Tibet, he is chosen by a dying lama to protect humanity from threats. In this version of the character's origin, he is imparted with all of the lama's knowledge and then is also transformed by magic from his Caucasian appearance to now having the appearance of East Asian heritage. He is told that his appearance suits his new knowledge and role. In the subsequent stories of Amazing Adventures, Droom continues to have an Asian appearance and is given a yellow skin tone.

After his origin in issue #1, Dr. Droom starred in stories in Amazing Adventures #2–4 and #6 (1961). Dr. Droom did not appear in the series again afterward, which was retitled as Amazing Adult Fantasy starting with issue #7 (the same series that with its final issue, Amazing Fantasy #15, would introduced Stan Lee and Steve Ditko's creation Spider-Man).

According to Lee, the idea of Doctor Droom was essentially succeeded by Doctor Strange: "... I always liked [Doctor Droom], but I forgot about him. It was a one-shot thing. And one day while we were trying to think of some new heroes, I thought I'd like to bring back a magician". Lee later clarified that the inciting incident to bring forth a magical character similar to Dr. Droom came when Steve Ditko brought him artwork for a character he called Mr. Strange. Stan Lee changed the name to Doctor Strange and gave the character a new version of Dr. Droom's origin, making Stephen Strange a physician who loses the use of his hands and then seeks out help from a sorcerer in the Himalayas for help, only to then become the man's student and return to New York as a sorcerer himself.

In 1976, Marvel editor Roger Stern thought to bring Doctor Droom back for issue #19 of Weird Wonder Tales, a series that reprinted previously published Marvel Comics stories, sometimes with new art. Issue #19 reprinted Dr. Droom's origin story but with some altered and added dialogue by Larry Lieber and with the protagonist now called Doctor Anthony Druid, new name conceived by Len Wein, presumably to avoid confusion with Marvel supervillain Doctor Doom. Druid sported a red outfit in his role as hero and the new version of his origin story removed the idea that the appearance of his racial heritage is altered by magic. Droom's second story was then reprinted in Weird Wonder Tales #20, again with new art work and with his name changed to Doctor Druid. The character then appeared in issues #21-22, but only as a host introducing fantasy stories to the reader. Weird Wonder Tales then ended with issue #23, which contained a reprint of another Droom story from Amazing Adventures. The story was introduced by a new splash page drawn by artist John Byrne. In the story, Droom's drab grey clothing was painted over with Druid's new red uniform.

Druid appeared next in The Incredible Hulk (vol. 2) #210-211 by writer Len Wein, and Ghost Rider (vol. 2) #26 by writer Jim Shooter. During Roger Stern's time as writer of Avengers in the 1980s, Druid was for a time a member of the team.

Druid appeared in the miniseries Druid #1–4 (May–Aug. 1995) by writer Warren Ellis and artist Leonardo Manco. In Marvel Universe #4–7 (Sept.–Dec. 1998), his backstory was expanded and retconned, now revealing he had been a member of the Monster Hunters, whose adventures took place between the "Age of Monsters" and the "Age of Heroes" (the latter era beginning when the Fantastic Four gain their powers and are soon followed by a wave of new public superheroes). Druid appeared as a Monster Hunter again in issue #2 of Marvel: The Lost Generation.

Doctor Druid was one of the featured characters in the 2011 three-issue limited series Chaos War: Dead Avengers.

=== Amazing Fantasy Omnibus ===
Dr. Druid's original five adventures as Dr. Droom were reprinted in Amazing Fantasy Omnibus (2007).

- #1 (June 1961)—"I Am the Fantastic Dr. Droom"

Reprinted in Weird Wonder Tales #19 (Dec. 1976)

- #2 (July 1961)—"The World Below"

Reprinted in Weird Wonder Tales #22 (May 1977)

- #3 (Aug. 1961)—"Dr. Droom Meets Zemu"

Reprinted in Weird Wonder Tales #20 (Jan. 1977)

- #4 (Sept. 1961)—"What Lurks Within?"

Never reprinted outside Amazing Fantasy Omnibus

- #6 (Nov. 1961)—"Dr. Droom Defies the Menace Called...Krogg"

Reprinted in Giant-Size Man-Thing #3 (Feb. 1975)

== Fictional character biography ==
Weird Wonder Tales #19 (Dec. 1976), an edited reprint of "I Am the Fantastic Dr. Droom" from Amazing Adventures #1 (June 1961); art by Jack Kirby and Steve Ditko.

Doctor Druid's real name is Dr. Anthony Ludgate Druid, although he usually refers to himself as Dr. Anthony Druid. He is a psychiatrist and explorer as well as a minor telepath and magician, specializing mostly in hypnosis and other feats of mesmerism. He has minor magical abilities that have varied over the years. He is also an expert on the occult, having been trained by a Tibetan lama who had come to the United States for medical attention. Many years later, Druid discovered that the lama was the Ancient One, who selected him as a back-up for Doctor Strange.

Doctor Druid remains on the sidelines for years. He eventually appears again and teams with the Hulk against the Maha Yogi. With the Avengers, he encounters the Fomor and his ancestor Amergin.

Sometime later, Druid aids the Avengers in thwarting Baron Helmut Zemo and the fourth Masters of Evil's takeover of Avengers Mansion, making contact with the mentally damaged Blackout and helping him resist Zemo's control while also prompting him to bring Avengers Mansion back to Earth after banishing it into the Darkforce. He joins the ranks of the Avengers shortly after helping to defend from this attack. He also battles a Dracula doppelganger in the realm of Death.

His membership is tainted when he is mind-controlled by supervillainess Terminatrix (at the time impersonating the space pirate Nebula) into manipulating the team on her behalf. While in this state, he assumes chairmanship of the team for a short period. When "Nebula" is cast into Limbo, Druid follows, still under her thrall. He eventually regains control of his own mind and returned to Earth, where, after learning his true origin, he banishes "Nebula" and uses magic to make himself younger.

Due to his actions while under the villain's spell, Druid is now disgraced. He is briefly reunited with his former teammates while working with Doctor Strange during the Infinity War, and later becomes the leader of the Secret Defenders. In that role, he is once again victimized by a villain's mind control, this time by the demon Slorioth. Druid and the demon are defeated, Druid fakes his own death, and the team disbands.

He then abandons his spandex costume and becomes more of a traditional druid, now reflected by his new use of the simple moniker "Druid", and the new nature of his elemental powers. He soon lets his feelings of rage and power lust take over, goes insane, is betrayed by his allies, and is finally killed by Daimon Hellstrom. Druid is later resurrected in the Chaos War storyline (2010).

As part of the All-New, All-Different Marvel, Druid resurfaces on Weirdworld. Nighthawk of Earth-31916, Blur of Earth-148611, and Tyndall were captured by Druid's minions and taken to his castle. He reveals to his captives that his soul took on a corporeal form when it found Weirdworld, where he remained in order to preserve his life. He also reveals that Ogeode built a massive crystal on top of Druid's castle to amplify Druid's mind-control abilities; this brought anyone in his part of Weirdworld under his thrall. For some reason, Thundra and Tyndall are immune to his effects.

Doctor Druid accompanies A.I.M. and Roxxon Energy Corporation, which are planning a merger with Stark Unlimited. On Monica Rappaccini's orders, Druid subjects Iron Man to illusions of Howard Stark, Captain America, and Emma Frost calling him a failure. Druid accompanies Rappaccini to the meeting with Stark Unlimited, where only Iron Man and Melinda May oppose the merger. It is revealed that Druid is enthralled by Belasco, who wants to claim the souls of the board members. The board members withdraw their votes, and Belasco's plans to control the companies falls through.

== Powers and abilities ==
Doctor Druid's latent mystical abilities were activated by the Ancient One. He has a variety of psionic abilities including telepathy, psychokinesis, mass hypnosis and illusionary effects, including invisibility, altering the appearance of himself and others, and the projection of illusionary objects or beings. Druid also has limited precognitive abilities and can sense the presence of recent uses of magic and trace them to their sources.

Doctor Druid employs the mystical knowledge and skills of the ancient druids. Through magic rituals and preparations, Doctor Druid can achieve various magical feats. These rituals tap the inherent mystical energies in natural objects and materials. His druidic powers have a vulnerability to iron.

Druid also possesses various yogic abilities, including control over involuntary functions of his body such as his heartbeat, respiration, bleeding, and reaction to pain.

Doctor Druid has demonstrated access to various Celtic mystical artifacts and summons as well, such as the time-manipulating Moebius Stone, and Celtic war goddesses Morrigan, Macha, and Badb.

Druid has earned an M.D. from Harvard, completed a residency in psychiatry, and has extensive knowledge of occult lore, especially Celtic lore.

== Other versions ==
=== Marvel Zombies ===
An alternate universe version of Doctor Druid appears in the 2007 miniseries Marvel Zombies vs. The Army of Darkness. Infected with the zombie virus, he visits Doctor Strange seeking help to stop from turning. With Strange having left to join the resistance, a ravenous Druid reluctantly consumes Strange's assistant, Wong. Despite pleading for mercy and understanding from Ash Williams, he blows his head off with his shotgun.

== Reception ==
Doctor Druid is often ranked amongst the worst Avengers members, and often considered a "B-list" hero. The original origin story for the character has also been cited as problematic due to the race-swapping aspect. However, he is noted for his magical abilities.

The limited series Druid was found to be a "total yawner" by The Slings and Arrows Comic Guide, but was praised for its horror elements.
