= Killer Shrike =

Name of Fictional character(s) in Marvel Comics

Publication information
- Publisher: Marvel Comics
- First appearance: Simon Maddicks: The Rampaging Hulk #1 (January 1977); Unknown man: The Superior Spider-Man #26 (March 2014)
- Created by: Simon Maddicks: John Warner; John Buscema; Unknown man: Dan Scott; Humberto Ramos; Javier Rodríguez; Marcos Martín

In-story information
- Alter ego: Simon Maddicks
- Species: Human
- Team affiliations: Brand Corporation; Masters of Evil; Roxxon Oil Company; Sinister Six; Thunderbolts; United States Air Force; United States Army
- Notable aliases: Harold Simmons
- Abilities: Expert hand to hand combatant and martial artist Possesses various weapons Anti-gravity device grants: Enhanced physical attributes Flight; Armored suit grants: Resistance to injury Electrical bolt projection via twin power-blasters

Killer Shrike is the name of two fictional characters appearing in American comic books published by Marvel Comics.

== Publication history ==
The Simon Maddicks incarnation of Killer Shrike first appeared in The Rampaging Hulk #1 (January 1977) and was created by John Warner and John Buscema.

== Fictional character biography ==
=== Simon Maddicks ===
Simon Maddicks was born in Williamsburg, Virginia. He began his career as a soldier in the United States Army. After that, he recalls little of his own past for unknown reasons. After being selected to be a special agent of the Roxxon Oil Company, Maddicks becomes a mercenary and professional criminal. Maddicks is given powered armor and an anti-gravity generator implanted in his spine.

For his first mission, Roxxon sends Killer Shrike to infiltrate the subversive organization called the Conspiracy, which Roxxon learned about through major purchases of technology from the Brand Corporation. The Conspiracy send Killer Shrike to capture a monster known as Goram. The plan is thwarted by Ulysses Bloodstone, who short-circuits Killer Shrike's weapons and badly injures him. Feeling sorry for Killer Shrike's condition, Bloodstone's agents send him to a New York hospital, where he remains comatose for several weeks.

After recovering, Maddicks is contacted by a group of Brand scientists led by Stephen Weems. Weems, better known as the villain Modular Man, seeks revenge against his enemies Spider-Man and Beast. In return, Modular Man promises Shrike information about his past. In battle with Spider-Man and Beast, Weems is killed before he can uphold his bargain. Shrike escapes and is found by Brand agents, who restore his memory and assign him to undercover work as a bodyguard to Brand president James Melvin. Following the dissolution of the Brand Corporation, Killer Shrike becomes a free agent.

Killer Shrike is apprehended by Helmut Zemo and forced to join the Thunderbolts, for unclear reasons.

Killer Shrike appears as a member of the Shadow Council's Masters of Evil. Killer Shrike is present when Max Fury and the Masters of Evil capture John Steele after he attempts to escape Bagalia with the Serpent Crown and the Crown of Thorns.

Killer Shrike is among the villains who join Swarm's Sinister Six when they attack Spider-Man and the students of the Jean Grey School for Higher Learning. After Swarm is defeated by Hellion, Killer Shrike and the other villains surrender.

=== Unnamed criminal ===
Killer Shrike sells his original costume to Roderick Kingsley, who in turn gives it to an unnamed criminal. Killer Shrike is present with Hobgoblin (Kingsley's butler Claude) during his battle with the Goblin Nation. After the Goblin King kills Hobgoblin, Killer Shrike defects to the Goblin Nation.

== Powers and abilities ==
Extensive conditioning and surgery by Brand Corporation scientists enhanced Simon Maddicks's strength and other physical abilities. He is capable of flight by means of a surgically implanted anti-gravity generator at the base of his spine, activated by a neural link.

Besides that, he has extensive training and experience in hand-to-hand combat and martial arts, and proficiency with hand weapons including guns and knives.

Killer Shrike wears an armored suit made of an insulated steel alloy that protects him from turbulence and small caliber weapons fire. His major weapons system is the twin power-blasters worn on his wrists, which possess powerful titanium claws and can generate electricity.

== Other versions ==
An alternate universe version of Simon Maddicks / Killer Shrike from Earth-1610 makes a cameo appearance in Ultimate Spider-Man #72.

== In other media ==
The Simon Maddicks incarnation of Killer Shrike appears in Iron Man: Armored Adventures, voiced by Ty Olsson. This version is an enforcer for the Maggia in the first season and Justin Hammer / Titanium Man in the second season. Additionally, his anti-gravity generator is incorporated into his wrist blasters.
