= Nikki (comics) =

Marvel Comics character

- Textless cover of Guardians 3000 #5; Art by Alex Ross.

Publication information
- Publisher: Marvel Comics
- First appearance: Marvel Presents #4 (April 1976)
- Created by: Steve Gerber; Mary Skrenes; Al Milgrom

In-story information
- Alter ego: Nicholette Gold
- Species: Mercurian
- Team affiliations: Guardians of the Galaxy; Avengers
- Abilities: Mercurian physiology granting: Superhuman strength, speed, vision, agility, durability, and reflexes; Heat resistance; Pyrokinesis

Nicholette "Nikki" Gold is a character appearing in American comic books published by Marvel Comics. Created by Steve Gerber, Mary Skrenes, and Al Milgrom, the character first appeared in Marvel Presents #4 (April 1976). Nicholette Gold has been a member of the Guardians of the Galaxy at various points in her history.

== Development ==
=== Concept and creation ===
Mercurians first appeared in The Defenders vol. 1 #26 (August 1975). Nicholette Gold was first referred to in FOOM #12 (1975). Writer Steve Gerber later stated, "I wanted to [add] a girl – a Mercurian – because there wasn't one in the group. The conception was, I think, half mine and half Mary Skrenes'." At the time Gerber stopped writing Marvel Presents, Nikki Gold still had no clearly defined powers, leaving his successor Roger Stern to fill in that aspect of the character. Stern reflected, "Nikki was the blankest slate. I saw her 'power' as being able to adapt to virtually any environment. Otherwise, how would someone who had been born on the planet Mercury been able to stand - much less turn somersaults - under standard Earth gravity?" (Note: Earth's gravity is more than twice that of Mercury's.)

=== Publication history ===
Nicholette Gold debuted in Marvel Presents #4 (April 1976), and was created by Steve Gerber, Mary Skrenes, and Al Milgrom. She appeared in the 2014 Guardians 3000 series.

== Fictional character biography ==
Nicholette "Nikki" Gold was born on the planet Mercury in the 31st century. She was rescued from an abandoned spacecraft by the Guardians of the Galaxy. She joined the Guardians, seeking excitement and adventure after years of solitude aboard the abandoned spacecraft. She later joined with Vance Astro in a metaphysical union in a successful attempt to use the force of human love to destroy the Topographical Man. The sexual nature of this union embarrassed Vance, but not Nikki.

Nikki traveled to the present with the other Guardians, and assisted the Avengers in battle against Korvac. She traveled to the present again, and battled Hammer and Anvil alongside Spider-Man.

Alongside the Guardians, Nikki later went on a quest to find the lost shield of Captain America, and battled Taserface. She battled the Stark alongside the other Guardians. She encountered Firelord. She battled the super-humanoid team known as Force alongside the Guardians.

During her time on the team, Nikki had a romantic relationship with Charlie-27, though they later amicably separated. She became attracted to later Guardian recruits Firelord and Talon though both simply wished to remain friends.

== Powers and abilities ==
Nikki is a member of an offshoot of humanity who were genetically engineered to survive in the harsh conditions of the planet Mercury. She possesses superhuman attributes, such as superhuman strength, speed, vision, agility, durability, and reflexes. She can see in intense light. She has a high degree of resistance to heat and most types of radiation. Nikki has demonstrated an ability to increase the intensity of the flames radiating from her scalp, to the point of being able to briefly project the flames outward as an offensive tactic. She has been shown using this ability to burn the hair from Charlie-27's scalp and eyebrows, scorch opponents such as the evil mutant Blockade, and lay down a wall of flame to repel attackers. Another side effect of Mercurian physiology is a natural body temperature of several hundred degrees; at one point, Nikki took up swimming to temporarily reduce her body temperature for Charlie-27's safety while they were in a romantic relationship. Additionally, Nikki has achieved extensive proficiency in hand-to-hand combat and proficiency in gymnastics and sharp-shooting. She is often armed with a neuronic frequency stun gun, a laser pistol, and various handgun-type weapons as needed.

== Reception ==
=== Critical response ===
Deirdre Kaye of Scary Mommy called Nicholette Gold a "role model" and a "truly heroic" female character. Bradley Prom of Screen Rant included Nicholette Gold in their "10 Best Members Of The Guardians Of The Galaxy Still Missing From The MCU" list. Evan Lewis of MovieWeb ranked Nicholette Gold 10th in their "10 Female Characters the MCU Should Introduce in Future Phases" list.

== In other media ==
- Nicholette "Nikki" Gold appears as a playable character in Lego Marvel Super Heroes 2 as part of the "Classic Guardians of the Galaxy" DLC.
- Nicholette "Nikki" Gold appears in Marvel's Guardians of the Galaxy, voiced by Romane Denis. This version is the adopted daughter of Kree Nova Corps member Ko-Rel who later gains powers from exposure to the Soul Stone.
