= Monster Hunters =

Fictional comic book group

The Monster Hunters
- The Monster Hunters (clockwise from top: Doctor Druid, Zawadi, and Ulysses Bloodstone) make their first appearance (surrounded by Atlas-era monsters). From Marvel Universe #4.

Publication information
- Publisher: Marvel Comics
- First appearance: Marvel Universe #4 (September 1998)
- Created by: Roger Stern; Mike Manley

In-story information
- Base(s): The Explorer's Club, New York City
- Member(s): Ulysses Bloodstone; Doctor Druid; Makkari; Namora; Zawadi

The Monster Hunters are a fictional group appearing in American comic books published by Marvel Comics. This group exists in Marvel's shared universe, known as the Marvel Universe.

The team was created as a retcon to explain some events in the history of the Marvel Universe that were no longer plausible due to previous retcons. Their adventures are set during the late 1940s and 50's, a time when (in real life) Marvel/Atlas was mostly printing stories about strange monsters and alien invaders.

== Publication history ==
The Monster Hunters first appeared in Marvel Universe #4 (September 1998) and consisted of Ulysses Bloodstone, Makkari the Eternal (who organized the group using the alias Hurricane), the psychic and mystic known as Doctor Druid, and Zawadi, a skilled huntress and warrior from Wakanda.

They were later joined by Namora, cousin of the Sub-Mariner, in Marvel: The Lost Generation #2 (January 2001).

== Fictional team history ==
When countless monsters began appearing around the world, suspicion turned to curiosity. Makkari, under the identities of Jake Curtiss and Mac Curry, encountered a monster of his own and then gathered Dr. Anthony Ludgate Druid and Ulysses Bloodstone when they too did the same. Bloodstone, while investigating where the alien Grottu had come from, was saved by Zawadi and decided to bring her along also.

Their first meeting was at the Explorer's Club in New York City owned by Stanley Hathaway. This club would become the public front for the team. They identified themselves, and Druid revealed the origin of his powers. The group exchanged stories of their monster battles, and developed suspicions of one another, which they kept secret for the time being. Their meeting was cut short by a mysterious man waking a sleeping Gorgilla (a giant ape-like monster) on a boat in New York harbor.

The battle with Gorgilla takes place in many areas of New York and finally ends at the Statue of Liberty with Dr. Druid calming the creature with telepathy. It is revealed during this time that Adam Clayton is the "real" name of Jake Curtiss, and that a "mystery man" was controlling Gorgilla. This was done to have Gorgilla divert a police escort of an African Premier to a bridge where a bomb was underneath, thus assassinating him.

The Monster Hunters agree that Gorgilla should be taken back to the wild where he originated. While doing this, the team is attacked in their plane via an alien-looking craft. They are saved, though, with quick thinking from Clayton, who is now revealed to be the superhero Hurricane, sometimes called Mercury. When they arrive at Midnight Mountain in Borneo, they are again attacked by the Lizard Men, who succeed in capturing Hurricane.

During the battle, Bloodstone's secrets and origin are revealed. The three remaining members of the team then go on a rescue mission to free Hurricane from the mystery villain that has caused all this. Battling monster after monster on an island in the Sea of Japan, the team finally rescues the now revealed Makkari from his nemesis, Kro of the Deviants, who had created most or all the monsters that they have encountered. After a fierce battle, the team causes Kro to retreat and they all escape the island heading toward Tokyo, their adventures only beginning.

Harvey Elder (the future Mole Man) is also present in the storyline. It is because of his defiant nature and constantly being in a thorn in the side of the Monster Hunters that he is left behind at "Monster Island".

In 1958, the Monster Hunters are joined by Namora. When Dr. Druid picked up strange psychic emissions coming from a warehouse it led the team into a direct conflict with heroes from the First Line. After the misunderstanding, the two teams battle a Skrull-created monster.

After this, not much is known about the further adventures of the Monster Hunters, who started drifting apart over time and eventually disbanded. Since then Bloodstone and Druid have died, while Zawadi disappeared. Until recently, Makkari was the only member of the original team that was still active. This changed, though, when the Agents of Atlas found a coffin at the ocean's bottom containing a very alive Namora. She has since joined that team.
