= Namora =

Superhero in Marvel Universe

- Namora on the cover of Sub-Mariner Comics #27 (August 1948 Timely Comics). Art by Bill Everett.

Publication information
- Publisher: Marvel Comics
- First appearance: Marvel Mystery Comics #82 (May 1947)
- Created by: Unconfirmed writer Ken Bald (penciller); Bob Powell (cover artist)

In-story information
- Alter ego: Aquaria Nautica Neptunia
- Species: Atlantean–human mutant hybrid
- Place of origin: Atlantis
- Team affiliations: Monster Hunters; Agents of Atlas; Renegades "Avengers" (1959)
- Partnerships: Namorita; Namor; Fin
- Notable aliases: Avenging Daughter; Sub-Mariner; Sea Queen
- Abilities: Superhuman strength, speed, agility, stamina, durability, and reflexes; Flight via wings on her ankles; Aquatic adaptation; Longevity

Namora (/neɪˈmɔːrə/; Aquaria Nautica Neptunia) is a character appearing in American comic books published by Marvel Comics. Created by artists Ken Bald and Syd Shores, the character first appeared in Marvel Mystery Comics #82 (May 1947). Namora is from Atlantis and is the daughter of an Atlantean father and a human mother and is the cousin of Namor.

Namora appears in the Marvel Cinematic Universe film Black Panther: Wakanda Forever (2022), portrayed by Mabel Cadena.

== Publication history ==
Cover art for Marvel Mystery Comics #82.

Namora debuted in the 12-page comic story "The Coming of Namora!" published in Marvel Mystery Comics #82 (May 1947), pencilled by Ken Bald and inked by Syd Shores. Namora also featured on the cover drawn by Bob Powell. Her costume was designed by Sub-Mariner creator Bill Everett. Initially, she and Namor had no apparent familial relationship, and romantic interest was sometimes implied between the two.

She had her own comic book series, Namora, which ran from August–December 1948. While this title lasted three issues, she regularly appeared with Namor in Marvel Mystery Comics and also in Sub-Mariner until that series ended in 1955.

The character was not seen again for 16 years until she made a brief flashback appearance in the Silver Age Sub-Mariner series, in Sub-Mariner #33 (January 1971). Her death was established in Sub-Mariner #50 (June 1972), where her corpse is shown to Namor, and depicted in flashback in #51 (July 1972).

Over the next 30 years, Namora appeared in a number of flashbacks and alternate reality stories, including What If? #9 (June 1978), The New Warriors Annual #1 (1991), What If? #47 (March 1993), The New Warriors #44 (February 1994), Avengers: Forever #4-5 (March–April 1999), and Marvel: The Lost Generation #3-2 (December 2000-January 2001).

Namora eventually reappears, alive, in the Agents of Atlas series, in issues #1-6 (October 2006-March 2007). She also appears in The Incredible Hulk #107-112 (August–December 2007), Giant-Size Marvel Adventures: Avengers #1 (September 2007), World War Hulk #2 (September 2007), Spider-Man Family #4 (October 2007), and The Incredible Hercules #121-122 (November–December 2008).

Namora received an entry in Official Handbook of the Marvel Universe: Golden Age 2004.

== Fictional character biography ==
Namora is a character that originated in the Golden Age of Comic Books. Her original name was Aquaria Nautica Neptunia, but she was nicknamed "Namora" in honor of Namor. Like Namor, she is a hybrid mutant who possesses superhuman strength and is able to fly via the wings on her ankles. When her father was killed by treasure-hunting surface-dwellers, she fully changed her name to Namora, the Atlantean term for "Avenging Daughter", as Namor means "Avenging Son". Namora is Namor's cousin (though not by blood), and became his companion for several years.

Namora dies after being poisoned by Llyra. She is survived by her clone Namorita, whom she had passed off as her daughter because of Atlantian taboos against cloning. The series Marvel: The Lost Generation revealed that she was a member of the Monster Hunters in 1956.

=== Agents of Atlas ===
Cover art for Agents of Atlas #4. Art by Tomm Coker.

Some time later, the Agents of Atlas find a damaged coffin, which appears to contain the mummified corpse of Namora. Upon closer inspection, Marvel Boy disables a holographic display creating the corpse image, revealing Namora to have been preserved inside the coffin. After being awakened, Namora joins the Agents of Atlas.

=== Dark Reign ===
The Agents of Atlas oppose Norman Osborn's agenda by taking on the role of "supervillains", in order to form close ties to Osborn. After some time, the group becomes aware of Osborn's Cabal, only to learn that Namor is a member of the Cabal. Upon finding this out, the Agents confront Namor for his involvement in the group. Initially at odds with each other for their recent decisions, Namora and Namor end up entering a relationship. However, they separate after learning that their relationship had been engineered by the elders of Atlantis.

=== Infinity ===
During Infinity, Namora's Atlantean School is chosen as one of the institutions set to do battle in the new Contest of Champions. However, Atlantis is attacked and decimated by the forces of Thanos before the competition can begin.

== Powers and abilities ==
Namora possesses superhuman strength, speed, agility, stamina, durability, and reflexes. She is nearly invulnerable as bullets and other missiles cannot penetrate her extremely tough skin. She can swim at superhuman speeds, breathe underwater, and is immune to the cold and pressures of the depths. She can also see better underwater than a normal human.

== Reception ==
=== Critical response ===
Deirdre Kaye of Scary Mommy called Namora a "role model" and a "truly heroic" female character. Charles Nichola Raymond of Screen Rant called Namora a "capable hero in her own right," while Philip Etemesi ranked her 2nd in their "Marvel's 10 Most Powerful Aquatic Characters" list. Megan Nicole O'Brien of Comic Book Resources ranked Namora 2nd in their "Marvel: 10 Best Golden Age Heroines" list. Comics Buyer's Guide ranked Namora 76th in their "100 Sexiest Women in Comics" list.

==== Marvel Cinematic Universe ====
Nicole Drum of ComicBook.com called Namora a "fan favorite."

== Other versions ==
=== Exiles ===
An alternate universe version of Namora appears in Exiles. This version is a blue-skinned gender-swapped counterpart of Namor. Decades prior, Namora allies with Charles Xavier, who convinced her to not attack the surface world. She would later do so after anti-mutant hysteria led to the imprisonment of most mutants, killing most of Earth's heroes and taking over the world before she is eventually forced to join the Exiles. After learning her teammate Morph was seemingly killed by Hyperion, she attempts to kill Hyperion, only to be killed by him.

=== Marvel Mangaverse ===
An alternate universe version of Namora appears in the Marvel Mangaverse story "Eternity Twilight".

=== Marvel Her-oes ===
An alternate universe version of Namora appears in Marvel Her-oes, written by Grace Randolph. This version is a teenager and classmate of Jennifer Walters and Janet van Dyne who hides her Atlantean heritage by posing as a Greek exchange student named "Namora Aquarius".

=== Ultimate Marvel ===
An alternate universe version of Namora makes a minor appearance in Ultimatum.

== In other media ==
- Namora appears in Black Panther: Wakanda Forever, portrayed by Mabel Cadena. This version is a Talokanil warrior and trusted advisor to Namor.
- Namora appears as a playable character in Marvel Puzzle Quest.
- In 2022, Funko released a Funko Pop! figure of Namora inspired by the Black Panther: Wakanda Forever incarnation of the character.
