= The Food of the Gods and How It Came to Earth =

1904 science fiction novel by H. G. Wells

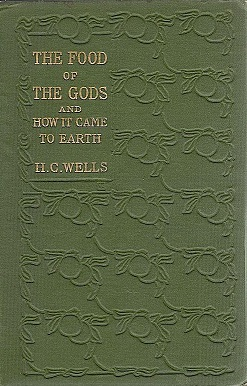
- First edition (UK)
- Author: H. G. Wells
- Language: English
- Genre: Science fiction, Romance novel
- Published: 1904 (Macmillan)
- Publication place: United Kingdom
- Media type: Print (Hardcover and Paperback)
- Pages: 317
- Text: The Food of the Gods and How It Came to Earth at Wikisource

The Food of the Gods and How It Came to Earth is a science fiction novel by H. G. Wells that was first published in 1904. Wells called it "a fantasia on the change of scale in human affairs. ... I had hit upon [the idea] while working out the possibilities of the near future in a book of speculations called Anticipations (1901)".

The novel, which has had various B-movie adaptations, is about a group of scientists who invent food that accelerates the growth of children, turning them into giants when they become adults.

== Plot summary ==
=== Books I and II: The Discovery of the Food ===
Research chemist Mr. Bensington specialises in "the More Toxic Alkaloids", and Professor Redwood studies reaction times and takes an interest in "Growth". Redwood's suggestion "that the process of growth probably demanded the presence of a considerable quantity of some necessary substance in the blood that was only formed very slowly" causes Bensington to begin searching for such a substance.

After a year of research and experiment, he finds a way to make what he calls in his initial enthusiasm "the Food of the Gods" but later more soberly dubs Herakleophorbia IV. Their first experimental success is with chickens that grow to about six times their normal size on an experimental farm at Hickleybrow, near Urshot, Kent. (Note: Where H. G. Wells was born and grew up.)

Mr. and Mrs. Skinner, the couple hired to feed and monitor the chickens, eventually allow Herakleophorbia IV to enter the local food chain, and the other creatures that get the food grow to six or seven times their normal size: not only plants, but also wasps, earwigs, and rats. The chickens escape and overrun a nearby town. Bensington and Redwood do nothing until a decisive and efficient "well-known civil engineer" of their acquaintance, Cossar, arrives to organize a party of eight to destroy the wasps' nest, hunt down the monstrous vermin and burn the experimental farm to the ground.

As debate ensues about the substance, popularly known as "Boomfood", children are being given the substance and grow to enormous size: Redwood's son ("pioneer of the new race"), Cossar's three sons, and Mrs. Skinner's grandson, Caddles. Dr. Winkles makes the substance available to a princess, and there are other giants as well. The massive offspring reach about 40 feet in height. At first, the giants are tolerated, but as they grow further, restrictions are imposed.

In time, most of the English population comes to resent the young giants, as well as changes to flora, fauna and the organisation of society that become more extensive with each passing year. Bensington is nearly lynched by an angry mob and subsequently retires from active life to Mount Glory Hydrotherapeutic Hotel. Mrs. Skinner's grandson, Albert Edward Caddles, becomes an epitome of "the coming of Bigness in the world". (Note: Wells takes the occasion to satirise the conservative rural gentry (Lady Wondershoot) and the Church of England clergy (the Vicar of Cheasing Eyebright) in describing life in a backward little village.)

=== Book III: The Harvest of the Food ===
A man, recently released from prison after having been incarcerated for 20 years is shocked by how much everything has changed. British society has learned to cope with occasional outbreaks of giant pests (mosquitoes, spiders etc.), but the coming to maturity of the giant children brings a rabble-rousing politician, Caterham, nicknamed "Jack the Giant Killer", into power. Caterham has been promoting a program to destroy the Food of the Gods, hints that he will suppress the giants and now begins to execute his plan.

By coincidence, it is at that moment that Caddles rebels against spending his life working in a chalk pit and sets out to see the world. In London, he is surrounded by thousands of tiny people and confused by everything that he sees. He demands to know what it is all for and where he fits in, but no one can answer his questions. After refusing to return to his chalk pit, Caddles is shot and killed by the police.

Meanwhile, a romance between the young giant Redwood and the princess blossoms just as Caterham, who has at last attained a position of power, launches an effort to suppress the giants. However, after two days of fighting, the giants, who have taken refuge in an enormous pit, have held their own. Their bombardment of London with shells containing large quantities of Herakleophorbia IV forces Caterham to call a truce. (Note: The British leader is satirized as a demagogue, a "vote-monster" for whom nothing but "gatherings, and caucuses, and votes – above all votes" are real.)

Caterham employs Redwood père as an envoy to send a proposed settlement, whose terms would demand that the giants live apart somewhere and forgo the right to reproduce. The offer is rejected at a meeting of the giants, and one of Cossar's sons expresses a belief in growth as part of the law of life: "We fight not for ourselves but for growth, growth that goes on for ever. Tomorrow, whether we live or die, growth will conquer through us. That is the law of the spirit for evermore. To grow according to the will of God!" The world ends up on the verge of a long struggle between the "little people" and the Children of the Food.

== Film, television and theatrical adaptations ==
Bert I. Gordon adapted the work to the movies twice. He first co-wrote, produced and directed Village of the Giants (1965) for Embassy Pictures. In this film, the substance, called simply "Goo", is developed by an 11-year-old (Ron Howard) and is consumed by a gang of teenaged troublemakers (led by Beau Bridges), who become giants and take over the town and turn the tables on the knee-high adults. They are eventually defeated by other teens (led by Tommy Kirk).

The Food of the Gods was released by American International Pictures in 1976 and was again written, produced, and directed by Gordon. Based on a portion of the book, it reduces the tale to an "ecology strikes back" scenario, then common in science fiction films. The movie was not very successful and received a Golden Turkey Award for Worst Rodent Movie of All Time, "beating" such competitors as The Killer Shrews (1959), The Mole People (1956), The Nasty Rabbit (1965) and Night of the Lepus (1972).

In 1989, Gnaw: Food of the Gods, Part 2 was released, written by Richard Bennett and directed by Damian Lee. Dealing with a pack of giant lab rats wreaking havoc on a college campus, it is even further removed from the book than Gordon's attempts.

== Comic book adaptions ==
The Food of the Gods was first adapted for the comics in January 1961 for Classics Illustrated #160 with a painted cover by Gerald McCann, script by Alfred Sundel and interior artwork by Tony Tallarico. The giant wasps are depicted in only two panels, and the giant rats do not appear at all.

A more dynamic and dramatic version, "told in the mighty Marvel manner", features in Marvel Classics Comics #22 (Marvel Comics 1977), written by Doug Moench with art by Sonny Trinidad.

"Deadly Muffins" in Secrets of Sinister House #13 (DC Comics 1973) is an uncredited version of the story written by John Albano and drawn by Alfredo Alcala.

== See also ==
- Dr. Ox's Experiment by Jules Verne
