= Irwin Shapiro (writer) =

American writer and translator

- Born: 1911; Pittsburgh
- Died: 1981 (aged 69–70)
- Occupation: writer
- Years active: 1938–1979
- Employer: Golden Books
- Spouse: Edna Richter

Irwin Shapiro (1911–1981) was an American writer and translator of over 40 books, mostly for children and about Americana.

== Biography ==
Irwin Shapiro was born in Pittsburgh, Pennsylvania. Little is known of his background or upbringing. His family probably came from what is now Hungary, since his first published books in the late 1930s are translations from Hungarian.

Shapiro studied at the Art Students League in New York City, where he is known to have taken at least one class under Thomas Hart Benton with fellow student Esther Shemitz (who later married Whittaker Chambers). During the Great Depression, he held odd jobs.

Shapiro married Edna Richter. She worked in the Works Progress Administration (WPA), in which she was also "an active member of the American Federation of Government Employees Union." According to Shapiro's son, husband and wife were "both deep in the Party." Edna Richter was Moscow correspondent for the Daily Worker newspaper. With events like the trials of the Great Purge and the Hitler-Stalin Pact, "my parents saw the truth, thanks to Stalin."

(Shapiro's brother-in-law, Irving Richter, worked with the United Auto Workers (UAW) and lived much of his life in Detroit. He appeared before the House Un-American Activities Committee (HUAC) in 1956, at which time Edna Richter's name and work at the WPA was mentioned.)

Shapiro and his wife moved to Florida, where he died in 1981.

== Works ==
After an initial foray into writing radical literature that encompassed his last year as a communist, Shapiro turned to children's books, which he published for the vast majority of his career (1938–1979). He published many titles for Golden Books. Among them is The Gremlins of Liet. Oggins, which author Andrew Meier suspects was really a coded message about the imprisonment of American spy Isaiah Oggins in the GULAG under Stalin." He also adapted a number of works of classic literature into comic book form (illustrated by artists) for Pendulum Press in 1973–1974. The Library of Congress holds 44 titles in his name.

=== Plays ===
- 90 Percent of the People (1938, unpublished) (archived at New York Public Library)

=== Translations ===
- Prelude to Love by Jolán Földes, translated from Hungarian by Alexander G. Kenedi and Irwin Shapiro (1938)
- Egyptian Interlude by Jolán Földes, translated from Hungarian by Irwin Shapiro (1939)

=== Books ===
- How Old Stormalong Captured Mocha Dick with pictures by Donald McKay (1942)
- Steamboat Bill and the Captain's Top Hat with pictures by Donald Mckay (1943)
- Gremlins of Lieut. Oggins with illustrations by Donald McKay (1943)
- Yankee thunder: The Legendary Life of Davy Crockett with pictures by James Daugherty (1944)
- Casey Jones and Locomotive No. 638 with pictures by Donald McKay (1944)
- John Henry and the Double Jointed Steam-Drill with drawings by James Daugherty (1945)
- Joe Magarac and His USA Citizen Papers with pictures by James Daugherty (1948) (LOC entry)
- J. Fred Muggs (1955)
- Walt Disney's Davy Crockett's Keelboat Race (1955)
- Walt Disney's Davy Crockett, King of the Wild Frontier (1955)
- Daniel Boone (1956)
- Presidents of the United States illustrated by Mel Crawford and Edwin Schmidt (1956)
- Cleo. Photos. by Durward B. Graybill (1957)
- Golden Tales from the Arabian Nights: The Most Famous Stories from the Great Classic A Thousand and One Nights (1957)*
- Golden book of America: Stories from Our Country's Past adapted for young readers by Irwin Shapiro from the pages of American Heritage, with a foreword by Bruce Catton (1957)
- Lassie Finds a Way: A New Story of the Famous Dog (1957)
- Circus Boy with pictures by Joan Walsh Anglund (1957)
- Tall Tales of America illustrated by Al Schmidt (1958)
- The Story of Flight: From the Ancient Winged Gods to the Age of Space by John Lewellen and Irwin Shapiro, illustrated with old prints, photos, and original paintings and drawings by Harry McNaught (1959)
- Aviation, des origines aux vols interplanétaires (1959) (translation)
- The Story of Yankee Whaling by the editors of American heritage with narrative by Irwin Shapiro in consultation with Edouard A. Stackpole (1960)
- The Golden Book of California: From the Days of the Spanish Explorers to the Present (1961)
- The Golden book of Aviation (1961) (second printing)
- Heroes in American Folklore illustrated by James Daugherty and Donald McKay (1962)
- Jonathan and the Dragon illustrated by Tom Vroman (1962)
- The Golden Book of the Renaissance adapted for young readers by Irwin Shapiro from theHorizon Book of the Renaissance (1962)
- The Universal History of the World edited by Irwin Shapiro (1966)
- Gretchen and the White Steed with drawings by Herman Vestal (1972)
- Sam Patch, Champion Jumper illustrated by Ted Schroeder (1972)
- Willie's Whizmobile with drawings by Paul Frame (1973)
- Twice upon a Time illustrated by Adrienne Adams (1973)
- Tom Sawyer (adaptation), illustrated by E. R. Cruz (Pendulum Press, 1973). Reprinted in Marvel Classics Comics #7 (1976)
- Moby-Dick (adaptation), illustrated by Alex Niño & Dan Adkins (Pendulum Press, 1973). Reprinted in Marvel Classics Comics #8 (1976)
- The Red Badge of Courage (adaptation), illustrated by E .R. Cruz (Pendulum Press, 1974). Reprinted in Marvel Classics Comics #10 (1976)
- Uncle Sam's 200th Birthday Parade illustrated by Frank Brugos (1974)
- Paul Bunyan Tricks a Dragon illustrated by Raymond Burns (1975)
- Dan McCann and His Fast Sooner Hound illustrated by Mimi Korach (1975)
- Smokey Bear's Camping Book illustrated by Mel Crawford (1976)
- Darwin and the Enchanted Isles illustrated by Christopher Spollen (1977)
- The Hungry Ghost Mystery illustrated by William M. Hutchinson (1978)
- Joe Magarac and His USA Citizen Papers (1979) (second printing)
- The Gift of Magic Sleep: Early Experiments in Anesthesia illustrated by Pat Rotondo (1979)
- Tenggren's Golden Tales from the Arabian Nights illustrated by Gustaf Tenggren, retold by Margaret Soifer and Irwin Shapiro, introduction by Mary Pope Osborne (2003)
