= Joe Magarac and His USA Citizen Papers =

1948 novel by Irwin Shapiro

- First edition
- Author: Irwin Shapiro (1911–1981)
- Cover artist: James Daugherty
- Language: English
- Publisher: Julian Messner, Inc.
- Publication date: 1948
- Publication place: United States
- Media type: Print (hardback)
- Pages: 58 pp
- OCLC: 1417159

Joe Magarac and His USA Citizen Papers is a novel for children by the American writer Irwin Shapiro and illustrated by James Daugherty set in the steel valley of Pittsburgh, Pennsylvania. It tells the story of the "legendary" steelworker Joe Magarac, who when a mill boss tells him that he needs $1,000 to get his American citizenship papers, goes on a working spree to earn the money. Magarac gets angry, however, when a U.S. Congressman tells him to go back to the Old Country where he came from. Magarac goes on a rampage through Washington, D.C., ripping up rails and knocking down buildings, and in a climatic rage scales the United States Capitol.

In 1947, the book received the Julia Ellsworth Ford Foundation Award.

== Reception ==
Ellen Lewis Buell of The New York Times called the book "robustious portrait of old Joe" that is "told in a ugsty workers' colloquialism and perfectly illustrated". In a positive review, The Gazette and Daily book critic, G. A. N. said the novel had "the proportions of a Paul Bunyan story and is about appealing". The reviewer thought that the illustrations were "slightly crowded on the pages" but were "as rustic as" the protagonist. The Daily Worker's Barnard Rubin lamented that the author did not include Joe Magarac's enthusiastic advoacy for fair pay and improved labor standards but praised the author for accurately capturing "the swing and flavor of the Slav steel worker's language" and the illustrator's "black-and-white drawings" for "expertly captur[ing] the humor and virality of the tale".
