= Glenn Greenberg =

American journalist and author

Glenn Greenberg is an American journalist and comic book and fiction writer. At the beginning of his career, he became a regular Marvel Comics writer, penning stories for The Spectacular Spider-Man, The Rampaging Hulk, The Silver Surfer, and Dracula. He has also written articles for comic-related magazines such as Back Issue!.

After establishing himself in the comic book industry, he was hired to write the Star Trek: Untold Voyages comic book limited series which depicted a second five-year mission for Captain Kirk's Enterprise and became a fan favorite. Since then, Greenberg has written several books in the Star Trek universe, a screenplay, and an X-Files story for a fiction anthology collection.

As a journalist, Greenberg has written for such publications as Entertainment Weekly, People, and Time for Kids, and written nonfiction special-edition magazines for Time Life Books, Time, and other publishers about topics including John Lennon, Paul McCartney, the Beatles, Star Trek, Star Wars, Marvel, Indiana Jones, Dracula, Superman, Batman, and Spider-Man.
