= Ulysses Bloodstone =

Fictional character in comic books by Marvel Comics

- Ulysses Bloodstone promotional artwork

Publication information
- Publisher: Marvel Comics
- First appearance: Marvel Presents #1: Dweller From the Depths! (October 1975), as Ulysses Bloodstone
- Created by: John Warner; Mike Vosburg; Len Wein; Pat Boyette

In-story information
- Species: Human (empowered)
- Team affiliations: Monster Hunters; Fury's Black Ops Initiative (1959)
- Notable aliases: Frank; Ahab; Captain Ahab; Red Stone Kid; Redstone Kid; Major Bloodstone
- Abilities: Immortality; regeneration; superhuman strength, speed, endurance, agility, durability, reflexes; heightened senses; invisible "third eye" on his forehead, granting psychic powers

Ulysses Bloodstone is a fictional character appearing in American comic books published by Marvel Comics. He is an immortal monster-hunter.

Ulysses Bloodstone appeared in the Marvel Cinematic Universe / Disney+ television special Werewolf by Night, voiced by Richard Dixon.

== Publication history ==
Ulysses Bloodstone first appeared in Marvel Presents #1 (Oct 1975) and was created by Len Wein, Marv Wolfman, and John Warner.

John Warner has explained the development of Ulysses Bloodstone: "Len Wein and Marv Wolfman came up with the spark that would become Bloodstone—the premise of a man who fights monsters—and together he [sic] and I began to develop a series idea to take up ten pages of Where Monsters Dwell." Mike Vosburg was the artist assigned to the first installment, and then Pat Boyette was to do the rest of the series. Warner developed ideas for the ongoing story, describing the planned ideas as "grand and epic and sweeping in scope" and "very cosmic and complex."

Where Monsters Dwell was cancelled at the same time as The Living Mummy, another title on which Warner was working. However, he was informed that he would get the chance to run part of the story in the first two issues of a new title, Marvel Presents. The first two parts were finished, and they would run in issue one; Warner had to draw everything to a satisfactory close in the second issue. He says, "In the first two episodes I had laid the groundwork for this grand sweeping epic ... and all of a sudden I had to tie it off in eighteen pages." This left a lot of the story untold, and he could only introduce two of the characters he wanted to bring in, Brad Carter and P.D.Q. Warner. Due to the delays Boyette was unavailable for the second issue, whose artwork Sonny Trinidad drew instead.

Most of the rest of the planned stories would appear in the back-up story in The Rampaging Hulk (1977) which led up to Bloodstone's death. This was told in #8, after the feature was replaced in #7 by an unrelated feature, and now written by Steve Gerber rather than Warner. Other parts of his history would be told through flashbacks in titles like Captain America: Sentinel of Liberty (1999), and more of the background to his death was filled-in by The Bloodstone Hunt storyline in the regular Captain America comic (1989). His adventures with the Monster Hunters were told in Marvel Universe (1998) and Marvel: The Lost Generation (2000).

== Fictional character biography ==
Cover to Marvel Presents: Bloodstone #1, October 1975

In the Hyborian Age, a meteorite landed on Earth in Northern Vanaheim on the European continent, circa 8250 B.C. It was controlled by an evil extra-dimensional entity called the Hellfire Helix, which wanted to conquer the world. To that end, it sent its agent, Ulluxy'l Kwan Tae Syn, to get the meteorite and find a host for it. However, a local human hunter/gatherer found the rock, and fought Ulluxy'l Kwan Tae Syn. In the fight, the meteor was smashed, a part of it (also called the Bloodgem) was imbedded in the human's chest, and the explosion killed the human's tribe. The human vowed revenge on Ulluxy'l Kwan Tae Syn. Because of the gem in his chest, he became immortal, and later became known as Ulysses Bloodstone.

Ulysses Bloodstone was one of the most successful mercenaries in the world. His long life allowed him to assemble a vast fortune, which he used to set up a series of outposts, fully staffed and equipped, in various corners of the world. He gained mastery of most of the world's weaponry, and a large portion of the world's martial arts and languages.

Over the next 10,000 years, Bloodstone would travel all over the world, looking for Ulluxy'l Kwan Tae Syn. As a result, by the 20th century, he had become immensely wealthy, and could speak most of the world's languages. In his hunt for Ulluxy'l Kwan Tae Syn, he had become a mercenary, adventurer, and soldier-of-fortune, proficient with most of the world's weaponry. Due to Ulluxy'l Kwan Tae Syn's ability to summon monsters from another dimension, which Ulluxy'l did specifically to keep Bloodstone away from him, Bloodstone gained a reputation as a monster hunter. In the 1950s, he became a member of the Monster Hunters, of whom he remained a member until they disbanded.

Bloodstone met two future allies, Brad Carter and P.D.Q. Warner, (Note: These had previously appeared in Nick Fury, Agent of S.H.I.E.L.D. #2, for July 1968.) who sought giant humanoid monsters to battle. A fight between Possessor and Bloodstone occurred during this time in which he was able to defeat his foe with the help of the Bloodgem. He battled the giant undersea humanoid monster Goram while seeking another Bloodstone fragment. Goram was subdued by the technology of Bloodstone Island, and then Ulysses Bloodstone fought Killer Shrike. Bloodstone met Iron Man, then battled Goram and his master Centurius. (Note: Centurius had also first appeared in Nick Fury, Agent of S.H.I.E.L.D. #2.)

Bloodstone's vendetta against the Hellfire Helix ends after he learns that the Helix had chosen him as a host. As Bloodstone and Ulluxy'l Kwan Tae Syn battle, the Helix assembles a group called the Conspiracy to reassemble the meteorite and gain control of Bloodstone. Bloodstone faces off against the Conspirators, who manage to defeat him and remove the Bloodstone from his chest. However, Bloodstone manages to kill Ulluxy'l Kwan Tae Syn and the Helix before dying.

== Powers and abilities ==
The mystic Bloodstone fragment embedded in Ulysses Bloodstone's chest emanated magical energy which increased his physical strength, speed, stamina, agility, reflexes, and senses to superhuman levels. The Bloodstone also provided vast regenerative capabilities that enabled his rapid regeneration of injured or missing body tissue with much greater speed and efficiency than an ordinary human. The more extensive the injury, the longer it would take for him to heal it fully. Bloodstone's healing ability was sufficiently developed for him to be able to regenerate severed limbs, which he did at least once. On this occasion, Bloodstone entered a state of self-induced hibernation which could last for years. Aside from his greatly enhanced healing, the Bloodgem rendered Bloodstone virtually immortal in the sense that he was immune to the effects of aging and to all known diseases. Bloodstone's life was dependent upon the presence of the fragment and, as a result, he had ceased to require food, water, or air to survive. However, if he was forcefully separated from the gem, then that forceful separation would kill him; indeed, when Dr. Bardham removed the fragment from his chest, it did kill him.

Aside from his physical attributes, the Bloodstone provided certain psionic abilities to Ulysses Bloodstone. He possessed a kind of invisible third eye on his forehead that allowed him to see human auras, which enabled him to see people even in total darkness, and the ability to travel mentally onto any one of the various astral planes of existence. Bloodstone also possessed some degree of psychokinesis, the limits of which were never discovered, but which also enabled him to detonate certain explosives by means of such psychokinesis.

Bloodstone's greatly extended lifespan afforded him many lifetimes' worth of time to study virtually anything he wished to learn. Thus, he had acquired a high degree in expertise in virtually all forms of armed and unarmed combat. In the modern era, he used a variety of different weapons, including high-caliber firearms, swords, and knives. He carried a specially designed sawed-off shotgun whose shells he could detonate mentally, as well as a stainless steel Bowie knife and .45 caliber semi-automatic handguns. He wore a flak jacket with storage pouches for a variety of weapons and ammunition.

== Children ==
=== Elsa Bloodstone ===
Elsa Bloodstone is the daughter of Ulysses Bloodstone. She was the star of her own mini-series simply titled Bloodstone.

=== Cullen Bloodstone ===
Cullen Bloodstone is the son of Ulysses Bloodstone and a student at the Braddock Academy. He was among the 16 teenagers who were captured by Arcade and brought to Murderworld so that Arcade could have the teenagers fight to the death.

== Other versions ==
=== Earth X ===
An alternate universe version of Ulysses Bloodstone appears in Earth X. Following his death, he joins with dozens of other deceased heroes in attempt to stop the genocidal plans of Mephisto and Thanos.

=== Nextwave ===
Ulysses Bloodstone appears in flashbacks in the series Nextwave, which Marvel editor-in-chief Joe Quesada initially stated to be non-canonical and set in an alternate universe. However, it is later retconned that the events of Nextwave are canon, with the series' Elsa Bloodstone supplanting the original main continuity version. (Note: For more information see Nextwave#Continuity.)

== Collected editions ==
Title	Material collected	Published date	ISBN
Bloodstone & The Legion of Monsters	Astonishing Tales: Boom Boom and Elsa #1, Legion of Monsters (vol. 2) #1-4, Marvel Presents #1-2, Marvel Monsters: From the Files of Ulysses Bloodstone & the Monster Hunters, material from Marvel Assistant-Sized Spectacular #2, Girl Comics (vol. 2) #2, Rampaging Hulk #1-6, 8	September 2017	978-1302908027
Marvel Horror Lives Again! Omnibus	Tomb Of Dracula #10, 67; Fear #24; Marvel Preview #3; Incredible Hulk (vol. 1) #162, 180-181, 272; X-Men (vol. 1) #139-140; Marvel Spotlight #24; Marvel Premiere #27; Marvel Team-Up #80-81; Giant-Size Chillers #1; X-Men Annual #6; War Is Hell #9-15; Man-Thing #10-11; Marvel Presents #1-2; and material from Vampire Tales #2-4, 6, 8-9; Marvel Preview #7-8, 12, 16; Monsters Unleashed (vol. 1) #9; Haunt Of Horror #2, 4-5; Dracula Lives #10-11; Tomb Of Dracula Magazine #3, 5-6; Solo Avengers #5; Rampaging Hulk Magazine #1-6, 8; Strange Tales (vol. 1) #73; Legion Of Monsters #1	October 2020	978-1302927462
Captain America: The Bloodstone Hunt	Captain America (vol. 1) #357-362	July 1993	978-0871359728
Captain America Epic Collection: The Bloodstone Hunt	Captain America (vol. 1) #351-371	April 2018	978-1302910020

== In other media ==
- A Bloodstone TV series was considered for development in 2001.
- Ulysses Bloodstone's corpse appears in the Marvel Cinematic Universe / Disney+ special Werewolf by Night, performed by Erik Beck and voiced by Richard Dixon. Following his death prior to the special, Ulysses' corpse is automated so his wife Verussa Bloodstone can deliver his last will and testament to his fellow hunters and choose a successor. It is later destroyed by Man-Thing after he incinerates Verussa and tosses her at it.
