= Joe Magarac =

Pseudo-legendary American folk hero

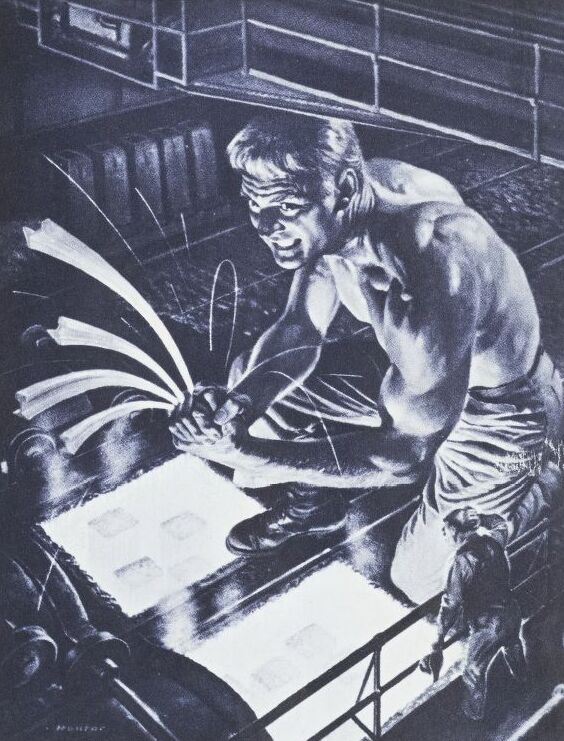
Joe Magarac depicted working with molten steel in an Armco Steel internal publication, 1964.

Joe Magarac (Note: English: /ˈmæɡəˌræk/ Serbo-Croatian pronunciation: [mǎɡarat͡s]) is a pseudo-legendary American folk hero. Originally presented as oral folklore told by steelworkers in the city of Pittsburgh, since the 1950s he has been considered an example of pseudo-folklore. He is described as a superhuman steelworker who immigrated from Eastern Europe to western Pennsylvania, where he shaped steel with his bare hands and produced many times the output of a normal laborer. He is a popular symbol of Pittsburgh and its historic steel industry.

== Origin ==
Joe Magarac's first attestation is in a 1931 Scribner's short story, "The Saga of Joe Magarac: Steelman," written by former Pittsburgh steelworker Owen Francis. The story, which is told in a contrived "Hunkie dialect," is presented as having originated at the turn of the 20th century, when Eastern European immigrants first came to work in Pittsburgh's steel mills. Francis claimed to have learned of Joe Magarac through working for many years alongside the "Hunkies"; retellings by later authors cite similar unprovable origins, casting doubt on Joe Magarac's existence before Francis's short story.

The character is variously and non-exclusively theorized as having been a practical joke at Francis's expense, a contrivance drawing from the popularity of Paul Bunyan, or having originated among the steelworkers as a satire of overwork; the Croatian insult magarac ('jackass, donkey'), which immigrant steelworkers jokingly used to refer to an overworked person, lends support to the third hypothesis. Conversely, Richard Dorson stated bluntly that Magarac "was hatched in the fancy of Owen Francis," and Gilley and Burnett (1998), after surveying the character's history and reception, concluded that Magarac is "misfit for his context."

In spite of his dubious origins, Joe Magarac took on a life of his own, diffusing through American oral and popular culture in the 1930s through 1950s. Francis's story served as a foundation to which later storytellers added their own embellishments, leading to the oral modification of the Joe Magarac narrative during the 1930s. These oral narratives were conscious of the challenges faced by industrial laborers: one variant, collected by a Works Progress Administration folklorist, recounted Joe Magarac being asked by his co-workers to reduce his working hours, and to leave some of his work for other people. These pro-labor variants did not last long: by the 1940s they were overwhelmed and displaced by corporate and mass-media retellings, which hewed closer to Francis's original short story. These portrayed the character as an ideal immigrant laborer, and prominently cast his name—"Magarac"—as positively referring to his diligent and tireless work, much like that of a mule.

Joe Magarac's origins as pseudo-folklore were established in 1953, when the folklorist Hyman Richman conducted field work among steelworkers of Slovak descent, and found that they had never heard of the character. Richman also uncovered the origins of the word magarac as a term of derision, "never used without a sneer." Nonetheless, Magarac in some ways reflects the real working conditions of Pittsburgh's immigrant steelworkers, who customarily worked 12-hour shifts, occasionally punctuated by a 24-hour "swing shift."

== Story ==
Joe Magarac was a "Hunkie" of indeterminate ethnicity: he is variously described as Hungarian, Serbian, Croatian, Bohemian, or Slovak. He was a giant with "arms the size of smokestacks" who was born in an iron ore mine—"perhaps in the old country"—raised in a furnace, and made of solid steel. He worked unceasingly at a western Pennsylvania steel mill where he accomplished many superhuman feats, such as twisting ingots into horseshoe and pretzel shapes, stirring molten steel with his bare hands, "making cannonballs like children make snowballs," and instantly traveling across the mill to rescue imperiled workers. He wanted to do nothing except work and eat, and because he never slept or took a break, he could do the work of 29 men.

One day, Joe appeared in a local village (Note: Variously identified either as Braddock, Pennsylvania or the fictional "Hunkietown.") where a contest of strength was being held. The contestants had to lift three dolly bars of increasing size, and the winner would marry Mary Mestrovich, the beautiful daughter of Steve Mestrovich. (Note: Sometimes identified as a generic "mill boss.") Joe handily beat the competition, lifting both the heaviest dolly bar and one of the contestants. After winning, he lifted his shirt, revealing that he was made of steel. He didn't know of the prize when he came to compete, and since he had no use for a wife—he was too busy working at the mill—he let Mary marry her true love, runner-up Pete Pussick.

Joe was so good at producing railroad track, which he made by squeezing steel through his fingers, that the area around the mills was quickly covered in railroads. Unfortunately, he made too much track, and the mills had to shut down. When the mills reopened and the steelworkers returned, they found Joe, despondent and in want of work, melting himself down in a furnace so he could become "the finest steel in the world." He wanted to be used for the construction of a new mill, effectively "giving his life for the steel industry."

Different retellings embellish Magarac's ultimate fate. One version of the tale states that he is still alive: it suggests that he is in an abandoned mill, waiting for the day that the furnace burns again. Another from 1980, recalling the steel crisis of the 1970s, claims that the mill which Joe becomes will "never be shut down." In the 1948 children's book Joe Magarac and His USA Citizen Papers, the character is incorporated into the steel of the United States Capitol, and goes on a rampage through Washington, D.C. after overhearing two xenophobic politicians disparage immigrants.

Francis's original short story ends with an explanation of the word magarac, claiming that its users take pride in it: "Dat is why when somebody call Hunkie magarac he only laughit and feel proud as anyting, and dat is why we catch the best mill for anyplace, ya damn right [sic]!"

== Legacy ==
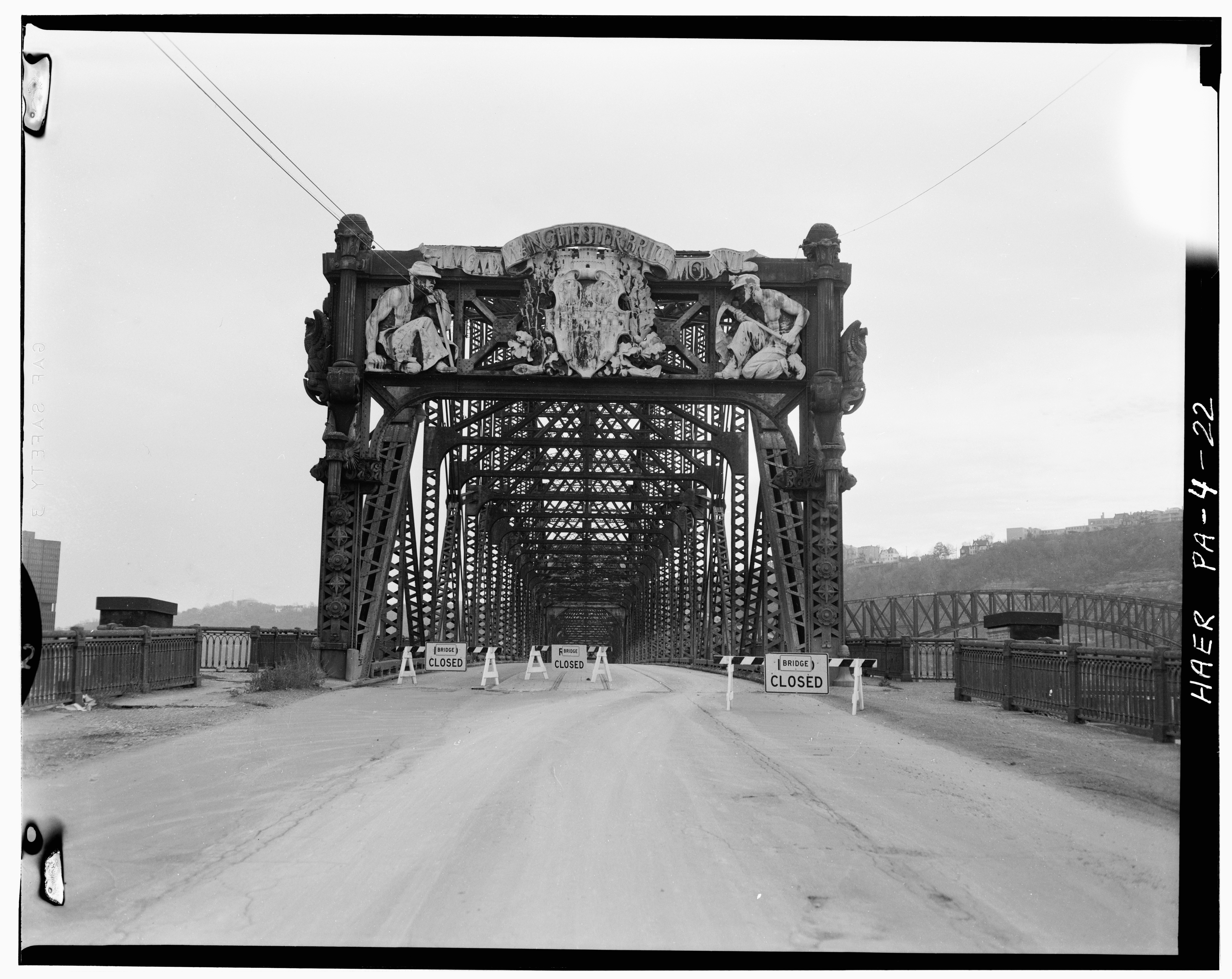
The Manchester Bridge viewed from Pittsburgh's North Side, 1970. The two statues are sometimes identified with Joe Magarac and Jan Volkanik, another fictional industrial worker.

After the collapse of Pittsburgh's steel industry, many Pittsburghers have used the Joe Magarac character as an embodiment of the city and its history. He has been used this way by a local tabloid newspaper, amusement parks, a play, and the Tri-State Conference on Steel's "Joe Magarac award." When a series of public murals portraying Pittsburgh's history was proposed in the 1990s, some residents suggested that Joe Magarac be used as their central character.

An amusement park near Pittsburgh, Kennywood, had a statue of Joe Magarac in a scene along the Olde Kennywood Railroad, the park's riding railroad. He was depicted bending a red-hot steel beam into shape for use in one of the park's roller coasters. In 2009, the statue was donated to US Steel Corporation and has since been re-erected at the entrance to the company's Edgar Thomson Works. He is similarly depicted on the Conneaut Lake Park riding railroad, where he is described as the area's "biggest, baddest steelworker."

One of four human sculptures salvaged from the demolished Manchester Bridge in Pittsburgh is said to be of Magarac, but some sources identify the figure only generically as a mill worker. Mounted to the bridge in 1917, the sculpture predates any documented mention of Magarac. As of 2016, it was in storage.

== In popular culture ==
One version of the Magarac story was recorded in song by The New Christy Minstrels on their 1964 Columbia Records release Land of Giants: "We're gonna build a railroad down to Frisco and back, from Maine down to Mexico. Who's gonna make the steel for that track? It's Joe... Magarac."

In the 1977 DC Comics story "Captain Marvel Fights the Man of Steel" in Shazam! #30 (written by E. Nelson Bridwell), Dr. Thaddeus Sivana creates a robotic version of Joe Magarac to challenge Captain Marvel.

A large statue of Joe Magarac pouring molten steel is a prominent landmark in the city of Steelport in Saints Row: The Third. The statue is also highlighted in Saints Row IV as a weapon in a scene where the player animates it and uses it to fight a giant energy drink mascot.

== See also ==
- Culture of Pittsburgh
- John Henry (folklore)
- Steely McBeam
