= Al Milgrom =

American comic book writer (born 1950)

- Milgrom at GalaxyCon San Jose in 2026
- Born: Allen L. Milgrom; March 6, 1950 (age 76) Detroit, Michigan, U.S.
- Areas: Writer, Penciller, Inker, Editor
- Notable works: The Avengers; Captain Marvel; Firestorm; West Coast Avengers; The Spectacular Spider-Man; Secret Wars II
- Awards: Comics Buyer's Guide Fan Award (1982); Inkwell Awards Special Recognition Award (2017); Inkwell Awards Joe Sinnott Hall of Fame (2025)

Allen L. Milgrom (born March 6, 1950) is an American comic book artist (penciller and inker), writer, and editor, primarily for Marvel Comics. He is known for his 10-year run as editor of Marvel Fanfare; his long involvement as writer, penciler, and inker on Peter Parker, The Spectacular Spider-Man; his four-year tenure as West Coast Avengers penciller; and his long stint as the inker of X-Factor. He often inks Jim Starlin's work. Milgrom is the co-creator of DC superhero Firestorm.

== Early life ==
Al Milgrom grew up in Detroit, Michigan, and graduated from the University of Michigan in 1972. Milgrom is Jewish. However, he stated that he avoids putting Jewish themes in his work.

== Career ==
West Coast Avengers #1 (Oct. 1985). Cover art by penciler Milgrom and inker Joe Sinnott.

Milgrom started his comics career in 1972 as an assistant for inker Murphy Anderson. During that period, Milgrom contributed to Charlton Comics' Many Ghosts of Doctor Graves, Star*Reach, and comics published by Warren Publishing and Atlas/Seaboard, before joining with Marvel. Milgrom also worked as a "Crusty Bunker" for Neal Adams' Continuity Associates in 1977.

At one point Milgrom lived in the same Queens apartment building as artists Walt Simonson, Howard Chaykin, and Bernie Wrightson. Simonson recalls, "We'd get together at 3 a.m. They'd come up and we'd have popcorn and sit around and talk about whatever a 26, 27 and 20-year-old guys talk about. Our art, TV, you name it. I pretty much knew at the time, 'These are the good ole days.'"

Milgrom came to prominence as a penciller on Captain Marvel from 1975 to 1977. He penciled the Guardians of the Galaxy feature in Marvel Presents, which was written by Steve Gerber and Roger Stern. Milgrom worked as editor at DC Comics from 1977 to 1978. While at DC, he co-created Ronnie Raymond, the original Firestorm, with writer Gerry Conway.

Milgrom was an editor for Marvel Comics beginning in 1979, and editing Marvel Fanfare for its full ten-year run (#1–60, March 1982–January 1992). As editor of The Incredible Hulk, he designed the costumes of the U-Foes. He drew The Avengers (1983–85), West Coast Avengers (1985–88), Kitty Pryde and Wolverine (1984–85), and Secret Wars II (1985–86), and wrote the Mephisto limited series (1987).

Milgrom wrote and drew The Spectacular Spider-Man #90–100 (1984–85), and The Incredible Hulk (1986–87). In 1991, he wrote a story arc for The Amazing Spider-Man and collaborated with Danny Fingeroth on The Deadly Foes of Spider-Man limited series.

Milgrom has been a prolific inker, working on most of Marvel's line. He served an eight-year stint as the inker of X-Factor in 1989–1997. He inked Ron Frenz on Thor in 1991–1993 and Thunderstrike from 1994 to 1995. Other series he has worked on include Captain America, Generation X, The Micronauts, and the Uncanny X-Men. Milgrom inked the limited series A-Next, J2, Marvel: The Lost Generation, and Thanos. He was additionally an inker on The Spectacular Spider-Man from 1996 to 1998.

In 2001 Milgrom was fired from his Marvel staff job when it was discovered he had added hidden slanderous comments against editor-in-chief Bob Harras in the background of a page in the comic book Universe X Special: Spidey. Milgrom went on to freelance for Marvel, mostly inking Jim Starlin's work. He also started to work for Archie Comics on a regular basis, inking a variety of titles. Beginning in the early 2000s, Milgrom freelanced for DC again, providing inks for titles like Mystery in Space (vol. 2), Ambush Bug: Year None, and Strange Adventures (vol. 3).

== Awards ==
In 2009, Cleburne: A Graphic Novel, written and pencilled by Justin S. Murphy and inked by Milgrom, was nominated for the Independent Book Publishers Association's Benjamin Franklin Awards. In 2016, Milgrom was nominated and tied for runner-up for the Inkwell Awards Special Recognition Award. In 2017, he was awarded an Inkwell Awards Special Recognition Award. In 2025, Milgrom was inducted into the Inkwell Awards Joe Sinnott Hall of Fame.

== Personal life ==
Milgrom married fellow Detroit native Judy Lewin in early 1979. They have a daughter, Rachel, and two sons, Ben and Josh.

== In popular culture ==
Milgrom is referenced in Ant-Man as the name of a hotel that Scott Lang and his crew stay at.

== Bibliography ==
Work as inker, unless noted otherwise.

=== Archie Comics ===
- Archie #518, 528, 545, 565, 620 (2002–2011)
- Archie & Friends #65, 67, 69, 74, 97, 130–131, 153 (2003–2011)
- Archie Digest #209 (writer/inker), #243 (2004–2008)
- Archie Double Digest (Jumbo Comics) #231 (2012)
- Archie's Double Digest #148, 159, 185, 207, 220, 228–229, 251, 282 (2004–2017)
- Archie's Holiday Fun Digest #7 (2004)
- Archie's Pals 'n' Gals Double Digest #92, 117, 126, 132, 135–137, 143 (2005–2010)
- Archie 1000 Page Comics-Palooza oneshot (2014)
- Betty #104 (2001)
- Betty & Veronica #87, 165, 170, 207–208, 211–213, 216–219, 221–225, 232, 238, 252 (1995, 2001–2011)
- Betty & Veronica Digest #126, 133, 157, 161, 163, 183 (2002–2008)
- Betty & Veronica Double Digest #112, 153, 159, 174–175, 180–181, 184, 216, 242 (2003–2016)
- B&V Friends Double Digest #246, 274, 284 (2016, 2019–2020)
- Jughead's Double Digest #97, 171, 177 (2003–2012)
- Jughead with Archie Digest #188, 190, 194, 196 (2004)
- Laugh Comics Digest #196 (2004)
- Tales from Riverdale Featuring Archie & His Friends oneshot (2006)
- Tales from Riverdale Digest #1, 4, 11, 38 (2005–2010)
- Veronica #69, 72, 74, 124–125 (1997–1998, 2002)
- World of Archie Double Digest #4, 7 (2011)

=== Atlas/Seaboard Comics ===
- Destructor #4 (1975)
- Morlock 2001 #1–2 (1975)
- Tiger-Man #3 (1975)
- Western Action #1 (1975)

=== Capstone Publishers ===
- George Eastman and the Kodak Camera (artist, with Gordon Purcell) (2007)

=== Dark Horse Comics ===
- Dark Horse Presents #109 (writer/artist) (1996)
- Dark Horse Book of Monsters (2006)

=== DC Comics ===
- 1st Issue Special #11 (1976)
- Action Comics #462 (1976)
- Ambush Bug: Year None #1–5, 7 (2008–2009)
- Blackhawk #247 (1976)
- Cancelled Comic Cavalcade #1 (1978)
- DC Comics Presents: Superman #1 (2004)
- DC Universe: Legacies #6 (2010)
- Detective Comics #450–451 (Robin) (penciller), #460–461, 469–470 (Batman) (1975–1977)
- Doom Patrol vol. 5 #16 (2011)
- Firestorm #1–5 (penciller) (1978)
- Firestorm vol. 2 #100 (artist) (1990)
- Fury of Firestorm Annual #4 (artist) (1986)
- Hawkman Special #1 (artist) (2008)
- Heroes Against Hunger #1 (1986)
- House of Mystery #234 (artist), #277 (1975–1980)
- Isis #8 (1977)
- JLA #76 (2003)
- JLA: Classified #35 (2007)
- JSA #33 (2002)
- Kobra #4 (penciller, with Pat Gabriele) (1976)
- Legion #16, 25, 31 (2003–2004)
- Man-Bat #1 (1975)
- Mystery in Space vol. 2 #1–8 (2006–2007)
- Orion #18 (penciller) (2001)
- Power Company Josiah Power #1 (2002)
- Rann/Thanagar: Holy War #6 (2008)
- Richard Dragon, Kung-Fu Fighter #2 (1975)
- Sgt. Rock #303–304 (1977)
- Showcase #101–103 (Hawkman and Adam Strange) (penciller) (1978)
- Son of Vulcan #5 (2005)
- Strange Adventures vol. 3 #1–8 (2009)
- Superman #292 (1975)
- The Superman Family #182–183 (1977)
- Sword of Sorcery #5 (1973)
- Tom Strong's Terrific Tales #10 (2004)
- Unknown Soldier #234 (1979)
- World's Finest Comics #243 (1977)

=== DC Comics and Marvel Comics ===
- The Incredible Hulk vs. Superman #1 (1999)
- Iron Lantern #1 (1997)
- Speed Demon #1 (1996)

=== Image Comics ===
- Generation X/Gen^{13} #1 (1998)

=== Marvel Comics ===
- A-Next #5–12 (1999)
- Adventures of Cyclops and Phoenix #4 (1994)
- Alpha Flight #58–62, 64–65 (1988)
- The Amazing Spider-Man #194, #195 (inker), #196 (penciller), #208–209, 218, 223 (inker), #353–358, #371–372 (writer), #376, 381, 384, 400, 402, 411, 415, 429, Annual #11 (inker) (1977–1997)
- The Amazing Spider-Man vol. 2 #13 (2000)
- The Avengers #228–232, 234, 236–250 (penciller), #370 (inker), Annual #11, 22 (penciller), #23 (writer/artist) (1982–1984, 1993–1994)
- Avengers Spotlight #21–25, 27–28, 30–34, 36 (Hawkeye) (penciller) (1989–1990)
- Avengers: The Ultron Imperative #1 (among others) (2001)
- Bizarre Adventures #32, 34 (writer/artist) (1982–1983)
- Bullwinkle and Rocky #2–9 (1988–1989)
- Cable #2–4, 10, 24 (1993–1995)
- Captain America #256 (inker), #260 (writer/inker), #340–357 (inker) (1981, 1988–1989)
- Captain Marvel #29 (inker), #37–42 (penciller), #43–45 (artist), #46–53 (penciller) (1973–1977)
- Captain Marvel vol. 3 #11, 17–18 (2000–2001)
- Crazy Magazine #68, 71 (artist) (1980–1981)
- Daredevil #241, Annual #5 (1987–1989)
- Darkdevil #1–3 (2000–2001)
- Deadly Foes of Spider-Man #1–4 (artist/penciller) (1991)
- Deadly Hands of Kung-Fu #1–4, 7–8 (1974–1975)
- Defenders #69, 94–95, 100–101, 104–108 (1979–1982)
- Doctor Strange #24–25 (penciller), #45–46 (inker) (1977, 1981)
- Excalibur #21–22, 25, 30–31, 35–36 (1990–1991)
- Factor-X #1–4 (1995)
- Fantastic Five #1–5 (1999–2000)
- Fantastic Four #208 (inker), #296 (penciller, among others), #348–350 (inker), #355 (artist), Annual #24 (writer/artist) (1979, 1986–1991)
- Fantastic Four vol. 3 #19 (penciller) (1999)
- Fantastic Four Roast #1 (artist, two pages) (1982)
- Fantastic Four: World's Greatest Comics Magazine #11 (penciller, among others) (2001)
- Flintstone Kids #1 (1987)
- Gambit and the X-Ternals #2–4 (1995)
- Generation X #11, 15–16 (1996)
- Ghost Rider #35 (penciller, with Jim Starlin) (1979)
- Ghost Rider vol. 2 #69, 87 (1996–1997)
- Ghost Rider/Wolverine/Punisher: Dark Design #1 (1995)
- Giant Size Defenders #1 (1974)
- Giant Size Spider-Man #2 (1974)
- Haunt of Horror #3 (1974)
- Hawkeye: Earth's Mightiest Marksman #1 (1998)
- Heroes for Hope Starring the X-Men #1 (among others) (1985)
- Howard the Duck #30–31 (1979)
- Hydrators #1–2 (promo) (penciller) (1999)
- The Incredible Hulk #320–324 (writer/penciller), #325–327 (writer), #329 (writer/penciller), #330 (writer/inker), #434–435, Annual #9–10, 2001 (inker) (1980–1981, 1986–1987, 1995, 2001)
- Infinity Abyss #1–6 (2002)
- Infinity Crusade #1–6 (1993)
- Infinity War #1–6 (1992)
- Iron Fist #7, #14 (cover artist) (1977)
- Iron Man #158 (1982)
- Iron Man/X-O Manowar: Heavy Metal #1 (1996)
- J2 #1–12 (1998–1999)
- Journey Into Mystery #512–513, 520–521 (1997–1998)
- Kitty Pryde and Wolverine #1–6 (artist) (1984–1985)
- Kull the Destroyer #13 (1974)
- Marvel Adventures #13 (1998)
- Marvel Comics Presents #1–4 (writer/artist), 15–17, 68, 70 (1988–1991)
- Marvel Comics Super Special #1 (Kiss) (1977)
- Marvel Fanfare #12 (artist), #20–21, 57, 59 (1985, 1991)
- Marvel Holiday Special #1–2 (1991–1992)
- Marvel Premiere #39–40 (Torpedo) (1977–1978)
- Marvel Presents #3–12 (Guardians of the Galaxy) (penciller, full art for #4) (1976–1977)
- Marvel Saga #1, 3 (1985–1986)
- Marvel Super-Heroes #5 (1991)
- Marvel Team-Up Annual #3 (Hulk/Power Man/Iron Fist) (1980)
- Marvel Team-Up vol. 2 #2 (1997)
- Marvel: The Lost Generation #12–1 (2000–2001)
- Marvel Treasury Edition #28 (Superman and Spider-Man) (background inks) (1981)
- Marvel Universe: The End #1–6 (2003)
- Master of Kung Fu #17–21 (inker), #23 (penciller), #24 (penciller, among others) (1974–1975)
- Mephisto vs. ... #1–4 (writer) (1987)
- Micronauts #9–18 (1979–1980)
- Ms. Marvel #21 (1978)
- New Mutants #70, 84, Annual #6 (1988–1990)
- New Warriors Annual 2 (among others) (1992)
- Nightwatch #1–3 (1994)
- Nova vol. 3 #5 (1999)
- Psi-Force #6 (1987)
- Punisher #76 (1993)
- Punisher War Journal #12, 17–20, 24 (1989–1990)
- Questprobe #2 (Spider-Man) (writer/penciller) (1985)
- Red Sonja #13–14 (1979)
- Rocket Raccoon #3 (1985)
- Rom #18, 24 Annual #4 (1981–1985)
- Savage Hulk #1 (1996)
- Savage She-Hulk 24–25 (1982)
- Savage Tales #5 (Conan) (1974)
- Secret Wars II #1–9 (penciller) (1985–1986)
- Sensational She-Hulk #9–10 (1989)
- Sensational Spider-Man #25 (1998)
- Sergio Aragones Massacres Marvel #1 (among others) (1996)
- Solo Avengers #14–17 (Hawkeye) (penciller) (1989)
- Special Marvel Edition #15 (Master of Kung-Fu) (1974)
- The Spectacular Spider-Man #67, 69, 70, 72 (inker), #73, 75–79, 81–82, 85–89 (penciller), #90–96 (writer/penciller), #97–99 (writer), #100 (writer/penciller), #223, 231, 251–252, 258–263, Annual #7, 13 (inker) (1982–1998)
- Spider-Man #26, 37 (1992–1993)
- Spider-Man: Chapter One #9–12 (1999)
- Spider-Man: Maximum Clonage Alpha #1 (1995)
- Spider-Man: Funeral for an Octopus #1–3 (1995)
- Spider-Man Unlimited #4 (1994)
- Spider-Man: The Parker Years #1 (1995)
- Spidey Super Stories #55 (artist, one page) (1981)
- Star Wars #17 (1978)
- Strange Tales #181 (Warlock) (1975)
- Star Trek: Deep Space Nine #1–7, 10–11, 14 (1996–1998)
- Star Trek: Voyager #9, 13–15 (1997–1998)
- Star Trek Voyager: Splashdown #1, 3–4 (1998)
- Tales from the Age of Apocalypse: Sinister Bloodlines #1 (1997)
- Thanos #1–12 (2003–2004)
- Thor #302, 308, 392, 430–459 Annual #14, 16 (1980–1981, 1988–1993)
- Thor vol. 2 # (2001)
- Thunderbolts #0, 42, '97 (1997–2000)
- Thunderstrike #1–6, 8–10, 12–24 (1993–1995)
- Toxic Avenger #4 (1991)
- Ultimate Spider-Man Super Special #1 (among others) (2002)
- Uncanny X-Men #292, 298, Annual #17 (1992–1993)
- Universe X Special: Spidey (2001)
- Untold Tales of Spider-Man #5–6, -1 (1996–1997)
- U.S. 1 #1–7 (writer) (1983)
- Venom: Lethal Protector #1–4 (1993)
- Venom: Funeral Pyre #1–2 (1993)
- Venom: The Madness #3 (1994)
- Venom: Nights of Vengeance #1–4 (1994)
- Venom: Tooth and Claw #1–3 (1996–1997)
- Warlock Chronicles #7 (1994)
- Web of Spider-Man #71, 91, 112, Annual #5 (1989–1994)
- West Coast Avengers #1–37, 39–40 (penciller, also writer for #30), Annual #2 (artist), #3 (penciller) (1985–1989)
- What If #25 (among others) (1981)
- What the--?! #1 (inker), #2 (writer) (1988)
- Wild Thing #1, 5 (1999–2000)
- Wolverine #29, 44, 76, 80, 84 (1990–1994)
- X-Factor #38–62, 71–104, 106–117, 119–129, 130, Annual #3, 5, 6, 8 (1988–1997)
- X-Force #25 (1993)
- X-Men Annual #2 (1993)
- X-Men: Prime #1 (1995)
- X-Men Unlimited #6 (among others) (1994)
- X-Men Vs. the Avengers #4 (1987)
- X-Terminators #1–4 (1988–1989)

=== Rampart Press ===
- Cleburne: A Graphic Novel (2008)

=== Sitcomics ===
- Barbara Macabre's Morbid Museum #1.1 (artist) (2019)
- Blue Baron Binge Book #3 (2020)

=== Star Reach ===
- Star Reach #1–2 (1974–1975)

=== Texas Trio ===
- Star-Studded Comics #8 (writer), #10 (inker/letterer) (1966–1967)

=== Totally Galactic Comics ===
- Jetta Raye Adventures (penciller) (2020)

=== Warren Publishing ===
- Eerie #48–50, 52–53 (writer) (1973–1974)

Comic book series
Preceded by Jim Starlin	Captain Marvel penciller 1975–1977	Succeeded by Pat Broderick
Preceded by Sonny Trinidad	Marvel Presents penciller 1976–1977	Succeeded by n/a
Preceded by Bob McLeod	Micronauts inker 1979–1980	Succeeded by Armando Gil
Preceded by Bob Hall	Marvel Team-Up editor (with Jim Shooter); 1979–1980	Succeeded by Dennis O'Neil
Preceded by Ed Hannigan	Peter Parker, the Spectacular Spider-Man penciller 1982–1984	Succeeded by Herb Trimpe
Preceded by Sal Buscema	The Avengers penciller 1983–1984	Succeeded by Bob Hall
Preceded by Bill Mantlo	Peter Parker, the Spectacular Spider-Man writer 1984–1985	Succeeded by Cary Burkett
Preceded by Bob Hall	West Coast Avengers penciller 1985–1989	Succeeded by John Byrne
Preceded by John Byrne	The Incredible Hulk writer 1986–1987	Succeeded by Peter David
Preceded by Tony DeZuniga	Captain America inker 1988–1989	Succeeded by Danny Bulanadi
Preceded by Bob Wiacek	X-Factor inker 1989–1997	Succeeded by Art Thibert
Preceded by Joe Sinnott	Thor inker 1991–1993	Succeeded by Mike DeCarlo
Preceded by Sandu Florea	Thunderstrike inker 1994–1995	Succeeded by n/a
Preceded by John Stanisci	Peter Parker, the Spectacular Spider-Man inker 1996–1998	Succeeded by n/a
