= Justin Murphy (comics) =

Justin Murphy is an independent publisher and creator of comics and graphic novels. He is also a playwright and composer. He co-wrote a play which won most outstanding musical at the New York International Fringe Festival. He is now working independently on a traditionally animated feature film, Dawgtown, since late-2010.

== Southern Blood comic book ==
His comics career began in 1992 when he self-published Southern Blood, a small press black and white series about the American Civil War. The book ran for 8 issues. Murphy discontinued the Southern Blood series and closed his company, JM Comics.

After finishing a BFA at Jacksonville University, Murphy took a break from comics to write plays for the stage. His first collaboration was a musical based on the characters from Southern Blood called Eagle Song. He wrote the libretto and co-wrote all the music with composer Roger Butterley, a sometime musical director for artist Phoebe Snow. Together they produced and released a complete symphonic recording starring Jamie-Lynn Sigler and numerous other Broadway actors. Murphy and Butterley also sang lead roles on the recording, but the show could not find a producer to stage it.

The duo continued to write however, and in 2006 produced the rock opera Fallen Angel at the New York International Fringe Festival. The musical tale of Lucifer's fall from Heaven won the Most Outstanding Musical Award at the festival that year.

== Cleburne: A Graphic Novel ==
In 2008, after two years of collaboration with Marvel artists Al Milgrom and J. Brown, Murphy made his return to comics with the graphic novel Cleburne. The 208-page, full color book told the true story of Confederate General Patrick Cleburne and his plan to enlist freed slaves to fight for the South. Murphy wrote and illustrated the book, with Milgrom and Brown providing the inks and colors. The book won a Xeric Foundation grant and earned a bronze Book of the Year Award in the graphic novel category from ForeWord Magazine It was also a finalist for the IBPA Benjamin Franklin Awards. A film adaptation is currently in development.

== Dawgtown ==
Dawgtown is an upcoming animated feature Murphy has been working on since late-2010 as the director, writer, producer and production designer. It's the story of a young pitbull named Max living in a brutal underground world of dog fighting. As a competitor in the most well funded pit-fighting organization in the world, he now must lead the other dogs in a dangerous break for freedom, in a similar vein to the Book of Exodus.

The film is currently being made with the use of traditional 2D animation, created at Justin's own Legacy Animation Studios, in the style of Urban and Graffiti art. It is scheduled to be released sometime in the 2020s.

== Works ==
- Eagle Song [Cast Recording], Omega Music
- Cleburne ISBN 978-0-9799579-0-1
