= Sonny Trinidad =

Filipino comics artist (1934-2009)

- Born: Celso L. Trinidad; July 28, 1934 Santa Rosa, Laguna, Philippines
- Died: November 23, 2009 (aged 75) Santa Rosa, Laguna, Philippines
- Areas: Penciller, Inker
- Awards: "Best Serial Illustrator", "Best Novel Illustration Fantasy" KOMOPEB Parangal sa Komiks (1984)

Celso L. "Sonny" Trinidad (July 28, 1934 – November 23, 2009) was a Filipino comics artist who worked in the Filipino and American comic book industries. In the U.S., he is mostly known for his work for Marvel Comics in the mid–1970s.

== Career ==
Trinidad began his professional career as an assistant for the "Dean of Philippine comics," Francisco Coching, and Trinidad's style bore a similarity to Choching's. Trinidad's first professional credits included illustrating novelist Marcial Buanno’s Guido Mortal and Arkong Bato in the late 1960s.

Trinidad co-created the Filipino superheroes El Gato (with writer Mike Tan) and Inday sa Balitaw (with writer Pablo S. Gomez).

Along with a number of other Filipino comics creators in the 1970s, Trinidad found work in the American comics industry, initially for DC Comics on such titles as The Witching Hour, House of Mystery, The Unexpected, and Weird Western Tales.

It was in the U.S. that he began using the pen name "Sonny" Trinidad. When he moved to Marvel Comics in 1974, he was given the moniker "Slammin' Sonny Trinidad" in the "Bullpen Bulletins". Trinidad supplied full art or inks over other artists (frequently John Romita Sr. and John Buscema) on horror titles such as Vampire Tales (Morbius the Living Vampire stories written by Doug Moench), Dracula Lives!, Marvel Chillers, and The Son of Satan, as well as fantasy and adventure titles like Skull the Slayer, The Savage Sword of Conan, and Deadly Hands of Kung Fu. Other highlights of Trinidad's tenure at Marvel included "Hellfire Helix Hex!," written by John Warner, for Marvel Presents #2 (Dec. 1975); in addition, Trinidad inked the feature story (written by Bill Mantlo and penciled by Tom Sutton) in Man From Atlantis #1 (Feb. 1978).

Trinidad was often hired to do adaptations. One of his biggest commissions was the black-and-white magazine one-shot Marvel Movie Premiere, which featured his and writer Marv Wolfman's adaptation of the 1975 movie The Land That Time Forgot. With writer Roy Thomas and penciler John Buscema, Trinidad adapted Robert E. Howard's "The Pool of the Black One" in Savage Sword of Conan #22–23 (Sept.–Oct. 1977). Trinidad and writer Doug Moench adapted H. G. Wells' The Food of the Gods and How It Came to Earth for Marvel Classics Comics #22 (1977).

By around 1990, Trinidad had returned to the world of Filipino komiks, with contributions to the horror comic book Holiday (a.k.a. Zuriga). In 1995, Trinidad supplied painted covers for the short-lived series Lastikman Komiks.

Trinidad was diagnosed with cancer in December 2008 and died about a year later. He was survived by his wife, Natalia; daughters, Nacel and Cherry; and son, Norman.

== Awards ==
Sonny Trinidad was honored as "Best Serial Illustrator" and "Best Novel Illustration Fantasy" for KOMOPEB Parangal sa Komiks (1984)

== Bibliography ==
=== DC Comics ===
- House of Mystery #214 (1973)
- The Unexpected #146, 157, 186 (1973–1978)
- Weird Western Tales #14 (1972)

=== Marvel Comics ===
- Amazing Adventures #36 (1976)
- Deadly Hands of Kung Fu #30–32 (1976–1977)
- The Deep #1 (1977)
- Dracula Lives #9, 12 (1974–1975)
- Haunt of Horror #4–5 (1974–1975)
- Ka-Zar vol. 2 #9 (1975)
- Man from Atlantis #1 (1978)
- Marvel Chillers #2 (1975)
- Marvel Classics Comics #13 (The Last of the Mohicans); #22 (The Food of the Gods and How It Came to Earth); #27 (Kidnapped) (1977)
- Marvel Movie Premiere #1 (The Land That Time Forgot adaptation) (1975)
- Marvel Presents #2 (1975)
- Marvel Preview #8, 12 (1976–1977)
- Marvel Spotlight #25 (The 7th Voyage of Sinbad adaptation) (1975)
- Monsters Unleashed #11 (1975)
- Planet of the Apes #23, 25 (1976)
- The Rampaging Hulk #4, 6 (1977)
- Savage Sword of Conan #6, 9, 19, 21–22 (1975–1977)
- Skull the Slayer #5, 7–8 (1976)
- Son of Satan #2–7 (1976)
- Vampire Tales #10–11 (1975)
