= Marvel: The Lost Generation =

2000–2001 Marvel Comics miniseries

- Cover of Marvel: The Lost Generation, vol. 1, #12 (March 2000), art by John Byrne and Allen Milgrom.

Publication information
- Publisher: Marvel Comics
- Schedule: Monthly
- Format: Limited series
- Genre: Superhero
- Publication date: March 2000 – February 2001
- No. of issues: 12
- Main character: First Line

Creative team
- Created by: Roger Stern; John Byrne
- Written by: Roger Stern; John Byrne
- Penciller: John Byrne
- Inker: Al Milgrom
- Letterer(s): James Novak; John Morelli
- Colorist: Glynis Oliver
- Editor: Ralph Macchio

Marvel: The Lost Generation is a twelve-issue comic book miniseries published by Marvel Comics in 2000 and 2001. The series was scripted by Roger Stern and drawn by John Byrne with both as co-plotters. Numbered in reverse order, it began with issue #12 (March 2000) and finished with issue #1 (Feb. 2001).

Marvel: The Lost Generation tells the story of superheroes active after World War II but before the debut of the Fantastic Four, which is considered to be the start of the "modern age" of heroes within the Marvel Universe. Although the Fantastic Four first appeared in comics in 1961, Marvel Comics uses a sliding timescale. The Lost Generation explored events in the gap between the retirement/disappearance of superheroes active during World War II and the emergence of the modern generation of heroes.

== Publication history ==
The series employed the unusual stylistic device of having the issues numbered in reverse (from #12 down to #1) and occurring in reverse chronological order. Thus, the first issue to be published (#12) depicted the final mission of its superhero team, and each issue thereafter showed progressively earlier events until the final issue (#1), which depicted the team's origin.

== Plot synopsis ==
Marvel: The Lost Generation starred the First Line, a loose confederation of superheroes, which lasted from the years shortly after World War II up to the early 1980s. Members of the First Line included the Yankee Clipper (uses a time traveler's force belt), Oxbow (a super-strong archer), Effigy (a Skrull shapeshifter posing as a super-powered human), Nightingale (a mysterious woman with precognitive and healing powers), Pixie and Major Mercury (both Eternals), Captain Hip and Sunshine (hippie heroes mutated by a government experiment) and their daughter Gadfly, Kid Justice (the younger brother and former sidekick of the Yankee Clipper who later became Mr. Justice), and the Black Fox (a non-superpowered vigilante), as well as other, less prominent heroes during their "decades-long" adventures. Members of the First Line encountered a number of established Marvel characters, including the Skrulls, Doctor Strange, Diablo, Namor the Sub-Mariner, Thor, Venus, the Monster Hunters of Ulysses Bloodstone, and Nick Fury.

During their final mission against a Skrull invasion force, almost all of the entire cast of characters is killed with Pixie as the only apparent survivor, and this, along with a government conspiracy to cover up the attempted alien invasion, was given as the in-story reason why the First Line and its exploits had gone unmentioned.

== Similar concepts ==
Marvel had earlier explored a similar concept of superheroes banding together after World War II in What If #9 (June 1978) "What If the Avengers Had Fought Evil During the 1950s?" In that comic, the heroes had been Marvel Boy, the 3-D Man, Venus (who appears in Lost Generation as the temporary thrall of a villain called Rumor), the Gorilla-Man, and the Human Robot, and featured Jann of the Jungle and Namora. This would form the basis for the Agents of Atlas.

The Monster Hunters, also featured in this series, had been created in a similar way in the pages of Marvel Universe. It featured Ulysses Bloodstone and Makkari was retconned as the character Hurricane.
