= The Rampaging Hulk =

Comic book series by Marvel Comics

- Cover of The Rampaging Hulk #1 (Jan. 1977). Art by Ken Barr

Publication information
- Publisher: Marvel Comics
- Schedule: List: (vol. 1) Bimonthly (vol. 2) Monthly
- Format: Ongoing series
- Genre: Superhero
- Publication date: List: (vol. 1) January 1977 – June 1981 (vol. 2) August 1998 – January 1999
- No. of issues: List: (vol. 1): 27 (vol. 2): 6
- Main character: The Hulk

Creative team
- Written by: List: (vol. 1) Doug Moench John Warner Steve Gerber Dennis O'Neil Lora Byrne (vol. 2) Glenn Greenberg
- Penciller: List: (vol. 1) Walt Simonson John Buscema Bob Brown Sal Buscema Jim Starlin Val Mayerik Keith Pollard Alan Kupperberg Herb Trimpe Ron Wilson Bill Sienkiewicz Gene Colan Howard Chaykin (vol. 2) Rick Leonardi
- Inker: List: (vol. 1) Alfredo Alcala Rudy Nebres Alex Niño Sonny Trinidad Bob Wiacek Tony DeZuniga Jim Mooney Bob McLeod (vol. 2) Dan Green
- Colorist: List: (vol. 2) Tom Smith
- Editor: List: (vol. 1) David Anthony Kraft Rick Marschall (vol. 2) Jaye Gardner Josh Roberts

Collected editions
- Essential Rampaging Hulk Vol. 1: ISBN 0-7851-2699-6
- Essential Rampaging Hulk Vol. 2: ISBN 0-7851-4255-X

The Rampaging Hulk is a comic book series published by Marvel Comics. The first volume was a black and white magazine published by Curtis Magazines (an imprint of Marvel) from 1977–1978. With issue #10, it changed its format to color and its title to The Hulk!, and ran another 17 issues before it was canceled in 1981. It was a rare attempt by Marvel to mix their superhero characters with the "mature readers" black-and-white magazine format.

With the change to color and the title to The Hulk!, the magazine became Marvel's attempt to cash in on the popularity of The Incredible Hulk TV series, starring Bill Bixby and Lou Ferrigno, both of whom were prominently featured and interviewed over the course of the magazine's run, as was executive producer Kenneth Johnson.

The series had a second run of six issues from August 1998 to January 1999.

== Publication history ==
The Rampaging Hulk ran for nine issues from January 1977 to June 1978. With issue #10 (Aug. 1978), the bi-monthly magazine changed its title to The Hulk! and became a full-color book utilizing "Marvelcolor".

The magazine featured fully painted covers by such artists as Ken Barr, Earl Norem, and Joe Jusko. Norem's work on the series included a darkly-lit close-up of the Hulk's face, looking angry and gritting his teeth with one of his fists raised, done for The Hulk! #17 (Oct. 1979).

Artists such as Walt Simonson, John Buscema, Howard Chaykin, John Romita Sr., John Romita Jr. (doing some of his first professional work), Keith Pollard, Jim Starlin, Joe Jusko, Bill Sienkiewicz, Val Mayerik, Herb Trimpe, Brent Anderson, and Gene Colan provided interior artwork; while writers such as Starlin, Doug Moench, Roger Stern, Dennis O'Neil, and Archie Goodwin took on the scripting chores. The coloring of the color issues was done by Steve Oliff, using a system developed by Rick Marschall for the magazine.

Through its run, the magazine published backup features starring Ulysses Bloodstone (issues #1–6 and 8) the Man-Thing (issue #7) and Shanna the She-Devil (issue #9). The Moon Knight was featured in issues #11–15, #17–18, and #20, featuring some of Bill Sienkiewicz's early work starting in #13, when his style was similar to that of Neal Adams.

The story "A Very Personal Hell" in issue #23 (Oct. 1980) has been criticized for its depiction of an attempted rape of Bruce Banner and the use of anti-gay stereotypes.

With issue #24, the magazine returned to black-and-white, though it published the last Dominic Fortune backup story in full color. It was canceled with issue #27 (June 1981).

A six-issue comic book series in color, also titled The Rampaging Hulk, was published from August 1998 to January 1999 by Marvel. Most of the stories were written by Glenn Greenberg with art by Rick Leonardi and Dan Green.

== Editorial direction ==
The stories in The Rampaging Hulk were set between the end of his original, short-lived solo title and the beginning of his feature in Tales to Astonish. A problem with this was pointed out by fans in the letter columns. Despite the stories being placed in the past, they depicted the Hulk's character as he was contemporaneously, e.g. speaking in his "Hulk smash!" pidgin English, changing to and from Bruce Banner based on his emotions, and wearing tattered purple trousers; whereas in the claimed time frame, he should have spoken fluent, if gangsterish, English, transformed via a gamma ray machine, and wore neat purple trunks.

With its re-titling to The Hulk!, the series turned to using stories set contemporaneously with the majority of Marvel publications (including its sister title The Incredible Hulk). It also adopted the same formula of the popular Incredible Hulk TV series: human interest-driven, with no supporting cast, no supervillains, and no guest stars.

Although The Rampaging Hulk / The Hulk! was intended to feature stand-alone stories, some characters (such as the extraterrestrial Bereet) crossed over into the Incredible Hulk title. Bereet appeared in issue #269 (March 1982) of the regular series to explain away the Rampaging Hulk series as fictions she created for the entertainment of her homeworld's residents. This changed the Rampaging Hulk stories into metafiction.

Other Marvel mainstays also appeared, with the X-Men making an appearance in issue #2 and the Avengers in issue #9.

== Collected editions ==
- Essential Rampaging Hulk
  - Volume 1 collects the Hulk stories from The Rampaging Hulk #1–9, The Hulk! #10–15, and The Incredible Hulk #269, 584 pages, June 2008, ISBN 978-0785126997
  - Volume 2 collects the Hulk stories from The Hulk! #16–27, 544 pages, April 2010, ISBN 978-0785142553
