= John Warner (comics) =

American comic book writer and editor (born 1952)

- Born: John David Warner; December 3, 1952 (age 73)
- Areas: Writer, Editor
- Pseudonyms: John David; John Dell Jenkins
- Notable works: Dark Shadows; Son of Satan

John Warner (born December 3, 1952) is an American comic book writer and editor, known for his stories of horror and the supernatural. He lists as his influences Arthur Rackham, N.C. Wyeth, Gerry Anderson, Maxfield Parrish, Chuck Jones, Jay Ward, Ray Bradbury, and Jorge Luis Borges.

Warner's most prolific period in the comic book field was from 1973 to 1979. During that time, he wrote many issues of Gold Key Comics' Dark Shadows, as well as assorted fill-ins for Marvel Comics, DC Comics, and Warren Publishing.

== Biography ==
From 1975 to 1978, Warner served as an editor and writer for Marvel's line of black-and-white magazines, where he worked primarily on Deadly Hands of Kung Fu, but also on Doc Savage, Marvel Preview, and Rampaging Hulk. For the latter series he created the characters Killer Shrike and the Modular Man. Separately, he co-created Ulysses Bloodstone. During his stint as a Marvel/Curtis editor, Warner hired Ralph Macchio, who later went on to a long-running career at Marvel.

In addition, Warner wrote most of the run of Marvel's Son of Satan, and in the late 1970s wrote Gold Key's Flash Gordon comic.

== Notes ==
Preceded by Arnold Drake	Dark Shadows writer 1973–1976	Succeeded by N/A
Preceded by Steve Englehart	Captain America writer 1975	Succeeded by Tony Isabella & Frank Robbins
Preceded by Steve Gerber	Son of Satan writer 1975–1976	Succeeded by Bill Mantlo
Preceded by Raymond Marais	Flash Gordon writer 1978–1979	Succeeded by Gary Poole
