= Mercury (comics) =

Mercury, in comics, may refer to:

- Mercury (Marvel Comics), a.k.a. Cessily Kincaid, a Marvel Comics character
- Mercury (Amalgam Comics), a combination of the characters Impulse and Quicksilver made for Amalgam Comics
- Hermes (Marvel Comics), an Olympian god known to the Romans as Mercury in Marvel Comics
- Makkari (character), a Marvel Comics character who once used the name "Mercury" when operating as a crime fighter
- Max Mercury, a DC Comics superhero
- Mercury, a member of the Metal Men, DC comics characters made of elements from the periodic table
- Mercury, a member of Cerebro's X-Men

== See also ==
- Mercury (disambiguation)
- Hermes (comics), as Hermes is the Roman name for the same (or a similar) god
