= Prometheus (Marvel Comics) =

Prometheus is the name of two characters appearing in American comic books published by Marvel Comics. The first one is based on the Greek Titan of the same name while the second one is a member of the Pantheon.

== Publication history ==
The mythological Prometheus first appeared in The Avengers #282 and was adapted by Roger Stern and John Buscema.

The Pantheon version of Prometheus first appeared in The Incredible Hulk #368 and was created by Peter David.

== Fictional character biography ==
=== Prometheus (Olympian) ===
Prometheus

Publication information
- Publisher: Marvel Comics
- First appearance: The Avengers #282 (August 1987)
- Created by: Roger Stern; John Buscema

In-story information
- Team affiliations: Olympians
- Abilities: Superhuman strength Healing factor Precognition

Prometheus is one of the Titans of Greek mythology and the son of Iapetus. His siblings included Atlas, Menoetius, and Epimetheus. When their uncle Cronus' rule is challenged by Zeus, Prometheus and Epimetheus side with the Olympians while Atlas and Menoetius side with Cronus. With the help of Prometheus and Epimetheus, the Olympians defeat the Titans. Prometheus and Epimetheus take an interest in mankind and become the joint rulers in Phthia. Prometheus later learns various skills from Athena that concern Zeus. After Prometheus takes fire from the gods and gifts it to humanity, Zeus has Kratos and Bia bind Prometheus to a pillar in the Caucasian Mountains using chains forged by Hephaestus. Zeus also has an eagle peck out Prometheus' liver which grows back every night. Zeus offers to shorten Prometheus' sentence if Prometheus gives him information concerning a prophecy that foretells Zeus being overthrown. Seven generations later, Hercules frees Prometheus during his 12 Labours. Zeus is at first against this, but decides to end Prometheus' punishment.

In the modern era, Hercules is injured during a fight with Helmut Zemo's Masters of Evil when Black Mamba drugs Hercules, causing him to charge into battle. After Namor is abducted by Neptune and brought to the Underworld, he manages to escape and is healed by Prometheus. Prometheus directs Namor to Fortress Tartarus, where the other Avengers are being held. The Avengers make their way to Mount Olympus, where Prometheus speaks to them while they are in the woods. Zeus catches up to the Avengers while Doctor Druid heals Hercules' mind.

=== Prometheus (Pantheon) ===
Prometheus

Publication information
- Publisher: Marvel Comics
- First appearance: The Incredible Hulk #368 (April 1990)
- Created by: Peter David

In-story information
- Team affiliations: Pantheon
- Abilities: Immortality; Skilled tracker

Prometheus is a member of the Pantheon, a group made up of Agamemnon's descendants. Prometheus is born with a burned and deformed face, and drives the Argo, a high-tech vehicle created by the Pantheon's engineers. He is regarded an excellent tracker, particularly over interstellar distances.

== Powers and abilities ==
The Olympian version of Prometheus has super-strength, a healing factor, and precognition.

The Pantheon Prometheus has expert tracking skills. Like the other Pantheon members, Prometheus possesses a healing factor.
