= Hermes (comics) =

Hermes, in comics, may refer to:

- Hermes (Marvel Comics), a Marvel Comics character
- Hermes (DC Comics), a DC Comics character connected to Captain Marvel

== See also ==
- Hermes (disambiguation)
- Mercury (comics), as Mercury is the Roman name for the same god
