= Delphi (comics) =

Delphi is the name of two different characters in Marvel Comics:

- Delphi (Morlocks), a Marvel Comics character appearing in the Uncanny X-Men series
- Delphi (Pantheon), a Marvel Comics character appearing in the Incredible Hulk series
