= Hercules (Marvel Comics) =

Marvel Comics fictional character

- Hercules taken from the variant cover of The Incredible Hercules #133 (August 2009). Art by Salva Espin.

Publication information
- Publisher: Marvel Comics
- First appearance: (in shadow) U.S.A. Comics #7 (March 1943) (Golden Age) Young Allies #16 (May 1945) (Silver Age) Journey into Mystery Annual #1 (October 1965)
- Created by: Stan Lee (writer); Jack Kirby (artist)

In-story information
- Full name: Hercules Panhellenios (born Alcaeus, later changed to Heracles)
- Species: Olympian
- Team affiliations: Olympians; Argonauts; Avengers; Champions; Damage Control; Defenders; Heroes for Hire; S.H.I.E.L.D. God Squad; Renegades; Guardians of the Galaxy
- Partnerships: Amadeus Cho
- Notable aliases: The Prince of Power; The Lion of Olympus; Victor Tegler; Harry Cleese; Agent 125
- Abilities: Superhuman agility, durability, endurance, stamina, strength, and reflexes; Regenerative healing factor; Invulnerability; Immortality

Hercules Panhellenios is a character appearing in American comic books published by Marvel Comics. Debuting in the Silver Age of Comic Books, the character is based on Heracles of Greek mythology (despite using the name of his Roman equivalent, Hercules). Since his first appearance, he has been a perennial member of the superhero team the Avengers.

The character has appeared in various forms of media, including television series and video games. Brett Goldstein portrays the character in the Marvel Cinematic Universe film Thor: Love and Thunder (2022).

== Publication history ==
While several characters named Hercules appeared in Golden Age Marvel Comics, (Note: who were dubbed as such because of their great strength, but otherwise unrelated, e.g. Little Hercules in Daring Mystery Comics #6 (June 1940), Varen David aka Hercules in Mystic Comics #3 (also June 1940)) the mythological figure first appeared in U.S.A. Comics #7 (March 1943), in which he appeared in shadow behind a window to give a suit of power to Martin Burns, who became Marvel Boy. (Note: A previous version of this character had appeared, done by Joe Simon and Jack Kirby, as the reincarnation of Hercules, again in Daring Mystery Comics #6, June 1940. Despite both being named Martin Burns, The Official Handbook of the Marvel Universe considers them two separate characters despite having the same civilian name.) Two issues prior, in U.S.A. Comics #5, Menalaos had similarly given powers to Lon Craig as Roko the Amazing. In Young Allies #16 (May 1945), Tommy Tyme traveled to Hercules's time and witnessed his battle with Antaeus.

Marvel's modern version of Hercules was adapted from the Greek god Heracles by writer Stan Lee and artist Jack Kirby. The character debuted in The Avengers #10 (November 1964) as a minion of Immortus, although that appearance was revealed to be an impostor in the limited series Avengers Forever (December 1998–November 1999). The character's first formal appearance in the Marvel Universe became Journey into Mystery Annual #1 (October 1965), which established Hercules as being a rival of the Norse god of thunder, Thor.

Hercules became a regular guest star in the title The Mighty Thor, appearing in issue #126 (March 1966). The character guest-starred in Tales to Astonish #79 (May 1966), and his deadlocked battle with the Hulk, as told by Lee, Kirby, and Bill Everett, has come to be regarded as a classic. The tale parallels Hercules and the Hulk's titanic strength, short temper, and simple-mindedness, while contrasting their lot in life: Hercules being a beloved hero and pampered celebrity, while the Hulk is a hated and feared fugitive. The character teamed up with the Avengers in issue #38 (March 1967), but was not yet an official member; he was merely a guest of the Avengers during his banishment from Olympus. In issue #45 of The Avengers, Hercules became a "full-fledged Avenger" by way of Goliath's announcement to the press during the first annual "Avengers Day". Hercules also guest starred in Marvel Team-Up #28 (December 1974) and Marvel Premiere #26 (November 1975) before starring along with four other heroes in The Champions which ran for 17 issues (October 1975–January 1978). After this, Hercules made a guest appearance in Marvel Two-In-One #44 (October 1978).

Hercules starred in two limited series by writer-artist Bob Layton, with both set in an alternate universe. A 24th century version of Hercules starred in Hercules, Prince of Power #1–4 (September–December 1982), which was popular enough to spawn a sequel, Hercules, Prince of Power #1–4 (March–June 1984). The storylines dealt with Hercules's exile from Olympus, completion of a series of quests and opportunity to leave his past behind and create a new identity.

Hercules remained a constant guest star in both Thor and The Avengers, playing a significant role in the "Avengers Under Siege" storyline in The Avengers #270–277 (August 1986–March 1987), involving supervillain team the Masters of Evil. The story lead directly into the "Assault on Olympus" storyline in The Avengers #281–285 (July 1987–November 1987), in which Hercules left the team.

The character starred in the self-titled limited series Hercules vol. 3, #1–5 (June–Sep. 2005), and guest starred in the limited series Thor: Blood Oath #1–6 (Nov. 2005-Feb. 2006), a retrospective story that depicts the second meeting between the Hercules and Thor.

At the conclusion of the "World War Hulk" storyline, Hercules received a self-titled publication when Marvel changed the name of the third volume of the Incredible Hulk series to The Incredible Hercules, effective as of issue #113 (Feb. 2008), and written by Greg Pak and Fred Van Lente. The series concluded with The Incredible Hercules #141 (April 2010), and was followed by the 2-issue mini-series Hercules: Fall of an Avenger (March–April 2010). The mini-series is scheduled to lead into the relaunched new title, Prince of Power #1 (May 2010), also written by Pak and Van Lente.

Writers Greg Pak and Fred Van Lente started a brand new Hercules series, entitled Herc, featuring the hero without powers, but wielding mythical arms.

Marvel Comics continuity has been retconned so that the character Hercules, introduced in Young Allies #16 ("Battle of the Giants" by artist Charles Nicholas; summer 1945), was incorporated in the version of Hercules introduced in 1966.

== Fictional character biography ==
=== 1960s ===
Hercules first appears when pulled from the past by the villain Immortus to battle Thor. This story is not referenced in the character's next appearance, which depicts Hercules and Thor as apparently meeting for the first time. The discrepancy is eventually explained when it is revealed by retcon that the first "Hercules" encountered was actually a Space Phantom in disguise.

Hercules guest-stars in an extended Thor storyline, defeating Thor (punished by Odin for loving the mortal woman Jane Foster). Hercules unwittingly becomes the slave of fellow Olympian god Pluto when he signs a contract which he thinks is for a film, but actually states that he will now rule the Netherworld instead of Pluto. Hercules is eventually rescued by Thor (now at full strength) who battles and defeats Pluto's underworld minions. Pluto opts to void the contract rather than accept the destruction of his realm. While under the contract, Hercules has a chance encounter with the Hulk, fighting him to a standstill.

Hercules reappears as the thrall of the Asgardian villainess Enchantress who is using water from the spring of Eros and tries to use him to destroy the Avengers. After being freed from the spell and being banished from Olympus for one year by Zeus for going to Earth without permission, Hercules aids the team for an extended period before leaving for Olympus. Hercules returns briefly during a storyline set directly after the Kree-Skrull War, in which the Avengers witness an amnesiac Hercules being abducted by two Titans. After dealing with a disruption in New York City caused by Ares, the Avengers travel to Olympus and free Hercules and the Olympian gods, who have been turned to crystal by Ares using the Ebony Blade. The Avengers learn that Hercules had lost his memory after being thrown from Olympus.

=== 1970s ===
Hercules becomes a founding member of the Champions, aiding the group against the machinations of Olympians Pluto and Hippolyta. Hercules appears during the Korvac saga, and after being kidnapped by the Collector is freed (with the other Avengers) by comrade Hawkeye to battle the cosmic entity Korvac.

=== 1980s ===
Hercules reappears during the "Celestial saga", joining an invasion force comprising Olympian gods and other allies that storms the realm of Olympia (occupied by the Eternals). Following these events, Hercules rejoins the Avengers.

In the storyline "Avengers Under Siege", Helmut Zemo assembles an army of supervillains to form the Masters of Evil. Courtesy of a paid pawn, Hercules is drugged at a bar in order to incapacitate him. Hercules returns to Avengers Mansion and singlehandedly engages the Masters of Evil until he is beaten unconscious by Goliath, Mister Hyde, and the Wrecking Crew. Although the Masters of Evil are defeated, Hercules is left comatose. In the subsequent storyline "Assault On Olympus", Hercules is taken from the hospital by fellow Olympian Hermes and returned to Olympus by Hermes. The Avengers discover they are being blamed by Zeus for Hercules's condition. As the Avengers battle several of the gods and Zeus himself, Prometheus restores Hercules to full health using part of his life force. Zeus learns that the Avengers are not to blame, but decides to ban the Olympians from Earth.

=== 1990s ===
Together with Thor, Hercules confronts the Wrecking Crew once again, and recovers his confidence and defeats the villains when Thor feigns defeat. After a brief appearance in the "Black Galaxy" saga, Hercules rejoins the Avengers as a reserve member and is upgraded to active status during the "Collection Obsession" storyline.

Hercules is summoned to Avengers Mansion along with all other active Avengers. They learn that the United Nations has forbidden them from interfering with a civil war in Genosha. The heroes are confronted by an army of S.H.I.E.L.D. agents, who attempt to confine them to the mansion. Hercules throws a massive piece of debris at the Helicarrier, clearing a path for some of the other heroes to escape. He and the remaining Avengers storm into an emergency session of the United Nations Security Council where they demand to take an active role in ending the conflict.

When Hercules falls in love with a mortal woman called Taylor Madison, the goddess Hera intervenes and attempts to kill her, although this is prevented when Ares warns Zeus. Hercules discovers that Madison was actually a construct created by Zeus to lure out Hera, and attacks his father. Zeus is angered by "his son's lack of respect", and strips Hercules of his immortality and half his strength, forbidding him from returning to Olympus.

=== 2000s ===
Hercules becomes a drunkard, dismayed at the dissolution of the Avengers during the "Disassembled" storyline, and the destruction of Asgard and disappearance of Thor. Hera takes advantage of Hercules's vulnerability and via her pawn Eurystheus (an ancient rival of Hercules during the Twelve Labors) proposes he complete a modern version of the classic Labors for a reality television show. Despite opposition from villains such as the Abomination, the organization Hydra, and awkward tasks such as retrieving the shield of Captain America, Hercules is successful. Hercules is also forgiven by former wife Megara, who Hercules accidentally killed.

Hercules encounters Thor for the second time in a retrospective story; and guest stars in a humorous story with heroine She-Hulk, Hercules being successfully sued by the villain Constrictor for injuring him. Hercules also aids fellow Greek god Ares against the Japanese gods when they attempt to overrun Olympus. Hercules eventually wins back his lost fortune in a poker match with Constrictor.

After the conclusion of "World War Hulk", Hercules embarks on series of adventures with Amadeus Cho, a teenage genius and "sidekick". Hercules encounters long-time foe Ares, who poisons the hero with venom from the mythical Hydra. After being driven mad by the venom and embarking on a destructive rampage, Hercules is eventually stopped by former Champions teammate Black Widow (who also neutralizes Cho when he attacks spy organization S.H.I.E.L.D.).

Hercules plays a pivotal role in the "Secret Invasion" storyline, forming a team called the God Squad (consisting of Ajak, Amatsu-Mikaboshi, Demogorge, and Snowbird) to neutralize the Skrull gods directing the invasion of Earth. Hercules is made leader of the team, as the representative of the Western Gods. When Nightmare asks for the team's fears as they try to get his help to get to the Skrull gods, he sees Hercules's fear from losing his armor bearer Hylas. Hercules and Snowbird form a romantic attachment, and together slay Kly'bn, the leader of the Skrull pantheon, by impaling him with Atum's spine (with Amatsu-Mikaboshi assuming this role and ending the intervention by Skrull divinity). This event is immediately followed by the storyline "Love and War", in which Hercules, Amadeus Cho, Namora, and Athena attempt to thwart Amazon leader Artume. Hera and Pluto take advantage of the chaos and an absent Zeus to attempt to kill Hercules and Athena. Hercules helps Cho's lover - Delphyne - kill Artume and take her place as queen.

=== 2010s ===
Hercules teams with both the Mighty and New Avengers to stop Hera from remaking the universe with a device called Continuum. Hercules battles Typhon in the alternate Continuum universe and defeats him. Athena appears after the fight, but instead of coming to help she seemingly destroys the Continuum universe with Hercules still inside. She explains that he had to die so that Amadeus Cho could replace him as the new "Prince of Power". A funeral service is held at the Parthenon in Athens, where many of Hercules's comrades pay their respects and share memories. Athena appoints Cho as the leader of the Olympus Group. Cho travels to Hades, only to discover that Hercules is, in fact, not dead. Cho tells Athena he intends to use all their resources to find Hercules and bring him back. Cho teams with Bruce Banner to build a machine that can scan all of reality, but discovers it would take over a billion years to locate Hercules. Cho then embarks on a quest to gain the power of a god, competing against Vali Halfling and the Pantheon and teaming up with Thor. Once Cho becomes a god and attains omniscience, he realizes that he is inadequate to wield such power. First he returns Hercules to Earth, then transfers all his new powers into him.

During the events of the 2010 "Chaos War" storyline, Amatsu-Mikaboshi arrives on Earth with an army of slave gods, destroying the dream dimension and causing people all over the world to enter a sleep-coma. He then destroys the afterlives of all the cultures of the world, freeing the dead to walk the Earth. Hercules assembles a second God Squad to battle Amatsu-Mikaboshi, who now calls himself the Chaos King. The combined efforts of the God Squad, Alpha Flight, Hulk's allies, and deceased members of the Avengers and X-Men manage to keep the Chaos King's armies at bay, while Cho and Galactus work on a way to transport the entire Earth into the safety of the Continuum universe. Hercules is able to seal off the Chaos King in the Continuum, saving the world. Hercules then uses up all of his power in order to restore the universe, leaving him mortal once again.

Hercules reappears in Brooklyn, armed with an array of Olympian weapons stolen from the armory of his deceased brother Ares. They include a magic sword called the Sword of Peleus, the Shield of Perseus (an unbreakable shield that turns anyone who looks at it to stone), arrows that can penetrate through anything, and the Helm of Hades (a helmet of invisibility). He gets a job bartending at a Greek run bar and restaurant in Brooklyn. He later battles Hobgoblin in a construction site, who was attempting to intimidate the owner of the restaurant into selling it to the Kingpin. After defeating him, Hercules discovers that the owner's daughter sold him out to Hobgoblin and confronts her, until Kingpin appears and tells the owner he can keep the restaurant, taking Hobgoblin with him. After his victory becomes public, the restaurant becomes successful and Hercules becomes a local hero and celebrity.

In the storyline "Fear Itself", Hecate works with Kyknos (the son of Ares) to take over the city. The pair manage to turn some people against Hercules due to the chaos that the Serpent's Worthy created. Griffin has an unexpected reaction to the magic forces at work, causing him to devolve into a bestial form. Griffin saves Hercules's life and becomes his steed, allowing him to fly around the city. Hercules recovers upon hearing the prayers of his worshipers and finds himself in Griffin's care, only to discover that Brooklyn has been reshaped into a nightmarish landscape. Hercules saves the villains by killing Kyknos, then prevents Ares from being resurrected by kicking over his altar. Hecate flees and Brooklyn is returned to normal.

During the 2011 "Spider-Island" storyline, the Greek owners/operators of the bar where Hercules works have fled the dangers of New York City and returned to Greece, leaving Hercules in charge. He befriends an elderly African man named A. Nancy who loves stories. One night Herc is bitten by a bed bug that gives him spider powers, which he uses to fight crime. The Queen of Spider Island reveals herself to Herc and makes him her slave. She sends Spider-Herc against the X-Men, who were in town after fighting lizard people in the sewers. They try to reason with him, but he attacks them with the Sword of Peleus. Due to the mutagenic properties of Spider-Man's powers, Hercules mutates into a spider-like form. Shortly after, the X-Men are trapped in a magic web, and the Greek goddess Arachne appears. Instead of fighting, it is revealed that Arachne is attracted to Hercules's new form and they embrace, while the X-Men are forced to watch. While Arachne is preoccupied, A. Nancy breaks into her home and steals her mythical woven tapestry. He reveals himself as the African spider god Anansi, a collector of stories, when he's attacked by Elektra, who takes the tapestry from him. Hercules is later cured of his spider transformation by Spider-Man, along with everyone else infected.

Hercules later encounters Zeus, who was depowered by his wife Hera because of his infidelity and womanizing. During that time, he discovers Elektra stealing a museum artifact from the Hand. After battling the Hand ninjas, Hercules discovers, through Kingpin, that Elektra is stealing mystical artifacts for Baba Yaga, a Slavic witch who was summoned by the Russian mob, who plans to absorb the magic of the artifacts to gain a youthful appearance and increase her power. He manages to locate Baba Yaga after Elektra steals his weapons. Herc and Zeus infiltrate the witch's home and Herc, with Elektra's help, defeats Baba Yaga. He then lets Zeus absorb the magic from the artifacts, restoring his godly powers, and they part ways.

Hercules is called upon to act as a guest instructor at Avengers Academy when most of the main faculty are preoccupied with the events of the 2012 "Avengers vs. X-Men." The school is suddenly visited by Captain America, who asks that the facility be used to hold the younger members of the X-Men until the fighting is over. Kavita Rao and Madison Jeffries urge their students to comply with the Avengers, but many are resentful of the confinement. Hercules arranges an Olympic competition between the two schools in order to ease tensions and avoid an actual fight from taking place. Sebastian Shaw (who was also being held at the academy) escapes and the faculty members of both schools try to keep him from reaching the students. Hercules is defeated because Shaw is able to absorb the magic energy from his weapons. Shaw then tells the X-Men students to escape before fleeing himself. Hercules urges Tigra to let the kids join the fight if they want to, believing they had no right to hold them against their will in the first place. Some of the X-Men students remain at Avengers Academy while many join the fighting, and Hercules reflects that while the older generation has only found war, at least some of the kids were able to find peace.

As part of the 2015 - 19 rebranding All-New, All-Different Marvel, Hercules, isolated and shunned by the hero community, attempts to regain his reputation as a true hero, by adapting himself into modern society. During that time, he takes on the threats of the Uprising Storm, a group of new gods consisting of Catastrophobia, god of war; Horrorscope; and Cryptomnesia, god of data, as they plan to wipe out the old gods.

During the 2016 "Civil War II" storyline, Hercules is seen at a bar talking to Amadeus Cho, who has become the new Hulk, when the city is suddenly under attack by a Celestial and both spring into action. During the battle, while Cho helps the other heroes, Hercules encounters the Uprising Storm, who tell him of their plan to destroy the world and turn him into one of them by teasing him into believing that the other heroes don't want him anymore. Back home, he confines his encounter to his friends and, after a pep talk from his landlady Sophia, decides to reunite the ancient heroes in order to battle the Uprising Storm. Upon gathering the ancient heroes, known as the Gods of War, Hercules informs them of the situation when the Uprising Storm suddenly show up. They begin to battle, with the Uprising Storm getting the upper hand. In the middle of the fight, Hercules begins to destroy the city when Cryptomnesia uses the brand he placed on him to turn him into a God of Chaos, forcing the others to fight him while the Uprising Storm watch. During the battle, Hercules is confronted by Steve Rogers, Captain Marvel, Spider-Man and Medusa who attempt to stop his rampage. After a brief fight, the Gods of War inform the heroes of the Storm and the curse placed on Hercules, though they do not see them. Steve and Gilgamesh then go to free Hercules from the curse. After the brand disappears and the other heroes leave, Hercules informs his friends about the Storm's true intentions, total destruction, and that they must be stopped. Later, while Hercules, Sigurd, Gilgamesh, Beowulf and Theseus ambush the Storm in their hideout, an abandoned hotel, Ire, Lorelei and Tiresias perform a ritual to weaken the Storm. Initially, the ritual has no effect until Horrorscope is defeated and killed by Ire and Lorelei, when she teleported to the apartment to kill them, while Catastrophobia and Cryptomnesia are killed by Gilgamesh and Hercules respectively. After killing Cryptomnesia, Hercules is congratulated by Athena, who offers him a place in Olympus. Hercules turns it down so that he can continue to live on Earth as a true hero.

In the aftermath of "Civil War II", Hercules rejoins the Avengers, where they foil an ambush by Kang the Conqueror. While the others are trapped in limbo as a result of time paradoxes created by Kang, Hercules (immune to Kang's current tactics of targeting the infant Avengers as nobody knows exactly where or when he was born) goes to Vietnam, where he fights two versions of Kang attacking a temple who were looking for an infant version of Kang. After Hercules finds the child, the Avengers return from limbo and start fighting until Vision sends Wasp back in time to return baby Kang to his era. After Wasp succeeds, the Avengers make a plan to defeat Kang for good. They assemble the original Avengers from the past and join forces to attack Kang's alternate versions at the same time. After defeating Kang, each of the Avengers return to their timelines. The Avengers are then recruited by a reformed Doctor Doom operating as Iron Man to defeat a coven of young witches. They later battle Avenger X, a member of the original New Avengers, who attempted to eliminate the team until Wasp shrinks her to sub-atomic levels.

During the 2017 "Secret Empire" storyline, Hercules appears as a member of the Underground following Hydra's conquest of the United States. Hercules and Quicksilver lead a strike force to find the Cosmic Cube fragments so that they can use it to restore Captain America to normal. After convincing Sam Wilson to smuggle them out of the country, the team goes to locate a Cosmic Cube fragment which is in possession of Ultron. Upon arriving, they encounter Hydra's Avengers led by Steve Rogers and are captured by Ultron. They later manage to escape while Ultron gives the team his fragment. During a mission in Madripoor, Hercules is petrified by Gorgon, but later recovers.

After their hideout is destroyed, the heroes witness Sam Wilson reassuming the mantle of Captain America. With the use of the Cosmic Cube fragment, they manage to help destroy the Planetary Defense Shield and the Darkforce dome over Manhattan and liberate all the imprisoned Inhumans. While attacking Hydra forces at the United States Capitol, the Underground are surprised by Steve Rogers, who was wearing a Cosmic Cube-powered armor. They later witness the final battle between the Hydra Steve Rogers and the real Steve Rogers and the restoration of America.

When the Human Torch starts losing his powers he asks Hercules for advice on how to restore them. Hercules had recently found a way to get his own powers back after losing them fighting the Chaos King. Johnny and the Thing find him at a bar in Brooklyn drinking non-alcoholic beer. He tells them about how he was healed by a scientist named Rachna Koul. He takes them to her secret lab, where she explains that she was able to repair the biological conduit connecting Hercules to the source of his godly power.

During the events of the 2018 "Avengers: No Surrender" storyline, Hercules is sent to the Roman Colosseum with Rogue‘s team of Avengers to battle the Lethal Legion. The team then traveled to Antarctica to fight against the Black Order. Later Hercules, and his teammates attempt to stop the Hulk from rampaging through Avengers HQ. Hercules and Sunspot use their combined strength to stabilize the "world-engine" that is protecting the Earth while Thor and Lightning recharge it. Herc, Thor, and Wonder Man travel to Asgard to celebrate their victory.

As a result of the "No Surrender" storyline, the primordial Greek goddess Nyx escapes her centuries-long confinement and murders most of the Greek Pantheon. Hercules and the Avengers fought to prevent Nyx from fully reclaiming her soul. Nyx's minions were defeated and she was ultimately killed by the Vision.

=== 2020s ===
When Hercules tried to track down his resurrected family, he instead was captured by them. He was freed by the reformed Guardians of the Galaxy. He aided the Guardians in stopping the mad gods, but at the cost of Star-Lord's life. Following the battle with Gamora's West Spiral Arm Guardians, Hercules began a relationship with Noh-Varr.

During the 2024 "Blood Hunt" storyline, Hercules is among the superheroes who join Captain America's branch of the Avengers when fighting the vampire invasion. Following the events of "Blood Hunt", Hercules joins the AVENG.E.R.S. (Avengers Emergency Response Squad).

== Powers and abilities ==
Hercules possesses the typical powers of an Olympian god, including superhuman strength, durability, speed, reflexes, stamina and endurance. He is the strongest of the Olympians, being capable of feats such as lifting and hurling a giant sequoia tree, smashing rocks to powder, sealing an entire cliff around an opponent with his bare hands, and knocking out a yellow-crested Titan. His superstrong legs allow him to run at speeds of over 100 mph, and leap over a hundred feet into the air. He can withstand blows from Thor, and possesses a complete resistance to high caliber bullets. He is able to recover from injuries with superhuman speed and efficiency.

Hercules is highly skilled in archery, boxing, Greco-Roman wrestling, and claims to have invented the martial art Pankration. In combat, he occasionally wields a golden-looking adamantine mace – stated and shown to be equal in durability to Thor's hammer Mjolnir (though it is not enchanted with additional abilities as Mjolnir is) - forged by the Greek god Hephaestus. As an Olympian, he is resistant to all earthly diseases, possesses a healing factor, immortality, and also has some immunity to magic. However, his strength can be taken by significant Olympian magic, such as that of Zeus.

Hercules sacrificed his godly powers to save humanity in the wake of the Chaos War, and was completely powerless. Despite this, he retained his exceptional physical condition compared to a normal human, incredible skills in archery and hand-to-hand combat and access to magical weapons and items that help in battle. At the start of the 2015 Hercules series, his powers made an unexplained return. They were later revealed to have been restored through scientific means. At this time, Hercules made use of both antique and modern weapons, such as assault rifles, tasers, grenade launchers, and others.

== Reception ==
=== Critical reception ===
Joe George of Den of Geek stated, "Hercules morphed into a lovable lunkhead and, eventually, a complex character whose good-natured love of adventure made him a valuable ally to heroes across the Marvel Universe. [...] Hercules became less an arrogant lout looking for fights and more a hero whose joi de vivre drove him toward adventure. When writer Al Ewing added Herc to his lineup of The Guardians of the Galaxy, he added a softer side to the character, as evidenced by his tender romance with hot-headed Kree warrior Noh-Varr. None of these writers changed the fundamental aspects of Hercules. He's still far from the smartest guy in the room, and he still refuses to back down from a fight. But he's now become the jock you could never hate, the guy who always gets the boy or girl he wants (and Herc wants most boys and girls he encounters), but isn't a jerk about it. He's the muscle-bound beefcake who always has your back and wants to lift your spirits."

=== Volumes ===
==== Herc - 2011 ====
According to Diamond Comic Distributors, Herc #1 was the 40th best selling comic book in April 2011.

Greg McElhatton of CBR.com called Herc #1 "a good, standard superhero title," stating, "Herc #1 wasn't what I was expecting, but it was still a fun read. If you don't mind a more superhero-friendly take on the character (rather than the strangeness-and I say that with great affection and admiration-of "Incredible Hercules"), give it a whirl. If giving up the humor and co-star is too much for you, though? Well, you've been warned." Jesse Schedeen of IGN gave Her #1 a grade of 8 out of 10, asserting, "Neil Edwards delivers some solid visuals as well, which is good considering consistent pencils have long been a problem with Herc's books. Edwards continues to grow and improve as a storyteller. While his style still bears too much resemblance to Bryan Hitch's at times, there are far worse artists to emulate. And Scott Hanna's inks ensure Edwards panels are often more refined and neat than Hitch's these days. Edwards' only real flaw is that he fails to accurately capture the stylized new look of the villain that appears in the final pages. This isn't a bad start for the newest chapter in Hercules' career. But again, Van Lente and Pak do the hero a disservice by de-emphasizing the humor to the extent they have. Hopefully that will change as the series builds its cast and Herc's new status quo."

==== Incredible Hercules - 2008 ====
According to Diamond Comic Distributors, Incredible Hercules #113 was the 18th best selling comic book in January 2008. Incredible Hercules #113 was the 196th best selling comic book in 2008.

Jesse Schedeen of IGN gave Incredible Hercules #113 a grade of 9 out of 10, saying, "Almost as much a breakout star as his half-brother, Ares is finally getting the exposure he deserves with Incredible Hercules. I was ready for the God of War to explode onto the scene after Michael Avon Oeming's recent mini-series. Unfortunately, he didn't explode so much as limp his way into the ranks of Mighty Avengers. Pak and van Lente seem to have a better handle on the character, as he comes across as much more intelligent and brutal than the dim-witted jock seen in the Avengers books. At this point the only things keeping Incredible Hercules from ranking as the best book of the week are the unfortunately-timed Immortal Iron Fist and the slightly underwhelming pencils of Khoi Pham. I don't want to be too hard on Pham. This is some of the best work I've seen from the artist so far. Still, it doesn't quite measure up to what we're seeing in some of the other Aftersmash books. If only Ed McGuinness were drawing this series instead of Hulk. I think I'd be in comic book heaven."

==== Hercules - 2015 ====
According to Diamond Comic Distributors, Hercules #1 was the 49th best selling comic book in November 2015. Hercules #1 was the 475th best selling comic book in December 2015.

Levi Hunt of IGN gave Hercules #1 a grade of 7.8 out of 10, writing, "Hercules seems like a strange series to launch amidst so many Avengers and X-Men premiere issues. But don't let the hero's C-list status keep you away from this book in favor of those bigger hitters – Hercules is a fun and well written book that finds a few ways to stand out in the current tidal wave of “fun and light” comics. The first thing you'll notice about the issue is how strong the dialogue and conversation is, the issue is a bit wordy but absolutely flies by – Dan Abnett's use and pacing of language is exemplary. Abnett also finds clever ways to make Hercules relevant in this modern setting, while also not forgetting his roots. That mix of modern and ancient will be the hook going forward and it's a promising one. Finally is Luke Ross on the art, his contributions to the book aren't as praise-worthy as Abnett's, but he really does well with the character acting."

=== Accolades ===
- In 2012, IGN ranked Hercules 21st in their "Top 50 Avengers" list.
- In 2019, CBR.com ranked Hercules 4th in their "Marvel Comics: The 10 Most Powerful Olympians" list.
- In 2021, CBR.com ranked Hercules 6th in their "Marvel: 10 Most Powerful Olympians" list and in their "10 Bravest Gods In Marvel Comics" list.
- In 2021, Screen Rant included Hercules in their "10 LGBTQ+ Marvel Heroes That Should Join The MCU" list.
- In 2022, Sportskeeda ranked Hercules 1st in their "10 best Greek gods from Marvel comics" list.
- In 2022, Collider ranked Hercules 15th in their "19 Most Powerful Marvel Characters" list.
- In 2022, Screen Rant included Hercules in their "10 Most Powerful Olympian Gods In Marvel Comics" list and in their "10 Most Powerful Thor Villains, In The Movies & Comics" list.
- In 2022, CBR.com included Hercules in their "13 Most Powerful Marvel Demigods" list, in their "10 Greatest Avengers, Ranked By Experience" list, and in their "10 Most Muscular Heroes In Marvel Comics" list.

== Other Marvel characters named Hercules ==
- Varen David—In 1940, Timely Comics (Marvel's predecessor) published the adventures of a strongman called "Hercules" in Mystic Comics #3 & 4. In 2009, this character was profiled in Marvel's Marvel Mystery Handbook and identified as "Varen David".
- Unnamed member of the Order-A member of the Order codenamed "Hercules" first appeared in Civil War #7 (2007).

== Other versions ==
=== "Heroes Reborn" ===
In an alternate reality depicted in the 2021 "Heroes Reborn" miniseries, Hercules fought Power Princess, but was turned into a statue and kept outside her headquarters in the Statue of Liberty. In the present, a mysterious thunderstorm temporarily brings him back to life, but Power Princess subdues him and turns him back.

=== Marvel Zombies ===
A zombified version of Hercules appears in Marvel Zombies vs. The Army of Darkness. He and several zombies participate in an attack on Doctor Doom's castle to reach the humans inside.

In the prequel Marvel Zombies: Dead Days, Hercules was one of several heroes who survived the zombie plague. However, he is later killed by a zombified Hulk.

=== 24th Century Hercules ===
An alternate universe version of Hercules stars in a humorous limited self-titled series which depicts his adventures in the 24th century. Banished from Olympus by Zeus in order to learn humility, Hercules travels into deep space where he meets the Rigellians, who loan him Recorder #417. After having adventures on several planets, Hercules arrives in the Omacron star system, where he confronts the cosmic entity Galactus, who humbles him. Following this, Hercules saves the world Galactus intended to devour at the time.

In the sequel series, which took on a dark tone and takes place 41 years after the first series, Hercules and Recorder #417 meet and eventually befriend an alien Skrull called Skyppi. They later face a cosmic version of the hero Red Wolf and a villain devoted to the Titan Thanos who breaks into the tomb of Captain Marvel to steal his Nega-Bands. Hercules eventually returns to Olympus and proves to Zeus, who had gone insane and seemingly killed the other gods, he has learned humility by fighting him and sparing his life. However, Zeus reveals the gods now exist in another plane of existence and he is to join them. Before he leaves, Zeus advises Hercules to found his own dynasty now that he is free of his past.

Hercules, Recorder, and Skyppi later returned in an issue of the reprint series Marvel Tales, and the graphic novel Hercules, Prince of Power: Full Circle. In the latter, the trio are captured by Emperor Arimathes, a son born of a past romantic adventure Hercules had and never knew existed. After learning that Arimathes had been manipulated by his vengeful mother into becoming a cruel tyrant, Hercules vows to save his son. A three-part storyline in the anthology series Marvel Comics Presents served as an epilogue to the events of the graphic novel.

This version of Hercules last appeared in a third limited series, Hercules: Twilight of a God. Set 75 years after the events of the first limited series, Hercules' three grandchildren, a new Silver Surfer, and the Galactus Black Hole that threatens all life in the galaxy. The fates of Skyppi, Recorder #417 and Arimathes are revealed as Hercules sacrifices himself to stop the galactic threat's expansion and, in doing so, alters the destiny of both himself and Galactus.

=== MC2 ===
In the possible future MC2 imprint title A-Next, Hercules appears as one of the remaining original Avengers. He also had a son named Argo the Almighty, who aids the next generation of Avengers.

=== Maestro ===
When the Hulk initially found Dystopia, Hercules was in charge of the collection of human survivors, now calling himself "the Maestro". An encounter with Rick Jones confirmed for the Hulk that Hercules is now only interested in ruling humans and having sparring matches or sex. Although the Hulk expresses little interest in helping ordinary people for the sake of helping them after they caused the apocalypse, he infiltrates Alchemax's remains to create the Dogs of War to oppose Hercules's forces.

=== X-Treme X-Men ===
X-Treme X-Men vol. 2 #7 (2013) depicts an alternate version of Hercules who is in a same-sex relationship with Wolverine, the British Governor General of Canada. In issue #10, after Hercules revealed his relationship with Wolverine to Zeus, Zeus banished them to the pit of Tartarus as he sees himself as the only god allowed to consort with mortals. During "Age of Apocalypse", Nightcrawler accidentally releases evil beings that destroy anyone they touch, including Hercules.

=== Ultimate Marvel ===
In the Ultimate Marvel universe, Hercules appears as a member of Nick Fury's Howling Commandos.

== In other media ==
=== Television ===
- Hercules appears in the "Mighty Thor" segment of The Marvel Super Heroes, voiced by Len Birman.
- Hercules makes a non-speaking cameo appearance in the X-Men: The Animated Series episode "One Man's Worth".
- Hercules makes non-speaking cameo appearances in Fantastic Four.
- Hercules appears in The Super Hero Squad Show, voiced by Jess Harnell.
- Hercules appears in Hulk and the Agents of S.M.A.S.H., voiced by Townsend Coleman. This version has a history with the Hulk, has an ego, and causes more problems than he can solve.
- Hercules appears in the Avengers Assemble episode "The Incredible Herc", voiced by Matthew Mercer.

=== Film ===
Hercules appears in the mid-credits scene of Thor: Love and Thunder, portrayed by Brett Goldstein. After battling Thor and his team in Omnipotence City, Zeus tasks Hercules with hunting down and killing Thor.

=== Video games ===
- Hercules appears as an NPC and boss in Marvel: Ultimate Alliance 2, voiced by Sean Donnellan.
- Hercules appears in Marvel Super Hero Squad: The Infinity Gauntlet, voiced by Jess Harnell.
- Hercules appears as a playable character in Marvel Avengers Alliance.
- Hercules appears in Marvel Heroes, voiced by Travis Willingham.

== Collected editions ==
Title	Material collected	Published date	ISBN
Hercules: New Labors of Hercules	Hercules (vol.3) #1-5	November 2005	978-0785117520
Wolverine/Hercules: Myths, Monsters & Mutants	Wolverine/Hercules: Myths, Monsters & Mutants #1-4, material from Marvel Treasury Edition #26	August 2011	978-0785141105
Incredible Hercules: Against The World	Incredible Hulk #112, Incredible Hercules #113-115, Hulk Vs. Hercules: When Titans Collide	October 2008	978-0785125334
Incredible Hercules: Smash Of The Titans	Incredible Hulk #106-112, Incredible Hercules #113-115, Hulk Vs. Hercules: When Titans Collide	July 2009	978-0785139683
Incredible Hercules: Secret Invasion	Incredible Hercules #116-120	November 2008	978-0785133339
Incredible Hercules: Love And War	Incredible Hercules #121-125	June 2009	978-0785132462
Incredible Hercules: Sacred Invasion	Incredible Hercules #116-125	March 2010	978-0785142560
Incredible Hercules: Dark Reign	Incredible Hercules #126-131	October 2009	978-0785138303
Incredible Hercules: The Mighty Thorcules	Incredible Hercules #132-137	January 2010	978-0785138310
Incredible Hercules: The Complete Collection Vol. 1	Incredible Hulk #106-112, Incredible Hercules #113-120, Hulk Vs. Hercules: When Titans Collide, material from Giant-Size Hulk #1, Amazing Fantasy (vol. 2) #15, Incredible Hulk #100	August 2019	978-1302918668
Incredible Hercules: The Complete Collection Vol. 2	Incredible Hercules #121-137	March 2021	978-1302923488
Incredible Hercules: Assault On New Olympus	Incredible Hercules #138-142, Siege of Olympus Prologue	May 2010	978-0785145455
Incredible Hercules: The New Prince of Power	Heroic Age: Prince of Power #1-4, Hercules: Fall of an Avenger #1-2	November 2010	978-0785143703
Herc: The Complete Series by Greg Pak and Fred Van Lente	Herc #1-10, 6.1	June 2012	978-0785147237
Hercules: Still Going Strong	Hercules (vol. 4) #1-6	June 2016	978-1302900335
Civil War II: Gods of War	Civil War II: Gods of War #1-4, Journey Into Mystery Annual #1	November 2016	978-1302900342

=== 24th Century Hercules ===
Title	Material collected	Published date	ISBN
Hercules: Full Circle	Marvel Tales #197, Marvel Graphic Novel #37, Marvel Comics Presents #39-41, material from Marvel Age #4, 65	November 2009	978-0785139577
Hercules: Prince of Power	Hercules (vol.1) #1-4, Hercules (vol.2) #1-4	September 2009	978-0785139553
Hercules: Twilight of a God	Hercules: Twilight of a God #1-4	December 2010	978-0785135463
