= List of alien races in Marvel Comics =

This is a list of alien races that appear in Marvel Comics.

== Overview ==
There are countless different extraterrestrial races in Marvel Comics universe. The vast majority are humanoid in structure.

=== Galactic Council ===
The Galactic Council is the assembly of numerous leaders of different alien empires across the universe created to deal with different matters of the universe. Its current members include Kl'rt and Paibok, representatives of the Kree/Skrull alliance, Oracle-2 and Izzy Kane, representatives of the Shi'ar empire, Noh-Varr, representative of the Kree; Richard Rider, representative of the Nova Corps; Peter Quill, representative of the Spartax; Mentacle, representative of the Rigellians; Riitho, representative of the Intergalactic Empire of Wakanda; Zoralis Gupa and Orbis Stellaris, representatives of the Galactic Rim Collective; Peacebringer, representative of the Chitauri; and Empress Kuga of the Zn'rx.

==== In other media ====
The Galactic Council appears in Guardians of the Galaxy, consisting of J'son, Thor, Irani Rael, the Rigellian Grand Commissioner, and the Supreme Intelligence.

== Major races ==
A few alien species have had considerable "air time" in various Marvel Comics publications over the years, having a near-constant presence or major crossovers and storylines involving them. This includes:

=== Badoon ===
The Badoon are reptilian aliens that are notable for living under strict gender segregation, resulting in two separate societies: the Brotherhood of Badoon (ruled by a "Brother Royal") and the Sisterhood of Badoon (ruled by a queen).

=== Beyonders ===
The Beyonders are enigmatic, virtually omnipotent entities powerful enough to collect planets. They are unable to leave their own dimension and have never been observed by any being of the Earth dimension and to interact with the Earth dimension they must operate through agents. The most notable member of the Beyonders is the Beyonder.

=== Brood ===
The Brood are a parasitic species with insectoid features.

=== Celestials ===
The Celestials are a powerful species who have existed since near the birth of the universe.

=== Chitauri ===
The Chitauri are a species with shapeshifting abilities akin to the Skrulls. Created for the Ultimate Marvel continuity, they have since been established in the main Marvel Universe.

=== Cotati ===
The Cotati are highly intelligent, telepathic plant-like aliens. The Cotati originated on Hala in the Pama star system in the Large Magellanic Cloud, the same planet as the Kree.

=== Dire Wraiths ===
The Dire Wraiths are an evolutionary offshoot of the Skrulls from the Andromeda Galaxy. Like the Skrulls, the Wraiths are shapeshifters, are able to take the forms of other creatures and duplicate their natural (non-magical/super) abilities.

=== Kree ===
The Kree are a scientifically and technologically advanced militaristic species native to the planet Hala in the Large Magellanic Cloud. They were the rivals of the Skrulls.

=== Phalanx ===
The Phalanx are a cybernetic species that form a hive-mind linking each member by a telepathy-like system.

=== Shi'ar ===
The Shi'ar, also called the Aerie, reside in the Shi'ar Empire (or Imperium). The Shi'ar are alien humanoids of avian descent who have feathered crests on top of their heads instead of hair. The Shi'ar's empire is a vast collection of alien species, cultures, and worlds situated close to the Skrull and Kree Empires. The Shi'ar are also called the Aerie.

=== Skrulls ===
The Skrulls are a shapeshifting species from the planet Skrullos. They were the rivals of the Kree.

=== Symbiotes ===
The Symbiotes are a species of amorphous extraterrestrial parasites that envelop their hosts like costumes, creating a symbiotic bond through which the host's mind can be influenced. They are also known as the Klyntar.

=== Watchers ===
The Watchers are the first humanoid species to be created in the Marvel Universe and are committed to observing and compiling knowledge on all aspects of the universe. After an incident with the Prosilicans, the Watchers then took a vow never to interfere with other civilizations. The most known Watcher is Uatu.

== Secondary races ==
Scores of other extraterrestrial species have been depicted in the pages of Marvel Comics publications, though not to the extent of the species mentioned above. This list is not comprehensive.

=== A ===
==== A'askvarii ====
The A'askvarii are a green-skinned humanoid species with octopus traits, possessing two legs (ending in three-toed taloned feet) and tentacles in place of arms. They possess fairly advanced technology, with warp-drive capability. A'askvarii are native to the planet O'erlanii; it is an oceanic world with oceans covering 75% of the planet's surface, and the rest being craggy mountains.

==== A-Chiltarians ====
The A-Chiltarians are a humanoid species possessing many eyes and purple-grey fur over their entire bodies, with four-fingered hands and three-toed feet. They possess a tribal culture, and are mildly aggressive and temperamental. They are native to A-Chiltar III, a marshy planet (60% marsh, 40% prairie), and the atmosphere has a high methane content. Kraglin is an A-Chiltarian.

==== Aakon ====
The Aakon are a species of yellow-skinned, dark-haired humanoids, the Aakon are enemies of the Kree and are allied with the Shadow Consortium. They have an Intergalactic Council and sought the destruction of all human life due to the perceived universal threat of Earth's population of super-beings.

==== Acanti ====
The Acanti are a whale-like species who are benevolent and compassionate by nature. The Acanti are led by the Prophet-Singer, who is the vessel of the Soul, a mystical force that links and motivates the Acanti. When the Prophet-Singer dies, the Soul moves on to another Acanti. The Brood infect individual Acanti with a virus that destroys the higher cognitive functions of their minds, enabling them to be easily controlled and converted into living starships.

==== Acanti in other media ====
- The Acanti appear in the X-Men: The Animated Series episode "Love in Vain".
- The Acanti appear in Marvel's Guardians of the Galaxy.

==== Achernonians ====
The Achernonians are a purple-skinned humanoid species native to the planet Achernon. Achernonians are a tall species, averaging 6'4" tall, and possess only a pre-Industrial level of technology. They are depicted as superstitious, with a dictatorial government. Some possess the ability to become immaterial at will. The planet Achernon is a rocky world, 60% covered in volcanic rock; the atmosphere possesses a high sulfur content.

==== Aedians ====
The Aedians possess telepathic powers; they can sense the presence of others within their planet's orbit. They are also empathic, able to sense the pain or emotions of others. They can project their astral selves, even into orbit. They are thin humanoid bipeds, with an elongated cranium and no nose.

==== Agullo ====
The Agullo are an alien species that was diminished from over 60,000,000 to a few thousands after Thanos came to their planet Ahl-Agullo.

==== Alpha Centaurians ====
The Alpha Centaurians are a humanoid species with fine grey scales and other adaptations (gills, webbed toes) that enable them to live underwater. Their government is a feudal one, organized into several small, independent kingdoms; their culture tends to be self-centered and dispassionate. They are native to Arima, which has water covering 95% of its surface, and its gravity and atmospheric thickness are both approximately twice that of Earth. They possess spacecraft capable of 85% lightspeed.

==== Amebids ====
The Amebids are a jellyfish-like species from the planet Sakaar. Amebids can inflate their bodies with noxious gases that they produce enabling them to float like balloons.

==== Annunaki ====
The Annunaki are an alien species who helped Silver Surfer gather and protect some of Earth's most extraordinary gifted children.

==== Archeopians ====
The Archeopians are from the planet Archeopia. Most of the species was killed when the incubator cube of Galactus was opened and he consumed Archeopia. The small fleet which escaped has since sailed the galaxy for uncounted centuries with other aliens who lost their planets to Galactus called The Wanderers.

==== Arcturans ====
The Arcturans are a humanoid species with pink-white skin. Approximately half their populations are mutants due to a combination of biochemical advancements. They are native to Arcturus IV. Their technology level is comparable to Earth's. The Arcturans Starhawk and Aleta Ogord are members of the Guardians of the Galaxy.

==== Aris ====
The Aris are a species from the planet Ariston.

==== Arthrosians ====
The Arthrosian are an insectoid species originating from the planet Anthros in the Negative Zone. Annihilus is an Arthrosian.

==== Aspirants ====
The Aspirants are a celestial species that were the result of the First Firmament's loneliness.

==== Astrans ====
The Astrans are a humanoid species with yellow skin and toe-less, flat feet, no hair, four lungs, and special glands in the stomach. They have the ability to control metal. Astrans are native to Astra, where 50% of the planet surface is metallic ore, and the remained is split evenly between water and soil.

===== Astrans in other media =====
The Astrans appear in Agents of S.H.I.E.L.D.

==== Ataraxians ====
The Ataraxians are a species from the planet Ataraxia in the Negative Zone.

==== Autocrons ====
The Autocrons are a humanoid species with blue-black skin, two-toed feet, and an average height of 6'5". Their bodies are iron-based rather than carbon-based, and they possess superhuman strength and durability. Their government is ruled by a world-computer (and their level of technology is more than Earth's); their culture is imperialistic, militaristic, and orderly. They are native to Cron, which possess a gravity and atmospheric density almost three times greater than Earth's, and the atmosphere has a high methane content. Cron is rich in metallic ores and only has 4% surface water; mechanized cities cover 85% of the planet.

==== Axi-Tun ====
The Axi-Tun are a humanoid species from the planet Tun. Axi-Tun have energy-manipulating powers. Axi-Tun have a level of technology superior to Earth's, with the capability of faster than light travel.

=== B ===
==== Ba-Bani ====
The Ba-Bani are a humanoid species with yellow skin and orange or yellow hair. They are governed by local military dictatorships, tend to be warlike and engaging in a planet-wide war. They are native to the planet Ba-Banis, an Earth-like world which orbits the star Ba.

==== Baluurians ====
The Baluurians are a humanoid species with superhuman strength and durability. Baluurians are native to the Negative Zone, where they have established an empire. Blastaar and his son Burstaar are Baluurians.

==== Betans ====
The Betans are a humanoid species with light purple skin, two-toed feet, and wings which enable them to fly in low-gravity environments. They live on the planet Beta. Their technology is superior to that of Earth and they are capable of faster than light travel. The people of Beta were engaged in centuries in a war with the neighboring planet Megan.

==== Bidoceros ====
The Bidoceros have flat bodies with a tube-like vocal protuberance.

==== Biphasians ====
The Biphasians are a species from the planet Biphasia.

==== Birjans ====
The Birjans, also known as Landlaks, are a humanoid rock-skinned species from Birj, the sixth moon of the gas giant Marman. Terrax is a Birjan.

==== Blips ====
The Blips are a species of giant electrical aliens. The Blip is part of this species.

==== Builders ====
The Builders are one of the oldest species in the universe and go about building and creating worlds as they see fit, a claim also attributed to the Celestials. Any connection between the two species remains unknown. They are the creators of the Superflow which facilitates White Events. There are two types of Builders: the Creators and the Engineers.

=== C ===
==== Calurnians ====
The Calurnians are a species with cat-like features.

==== Carmondians ====
The Carmondians are a species with a variety of appearances.

==== Centaurians ====
The Centaurians are a humanoid species from Centauri IV. They have blue skin and a red dorsal fin along the back and atop their head that gives them an average height of 7 feet (2.1 m). They have a primitive tribal culture, using bows and arrows in hunting. Yondu of the Guardians of the Galaxy is a Centaurian.

==== Centurii ====
The Centurii are a humanoid species with light yellow skin and a culture composed largely of philosophers and artists. The Centurii are native to Centuri-Six, a planet similar to Earth. The Centurii have a worldwide democracy, and their level of technology is comparable to Earth's.

==== Chameloid ====
The Chameloids are a shapeshifting species of which the various Hobgoblins are members.

==== Chnitt ====
The Chnitt are a spider-like species.

==== Chronomonitors ====
The Chronomonitors are sentient robotic organisms artificially-created by the Time Variance Authority (TVA) using "quantum technology" to fill its lower ranks. The moment a new reality appears, a new faceless agent is created to monitor it, along with the necessary equipment (a personal computer-like device, plus a desk and a chair) to do so.

===== Chronomonitors in other media =====
A species based on the Chronomonitors called Chronicoms appear in Agents of S.H.I.E.L.D..

==== Chr'Ylites ====
The Chr'Ylites are a technomechanical insectoid species from the planet Chr'Yllalisa, resembling a cross between a dragonfly and a helicopter. They are a telepathic species who make for highly exceptional healers and diplomats. The Starjammers' medic Sikorsky is a Chr'Ylite.

==== Ciegrimites ====
The Ciegrimites are a green-skinned hairless humanoid species with snail-like traits, possessing a snail-like shell and stalked eyes. Their technology is incredibly advanced in the area of alcoholic beverage distillation; their homeworld, Ciegrim-7, is known as "the Distiller's Planet."

==== Clavians ====
The Clavians are a humanoid species similar to humans. They live on the planet Clarius, and are a tribal people, with technology inferior to Earth's.

==== Coconut Grove ====
The planet Coconut Grove first appeared in Fallen Angels, as the home of the mutant alien Ariel. The inhabitants of Coconut Grove are physically indistinguishable from humans, but are all capable of teleportation by warping space between two closed doors.

==== Contraxians ====
The Contraxians are a humanoid species with pink or brown skin, who appear as humans except that the left sides of their bodies are darker-hued than the right sides. Contraxians live on the planet Contraxia. Two Contraxian women, going by the names Marcy Kane and Marie Hart, were sent to Earth disguised as humans to find a means to rekindle their sun's dying energies. Marie Hart was able to conceive a child with a human, who grew up to become Jack of Hearts.

==== Courga ====
The Courga are a humanoid dog-like species from the planet Courg.

=== D ===
==== Dakkamites ====
The Dakkamites are a humanoid species similar to humans. Dakkamites come from the planet Dakkam. Exposure to Earth's yellow sun grants them super-powers, as their cells have the ability to absorb and metabolize solar energy to fuel their abilities. Known Dakkamites include Wundarr the Aquarian and Quantum.

==== Darbians ====
The Darbians are a humanoid species similar to humans, but averaging 8'10" in height. Their home planet is Darbia. They are able to generate and project concussive force.

==== Deonists ====
The Deonists are a humanoid species with pale white skin and a slender build. Their homeworld, Deo was once the religious center of a confederation of planets and known as "Templeworld" but is now called "the Doomsday Star", consisting of 75% desert.

==== Dragon-Men ====
The Dragon-Men are a reptilian species from the planet Ligra. They are often in conflict with the Lion-People.

==== Druffs ====
The Druffs are timid creatures from the planet Ryas, averaging 3'6" in height and possessing pink skin covered by brown fur. They possess childlike intelligence, and can reproduce by dividing when struck. They have a lifespan of approximately three Earth-years and are considered to be vermin by the Skrulls.

===== Druffs in other media =====
The Druffs appear in the Hulk and the Agents of S.M.A.S.H. episode "A Druff is Enough", with vocal effects provided by Benjamin Diskin.

==== Duckworldians ====
The Duckworldians are a species of anthropomorphic ducks from Duckworld. Howard the Duck is a Duckworldian.

=== E ===
==== Elan ====
The Elans are a semi-humanoid species with green skin, antennae, and hoof-like feet. They possess vast, virtually limitless psionic powers with which they can rearrange and transmute atoms and telekinetically manipulate objects. The "Infant Terrible" is an infant Elan.

==== Entemen ====
The Entemen are a humanoid species with octopus-like features, including tentacles in place of arms and legs, and have yellow skin and average 6'6" in height. Their home planet is Entem.

==== Epsiloni ====
The Epsiloni are a humanoid species with pink-white skin, a fanged mouth, and toe-less spatulate feet. Epsiloni are parasites, draining life-force from other beings and gaining power from it. Their government was a fascist military dictatorship, and the Epsiloni were ruthless and regarded all other lifeforms as prey.

==== Ergons ====
The Ergons are a humanoid species with red skin, averaging 6'2" in height. They possess superhuman strength, an evolutionary adaptation to their homeworld's higher than normal gravity. Their culture is highly competitive, merciless, and adventurous. Their homeworld, Ergonar, has a gravity twice that of Earth's, is 50% covered in water (mostly ice) and the rest in mountains, and possesses a 90:10, oxygen:methane atmosphere.

==== Eridani ====
The Eridani are a humanoid species that were supposed to handle the waste management for the Alpha Flight Space Program's Low-Orbit Space Station, but cancelled their services due to negotiation issues.

==== Ethereals ====
The Ethereals are a non-humanoid species who believe themselves to be directly evolved from the elementary particles present when the universe was first created. The Ethereals do not normally interact with other species, referred to as "solids" or "corporeals", although the renegade Ethereal Stardust abandoned the Ethereals to serve Galactus. The species was almost exterminated by the Annihilation Wave. A handful of survivors escaped and confronted Stardust, who destroyed them and offered their essences as a gift to Galactus.

==== Exolon ====
The Exolon are a parasitic species created by Knull who feed on the immortal souls of living beings. Wraith is the most notable host of the Exolon.

===== Exolons in other media =====
The Exolons appear in Guardians of the Galaxy.

==== Eyungs ====
The Eyungs are a species who were separated into three branches by the Celestials: the Eternals, Deviants, and the Latents.

=== F ===
==== Flarks ====
The Flarks are a parasitic species whose names are often used as a type of intergalactic profanity.

==== Flb'Dbi ====
The Flb'Dbi are a species of semi-arachnic type creatures 3 feet 8 inches (1.12 m) high, they have four arms and four legs which resemble tentacles. Flb'Dbi are telepathic and have lifespans of many thousands of Earth-years. They come from the planet Jhb'Btt. Half a million years ago, the Flb'Dbi had intermediate-level interstellar vessels; presumably today, they are far more advanced.

==== Flerken ====
The Flerken are alien creatures that resemble house cats. Unlike cats, however, they possess human-level intelligence and can lay eggs. Their mouths contain pocket dimensions used to store and hold almost anything; they can also teleport and summon tentacles with fanged maws from their mouths with which to attack and consume. Chewie is a Flerken.

===== Flerkens in other media =====
The Flerkens appear in media set in the Marvel Cinematic Universe (MCU).

==== Flora colossus ====
The Flora colossi are a tree-like species from Planet X. Groot is a Flora colossus.

===== Flora colossus in other media =====
The Flora colossi appear in Guardians of the Galaxy. Most of the Flora colossi were exterminated by Ronan the Accuser.

==== Fomalhauti ====
The Fomalhauti are an amoebic, amorphous species from the planet Pumor which average 2'5" in height, and are multi-cellular and can form tentacles to manipulate objects. They communicate telepathically.

==== Fonabi ====
The Fonabi are a semi-humanoid species with light yellow skin and large, but weak bodies. A Fonabi named Terminus utilizes a huge energy-transforming device to make him appear to be 150 feet (46 m) tall.

==== Fortisquians ====
The Fortisquians are an alien species created by the Beyonders to spread life throughout the galaxy. Max is a Fortisquain.

==== Froma ====
The Froma are a green-skinned humanoid species from the planet Chize. They are able to levitate psionically. The Froma are ruled by corporations.

=== G ===
==== Galadorians ====
The Galadorians are a humanoid species that appears almost identical to humans, except that they average 6 feet 3 inches (1.91 m) in height. They come from the planet Galador. Rom is a Galadorian.

==== Gegku ====
The Gegku are a reptilian species with green scaled skin, two-toed feet, and average 6 feet 6 inches (1.98 m) in height. Their home planet is Wilamean. Although they have reptilian features, the gegku are more similar to mammals; making them appear to look more cynodont-like in appearance instead.

==== Gigantians ====
The Gigantians are a humanoid species from the planet Gigantus. They were experimented upon by the Celestials.

==== Glx ====
The Glx are a silicon-based humanoid species with yellow skin and heads shaped like flat cylinders. Their home planet is called Glxx, third from the sun in the Zplst star system in the Milky Way galaxy. A Glx named Chleee was responsible for transforming a chain into an "energy synthicon" which linked the criminals Hammer and Anvil together and gave them superhuman powers.

==== Grad Nan Holt ====
The Grad Nan Holt are an alien species who were enslaved by the Shi'ar.

==== Gramosians ====
The Gramosians are a humanoid species with blue-black skin and the ability to discharge energy through their hands. They come from the planet Gramos, third from the sun in the Sekar star system in the Milky Way. Years ago, the planet's magnetic polarity changed, admitting radiation from space which caused mass insanity and death until normalcy was restored by the debris of Xorr the God-Jewel. Mercurio the Fourth-Dimensional Man is a Gramosian.

==== Grosgumbeekians ====
The Grosgumbeekians are a quadrupedal species from the planet Grosgumbeek. They are highly adapted for great speed and can easily travel faster than the speed of light.

==== Grunds ====
The Grunds are a humanoid species that averages only 3 feet 2 inches (0.97 m) in height, Grunds have yellow skin and a pair of antennae atop their heads that absorb energy for concussive blasts. Their home planet is Grundar, fifth from the sun in the Quat star system in the Milky Way. The Grund named Grott the Man-Slayer was one of the agents of Korvac.

==== Guna ====
The Guna are a reptilian species that measures 5 feet 6 inches (1.68 m) tall on average and have semi-scaled green skin with frontal plate-like formations. Their hands and feet are adapted for digging. The Guna come from the planet Gunava, first from the sun in the Janoth star system in the Andromeda galaxy. They have a planetwide technocratic dictatorship, and their technology is advanced to the point of interstellar travel and vast solar energy converters.

=== H ===
==== H'ylthri ====
The H'ylthri are an other-dimensional, sentient plant-like species. Their bodies are vegetable fiber with few vital organs, making them difficult to injure. They possess superhuman strength to an unspecified level, can control other plant life, and extend both tangling vines or poisonous barbs to knock mammals unconscious. They can grow humanoid doppelgangers with the originals' personality and memories.

==== Halfworlders ====
The Halfworlders are a species that were created from Earth animals by an unnamed humanoid species on Halfworld. Blackjack O'Hare, Lylla, Pyko, Rocket Raccoon, and Wal Rus are Halfworlders.

===== Halfworlders in other media =====
- The Halfworlders appear in Guardians of the Galaxy.
- The Halfworlders appear in Guardians of the Galaxy Vol. 3. These versions were created by the High Evolutionary.

==== Herms ====
The Herms are a whale-like species with yellow-white skin that can absorb all manner of electromagnetic energy for strength and substance, which can also allow them to briefly transform into beings of pure energy; they can apparently travel through intergalactic space in energy form. Klaatu is a Herm.

==== Hibers ====
The Hibers are a humanoid species who resemble humans, but lack hair. Their home planet is Hiberlac, sixth from the sun in the Hunyoc star system in the Milky Way. They spend most of their lives in suspended animation, coming out only once every thousand years when the planet thaws.

==== Hodinns ====
The Hodinns are one of the many alien species that were integrated into the Shi'ar Empire. A species of sapient suns who're on the verge of dying out, there are two known Hodinn who served in the Shi'ar imperial guard. One known as G-Type who was supposedly killed by Xorn, while another was a convict recruited by Vulcan into his Praetorian Imperial Guard then killed by the primary guardsmen when Havok drained his stellar energy.

==== Hodomurians ====
The Hodomurians are a species originating from an unnamed planet. Century is a Hodomurian created from the minds of 100 Hodomurians after their planet was destroyed.

==== Honchi ====
The Honchi are a slug-like species.

==== Horde ====
Every planet whose life was experimented on by the Celestials, resulted in two species with opposite moralities. If the worse won over the better, the insectoid Horde were given that planet's life form's energy. If the better won over the worse, the Celestials were given energy to experiment more.

==== Horusians ====
The Horusians are a humanoid species with brown or yellow skin, that averages 7 feet (2.1 m) tall. They come from the planet Horus IV in the Horus star system in the Milky Way. Using machines, they can simulate psionic powers, and disguise themselves as the native gods of whatever planet they visit in order to inspire awe. When they visited Earth, they wore masks to make them resemble the gods of Heliopolis.

==== Hujah ====
The Hujah are a species that resembles giant green snakes with an average of 16 feet 4 inches (4.98 m) in length. The Hujah live on the planet Huj, seventeenth from the sun in the Zuccone star system in the Milky Way. They have psychokinetic powers that compensate for their lack of arms.

=== I ===
==== Inaku ====
The Inaku are a blue-skinned species from the planet of the same name. After something happened to their planet, the surviving Inaku stumbled blindly in the dark until they settled on Weirdworld and had put up a protective dome that kept their village safe from the Skrullduggers. The Inaku were also loyal to Witch Queen le Fay as her magic helped keep the Skrullduggers in line.

==== Interdites ====
The Interdites are a humanoid species with blue skin, they have developed precognition as well as other psionic powers. They come from the planet Interdis, seventh from the sun in the Tartaru star system in the Milky Way. Their civilization was demolished by the Badoon, and surviving Interdites have turned to mysticism and live like hermits scattered across the galaxy.

==== Iron Knights ====
The Iron Knights are a humanoid species with red skin and dark hair, they have weapons, armor and technology that appears identical to that of European knights of the late Middle Ages. They are also immensely strong, so much so that even an adolescent boy can easily overpower the Hulk. The knights come from another dimension that the Hulk accessed through the Crossroads in The Incredible Hulk (vol. 2) #302. They share their world, which is called Paradise, with the Greens, a green-skinned humanoid species who are much weaker but have powerful magic, and with an orange skinned species of dwarves.

=== J ===
==== Jovians ====
There are two types of Jovians:

- The first Jovians are wolf-like aliens from Jupiter.
- The second version of the Jovians are aliens descended from genetically engineered humans who live on the planet Jupiter. Charlie-27 is a Jovian.

==== Judans ====
The bodies of the Judans are 12 feet (3.7 m) tall on average and consist of an oval-shaped trunk with enormous facial features, four arms, and two legs; they support this weight by generating psychokinetic force from their enormous brains. Their home planet is Dyofor, second from the sun in the Palyn star system in the Milky Way.

==== Jyn'ai ====
The Jyn'ai (also called Jynai, Jinni, and Genie) are genie-like creatures that frequently manifest upon the material plane. They deal with specific humans using their powers to grant wishes. They have reality-warping powers and can manipulate matter and energy, also can use some psionic powers like telepathy, clairvoyance and a kind of psychic erosion. Although the jyn'ai are creatures from the astral plane they can assume human shape when they are on the material plane.

=== K ===
==== K'aitians ====
The K'aitians are a humanoid species with green skin, for the most part identical to humans. They are a primitive people native to the planet K'ai in the microverse, and were ruled over by Jarella for a time.

==== K'Lanti ====
The K'Lanti are a humanoid species with pale skin, featureless eyes and the ability to levitate. They dress regally, favoring long flowing robes and ornate chest-pieces. They were wracked with civil war, until the retrieval of an object called the Harmonium, which played music that they found greatly pleasing.

==== Kallusians ====
The Kallusians are a humanoid species with deep pink skin, with white or gray hair. Kallusians come from the planet Kallu, third from the sun in the Kallu-Kan star system in the Andromeda Galaxy.

===== Kallusians in other media =====
- The Kallusians appear in the Guardians of the Galaxy episode "Jingle Bell Rock".
- The Kallusians appear in Agents of S.H.I.E.L.D.

==== Kamado ====
The Kamado are a humanoid species with an exaggeratedly muscular physique. Their home planet is Mikkaz, seventh from the sun in the Dopner star system in the Milky Way. In an alternate 20th century, the Defenders, while investigating a UFO sighting, inadvertently caused the son of the Kamado king and his followers to commit suicide. In response, when the Kamado king found their remains four hundred years later, he ordered the annihilation of Earth. To prevent this occurrence from coming about, the original Defenders disbanded.

==== Karidians ====
The Karidians are a species from the planet Karidia. Their planet was saved from their dying unstable sun by Silver Surfer.

==== Kawa ====
The Kawa are a reptilian semi-humanoid species with orange skin that averages 10 feet (3.0 m) in height. They come from the planet Kawa in the Bawa Kawa star system in the Andromeda Galaxy. After Galactus destroyed their planet, the Kawa began to worship him as their god and even lead him to sacrificial planets.

==== Kigors ====
The Kigor are a crab-like species from Cancrius III.

==== Klangians ====
The Klangians are a humanoid species from the planet Klang.

==== Klklk ====
The Klklk are an insectoid species covered with chitinous carapaces that averages 8 feet (2.4 m) in length from head to end of tail. Their homeworld is La'kll, fourth from the sun in the Tl'blk star system in the Milky Way. They have antennae which can project disintegrating blasts. Klklk can exude thin but strong web-like filaments, and queens have demonstrated telepathy.

==== Kodabaks ====
The Kodabaks are a humanoid pig-like species with two digits on each appendage, averaging 6 feet 2 inches (1.88 m) in height. They come from the planet Kodaba, seventh from the sun in the Grosgumbique star system in the Milky Way.

==== Korbinites ====
The Korbinites are a humanoid species with light orange skin, averaging 6 feet 2 inches (1.88 m) in height, and originating in the so-called "Burning Galaxy". Beta Ray Bill is a modified Korbinite.

===== Korbinites in other media =====
The Korbinites appear in the Avengers Assemble episode "New Frontiers".

==== Kosmosians ====
The Kosmosians are a semi-reptilian species with similarities to multi-cellular amoeboids, with bodies that can "flow" as they move, thereby changing their length, which is 50' on average. Kosmosians come from the planet Kosmos, fifth from the sun in the Zokka star system, in the Milky Way. They have limited telepathic abilities which cause victims to be hypnotized into ceasing to live.

==== Kronans ====
The Kronans are a semi-humanoid species, also known as "the Stone Men of Saturn", whose orange bodies are silicon-based and 8 feet (2.4 m) tall on average, with thick, virtually impenetrable stone-like hides. Their home planet is Ria, first from the sun in the Krona star system in the Milky Way. As revealed in World War Hulk: Aftersmash: Warbound #4, Kronans are genderless and do not reproduce sexually, emerging from Ria itself. The most notable Kronan has been the Hulk's ally Korg.

===== Kronans in other media =====
Kronans appear in the Marvel Cinematic Universe films Thor: The Dark World, Thor: Ragnarok, Thor: Love and Thunder, Avengers: Endgame and Guardians of the Galaxy Vol. 2. Thor: Love and Thunder featured the Kronan deity Ninny (voiced by Taika Waititi).

==== Krozzar ====
The Krozzar are a scaly-skinned species.

==== Krylorians ====
The Krylorians are a semi-humanoid species from the planet Krylor, third from the sun in the Aceta star system in the Andromeda galaxy. Krylorians have an extremely high level of technology, with advanced interstellar ships powered and guided psionically. They are also advanced in molecular-scale manipulation, transmutation, and robotics. Bereet is a known Krylorian.

==== Krylorians in other media ====
The Krylorians appear in Guardians of the Galaxy.

==== Kt'kn ====
The Kt'kn are a semi-insectoid species with 2" spherical bodies with six spindly legs. They come from the planet Kn'kn, first from the sun in the Tk'kn star system in the Milky Way. They can communicate telepathically and have psionic senses rather than physical ones.

==== Kymellians ====
The Kymellians are a species resembling humanoid horses. Aelfyre Whitemane, who gave the Power Pack their powers, is a Kymellian. The superhero Kid Colt (Elric Whitemane) was transformed into a Kymellian-like form after government agents paid his parents to let them give him special "tests".

=== L ===
==== Laxidazians ====
The Laxidazians are a humanoid species with pointed ears. They average 4 feet 5 inches (1.35 m) in height. They come from the planet Laxidazia, fourth from the sun in the Dolenz star system in the Milky Way. The hedonistic Laxidazians imbibe an illegal mutagenic beverage which transforms them into troll-like forms. Pip the Troll is a Laxidazian.

==== Lem ====
The Lem are a semi-serpentine species with red skin that averages 4 feet 9 inches (1.45 m) in height. They come from the planet Lemista, sixth from the sun in the Atianti star system in the Milky Way. They have tails instead of legs, but can stand and traverse in a semi-upright position. Krugarr is a Lem.

==== Levians ====
The Levians are a humanoid species with blue skin that otherwise looks very similar to Earth humans. Surviving Levians live aboard the "world-ship" Levianon. Their homeworld Levia was destroyed as they depleted the planet of magma and resources.

==== Lion-People ====
The Lion-People are a humanoid lion-like species from the planet Ligra. They are often in conflict with the Dragon-Men.

==== Lithodia Rexians ====
The Lithodia Rexians are a species from the planet Lithodia Rex with an appearance akin to Moai. One group of Lithodia Rex's sleeper agents was placed on Easter Island.

==== Ludberdites ====
The Ludberdites are a humanoid fish-like species from the planet Zaar.

==== Lumina ====
The Lumina are a humanoid species that stands 5'5" in height on average, and appears just about identical to humans. They come from the planet Lumin, ninth from the sun in the Sh'Mengi star system in the Milky Way. They have average lifespans of thousands of years. They are members of the federation of alien species called the Charter (along with the Lem, Myndai, and Nanda).

==== Lupak ====
The Lupak are one of the many alien species that are part of the Shi'ar Imperium. They can manipulate cosmic energy and are nigh-invulerable. Fang of the Imperial Guard is a Lupak.

==== Luphomoids ====
The Luphomoids are a humanoid species with blue skin. Nebula and Spirit are Luphomoids.

=== M ===
==== M'Hassians ====
The M'Hassians are an alien species from the planet M'Hass.

==== M'Ndavians ====
The M'Ndavians are a semi-humanoid species with yellow skin and large, diamond-shaped heads, averaging 6 feet 3 inches (1.91 m) in height. They possess highly advanced intellects. They live on the planet M'Ndavi, tenth from the sun in the B'lbwo star system in the Shi'ar galaxy. they have the most complex legal system in the known galaxies and are used by the Shi'ar for matters of great significance to the empire.

==== Majesdanians ====
The Majesdanians are able to absorb and project solar energy. They are enemies of the Skrulls and are at war with them. Their homeworld is hidden under the guise of a white dwarf star and they have remained hidden from attack for years. Karolina Dean is a Majesdanian.

==== Makluans ====
The Makluans are a dragon-like species with green to orange skin that average 32 feet (9.8 m) in height when upright. They come from the planet Maklu-IV – also known as Kakaranathara – in the Maklu star system of the Greater Magellanic Cloud, in the Milky Way, and are also known as the Kakaranatharans. Fin Fang Foom is a Makluan. His species, or at least a small faction of it, invaded China by accident when their spaceship crashed, but he was (eventually) put to sleep by narcotic herbs.

==== Mandos ====
The Mandos are a humanoid species with green skin, averaging 9 feet 1 inch (2.77 m) in height. They come from the planet Mand, eight from the sun in the Tumbia star system in the Andromeda galaxy. Mandos are superhumanly strong and can withstand the vacuum of space.

==== Mannequins ====
The Mannequins are an amoeba-like species with tentacles.

==== Martians ====
Earth-616 has the most varied amount of beings termed as "Martians" as any other reality in the Multiverse. Likely for the reasons cited above. However, many of these different species have yet to be classified.

==== Marvanites ====
The Marvanites are a semi-humanoid species with large craniums and green skin, averaging 40' in height. They come from the planet Marvan, fifth from the sun in the Mawnolf star system. They have psionic abilities which allow them to overcome the pull of gravity on their huge bodies and levitate themselves; their psionics also allow them to project destructive force beams from their eyes and teleport.

==== Megans ====
The Megans are a semi-reptilian, semi-humanoid species with one eye, red skin, large ears, and suction cups at the end of each digit. They live on the planet Mega, third from the sun, in the Mirpet star system in the Milky Way. The people of Mega were engaged in centuries in a war with the neighboring planet Beta.

==== Mekkans ====
The Mekkans are a semi-humanoid robotic species with superhuman strength. They come from the planet Mekka, second from the sun in the Kirthom star system in the Milky Way. Their planet was originally called Maarin, after the humanoids who lived there. They built the Mekkans as servants, but after the Maarin were all killed by an extraplanetary spore virus, the Mekkans took control of the planet. Torgo is a Mekkan.

==== Mentelleronites ====
The Mentelleronites are a giant humanoid species with reality-warping abilities. Orrgo is a Mentelleronite.

==== Mephitisoids ====
The Mephitisoids are a furry humanoid species with a combination of originally skunk-like and later also cat-like characteristics, they have night vision, retractable claws, acute senses, pointed ears, and tails. They come from the planet Tryl'sart, third from the sun in the Cyrane Om'lr star system in the Shi'ar galaxy. They communicate using pheromones. Hepzibah of the Starjammers is a Mephitisoid. Male Mephitisoids can generate pheromones that can subject almost any humanoid that breathes them in to their will.

==== Mercurians ====
The Mercurians are a species descended from genetically engineered humans who live on the planet Mercury. Nikki is from the planet Mercury.

==== Microns ====
The Microns are inhabitants of Ithaka in the Homeworld region from the sub-atomic universe.

==== Mobians ====
The Mobians are a humanoid species with orange skin and hair, averaging 8' in height. They come from the planet Mobius, eleventh from the sun in the Lemivell star system in the Andromeda Galaxy. Mobians can survive in the vacuum of space for short periods.

==== Morani ====
The Morani are a semi-humanoid species with green skin and hair, averaging 19 feet 6 inches (5.94 m) in height. Some Morani possess the ability to project bioelectric energy. Morani come from the planet Moran, fourth from the sun in the Jark star system in the Andromeda Galaxy.

==== Mummudrai ====
The Mummudrai, also called Revenants, are a psychic energy-based species of extra-dimensional origin. They represent the perfected anti-self of every being they're born alongside of in the universe, a malicious and evil species hailing from the darkest regions of the Astral Plane called Underworld. The mummudrai have the inherent ability to manipulate genetic and cellular matter at a near biomolecular level to fabricate bodies of their own or hideously degrade the biophysical structure of others. They jealously long to reach the physical plane and usurp their counterparts' place in it, many having access to mental powers on top of all their twin's fullest potential on hand. Cassandra Nova, an enemy of the X-Men, is a Mummudrai and Charles Xavier's twin sister.

==== Myndai ====
The Myndai are a humanoid species which appears very similar to Earth humans. The Myndai were once members of the federation of species called the Charter (along with the Lem, Lumina, and Nanda). They were engaged in a galaxy-wide war with the Lumina, and some were placed on Earth in suspended animation eons ago as sleeper agents.

=== N ===
==== Nanda ====
The Nanda are a semi-humanoid species with light green skin and large ovular heads, which average 6 feet (1.8 m) in height. They come from the planet Nanda, second from the sun in the Particulus star system in the Milky Way. They are members of the alien federation called the Charter (along with the Lem, Lumina, and Myndai).

==== Nicanthans ====
The Nicanthans are a hammerhead shark-like species from the planet Nicanthus Prime in the Negative Zone.

==== Nuwali ====
The Nuwali created the Savage Land for the Beyonders. They appear like hunched-over reptilians with massive, boxy trunks and short limbs.

==== Nymenians ====
The Nymenians are a humanoid hippopotamus-like species with light purple skin that averages 6 feet 4 inches (1.93 m) in height. Their home planet is Eomuma, fourth from the sun in the Myunimo star system in the Andromeda galaxy. The Nymenians live in tribal clans.

=== O ===
==== Olympians ====
The Olympians in Thor & Hercules: Encyclopaedia Mythologica #1 (September 2009). Art by Kevin Sharpe

The Olympians are based on the Twelve Olympians/Dii Consentes and other deities of Classical mythology. The Olympians are related to every other pantheon of gods that have ever been worshiped on Earth, such as the Asgardians and the Gods of Heliopolis (ancient Egypt).

Notable known members include: Ares, Athena, Hecate, Hephaestus (Hephaestus Aetnaeus), Hera (Hera Argeia), Hercules (Herakles), Hermes (Hermes Diaktoros), Poseidon (Poseidon Aegaeus), Nox (Nyx), Phobos, Pluto (Hades), Tharamus, Venus (Aphrodite Ourania), and Zeus (Zeus Panhellenios).

The Olympians appear in Thor: Love and Thunder with Zeus portrayed by Russell Crowe, Dionysus portrayed by Simon Russell Beale, Hercules portrayed by Brett Goldstein, Minerva voiced by Carmen Foon, and Artemis voiced by Priscilla Doueihy. Zeus, Dionysus, Minerva, and Artemis appear as members of the Council of Godheads.

==== Oobagonians ====
The Oobagonians are a species from Oobagon VIII. Their faces are large and resemble tiki masks of Earth.

==== Orthoxalith ====
The Orthoxalith are unintelligent rock-like creatures capable of withstanding high gravity and radiation. They are bred as slaves. Shell of the Shi'ar Death Commandos is an Orthoxalith.

==== Outriders ====
The Outriders are a genetically engineered species with the purpose of serving their maker Thanos and the Black Order until they die.

===== Outriders in other media =====
The Outriders appear in the Marvel Cinematic Universe films Avengers: Infinity War and Avengers: Endgame.

==== Ovoids ====
The Ovoids are a semi-humanoid species with large, oval-shaped heads and yellow skin, and are 8 feet (2.4 m) in height on average. They come from the planet Birkeel, third from the sun in the Janstak star system in the Milky Way. They are capable of levitating objects psionically, and are capable of mind transfer. When they are about to die, they transfer their minds into apparently inanimate bodies that have been prepared for them. The Ovoids once rescued Doctor Doom and taught him their mind-transferring technique.

=== P ===
==== Pangorians ====
The Pangorians are a species of alien pirates from the planet Pangoria.

==== Pegasusians ====
The Pegasusians are a reptilian species with light green skin that average 20 feet (6.1 m) in height. They live on the planet Lar, fifth from the sun in the Stinlar star system in the Milky Way. Pegasusians can psionically project anti-gravitons to support their large mass in high gravities.

==== Pheragots ====
The Pheragots are a semi-humanoid species with light blue skin that averages 10 feet (3.0 m) in height. They come from the planet Arago-7 in the Arago star system in the Andromeda galaxy. They have extraordinary superhuman strength, but are primarily peaceful.

==== Plodex ====
The Plodex are an entirely non-humanoid species and are shapeless blobs in their natural form. They are able to adapt to forms capable of creating and manipulating advanced technology, which in turn can study, alternate and improve genetic material to augment themselves or others with. Marrina Smallwood of Alpha Flight is a Plodex.

==== Pluvians ====
The Pluvians are a species descended from genetically engineered humans who live on the planet Pluto. Martinex is a Pluvian.

==== Poisons ====
The Poisons are a symbiotic species originating from an alternative universe overrun by symbiotes.

==== Poppupians ====
The Poppupians are a semi-humanoid species with light green skin that is able to assume virtually any form within a certain range of mass. Poppupians can also levitate and traverse interstellar space without starships, and they reproduce asexually by massive cell division. Galactus destroyed their home planet of Poppup. The Impossible Man is a Poppupian.

==== Procyonites ====
The Procyonites are a reptilian species with a tortoise-like shell and brown scales, 6 feet 5 inches (1.96 m) in height on average. They come from the planet Perratin, second from the sun in the Procyon star system in the Milky Way.

==== Progenitors ====
The Progenitors are an ancient species with floating heads who isolated themselves. The Progenitors are the creators of the Kree.

==== Prosilicans ====
The Prosilicans are a species who inspired the Watchers' oath of non-interference. It all started when they destroyed themselves in a nuclear war on the planet Prosilicus after having been given the secret of atomic energy by the Watchers' well-meaning ancestors. The surviving Prosilicans later relocated to the planet Partha with a cover-up that their planet was destroyed by a rogue asteroid.

=== Q ===
==== Queega ====
The Queega are a reptilian species with green scaled skin that average 6 feet (1.8 m) tall. Their home planet is Queeg, fourth from the sun in the Quolan star system in the Andromeda galaxy. They can generate electrical energy around their heads, and they breathe and speak through small orifices in their foreheads. They can project intense waves of coldness from their foreheads.

==== Quist ====
The Quists are a humanoid species similar to humans, but averaging 6 feet 4 inches (1.93 m) tall. Their home planet is Quistalium, second from the sun in the Quistraa star system in the Milky Way. Lucifer is a Quist and Dominus was created by Quists.

==== Quo Modari ====
The Quo Modari are a purple-skinned semi-humanoid species that stands over 6 feet (1.8 m) tall and has four eyes. They are pacifistic and dedicated to the arts of diplomacy and the inter-species community.

==== Quons ====
The Quons are a semi-humanoid species with leathery brown skin that averages 6 feet 4 inches (1.93 m) tall. They come from the planet Quon, third from the sun in the Byjak star system in the Milky Way. They are amphibious, possessing both lungs and gills. They are superhumanly strong, to survive both great water pressure and their planet's gravity.

==== Quwrlln ====
The Quwrlln are an ancient alien species that learned about the threat of Galactus.

=== R ===
==== R'malk'i ====
The R'malk'i are a plant-like species who resemble trees and average 6 feet 8 inches (2.03 m) in height. They live on the planet R'makl'z in the C'lehr'ee star system in the Milky Way. They communicate telepathically and are mobile but must take root in their native soil when asleep.

==== R'zahnians ====
The R'zahnians are a red-skinned humanoid species from the planet R'zahn, second from the sun in the Lahj'kk star system in the Milky Way. They have a planetwide monarchy.

==== Rajaks ====
The Rajaks are a semi-humanoid species with green skin, averaging 6 feet (1.8 m) tall. Their home planet is Rajak, fifth from the sun in the Jakkel star system. Their society consists of confederacies of large space piracy organizations, which wipe out all life on a planet with their "delta-ray" cannon, in order to plunder them of valuable elements. Many Rajaki were destroyed by Ultimo when he razed their planet.

===== Rajaks in other media =====
The Rajaks appear in Agents of S.H.I.E.L.D.

==== Recluses ====
The Recluses are an alien species who sued the Watchers for the right of seclusion and privacy.

==== Recorders ====
The Recorders are robots created by the Rigellians as scouts. Recorders are occasionally seen assisting various cosmic entities – for instance, one of them once lived at Uatu the Watcher's home on the Moon and observed the apparent death of Jean Grey as Phoenix. Another Recorder, RT-Z9, works for the Living Tribunal's Magistrati.

===== Recorders in other media =====
Recorder 3B02, also referred to as "Cora," appears in Marvel's Wastelanders.

==== Reptoids ====
The Reptoids are a reptilian species with green scaled skin and a snake-like head and tail, they are 6 feet (1.8 m) tall on average when standing erect. Their home planet is Tayp, second from the sun in the Kormuk star system in the Milky Way. A Reptoid named Teju served as a minion of Korvac in the 30th Century.

==== Rhunians ====
The Rhunians are a humanoid species that resemble Earth humans with pointed ears, but are about 300 feet (91 m) tall on average. They come from the planet Rhun, in the Vulliger star system. They are capable of deriving energy through destroying stars and other planets.

==== Rigellians ====
The Rigellians, also known as the Colonizers of Rigel, are a scientifically and technologically advanced species devoted towards amassing an empire via colonization. Tana Nile and Mentacle are Rigellians.

===== Rigellians in other media =====
The Rigellians appear in Guardians of the Galaxy.

==== Roclites ====
The Roclites are a semi-humanoid species with reddish-brown to dark brown skin, they average 8 feet (2.4 m) tall. They come from the planet Rocklon, fifth from the sun in the Tarl star system in the Milky Way. The Blood Brothers are Roclites.

==== Ruul ====
The Ruul are an evolved form of the Kree.

=== S ===
==== Sagittarians ====
The Sagittarians are a humanoid species with grey skin, standing 6 feet 2 inches (1.88 m) on average, Male Saggitarians have fins atop their heads. They originate from the planet Berhert, third from the sun in the Rempit star system in the Milky Way.

==== Sakaarans ====
The Sakaarans are a group of species from the planet Sakaar.

- The Sakaaran Imperials are red to pink-skinned humanoids and are the ruling class on Sakaar.
- The Shadow People are sandy-brown or orange-tan to gray-skinned humanoids who live on several planets, with most of them residing on Sakaar.
- The Sakaaran Natives are an insectoid species from the deserts of Sakaar.

===== Sakaarans in other media =====
- The Sakaarans appear in the Marvel Cinematic Universe films Guardians of the Galaxy and Thor: Ragnarok.
- The Sakaarans appear in Planet Hulk.

==== Sarks ====
The Sarks are a humanoid species with light blue skin, standing 6 feet 1 inch (1.85 m) on average. They come from the planet Sarka, third from the sun in the Tilnast star system in the Milky Way. Sarks are among the highest officials in the Universal Church of Truth.

==== Saurids ====
The Saurids are a species of amphibious reptilians with both lungs and gills, as well as green scaled skin with yellow fins. Their home planet is Timor, fourth from the sun in the Varanus star system, in the Shi'ar galaxy. Ch'od of the Starjammers is a Saurid.

==== Scatter ====
The Scatter are an insect-like hive minds inhabiting humanoid shells.

==== Sentimault ====
The Sentimault are a species whose home planet was destroyed by the Builders. Their robotic bodies protect them from the hostile environments.

==== Sirians ====
The Sirians are a humanoid species appearing identical to Earth humans and are ruled by a dictatorship. They inhabit both their home planet of Sirius III and a colony on Sirius IV in the Sirius star system in the Milky Way. The Sirians were conquered by the Quists.

==== Siris ====
The Siris are a semi-octopus species with ten fingered tentacles and light green skin, averaging 6' in height (not including the tentacles). They come from the planet Yormot, second from the sun in the Sirius star system in the Milky Way. The Mutant Master was a Siris.

==== Sirusites ====
The Sirusites are a humanoid species that appears virtually indistinguishable from Earth humans. They live on the planet Sirus X, in the Al'Ma'an star system in the Milky Way. Sirus X is the Holy Planet of the galaxy-wide Universal Church of Truth theocratic empire.

==== Skrullduggers ====
The Skrullduggers are shapeshifting dragon-like creatures from the Skrull homeworld. When they arrived on Weirdworld, they became an invasive species. The magic of Witch Queen le Fay keeps them in line.

==== Sleepwalkers ====
The Sleepwalkers are a species who patrol the Mindscape, a parallel dimension that connects the minds of all living beings, to protect those minds from the invasions of monsters and demons. Physically, they resemble gaunt humanoids with long limbs, olive-green skin, and red compound eyes. One of these entities became trapped in the mind of university student Rick Sheridan and gained the ability to manifest on Earth whenever Rick slept, becoming a superhero.

==== Sligs ====
The Sligs are a brown insectoid species with eight tentacle-like limbs, the front limbs of which can be used for grasping and manipulating objects. Sligs have telepathic powers, and can levitate themselves. They come from the planet Ankara, sixth from the sun in the Ryneb star system in the Milky Way.

==== Sloggs ====
The Sloggs are a slug-like species from the planet Sloggo-Prime. They are chronally-challenged.

==== Sm'ggani ====
The Sm'ggani are a semi-insectoid species with orange skin and a brown shell that averages 7 feet 2 inches (2.18 m) tall. They have suction disks on their fingers and feet and superhuman strength; some can alter the density of part or all of their bodies so that they can pass through other solid objects. They come from the planet M'ggani, fifth from the sun in the T'letio star system in the Milky Way.

==== Snarfs ====
The Snarfs are a reptilian species.

==== Sneepers ====
The Sneepers are a semi-humanoid species with green skin that averages 5 feet 8 inches (1.73 m) tall. They come from the planet Sneep, fourth from the sun in the Snuup star system in the Milky Way. The Sneepers have built a small interplanetary empire and intend to rule the entire galaxy someday.

==== Solons ====
The Solons are a humanoid species with blue skin that averages 9' in height. Their home planet is Solon, fourth from the sun in the Nardea star system in the Milky Way. They are a race of purpose-bred clones with psionic powers.

==== Soul-Eaters ====
The Soul-Eaters are also called Souleaters or Soul Eaters

==== Spartoi ====
The Spartoi, also called Spartaxians, are a human-like species from the planet Spartax. Star-Lord, J'son, and Captain Victoria are known Spartoi.

===== Spartoi in other media =====
The Spartoi appear in Guardians of the Galaxy.

==== Sssth ====
The Sssth are a reptilian semi-humanoid species with green skin, and a mane of red, yellow, or orange hair, Sssth are 8 feet (2.4 m) tall on average. They come from the planet Sszardil, second from the sun in the Sslirteep star system in the Milky Way.

==== Starsharks ====
The Starsharks are also called Star Sharks or Space Sharks

==== Star-Headed Old Ones ====
The Star-Headed Old Ones are a winged species of the Old Ones who came to Earth and built a city which came to be known as the Mountain of Madness.

==== Stenth ====
The Stenth are a semi-humanoid species with yellow skin that stands 5 feet 10 inches (1.78 m) on average. They come from the planet Stent, fifth from the sun in the Duggil star system in the Milky Way.

==== Stonians ====
The Stonians are a species with a gargoyle-like appearance; most are around 6 feet (1.8 m) tall, although some grow up to 25 times that. Stonians inhabit the planets Stonus I through Stonus V in the Stonus star system in the Milky Way. Gorgolla is a Stonian.

==== Strontians ====
The Strontians are humanoid purple-skinned aliens that are part of the Shi'ar Empire ever since Majestor T'Korr brought them the cure to the Wraith Plague that ravaged their planet. Gladiator of the Shi'ar Imperial Guard is a Strontian.

==== Stygians ====
The Stygians are a semi-humanoid species that are part of the Shi'ar Empire. Neutron is a Stygian.

=== T ===
==== Taa-ans ====
The Taa-ans are a humanoid species from the planet Taa, a planet that existed in the universe prior to the setting of primary Marvel continuity. Galan is originally a human or humanoid before he becomes the cosmic entity Galactus.

==== Talbosians ====
The Talbosians are a wolf-like species from the planet Talbos.

==== Taurians ====
The Taurians are a semi-humanoid species with orange skin that averages 7 feet (2.1 m) in height. Their home planet of Taur in the Jenzen star system in the Milky Waywas destroyed by Galactus. A few Taurians escaped and now live aboard starships with other aliens who lost their planets to Galactus called The Wanderers.

==== Technarchy ====
The Technarchy, or Technarch, are a cybernetic, shape-shifting alien species. They were created by the Phalanx, however due to their aggressive nature, they truly believe themselves to be the progenitors of the Phalanx, and even consider them abominations of their species, unaware that their origins lie in fact with the Phalanx. They travel the universe looking for things on which to feed, which can be organic or mechanical. They feed by infecting their prey with the transmode virus, converting it into techno-organic matter, from which they then drain the energy.

==== Tektons ====
The Tektons are a semi-humanoid species covered with purple fur, averaging 6 feet 2 inches (1.88 m) in height. They come from the planet Tekton, ninth from the sun in the Tacuspar star system in the Andromeda galaxy. The Tektons possess superhuman strength and prehensile tails.

==== Teuthidans ====
The Teuthidans are a one-eyed squid-like species from the planet Teuthida.

===== Teuthidans in other media =====
The Teuthidans appear in Lego Marvel Super Heroes 2.

==== Thuvrians ====
The Thuvrians are a humanoid species with large heads, averaging 6 feet 1 inch (1.85 m) in height. Their home planet is Thuvria, third from the sun in the Lomyra star system in the Milky Way. As of 200 years ago, their development was arrested at a level comparable to the European Middle Ages.

==== Tribbitites ====
The Tribbitites, or Toad Men are they are commonly called, are a semi-humanoid reptilian species with scaly orange skin who are 5 feet (1.5 m) tall on average. They originated from the planet Kroke, but currently live on the artificial world of Tribbit. They have advanced technology stolen from other species, and specialize in powerful magnetic technology.

===== Tribbitites in other media =====
The Tribbitites appear in the Hulk and the Agents of S.M.A.S.H. episode "Monsters No More".

==== Tribunals ====
The Tribunals are beings of sentient energy that can take on whatever physical form they desire. They possess untold psionic energy-manipulative abilities, and are even capable of moving objects through time.

==== Troyjans ====
The Troyjans are a species of warlords who conquered galaxies. Arm'Cheddon is a Troyjan who commands the squadron of conquerors.

==== Tsiln ====
The Tsiln are a species with both reptilian and mammalian characteristics (reminiscent of cynodonts), with orange to gray scaled skin, and average 300' in height. They come from the planet Broi, second from the sun in the Wyllys star system in the Milky Way. Gog is a Tsiln.

==== Tsyrani ====
The Tsyrani are a humanoid species with six fingers on each hand and six toes on each foot. They come from the planet Tsorcherhi, third from the sun in the Ella star system in the Shi'ar galaxy. They are ruled by a matriarchal monarchy under supervision of the Shi'ar Empire.

=== U ===
==== Ul'lula'ns ====
The Ul'lula'ns are a shapeshifting species with powerful mental abilities, their natural form resembles a giant tentacled fish. Their home planet is Ul'lula, second from the sun in the Ul star system in the Milky Way. Nebulon and Supernalia are Ul'lula'ns.

==== Uncreated ====
The Uncreated, once called "the Works", are warlike and seek the extermination of all religions and religious species. Slightly larger and stronger than humans, they have claws and are covered with quills. Uncreated are capable of communicating with humans, but it is unclear whether this is through speech or some form of telepathy. The Uncreated claim that they did not evolve naturally, but were instead created by a powerful creature which they worshipped as a god.

==== Uranusians ====
The Uranusians are a wooden species.

==== Ursaa ====
The Ursaa are a race of scavengers. They would scavenge any downed spaceships and sell any survivors they find to the Chnitt.

=== V ===
==== Va-Shaak ====
The Va-Shaak are alien invaders that are also known as the Horde.

==== Vegans ====
The Vegans are a humanoid species that stands 30 feet (9.1 m) tall on average. Vegans continually radiate anti-gravitons from areas of their brains contained within two horn-like projections on the front of their skulls in order to support their vast bulk. Their home planet is Vega Superior, fourth from the sun in the Vega star system in the Milky Way.

==== Viscardi ====
The Viscardi are a species from the planet of the same name.

==== Voldi ====
The Voldi are a humanoid bird-like species witgh that have feathers instead of hair.

==== Vorms ====
The Vorms are a reptilian species with red scaled skin that averages 16 feet 6 inches (5.03 m) in height. Their home planet is Vormir, sixth from the sun in the Helgentar star system in the Kree galaxy (Greater Magellanic Cloud). Each Vorm has a long tail that can be used as a weapon. Vorms are nocturnal and are vulnerable to great heat.

==== Vrellnexians ====
The Vrellnexians are an insectoid species that usually has purple skin, and stands 5 feet 5 inches (1.65 m) on average. They come from the planet Vrellnex, fifth from the sun in the Cetsin star system in the Milky Way. They stand on their hindmost pair of limbs, and have two sets of arms. They differ widely in appearance; some are winged and can fly.

===== Vrellnexians in other media =====
The Vrellnexians appear in Agents of S.H.I.E.L.D.. This version of the species are quadrupedal and operate in packs.

=== W ===
==== Wilameanis ====
The Wilameanis are a humanoid species similar to humans, averaging 5 feet 4 inches (1.63 m) in height. They come from the planet Wilamean, fifth from the sun in the Yalnot star system in the Andromeda Galaxy.

==== Wobbs ====
The Wobbs are a semi-humanoid species that possess telepathic abilities enabling them to understand any auditory language and translate it telepathically to other nearby sentient organisms. They have light purple skin, and are 5 feet 1 inch (1.55 m) on average. Their homeworld is Wobb-Lar, second from the sun in the Filipima star system in the Andromeda Galaxy.

==== Wobbow ====
The Wobbow are a dangerous green species from the planet Draconius.

=== X ===
==== Xandarians ====
The Xandarians are a human-like species surviving on four conjoined asteroids, the only remains of their homeworld Xandar. They are founders of the Nova Corps.

===== Xandarians in other media =====
The Xandarians appear in the Marvel Cinematic Universe films Guardians of the Galaxy and Guardians of the Galaxy Vol. 2.

==== Xantareans ====
The Xantareans are a reptilian humanoid species with red scaled skin that stands 7 feet 5 inches (2.26 m) on average. They are amphibious. Their home planet is Xantar, second from the sun in the Xantares star system in the Milky Way.

==== Xantha ====
The Xantha are a semi-humanoid species with pale yellow skin that stands 4 feet 6 inches (1.37 m) on average. They originate from the planet Xanth, also known as Planet X, which was destroyed in a collision with a rogue asteroid. With the help of Mister Fantastic, the survivors established a new home planet of New Xanth in the New Jatskan star system.

===== Xantha in other media =====
The Xantha appear in the Fantastic Four episode "Prisoners of Planet X".

==== Xartans ====
The Xartans are a shapeshifting species capable of detailed duplication of living or non-living subjects. They come from the planet Xarta, fourth from the sun in the Zugano star system in the Fornax galaxy. In their true forms, Xartans have orange skin and average 6 feet 9 inches (2.06 m) in height.

==== Xem ====
The Xem are a furry white alien species. Xemnu is a Xem.

==== Xeronians ====
The Xeronians are a semi-humanoid species with orange skin that averages 6 feet 8 inches (2.03 m) in height. They come from the planet Xeron, second from the sun in the triple star system containing Aerim, Honj, and Verserin, in the Milky Way. Xeronians have five eyes, but use only two adjacent eyes at the same time.

==== Xixix ====
The Xixix are a semi-humanoid species with red skin that averages 5 feet 9 inches (1.75 m) in height. They come from the planet Xix, which was in the Xaravaran star system in the Milky Way until it was destroyed by Galactus.

==== Xorrians ====
The Xorrians are a humanoid species that allegedly spawned all humanoid life such as Kree, Skrulls, Shi'ar and humans over 6,000,000 years ago.

=== Y ===
==== Yirbek ====
The Yirbek are a humanoid reptilian species with green skin that averages 6 feet 7 inches (2.01 m) in height. Their home planet is Yirb, second from the sun in the Bek star system in the Andromeda galaxy. The Yirbeks governed a small empire in the Skrull galaxy until the Skrulls defeated them centuries ago.

==== Yrds ====
The Yrds are a semi-humanoid species with green skin that stands 6 feet 2 inches (1.88 m) on average. They come from the planet Yrest, third from the sun in the Corinum star system in the Draco galaxy. Each Yrd has a 1' long horn protruding from its forehead that can be used as a weapon.

=== Z ===
==== Z'Nox ====
The Z'Nox are a reptilian species with brown skin that averages 6 feet 1 inch (1.85 m) in height. They come from the planet Z'nox, second from the sun in the Huz'deyr star system in the Andromeda galaxy. They are ruled by a planetwide military dictatorship. They once attacked Earth, but were repelled by the X-Men; a later attack via biological warfare was repelled by Spider-Man during the Maximum Security storyline.

==== Zen-Whoberis ====
The Zen-Whoberis are a green-skinned humanoid species from the planet Zen-Whoberi that are also called the Zen-Whoberians. Gamora is a Zenn-Whoberian. The Zen-Whoberis, sans Gamora, were exterminated by the Universal Church of Truth.

==== Zenn-Lavians ====
The Zenn-Lavians are a human-like species, later described as a pacifistic offshoot of the Kree. Their home planet, Zenn-La, is third from the sun in the Deneb star system in the Milky Way. Silver Surfer and Shalla-Bal are Zenn-Lavians.

==== Zn'rx ====
The Zn'rx are a bipedal reptilian species with a digitigrade leg structure. They are intelligent and have interstellar travel technology. However, they are also a warlike race by tradition.

==== Zundamites ====
The Zundamites are a semi-humanoid species with pale yellow skin that stands 11 feet 8 inches (3.56 m) tall on average. Their home planet is Zundam. They have the ability to survive in virtually any environment without assistance.
