= Pantheon (Marvel Comics) =

Fictional organization in the Marvel Comics universe

Publication information
- Publisher: Marvel Comics
- First appearance: The Incredible Hulk vol. 2 #368 (April 1990)
- Created by: Peter David

In-story information
- Base(s): The Mount
- Member(s): Agamemnon; Ajax; Andromeda; Atalanta; Cassiopea; Delphi; Hector; Jason; Paris; Prometheus; Ulysses (Charles)

Pantheon is a fictional organization appearing in American comic books published by Marvel Comics. Created by writer Peter David, the Pantheon first appeared in The Incredible Hulk vol. 2 #368 (April 1990), and was a large part of that book's supporting cast from issue #379 (March 1991) to issue #426 (February 1995).

== Fictional history ==
Agamemnon, a half-human and half-Asgardian god, was born immortal and does not physically age beyond the age of 16. All members of the Pantheon are his descendants. Stationed in the Nevada desert based headquarters called The Mount, the Pantheon recruit the Hulk, who seeks to repent for his past actions. The Hulk works with the Pantheon on many rescue and relief missions, the focus of the Pantheon's purpose. In return, several members help the Hulk out with personal missions, which sometimes dovetail into the Pantheon's intended purposes.

For a while, the Hulk leads the Pantheon. Together, they endure attacks by the U-Foes, confrontations with X-Factor and a vast space chase when one of the members is kidnapped by a lovesick alien prince. This eventually leads to a confrontation with Agammemnon, who attempts to ensure the long-term survival of his children — none of whom inherited his immortality — by offering the Troyjans the pick of his descendants in exchange for technology to extend their lifespan.

As Agamemnon raises an army of deceased Pantheon members, the Hulk leads the rest of the team against their former leader in their final battle. The Mount is destroyed during a battle between the Pantheon and Agamemnon's cyborgs, the Endless Knights. Agamemnon and Achilles are slain during the battle. Ulysses leaves the group to find Delphi, who had left before the final battle. Paris wants nothing to do with the Hulk, but the rest of the team wants the Hulk to return. The Hulk refuses. Members of the team all have dense skin due to their Asgardian heritage, making them highly resistant to physical damage. They also possess superhuman strength, stamina and durability, a healing factor, and they do not age.

== Members ==
- Achilles (Helmut Halfling) - Achilles is invulnerable except when he is close to low-level gamma radiation. He is killed in a battle with Ulysses (Charles). He is the son of Agamemnon.
- Agamemnon (Vali Halfling) - Agamemnon is the founder and leader of the Pantheon. He is the son of Loki and an unknown mortal woman. He is the father of Achilles.
- Ajax - Ajax must wear an exoskeleton to support his massive frame.
- Andromeda - Andromeda has the ability to see the future. She is the mother of Delphi.
- Atalanta - Atalanta uses a bow and arrows that are made of plasma energy.
- Cassiopea - Cassiopea has the ability to absorb energy and return it in the form of concussive blasts. She is the daughter of Perseus.
- Delphi - Delphi has the ability to see the future. She is the daughter of Andromeda and Jason.
- Hector - Hector uses a mace made of plasma energy and has the ability to fly.
- Hulk (Robert Bruce Banner) - The Hulk is a human mutated by radiation. He has superhuman strength, speed, stamina and durability. He also has a healing factor, a resistance to mental control and the ability to see astral forms. He is a member of the Avengers and S.H.I.E.L.D.'s Secret Avengers.
- Jason - Jason the Renegade prefers to use guns as his weapon. He is the father of Delphi.
- Paris (Nathan Taylor) - Paris has empathic abilities.
- Perseus (Scott Shannon) - Perseus uses an energy spear. He is killed by Madman. He is the father of Cassiopea.
- Prometheus - Prometheus has a tracking sense that works over great distances, even across space.
- Ulysses - The original Ulysses uses a plasma shield and sword. He is killed by Achilles.
- Ulysses (Walter Charles) - Ulysses uses a plasma energy sword and shield.

== Powers and abilities ==
All Pantheon members are said to possess some measure of superhuman strength and recuperative abilities, and age considerably slower than normal humans.

== In other media ==
The Incredible Hulk: The Pantheon Saga is a video game loosely based on the Pantheon comic book storyline.
