= Hermes (Marvel Comics) =

Fictional character in Marvel Comics

Publication information
- Publisher: Marvel Comics
- First appearance: Thor #129 (June 1966)
- Created by: Stan Lee; Jack Kirby

In-story information
- Alter ego: Hermes
- Team affiliations: Olympian Gods
- Notable aliases: Mercury, Cyllenius
- Abilities: Superhuman strength, durability, stamina, agility, and reflexes Run and fly at godly speeds Immortality; Immunity to all terrestrial diseases Extraordinary hand-to-hand combatant Expert thief Skilled musician Adept at any pursuit

Hermes is a fictional character appearing in American comic books published by Marvel Comics. Hermes is the Olympian God of transitions and boundaries in Greek religion and mythology. Hermes first appeared in Thor #129 and was adapted by Stan Lee and Jack Kirby.

== Fictional character biography ==
Hermes is the herald of Zeus in the Olympian pantheon, and is also the god of commerce, travel, and thieves. Zeus is Hermes's father. Hermes was born to the nymph Maia on Mount Cyllene, Arcadia, in ancient Greece.

When Hermes first appeared, he was seen departing Olympus on an unknown mission. Alongside his fellow Olympians, he attacked the Eternals at the behest of Zeus and Odin. During this fight, Hermes battled Makkari. Hermes's role as the messenger of the goddesses involved in the creation of the Young Gods was later revealed. He was also present when Zeus granted power to Thor to help resurrect the Asgardian gods. Hermes next appointed Jules Keene the god of luck.

When Hercules was gravely wounded fighting the Masters of Evil, Hermes abducted the injured Hercules from the New York hospital he was admitted to. Zeus blamed the Avengers for Hercules's condition, and ordered the Olympians to attack the Avengers. Hermes battled the Avengers at Zeus's behest, but was then forbidden to set foot on Earth by Zeus. Some time later, Hermes brought Cupid a message from Venus. Later Hermes brought a message to Ares to try to convince him to return to Olympus during the attack by the Japanese God of Evil Amatsu-Mikaboshi.

Following the Fear Itself storyline, Hermes comes in on Zeus (who is in the form of Storm in his latest mating with mortal women) telling him that Hercules had broken into Ares' weapons stockade and taken some of the weapons there.

== Powers and abilities ==
Hermes possesses the typical powers of an Olympian; superhuman strength, durability, stamina, agility, and reflexes. He is immortal as well as resistant to all terrestrial diseases. Hermes can run and fly at speeds exceeding those of any other Olympian god or goddess.

Hermes excels at hand-to-hand combat, wrestling particularly. Hermes is also a thief, musician, and adept at any pursuit involving swiftness and dexterity.

Hermes is usually armed with a short sword, forged by Hephaestus.

== Reception ==
- In 2018, CBR.com ranked Hermes 18th in their "25 Fastest Characters In The Marvel Universe" list.
- In 2022, Screen Rant included Hermes in their "10 Most Powerful Olympian Gods In Marvel Comics" list.
- In 2022, CBR.com ranked Hermes 2nd in their "Marvel: The 20 Fastest Speedsters" list.
