= Bron-Char =

Publication information
- Publisher: Marvel Comics
- First appearance: Avengers #364 (July 1993)
- Created by: Mark Waid; Joe Kubert

In-story information
- Species: Kree
- Team affiliations: Lunatic Legion

Bron-Char is a fictional character appearing in American comic books published by Marvel Comics. Created by writer Mark Waid and artist Joe Kubert, the character debuted in Avengers #364 (July 1993). He was a member of the Lunatic Legion. He destroyed one of Captain America's shields.

The character was portrayed by Rune Temte in the Marvel Cinematic Universe film Captain Marvel (2019).

== Publication history ==
The character first appeared in Avengers #364 (July 1993), and was created by writer Mark Waid and artist Joe Kubert. He was introduced as part of the Lunatic Legion during the "Live Kree or Die" story arc.

== Fictional character biography ==
Bron Char was with the second lineup of the Lunatic Legion led by Galen-Kor when they attacked the Cape Canaveral base, and he ambushed Captain America and smashed the triangular shield that he was carrying at the time. He battered Captain America initially, but when Captain America saw how many people the Kree had been experimenting on, he became furious and beat Bron-Char badly.

== Powers and abilities ==
Bron-Char has considerable strength for a Kree.

== In other media ==
Bron-Char appears in Captain Marvel, portrayed by Rune Temte. This version is an expert in hand-to-hand combat and is a member of Starforce alongside Yon-Rogg, Carol Danvers (then known as "Vers"), Att-Lass, Minn-Erva, and Korath. While on a mission to the planet Torfa to rescue a Kree scout, Starforce is ambushed by a group of Skrulls, who capture Danvers. After she escapes and crash-lands on Earth, Starforce head there to rescue her. However, as Danvers had discovered the truth of the Kree's war with the Skrulls and her true identity, she fights her former team and subdues Bron-Char.
