= Korath the Pursuer =

Fictional character appearing in American comic books published by Marvel Comics

Publication information
- Publisher: Marvel Comics
- First appearance: Quasar #32 (March 1992)
- Created by: Mark Gruenwald; Greg Capullo

In-story information
- Alter ego: Korath-Thak
- Species: Kree
- Team affiliations: Starforce
- Abilities: Cyber-genetic engineering Superhuman strength, stamina, and durability Psionic tracking

Korath the Pursuer (/ˈkɔːræθ/; full name: Korath-Thak) is a fictional character appearing in American comic books published by Marvel Comics. Korath was a geneticist, who founded and led the Pursuer Project. He also was a member of the Starforce.

Djimon Hounsou portrays Korath in the Marvel Cinematic Universe films Guardians of the Galaxy (2014), Captain Marvel (2019), and the Disney+ series What If...? (2021).

== Publication history ==
Korath first appeared in Quasar #32 (March 1992), and was created by Mark Gruenwald and Greg Capullo. Korath was the lead designer of the project that created the Pursuer, a cockroach modified by Kree geneticists. The Pursuer first appeared in The Inhumans #11 (June 1977), fifteen years before Korath's debut.

He was a member of the Starforce team during the Operation Galactic Storm storyline. He turned the experiments on himself and it gave him superpowers, including the ability to follow the brainwaves of his targets. He later reunited with his old team mate Ronan the Accuser, as part of the Annihilation event.

== Fictional character biography ==
Korath-Thak is an agent of the Kree empire. He was a cyber-geneticist, and the founder and head of the Pursuer Project to develop cybernetic warriors for the Kree militia. He has also been a munitions manufacturing plant foreman, and a special operative of the Supreme Intelligence.

Korath uses cyber-genetic technology of his own design to gain superhuman powers during the Kree/Shi'ar War. At the behest of the Supreme Intelligence, he attacks the Avengers on Hala.

With Starforce, Korath arrives in the Shi'ar empire to assassinate Lilandra Neramani. He battles another contingent of Avengers and the Shi'ar Imperial Guard. He returns to Hala alongside Lilandra, Starforce, and the Imperial Guard after the detonation of the Nega-Bomb, which kills most of the Kree.

Korath settles on the planet Godthab Omega, which is visited by Ronan during his search for Tana Nile. Korath is later assimilated into the Phalanx and becomes one of their Select. He battles Quasar, Moondragon, and Adam Warlock and is killed by Ultron after failing to capture Warlock.

== Powers and abilities ==
Korath is a member of the alien Kree race, who was augmented by an unknown experimental cyber-genetic engineering process. He has superhuman physical abilities and can psionically track others by tracing their brain patterns. Like other Kree, Korath cannot breathe in Earth's atmosphere without a special apparatus or breathing serum.

Korath is an expert in cyber-genetic engineering. He is trained in the martial skills of the ancient Kree, and is a competent armed and unarmed combatant.

Korath wears an armored battle-suit and helmet composed of unknown alien materials. He wields two beta-batons which generate electrical force capable of stunning opponents into unconsciousness on contact or disrupting electrical devices. By adjusting the batons, Korath can stun beings as powerful as Eternals or even intangible beings. He is capable of flight via electrically powered turbines in his boots.

== In other media ==
=== Marvel Cinematic Universe ===
Djimon Hounsou portrays Korath in media set in the Marvel Cinematic Universe (MCU).

- Korath first appears in Guardians of the Galaxy (2014). This version is a subordinate of Ronan the Accuser. Korath assists Ronan in his siege on the planet Xandar and battles the Guardians of the Galaxy when they attempt to foil Ronan's plans, only to be killed by Drax the Destroyer.
- A young Korath appears in Captain Marvel (2019) as a member of Starforce.
- Hounsou voices an alternate timeline version of Korath in the What If...? episode "What If... T'Challa Became a Star-Lord?" (2021). This version is a member of T'Challa's Ravagers.

=== Television ===
Korath, based on the MCU incarnation, appears in Guardians of the Galaxy (2015), voiced by Dave Fennoy. This version was raised by Thanos.

=== Video games ===
- Korath appears as a playable character in Avengers in Galactic Storm.
- Korath appears in Marvel: Avengers Alliance 2.
