= Captain Atlas =

Fictional character

Publication information
- Publisher: Marvel Comics
- First appearance: Quasar #9 (April 1990)
- Created by: Mark Gruenwald; Mike Manley

In-story information
- Alter ego: Att-Lass
- Species: Kree
- Team affiliations: Starforce
- Notable aliases: Mr. Atlas; Titanium Man
- Abilities: Superhuman strength and durability; Flight

Captain Atlas (Att-Lass) is a character appearing in American comic books published by Marvel Comics. Created by writer Mark Gruenwald and artist Mike Manley, the character first appeared in Quasar #9 (April 1990). Captain Atlas was introduced as the partner of Doctor Minerva. He became later a member of the Kree superteam Starforce. The character was also known as Titanium Man at various points in his history.

Algenis Perez Soto portrays Atlas in the Marvel Cinematic Universe film Captain Marvel (2019).

== Publication history ==
Captain Atlas first appeared in Quasar #9 (April 1990), and was created by writer Mark Gruenwald and artist Mike Manley. He was introduced as the new lover of Doctor Minerva, she had empowered herself and At-lass.

He reappeared as a member of the Starforce team alongside Minerva, Ronan the Accuser, Supremor, Ultimus, Korath the Pursuer and Shatterax, created by the Supreme Intelligence. The team was active during the Operation: Galactic Storm event, tasked with defending the Kree empire from superpowered threats.

He briefly made a return during the Infinity event in as part of Spymaster's team. He had a new code name called Titanium Man.

== Fictional character biography ==
Att-Lass, a native of the planet Kree-Lar, throne-world of the Kree empire, graduates from the Kree Military Academy to become a Captain in the Kree space fleet. He is given command of the Kree light cruiser Ramatam. He also becomes a warrior and special operative for the Supreme Intelligence.

Taking the alias Mr. Atlas, he accompanies Doctor Minerva to an A.I.M. Weapons Exposition. He helps Minerva capture Quasar to obtain his quantum bands. He is later rescued by Quasar, but the hero forces him to leave Earth.

Atlas and Minerva explore Captain Marvel's tomb on one of Saturn's moons, looking for his nega-bands. Atlas is captured by Quasar again and attacked by Shi'ar Imperial Guard members, representatives of a galaxy spanning avian race. Atlas still manages to obtain Mar-Vell's nega-bands. Atlas then battles Wonder Man on Earth, and is captured by him. He is freed by a member of the Guard posing as Minerva, then captured by the rest of the Imperial Guard. The Shi'ar strip Atlas of the nega-bands.

Atlas then joins the Kree Starforce and battles the Avengers on Kree-Lar. He survives the genocidal 'Nega-Bomb', which nearly wipes out Kree society. He then apparently commits suicide via his battle-suit's self-destruct program, but survives and goes into hiding with Minerva.

During the Infinity storyline, the Kree send Captain Atlas to Earth, where he poses as Titanium Man and gathers Blizzard, Constrictor, Firebrand, Spymaster, Unicorn, Whiplash, and Whirlwind to join him in a heist on Stark Tower. After a quick skirmish, Captain Atlas teleports his "teammates" back to his ship, where he reveals his true identity. Iron Man eventually tracks down the villains and helps Blizzard, Constrictor, Firebrand, Unicorn, Whiplash, and Whirlwind fight Captain Atlas and Spymaster upon the two double-crossing the other villains. Captain Atlas attempts to kill Iron Man, but is killed by Unicorn.

== Powers and abilities ==
As a Kree, Captain Atlas possesses superhuman physical abilities, which are enhanced by the Kree Psyche-Magnetron. He is a skilled combatant, proficient in various forms of armed and unarmed combat. Additionally, Atlas wields Uni-Beams that project concussive energy beams.

== Other versions ==
=== Marvel Zombies ===
A zombified alternate universe version of Captain Atlas appears in Ultimate Fantastic Four #23.

=== House of M ===
An alternate universe version of Captain Atlas appears in New Thunderbolts #11.

=== What If? ===
An alternate universe version of Captain Atlas appears in What If? #56.

=== Mini-Marvels ===
An alternate universe version of Captain Atlas appears in Spidey and the Mini-Marvels #1.

== In other media ==
- Att-Lass appears in Avengers in Galactic Storm.
- Att-Lass appears in Captain Marvel, portrayed by Algenis Perez Soto. This version is a member of Yon-Rogg's Starforce and wields twin pistols.
