= List of Inhumans =

The following is a list of known fictional characters who are Inhumans, a race of superhumans appearing in American comic books published by Marvel Comics.

== Known Inhumans ==
=== Inhuman Royal Family ===
The Inhuman Royal Family are the ruling class of the Inhumans. Members of the Inhuman Royal Family include:

- Black Bolt (Blackagar Boltagon) – King of the Inhumans and husband to Medusa. He has a destructive hypersonic voice capable of defeating other super-powered beings. He has undergone rigorous mental training to prevent himself from uttering a sound, even in sleep. A fork-like antenna on Black Bolt's forehead allows more controlled use of his voice and psychically connects him to Lockjaw.
- Medusa (Medusalith Amaquelin Boltagon) – Wife of Black Bolt and Queen of the Inhumans. She is also a former member of the Fantastic Four and the Frightful Four, as well as mother of Ahura and older sister of Crystal. Her prehensile hair possesses super-strength.
- Crystal (Crystallia Amaquelin Maximoff) – Medusa's sister, ex-wife of Quicksilver and mother of Luna. She is a former member of the Fantastic Four, and a former member of the Avengers. She can manipulate Earth, Air, Fire and Water.
- Gorgon (Gorgon Petragon) – Cousin of Medusa. He has bull-like legs which are capable of creating shockwaves like an earthquake.
- Karnak the Shatterer (Karnak Mander-Azur) – Cousin of Black Bolt. He is a priest and philosopher and chose not to expose himself to the terrigen mists (a substance that grants the Inhumans their powers on contact). He has the ability to sense an opponent's weak points and is a superb martial artist.
- Triton (Triton Mander-Azur) – Karnak's fish-like brother who can breathe underwater and survive the pressures of the deep sea.
- Maximus Boltagon – Also known as Maximus the Mad, he is Black Bolt's younger brother, and attempts to overthrow him numerous times. Maximus has the ability of mind-control.
- The Unspoken – Cousin of Black Bolt. He was once the King of the Inhumans until the rest of the Royal Family rose up against him. Black Bolt banished him, decreeing that his actions would be removed from the history books and his name never be uttered again causing him to be referred to as "The Unspoken". The Terrigen Mists gave him the power of "Terrigenesis," the ability to alter his body into any form he wished.
- Ahura Boltagon – Son of Medusa and Black Bolt. He has psychic abilities.
- Luna Maximoff - Daughter of Quicksilver and Crystal. Born human, but later mutated by her father with a terrigen crystal.
- Lockjaw – A large bulldog who was granted the power of teleportation after exposure to the terrigen mists. This was due to the Inhumans' experiment on canines.

=== Inhuman Royal Guards ===
The Inhuman Royal Guards are a group of Inhumans who are responsible for protecting the Inhuman Royal Family. Among its members are:

- Chynae – A hydrokinetic Inhuman with pointed ears and gills.
- Dinu – A teenage Inhuman who was disfigured during Terrigenesis, leading him to wear a mask. It is rumored that Terrigenesis has disfigured Dinu so much that simply looking upon his face can cause death.
- Drive – An Inhuman with super-speed.
- Naanis – A tree-like Inhuman and the twin brother of Timberius.
- Neifi – An Inhuman with gray skin and reptilian features. He possesses super-strength and durability and his skin is like armor.
- Tonaja – An Inhuman with green scaly skin and extendable brown wings.

=== Genetic Council ===
The Genetic Council is a group of Inhumans charged with making decisions on the use of the Terrigen Mists and the fate of the Inhumans. Among the known members are:

- Arkadine Arcadius – An Inhuman chancellor who has the ability to animate and speak through statues.
- Avia – A female Inhuman with bird-like wings.
- Carthus – A religious leader and spiritual adviser. He was blue with several red spiked horns on his head.
- Cynas – A female one-eyed golden Inhuman.
- Furgar – A reptilian council member.
- Kitang – Member of council who was deposed after his several attempts to kidnap Ahura.
- Porcal – A council member with quill-like growths.
- Sapphiras – A golden female Inhuman.
- Targon – A beastly Inhuman.
- Thernon – A council member.

=== Inhuman allies of Maximus ===
The following Inhumans are allies of Maximus:

- Aireo – An Inhuman who can manipulate air. Member of Force of Nature as Skybreaker. Later a member of the Initiative team stationed in Oregon.
- Falcona – An Inhuman who can control birds of prey.
- Leonus – An Inhuman with lion-like attributes.
- Nebulo – An invisible Inhuman also known as the Shadow Uncast due to his shadow being visible in the light.
- Seeker – Worked for Maximus during his reign of Attilan. Killed in Inhumans: Untold Stories #6.
- Stallior – A centaur-like Inhuman.
- Timberius – A tree-like Inhuman who can control plants.

=== Crimson Cadre ===
The Crimson Cadre are the Inhumans' personal strike force led by General Ator. Among its members are:

- General Ator – Leader of the Crimson Cadre. His current status and whereabouts are unknown.
- Eelak the Agile – An Inhuman with enhanced agility. He later appeared as a member of the Inhuman Royal Guard with a different appearance.
- Margoyle – A gargoyle-like Inhuman. His current status and whereabouts are unknown.
- Pulssus – An electrical Inhuman. His current status and whereabouts are unknown.
- Rootar – A bark-skinned Inhuman. His current status and whereabouts are unknown.

=== Dark Riders ===
The Dark Riders are a group of Mutants and Inhumans drafted by Apocalypse. Among its Inhuman members are:

- Barrage – Founding member of the Dark Riders. He can transform his arms into organic weapons that can absorb energy and fire it in powerful explosive blasts. He was killed by a clone of Madelyne Pryor. Returned with the group to hunt mutant healers, and was killed by Magneto.
- Foxbat – Founding member of the Dark Riders who can see in the dark and use his fangs and claws as weapons. He was assassinated by Genesis.
- Gauntlet – Founding member of the Dark Riders who later became a mercenary for hire.Returned with the group to hunt mutant healers, and was killed by Magneto.
- Hard-Drive – Founding member of the Dark Riders who can teleport and control machinery. At some point, he was turned into a cyborg. Returned with the group to hunt mutant healers, and was killed by Magneto.
- Psynapse – Founding member of the Dark Riders and the cousin of Medusa and Crystal. He had telepathy. Killed by the other members of the team, but was revealed to be alive only to be incinerated by the energy released when he attempted to tap into the powers of X-Man. Returned with the group to hunt mutant healers, and was killed by Magneto.
- Tusk – Founding member of the Dark RidersReturned with the group to hunt mutant healers, and was killed by Magneto.

=== New Generation Inhumans ===
- Alaris – An Inhuman and member of the Inhuman Royal Guard with enhanced strength and bulletproof skin. He was sent to Earth as part of a reconnaissance mission/student exchange program.
- Jolen – A vegetation-manipulating Inhuman who was sent to Earth.
- Nahrees – An Inhuman who can generate electricity.
- San – An Inhuman who can sculpt objects out of organic clay.

=== Universal Inhumans ===
The Inhumans and the Kree experimented on Centaurians, Dire Wraiths, Kymellians, and Badoon so that when Black Bolt is found, he can lead them into a new era. Besides the Inhuman Royal Family, among the members of the Universal Inhumans are:

- Aladi Ko Eke – The current Queen of the Badoons.
- Arris – A Centaurian who was an adviser to Queen Oola.
- Avoe – The current Queen of the Dire Wraiths.
- Dal Damoc – An Inhuman with levitation abilities who is a member of the Universal Inhumans. He remained on Attilan to watch over it while the Inhuman Royal Family left to rule the Kree Empire. He became a herald of a new age when the Universal Inhumans returned.
- Onomi Whitemane – The current Queen of the Kymellians.
- Oola Udonta – The current Queen of the Centaurians.

==== Light Brigade ====
A special team of Universal Inhumans who rescued Human Torch from Annihilus. Among the members of the Light Brigade are:

- Dara Ko Eke – A Badoon. She operates under the alias of All-Knowing.
- Els Udonta – A Centaurian archer. She operates under the alias of Stonethrower.
- Hooud – A size-shifting Dire Wraith. He operates under the alias of Creeping Death.
- Kal Blackbane – A Kymellian swordsman. He operates under the alias of Midnight Blade.
- Prax Ord – A Centaurian with metal skin who operates under the alias of Metallic Titan.
- Voorr – A Dire Wraith who can fly and project force fields. He operates under the alias of Sun.

=== Other Inhumans ===
Unless stated otherwise, it can be assumed that the listed Inhumans are residing in Attilan. Among the Inhumans listed here are:

- Aeric – Last seen as a child.
- Agon – Father of Black Bolt, son of Symak, and husband of Rynda. He was elected head of the Inhumans Genetic Council circa 1870. He was killed when Black Bolt used his sonic powers to stop an escaping Kree ship which had crashed into the laboratory in which he was working.
- Albakor – An Inhuman scientist, soldier, and member of the New Inhuman Elite with an aquatic physiology and is an expert in technology. He has great mobility in the oceans and zero gravity.
- Alecto – An Inhuman with leathery wings who is the daughter of Gorgon, the half-sister of Petras, and the former lover of the Alpha Primitive Reyno.
- Ambur – An Inhuman who is the wife of Quelin and mother of Medusa and Crystal.
- Andvari – An engineer who designed the technology to relocate Attilan from the ocean to the Himalayan mountains.
- Arvak – A centaur-like Inhuman who works as a soldier.
- Asmodeus – An Inhuman who has green bat-like wings and works as a guardsman.
- Auran – Has yellow skin and large ears, and the ability to hear anyone if she picks a word and knows their location. She is an inspector in New Attilan and good friends with the NuHuman Frank McGee (who she calls Nur). Auran is killed in an explosion caused by Maximus, but her daughters convince Reader to use his abilities to "resurrect" her, creating a duplicate Auran.
- Aven – An Inhuman who was the former holder of the Royal Scepter inside the Inhuman Treasury.
- Avian – Last seen as a child.
- Avion – A child who was killed.
- Avius – A winged Inhuman who works as a guardsman.
- Azur
- Banth – An Inhuman who briefly romanced Dazzler while she was in Attilan.
- Belial Toiven – Mother of Rexel Toiven and wife of Usurieus. She has telepathic powers.
- Blaast – An Inhuman Guardsman who worked under Krush. He can fire energy blasts from his hands.
- Bochek
- Budan
- Burron – A reptilian Inhuman who fought High Evolutionary's Eliminators and Gatherers. Although he has not demonstrated any powers, Burron was an expert at armed combat.
- Capo – An Inhuman who lives only as an astral entity, possessing bodies as a parasite to sustain his life. He is the longtime head of the Ennilux Corporation.
- Centaurius
- Chiron – A centaur-like Inhuman and guardsman. He is the brother of Stallior.
- Corporus
- Cteno – An aquatic Inhuman.
- Cuidador – A green-skinned Inhuman doctor.
- Cyra
- Dendrok
- Desidera – A female Inhuman who works as a Finder. She possesses the ability to create a three dimensional image of Earth and can pull up specific location images by using other characters' mental connections to the item being looked for.
- Devlor – An Inhuman who became a member of Fantastic Force. He can transform into a beast-like creature with super-strength and enhanced agility. Current whereabouts and status are unknown.
- Dewoz – An Inhuman who can pass through reflective surfaces into what he called the "Antiverse." He was transformed into a duplicate of an Alpha Primitive by Terrigenesis.
- Diné – A young Inhuman.
- Dominus
- Dorhun – Member of the New Inhuman Elite. He has aquatic traits and was trained as a warrior to battle in zero-gravity combat.
- Dren
- Eldrac – An Inhuman who became a large head-shaped construct through Terrigenesis. He can teleport Inhumans who enter his mouth to any location.
- Elejea – An Inhuman with blue-green skin and spikes on various areas of the face who is a member of the Inhumans' diplomatic delegation to the United Nations and served under Ambassador Mendicus.
- Entos
- Ertzia – A long-lived 5 ft. 3 in. Inhuman with the ability to generate small and virtually impenetrable red containment shells who was a former advisor to Black Bolt. After Black Bolt launched Attilan to the Moon, Ertzia was left behind and later ended up in Ryker's Island.
- Felor – A cat-like Inhuman and servant to the Genetic Council.
- Flagman – An Inhuman who worked as a host in the Quiet Room.
- Flaidermaus – A flying furry Inhuman guardsman with a lion-like mane, claws, and bat-like wings.
- Flurgron
- Frag – A reptilian Inhuman who the Genetic Council wanted Tally to marry.
- Galen
- Ghaidor
- Gitel
- Glytra – An Inhuman who can fly.
- Goran
- Goran Malidicta – An Inhuman who guarded the cavern that contained the Terrigen Crystals, alongside his unnamed brothers. He was killed by Quicksilver.
- Gordon – An Inhuman who was created for the television series Agents of S.H.I.E.L.D. He was later integrated into the comics continuity.
- Grimal
- Ikarys – An Inhuman with bird-like wings. He serves as the Inhumans' scout and sentry.
- Ikelli – An Inhuman with blue tendrils from the Inhuman city of Utolan and brother of Flint.
- Iridia – An Inhuman with butterfly wings.
- Itar
- Jiaying – A green-skinned Inhuman with gills instead of a nose who knows Quake.
- Kalden – An ancient Inhuman king who was mentioned to have been responsible for exiling Gordon and Snarkle to another dimension 2,000 years ago for an unspecified crime.
- Kaliban – An Inhuman guardsman and brother of Yeti who took part in the attack on the Fantastic Four during an event in the Bronx. Like his brother, he resembles a Yeti.
- Kalikya – An Inhuman healer with elongated hands and fingers.
- Kirren – An amphibian/reptilian Inhuman guard. He was killed by Outrider.
- Kobar
- Korath
- Krush – An 8 ft. Inhuman guardsman who can grow to twice his size with amber-hued skin and super-strength.
- Kurani – An Inhuman illusion caster.
- Kylus – An Inhuman who lived in 500 B.C.
- La:
- Lash – An Inhuman with energy conversion ability who comes from the Inhuman city of Orrolan.
- Maelstrom – An energy-manipulating Inhuman who is the son of Phaeder and a Deviant.
- Magnar – An Inhuman.
- Mala – An Inhuman diviner who can communicate telepathically and hack electronic systems from long distances.
- Makoth
- Makus
- Mander
- Marak
- Marilla – An Inhuman with a bulky head, three toes on each foot, and spots on her body who was the nanny of Crystal (when she was young) and Luna. She was killed by a brainwashed Iron Man.
- Marishi Spin – The chief technology officer of the Ennilux. When he gathered together the company to elect their new C.E.O. following the Capo's demise, he also planned to unveil a new piece of technology called the antigen, an inhibitor of Inhuman abilities. However, the device was stolen by Fantomelle before the presentation.
- Marista – An Inhuman who served as a royal attendant of Medusa.
- Maternal Council of Elders – A group of Inhumans who are the governing group of the Inhuman city of Utolan.
  - Daya – A member of Utolan's Maternal Council of Elders.
  - Irellis – A member of Utolan's Maternal Council of Elders, and mother of Flint and Ikelli.
- Maya – An Inhuman who is the former nanny of Luna. She can create artificial environments.
- Mendicus – An Inhuman ambassador with a childlike body who represents Attilan at the United Nations.
- Mikon
- Milena
- Minxi – An Inhuman peasant and attendant to Medusa who can duplicate the main traits and abilities of an animal for a short time. She helped Medusa to give birth to Ahura. Gorgon and Karnak each developed a crush on her.
- Mojlor – An Inhuman who Tally wanted to marry.
- Mullox
- Nadar – An Inhuman scientist and geneticist who once helped Mister Fantastic find a cure for the Hydro-Men.
- Nallo – An Inhuman musician who plays beautiful music on the strings on his arms.
- Nestor – An Inhuman who lived in 500 B.C. as the former ruler of the Inhumans.
- Nollik – Mother of Aeric.
- Oracle – A telepathic Inhuman who serves as Black Bolt's oracle and interpreter.
- Ozel – An Inhuman commoner who plotted to catch Quicksilver after he was suspected of stealing the Royal Spectre.
- Payne – An Inhuman guardsman who charges his fists with energy that magnifies his punches.
- Petras – Son of Gorgon and younger half-brother of Alecto. During Thanos' invasion, Gorgon had him undergo Terrigenesis which gave him the appearance of a green-furred Minotaur.
- Phadros
- Phaeder – An Inhuman geneticist who was exiled from Attilan and lived with Deviants for some time. He is the father of Maelstrom. Phaedar was the one who gave the High Evolutionary the papers containing blueprints for cracking the genetic code. Deceased.
- Pinyon
- Piskas
- Puppy – An Inhuman puppy who can teleport.
- Putor
- Quelin – Father of Medusa and Crystal and brother of Rynda.
- Radiant – An Inhuman who has immortal skin and super strength.
- Rajar
- Ramus
- Randac – The former ruler of the Inhumans and founder of the terrigen mists. Killed in Thor #147.
- Ransak the Reject – Son of Maelstrom and a Deviant.
- Reader – Reader was a part of the Lor Tribe of Inhumans who settled in Orollan, Greenland. When exposed to the Terrigen Mists, he developed the ability to make anything he reads become real and come to life. Reader's people feared the power he possessed and put out his eyes. Since then, Reader has learned to access his power in limited ways using braille cards.
- Rexel Toiven – An Inhuman tattoo artist with a weak third arm. He was killed by Portuguese mercenaries.
- Rok – An Inhuman guardsman who worked under Krush. He did not demonstrate any powers, but was an expert at armed combat.
- Romeo - An Inhuman with the power of empathy. He becomes briefly romantically involved with a young time-displaced Iceman.
- Romnar – An Inhuman scientist and researcher.
- Rynda – Mother of Black Bolt, sister of Quelin, and wife of Agon.
- Sanara – An Inhuman from the Inhuman city of Utolan.
- Seeker – The twin brother of the original Seeker.
- Senschi – A purple-skinned Inhuman with a taloned face, a spiky-finned ridge of hair, bat-like wings in place of arms, and a long spiked tail. He is the Inhuman Royal Family's royal page.
- Sisko – A female member of a species of Inhumans called "The Hidden Ones" who were once kidnapped by Nazis. She has the ability to shapeshift.
- Smilo
- Snarkle – An unspecified monstrous Inhuman who was exiled with Gordon to another dimension by King Kalden 2,000 years ago for an unspecified crime. Snarkle made it back to Earth, while Gordon remained in exile, and he was defeated by Flint and Iso and remanded to New Attilan's dungeon.
- Somnus – An Inhuman who can create small black ball projectiles which cause anyone who is hit by them to either see visions or fall asleep.
- Sporr – An Inhuman with the ability to duplicate itself by binary fission.
- Sylk – A female Inhuman guardsman who worked under Krush. She has a ribbon-like lower body.
- Symak
- Tally – An Inhuman who the Genetics Council wanted Frag to marry instead of Mojlor. She committed suicide.
- Tanith
- Tauron
- Telv
- Tethys
- Thera
- Thraxton
- Tolos – A bear-like Inhuman guard with superhuman strength. He was killed by Outrider.
- Ultarnt – An Inhuman scientist who did research on the ritual of terrigenesis.
- Usurieus Toiven
- Vel
- Veritus – An Inhuman with the ability to tell if someone is telling the truth or lying.
- Videmus – A blind Inhuman and former member of the Genetic Council with tendril-like eyes that can attach to the forehead of others, allowing him to see their thoughts. He told Quicksilver where the Terrigen Mists are. Afterwards, Black Bolt sentenced him to life in solitary confinement and barred him from using his powers. Gorgon disagreed with this sentence.
- Vinatos – A tall Inhuman doctor with razor sharp nails and close friend to the Inhuman Royal Family, especially Medusa. He aids the Inhuman hybrids (dubbed NuHumans) after their Terrigenesis. Vinatos was killed by the Unspoken.
- Webelos
- Weebwow
- Yeti – An Inhuman who resembles a Yeti and brother of Kaliban.
- Zeta
- Zorvash

== Bird People ==
The Bird People are an offshoot of the Inhumans who developed bird-like wings and the occasional bat-like wings. The following are the known members of the Bird People:

- Cheiros - The bat-winged leader of the Bird People.
- Condor - A criminal member of the Bird People.
- King Aerivar VIII - The King of the Bird People in the 20th century.
- King Kylus - The first King of the Bird People with white bird-like wings.
- Red Raven (Dania) - The daughter of Red Raven.
- Vera - The wife of Red Raven. When the Terrigen cloud reached Aerie, she underwent Terrigenesis, gaining pink skin and a hooked nose.

== Inhuman Hybrids (NuHumans) ==
In the wake of Infinity, it is revealed that tribes of Inhumans have existed in secret around Earth and that they had mated with humans, many eventually finding their way into modern society, without knowing their past, producing Inhuman/human hybrids. Inhumanity deals with the aftermath of this revelation.

- Adam Roderick – A Nuhuman whom Karnak was tasked with retrieving after he had been captured by A.I.M.'s splinter group I.D.I.C. He was thought to have an enhanced immune system, but his real abilities actually stem from vocally projecting his beliefs into reality.
- Aero (Lei Ling) - A Chinese archeologist with wind manipulation abilities and a member of the Agents of Atlas and Tiger Division.
- Ajay Roy – An Indian celebrity actor who gained a monstrous plant-covered wooden form.
- Alice Taylor-Kedzierski – A housewife who possesses the power to transfer mass between objects.
- Blizzard (Donnie Gill) – An enemy of Iron Man, Blizzard was unexpectedly discovered to have Inhuman ancestry during Captain Atlas' heist on Stark Tower and gained the ability to manipulate electricity.
- Doris – An elderly widow who turned to attorney Matt Murdock for help after her bank foreclosed on her home. After being exposed to the Terrigen mists, she transformed into a squid-like creature with tentacles in place of arms. Doris attacks the Avengers A.I., but is convinced to stand down and leaves for parts unknown with Medusa.
- Exile – Victor Kohl was an Inhuman and one of the wielders of Mandarin's Black Light ring. He is killed by Arno Stark.
- Fiona – A bird-like Inhuman and former blogger who is the sister of Flynn. She was exposed to the Terrigen Mist while taking selfies and subsequently began blogging about her condition. While trying to commit suicide, she was rescued by members of the Avengers Academy and former members of the New X-Men. Fiona later joined the Avengers Academy.
- Flint (Jason) – A teenage African-American Inhuman with the ability to control rocks and stone. He is later revealed to the long-lost son of Irellis.
- Flynn – Fiona's brother. Has super-strength, enhanced durability, and great leaping skills. He lashes out against everyone that wrongs him, but was talked down by Fiona and the Avengers Academy students.
- Fulmina (Sylvia Prell) – A college student from New York City who manifested her Inhuman powers during Thanos' invasion of Earth. She possesses the ability to transform herself into an organism of pure electricity. Fulmina was discovered by Superior Spider-Man (Doctor Octopus' mind in Spider-Man's body).
- Fume – Daryl is a gas-controlling Inhuman who is a member of Lash's tribe.
- Geldhoff – A Latverian exchange student who can release powerful bursts of energy.
- Glorianna (Rhonda Fleming) – A mutation expert who was called in by Parker Industries to figure out the Terrigen Mists' effects on mutants, but she had Inhuman DNA and went through Terrigenesis. Her cocoon was stolen by Lash. Spider-Man 2099 chased Lash to save Rhonda. When she emerged, she teleported Lash away and declared that she would be Earth's new god. Spider-Man 2099 fought her until she accidentally hurt her girlfriend Jasmine. Glorianna then teleported herself into seclusion.
- Grid – Dinesh Deol is an engineer from India whose Terrigenesis allows him to view and manipulate the electromagnetic spectrum.
- Grove – An Inhuman who sided with Lash.
- Haechi – Mark Sim is a Korean American boy who can absorb energy and utilize it to transform into a draconian bull-like creature resembling his namesake.
- Hub the Living Engine – Hubartes Plutaris lost most of his body after Terrigenesis, with his head becoming a mechanical construct. Unable to communicate with the outside world, he was found by the Inhuman royal family and integrated into a thought-powered ship called the Royal Inhuman Vessel.
- Dante Pertuz – A Latino teen who can transform himself into a being of fire and brimstone. Since gaining his powers, Dante has gone by the superhero alias Inferno.
- Iron Cross (Carrie Gruler) – The "Iron Man of Germany" and the daughter of the original Iron Cross. Her Terrigenesis caused a molecular bonding ability that merged her with her armor.
- Iso (Xiaoyi Chen) – A young woman from a rural village in China. She has the ability to control the pressure around her.
- Jack Chain – An Inhuman on Lash's side who can manifest Darkforce chains.
- Janus Jardeen – An Inhuman who can be undetected by anyone with precognition. He was a former minion of Kingpin before his move to San Francisco caused him to temporarily work with Black Cat's Gang. Kingpin later regained his services when he found out that the human trafficking business that he and Man Mountain Marko were working for left him undetected by Ulysses' precognition.
- Junkman of Brooklyn (Gavrel Achtor) – A man who can telekinetically lift junk and toss them towards his opponents. He tried to get revenge on Sarah Garza for accidentally destroying his apartment complex, but was shot and killed by Nick Fury Jr.
- Kaboom (Adriana) – A teenage girl with electrical powers working for Lineage, and an enemy of Kamala Khan. Not knowing her full strength at the time, Kamala accidentally injure her, forcing her to wear a neck brace.
- Kamran – A family friend and former love interest of Kamala Khan's. When he activates his ability, his skin glows a shade of blue, and he can cause what he touches to explode. He is later revealed to be working for Lineage and Kamala defeats him on New Attilan.
- Kid Kaiju - Kei Kawade is an Inhuman with the ability to summon and create monsters through his drawings.
- Kraven the Hunter (Ana Kravinoff) – The daughter of Kraven the Hunter is revealed to be a NuHuman on her mother Sasha Kravinoff's side. She managed to avoid terrigensis, but is embarrassed by her Inhuman heritage and kills her aunts to prove herself worthy to her father. She then agrees to guide Flint and Gorgon to Africa to find the hidden Inhuman city of Utolan. She is betrayed by the Utolan council and then allows the Terrigen Cloud to envelop her. Her Inhuman form and abilities are yet to be revealed.
- Lineage (Gordon "Gordo" Nobili) - Before Terrigenesis, he was the patriarch of his struggling Maggia family. After Terrigenesis, he finds himself with purple skin, several massive spikes growing from his head, super-strength, and the ability to communicate with his ancestors and descendants. Soon after hatching, he loses his two sons (one to crossfire in a huge firefight and one by suicide) and vows vengeance on the Punisher.
- Living Dream (Thahn Ng) – Thahn is a Nuhuman who lived on the tiny nation of Sin-Cong. Many such individuals were hunted down and burned alive in their homes by command of the ruling dictator of the nation. As the Royal Inhuman diplomatic mission of Attilan approached his homeland aboard the R.I.V, he bombarded the crew with the memories of all the deceased Nuhumans who had been executed in a bid to push them towards his goal of revenge. He eventually ended up possessing the body of the deceased former Commissar of Sin-Cong.
- Meruda – A weather-controlling Inhuman who once went on a Satanic killing spree against members of Storm's mother tribe in Kenya.
- Moon Girl – Lunella Lafayette has the ability of neuralkinesis; being able to transfer her consciousness into Devil Dinosaur's body and vice versa.
- Michelle – A Ohio State University student whose Terrigenesis transformed her into a red-skinned beast with wings and a tail.
- Miss Mech – A girl who used a wheelchair from an early age and grew up watching kaiju and mecha films. When the Terrigen Cloud hit New York, she gained the ability to mentally create and control robots out of any mechanical parts within her range. She initially mistook Kid Kaiju and his friend Moon Girl as evil monster controllers, but they reconciled and became friends.
- Mother Bones – An Inhuman with bony protrusions who sided with Lash.
- Mosaic – An ex professional athlete transformed by Terrigenesis into a disembodied energy being capable of invading any host, accessing their memories and talents, and moving on without being detected.
- Ms. Marvel (Kamala Khan) – Kamala Khan is a shapeshifting 16-year-old Muslim of Pakistani descent from Jersey City. After realizing that her Inhuman abilities give her the means to emulate her idol Carol Danvers, Kamala takes up her hero's former identity as the new Ms. Marvel.
- Naja – A teenage Inhuman with green leopard skin, a long tail, and wings on her arms that give her the ability to fly. Naja also possesses invisibility and telescopic vision.
- Nocculus – An Inhuman on Lash's side who possesses a third eye that enables him to perform mind-control and power detection abilities.
- Nur (Frank McGee) – A middle-aged man who can generate bright, soothing light from his eyes. Before Terrigenesis, he was a New York police officer, but his wife became afraid of him after the change. Nur moved to New Attilan, where he became the head of city security.
- Panacea (Ash Minnick) – A newly emerged Inhuman from Sydney, Australia who can heal/restore biological organisms to their optimal health.
- Quake (Daisy Johnson) – Level 10 Agent and former director of S.H.I.E.L.D. Once thought to be a mutant, Johnson was revealed to be a latent Inhuman.
- Quickfire (Barbara McDevitt) – A former corporate spy who discovered the ability to slow down time around her targets, but only for one person at a time. After being revealed as an Inhuman, she was hired by the Cortex Corporation to infiltrate the ruins of Attilan.
- Raina – Raina was originally created for the television series Agents of S.H.I.E.L.D. She made a cameo appearance in Inhuman Annual #1.
- Randall Jessup – A S.H.I.E.L.D. scientist working with Bruce Banner whose Terrigenesis turned him into a rage-powered monster.
- Ren Kimura – A Japanese-American dancer who can conjure razor sharp metal ribbons from her fingertips. She joined the Fearless Defenders after being rescued from Thanos' forces.
- Richard Schlickeisen – He was Anya Corazon's social studies teacher when he underwent terrigenesis, and was found to be invisible to machines. His cocoon was stolen by A.I.M. and later sold to June Covington who later took his DNA.
- Sarah Garza – A former S.H.I.E.L.D. technician from Park Slope, Brooklyn, who suddenly found herself able to generate powerful explosions of energy. After being outfitted with a regulator suit, she was appointed to the Secret Avengers by Maria Hill. She quickly resigned from the Avengers unit after seeing how violent they were, and was placed in confinement until she could learn to control her powers and return to her old job.
- Sheath – An Inhuman on Lash's side with metal shards protruding from her body.
- Shredded Man (Ivan Guerrero) – A powerful Inhuman who can communicate with and control plant life on a global scale.
- Spark – A pyrokinetic Inhuman on Lash's side.
- Swain (Jovana) - A newly emerged Inhuman who became captain of Princess Crystal's main ship called the R.I.V. It was believed her only talent was a manifested tail. In truth, she is a powerful Empathic Beacon who can influence the mood of others via emotional dialog.
- Synapse (Emily Guerrero) – A young Inhuman and granddaughter of Shredded Man with telepathic powers who is a member of the Avengers Unity Division.
- Techno Golem (Tomoe) - A young Inhuman crime boss from Japan who can control, bond with and physically as well as mentally; assimilate with various forms of technology.
- Thane – The son of Thanos, Thane is an Inhuman-Eternal hybrid with the ability to instantly kill others or trap them in amber.
- Toro – The former sidekick of the original Human Torch as well as a founding member of both the Invaders and the Kid Commandos. He was previously thought to be a mutant, but was retroactively established to have Inhuman heritage.
- Uber Alles – A Neo-Nazi Inhuman who can create air vortexes. He sided with Lash following a fight with Iron Cross and the Invaders.
- Ulysses Cain – Ulysses Cain is an Ohio State University student whose Terrigenesis gave him the ability to forecast the future, leaving him at the centre of the second superhero civil war as Iron Man and Captain Marvel fight over how to use his abilities.

== Other version of Inhumans ==
=== Inhumans of Earth-691 ===
In an alternate future of the Marvel Universe inhabited by the Guardians of the Galaxy, some new Inhumans are present. Among these Inhumans are:

- Anemone – An Inhuman with paralyzing tentacles.
- Composite – An Inhuman bred by Loki who was the leader of the enslaved Inhumans. He has all the powers of Black Bolt, Medusa, Gorgon and Triton.
- Egressor – An Inhuman with psionic filtration.
- Exempler – An Inhuman who was a prototype experiment of Loki's, and is the "stepfather" of Composite. He has all the powers of Black Bolt, Medusa, Gorgon, and Triton.
- Imprint – An Inhuman bred by Loki with a dangerous touch.
- Phobia – An Inhuman bred by Loki who can create fear illusions.
- Stupor – An Inhuman bred by Loki who has the ability to reduce his opponents motor skills.
- Talon – A catlike Inhuman with claws, super-strength, and super-speed who is a member of the Guardians of the Galaxy.
- Wormhole – An Inhuman bred by Loki who can create wormholes.

=== Inhumans of Earth-1610 ===
- Densitor – Maximus' flunky who can presumably increase his strength, durability and mass, enough to become fireproof.
- Tri-Clops (Sapphire) – An Inhuman with clairvoyant vision (including the power to see the invisible) in her third eye.
- An unnamed Inhuman who can produce a swarm of insect-like flying creatures from his body.

== Marvel Cinematic Universe ==
=== Appearing in Marvel's Agents of S.H.I.E.L.D. ===
The Marvel Television series Agents of S.H.I.E.L.D. introduced many Inhumans which were created specifically for the show.

- Abby – A young Inhuman girl in the year 2091 with density manipulation. After being trained by Jemma Simmons and defeating Basha's champion codenamed Beast in the Lighthouse's arena, Abby was sold to Basha by Kasius.
- Alisha Whitley – An Inhuman loyal to Jiaying with the ability to create multiple clones of herself with a hive mind to control each one. She was defeated by Lincoln Campbell and Melinda May. Alisha was seen cooperating with S.H.I.E.L.D. in Season 3. One of her clones was killed by Lash. While swayed to Hive's side, Alisha is later killed by a Kree Reaper.
- Ben – An Inhuman telepath in the year 2091. After helping Daisy Johnson and Jemma Simmons cover up some information that he found out, Kasius had Sinara kill Ben.
- Charles Hinton – Father of Robin. A teacher who became homeless after Terrigenesis made it so anyone who touched him shared a vision of an impending death. Taken by Hydra and used by Hive. Hinton sacrificed his life to save Quake from Gideon Malick.
- Dwight Frye – An Inhuman with the ability to sense other Inhumans as he suffers severe pain and breaks into a rash when in close proximity. He assisted Lash in his campaign to slaughter other Inhumans until he was captured by the ATCU and murdered by Lash as a result.
- Ethan Johnston – A young Inhuman who was kidnapped and killed by Dr. List and his fellow Hydra scientists after many hours of experimentation.
- Eva Belyakov – A Russian Inhuman, gifted with super-strength, who went rogue after stealing an assortment of Terrigen Crystals from Afterlife which she used to trigger the Terrigenesis of her daughter Katya. She was killed by Melinda May after causing mayhem in Bahrain while being controlled by her daughter.
- Flint – An Inhuman living on the Lighthouse in the year 2091. After undergoing Terrigenesis, Flint develops geokinesis.
- General Androvich – A Russian man who is a former assassin and Minister of Defense who allied with Gideon Malick and Russian delegate Anton Petrov in a plot to eliminate Prime Minister Dimitri Olshenko. His Inhuman ability has him manifesting his shadow into a Darkforce-powered shadow being who can change its density at will. Androvich was later killed by Bobbi Morse.
- Gordon – Gordon is an eyeless Inhuman and the right-hand man of Jiaying. He has the ability to teleport himself from one area to another. Aside from himself, Gordon can also teleport others so long as he is making direct contact with them. When teleporting, Gordon can generate fields of reflective blue energy which are impervious to gunfire. Gordon was killed in a battle by Leo Fitz, Al MacKenzie, and Phil Coulson.
- Hive (Alveus) – An Inhuman who can inhabit the bodies of the dead and acquire their memories. Thousands of years ago, the Kree created it from a Mayan hunter to lead their Inhuman army. The Inhumans, fearing its power, banded together with humans to banish it to the planet Maveth. Hydra was founded in ancient times in an attempt to retrieve Hive. During a mission to rescue the Hive in mid-season 3, Grant Ward is killed by Phil Coulson while Will Daniels' body (inhabited by the Hive) is destroyed by Leo Fitz. The Hive takes over Ward's body and escapes to Earth. Hive is killed when Lincoln Campbell sacrifices his life to blow up the Quinjet outside of Earth's orbit.
- Inhuman Primitives – Created through Holden Radcliffe's experiments to replicate the creation of Inhumans that were sponsored by Hive. They are created with a pathogen which combines Terrigen Crystals, the blood of Daisy Johnson and a Kree Reaper, and Hive's own parasitic organism.
- Hellfire (James/J.T. Slade) – A former mercenary and demolitions expert who was banished from Afterlife after he broke into Jiaying's archives. He was denied Terrigenesis, becoming bitter towards Jiaying. Hive and Daisy Johnson later subjected James to Terrigenesis, giving him the ability to charge anything up for a fiery explosion.
- Jiaying – Mother of Daisy/Skye Johnson and Kora, and wife of Calvin Zabo, who helped new Inhumans manage their newfound powers and appearances. She had the power of longevity and a healing factor which was realized by aging Hydra member Daniel Whitehall, who experimented on her living body to obtain the secret to eternal youth. Her husband managed to put her back together, although a number of scars remained. However, the mutilation destroyed her sense of morals. At the end of Season 2, she manipulated the Inhumans into a war with S.H.I.E.L.D., perceiving the latter as a threat. She was eventually killed by Zabo who snapped her back while she was attempting to murder her daughter.
- Joey Gutierrez – An Inhuman with the ability to melt any metallic object in a range of three meters around him, especially by touching them. The melting effect affects both the item he is touching, and other items in close range. His power tends to cause explosions when touching vehicles, as the fuel explodes. He was a member of the Secret Warriors team, but chose to return to civilian life.
- Katya Belyakov – Eva's young daughter who developed the power of sense manipulation. Jaiying refused to allow her to undergo Terrigenesis, but was later subjected to it by her mother. Due to her young age, the lack of proper mental preparation, and "a darkness" Jaiying saw within her, she became unstable, displaying several signs of psychopathic schizophrenia. Katya started causing carnage in Bahrain, while controlling many people including her mother. Forced to choose between further loss of innocent lives and the death of a maniacally murderous powered child, Melinda May had to shoot her.
- Kora - The daughter of Jiaying and half-sister of Daisy who had a hard time controlling her energy-manipulating abilities. She committed suicide in 1983. Because of the Chronicoms interfering with the timeline, her fate was changed when she was approached by Nathaniel Malick and persuaded to side with him. When the Chronicoms follow S.H.I.E.L.D. back to the original timeline, Kora defects to Daisy's side. Following Nathaniel's defeat, Kora accompanies Daisy and Daniel Sousa on a S.H.I.E.L.D. mission.
- Lash (Dr. Andrew Garner) – Melinda May's estranged husband, professor of Psychology, S.H.I.E.L.D. consultant Psychiatrist trusted to evaluate Inhumans for potential agents, and to treat existing agents. He underwent Terrigenesis from Jiaying's booby trapped ledger. His transformation turned him into a blue-skinned bestial form with a long mane growing from his scalp down to his upper back, known as Lash. Armed with super strength and energy manipulation, and an irresistible need to be near other Inhumans, he hunted and killed dozens of them. He was later killed by Hellfire after using his powers to save Daisy Johnson from Hive and killing some Inhuman Primitives.
- Li - The second-in-command of Jiaying in the alternate 1983 who can conjure knives from thin air. He was subjected to a blood transfusion overseen by Nathaniel Malick where his blood samples were placed into the mercenary Durant. Li was later killed by Kora.
- Lincoln Campbell – Lincoln Campbell is an Inhuman doctor who previously worked in Afterlife as a transitioner. He had electricity manipulation powers after terrigenesis. He helped Skye understand the true extent of her transformation. Originally siding with Jiaying during the War against the Inhumans, he began to doubt her intentions seeing her kill innocent agents, and after learning the truth from Skye, helped S.H.I.E.L.D. defeat Jiaying. In the aftermath of the war, Campbell attempted to start a new peaceful life, but was forced to go into hiding when he was pursued by a murderous Inhuman named Lash and the ATCU. Lincoln Campbell later sacrifices his life to blow up the Quinjet that he and Hive were on outside of Earth's orbit.
- Lori Henson – The wife of Shane Henson, Lori Henson was an Inhuman who lived in Afterlife before the War against the Inhumans began, becoming a friend of Alisha. When Gordon relocated the citizens of the hidden settlement during the War, she and her husband Shane returned to their apartment in Hollywood, California. Henson had the ability to generate fire from her arms as she did before she was killed by Lash.
- Lucio – An Inhuman who worked with the National Police of Colombia. Lucio has the ability to trap people in a rigor mortis-like state by staring at them. As he was unable to control the power, Lucio was forced to wear sunglasses at all times. He was later abducted by Hydra, where Hive used his powers to sway him to his side. Lucio was later killed by Joey Gutierrez.
- Michael – An Inhuman who resides at Afterlife. He was later evacuated from Afterlife during Jiaying's war on S.H.I.E.L.D.
- Quake (Daisy/Skye Johnson) – Jiaying's daughter and a S.H.I.E.L.D. agent who has the power to manipulate vibration following her exposure to the Terrigen mists. She is able to tap into the vibrational energy of everything around her.
- R. Giyera – Giyera was gifted with Inhuman powers by Hydra and became the head of security for Endotex Labs, working directly under Gideon Malick to ensure no one learned of their true intentions for the Inhumans. Giyera has the power to use telekinesis to move objects at his will. He was able to lift two discarded handguns and make them stay in the air, while pulling the trigger to shoot at Lance Hunter and Bobbi Morse, by simply rising his hands. Later, he summoned a metal pipe by directing his hand towards it, using it as a blunt weapon against Morse. As the head of security for the ATCU and the personal bodyguard of Gideon Malick, Giyera has extensive knowledge of martial arts. He chose to fight Bobbi Morse without his powers and gave her a competitive battle that was disrupted by Lance Hunter's interference. Giyera was later killed by Leo Fitz using a special gun that was in stealth mode.
- Raina – A former member of Project Centipede who often wears a flower dress. After Terrigenesis, Raina became a thorn-covered Inhuman with claws and yellow eyes as well as enhanced strength and durability. Her new form is apparently uncomfortable even for her as her insides feel malformed and was brought to Afterlife by Gordon who saved her from a walk into traffic-type suicide attempt. Raina was the first recorded Inhuman to have precognition powers. She was eventually murdered by Jiaying after her precognitive visions allowed her to see Jiaying's plan to start a war with S.H.I.E.L.D.
- Robin Hinton - The prophet and Charles Hinton's daughter. Robin began showing prolific precognition at a very young age.
- Shane Henson – The husband of Lori Henson, Shane Henson was an Inhuman who lived in Afterlife and went into hiding. He possessed the ability to levitate a few inches above the ground. Shane was later killed by Lash.
- Tucker Shockley – An elite member of the Watchdogs who underwent Terrigenesis when trying to see if Senator Ellen Nadeer was an Inhuman. His Terrigenesis caused him to explode and then reassemble his own molecules.
- Vijay Nadeer – An Inhuman who is the brother of a senator named Ellen Nadeer who distrusts Inhumans and sees them as a threat to society. Following Terrigenesis, he remained in his cocoon for months. Once he finally emerged, he gained superhuman speed.
- Wilton – Doctor Wilton was an Inhuman called by Jiaying after she refused medical attention from S.H.I.E.L.D. following sustaining a gunshot wound when she was in negotiations with Robert Gonzales. While Skye, Lincoln Campbell, and Jiaying talked, Wilton removed the bullet fragments from Jiaying's shoulder and stitched her wound. Skye asked Doctor Wilton if Jiaying needed a blood donation, but Campbell started arguing again before Wilton could answer.
- Yat-Sen – An elderly Inhuman with unknown powers. Along with Jiaying, he prepared young Inhumans for Terrigenesis and helped the newly transformed in their settlement Afterlife.
- Yo-Yo (Elena Rodriguez) – A young Colombian Inhuman who can move quickly while also returning from where she started. Believing her new power to be a gift from God, she uses her gift to fight corrupt elements within the Colombian political system, including the National Police of Colombia. This briefly put her into conflict with S.H.I.E.L.D. As they saw that Rodriguez was using her powers for good, they recruited her into the Secret Warriors. Eventually, her speed evolved to the point where she did not need to return to her starting point.

=== Appearing in Marvel's Inhumans ===
The Inhuman Royal Family and other notable Inhumans from the comics appeared in the Marvel Television series Marvel's Inhumans. They consist of:

- Black Bolt (Blackagar Boltagon) – The silent king of the Inhuman city of Attilan whose voice is so loud he does not speak and instead relies on sign language to communicate.
- Medusa (Medusalith Amaquelin Boltagon) – The wife of Black Bolt with long red prehensile hair that can stretch.
- Crystal (Crystallia Amaquelin) – The princess of the Inhuman Royal Family and sister of Medusa who can manipulate Earth, Air, Fire, and Water.
- Gorgon (Gorgon Petragon) – An Inhuman with cattle-like hooves.
- Karnak (Karnak Mander-Azur) – A member of the Royal Family with a fighting ability who can exploit an enemy's weakness.
- Triton (Triton Mander Azur) – An Inhuman with an aquatic fish-like appearance and a fin on his head.
- Lockjaw – An Inhuman dog with the power of teleportation.
- Maximus Boltagon – Black Bolt's brother, who plans to take over Attilan.
- Auran – A member of the Royal Guard with a regenerative healing factor who is loyal to Maximus.
- Iridia – In this show, Iridia still had her butterfly wings and is depicted as the daughter of Loyolis and Paripan and the sister of Bronaja.
- Eldrac – An Inhuman who becomes part of a wall that can teleport anyone to the place they want to go. He sacrificed himself to save Black Bolt when the city of Attilan was destroyed.
- Kitang – Leader of the Genetic Council. He was killed by Auran.
- Pulsus – An electricity-manipulating Inhuman loyal to Maximus and strong enough to subdue Medusa and Lockjaw. He was killed by one of the surfers who befriended Gorgon.
- Bronaja – A recently emerged Inhuman who developed the ability to see into the future of anyone who touches him.
- Duodon – An Inhuman whose projector-like eyes can project what events have happened. However, he is incapable of regular sight and requires assistance to move around.
- Flora – A plant-manipulating Inhuman who became an agent for the Inhuman Royal Guard and is loyal to Maximus.
- Locus – An Inhuman who became an agent of the Royal Guard. She is loyal to Maximus and has echolocation ability. She was later taken prisoner by Black Bolt and Maximus to find Gorgon and Triton. Before being killed by cannabis farmers, Locus tells Black Bolt and Medusa that Crystal is on Oahu and to make some changes to Attilan when they return.
- Loyolis – An Inhuman and the father of Bronaja and Iridia who has reptilian hands.
- Mordis – The second most dangerous Inhuman on Attilan with powerful energy beams held back by his special mask who was imprisoned by Black Bolt until he was freed by Maximus to help Auran hunt down the Inhuman Royal Family. He was killed alongside Gorgon when he sacrificed himself, though Gorgon was later revived by the Terrigen Mists.
- Paripan – An Inhuman and the mother of Bronaja and Iridia.
- Sakas – An acid-spitting Inhuman who became an agent for the Inhuman Royal Guard and is loyal to Maximus. He was accidentally killed in an explosion caused by Mordis at Evan Declun's facility.
- Sammy – A recently transformed Inhuman with a heat touch who befriended Black Bolt at the Oahu Corrections Facility.
- Tibor – A member of the Genetic Council who is an old friend of Maximus. He is later killed by Maximus.
- Jane – A newly turned Inhuman who lived in Hawaii and went through Terrigenesis during the Inhuman Outbreak and she has eyesight is wider than a normal human's, signified by her golden eyes. While on the run from a group of military troops, she met Triton who attempted to save her. Just before Triton could take her to Attilan, Jane is suddenly shot from behind and seemingly killed by Hunter One.

=== Appearing in Doctor Strange in the Multiverse of Madness ===
The Marvel Studios film Doctor Strange in the Multiverse of Madness reintroduces characters from the Marvel Television series Marvel's Inhumans. They consist of:

- Black Bolt (Blackagar Boltagon) – The silent king of the Inhuman city of Attilan whose voice is so loud he does not speak and instead relies on sign language to communicate, and a member of the Illuminati. He was killed by Scarlet Witch who erased his mouth and suffered a head explosion upon being frightened by this outcome.
