= Algenis Perez Soto =

Dominican actor

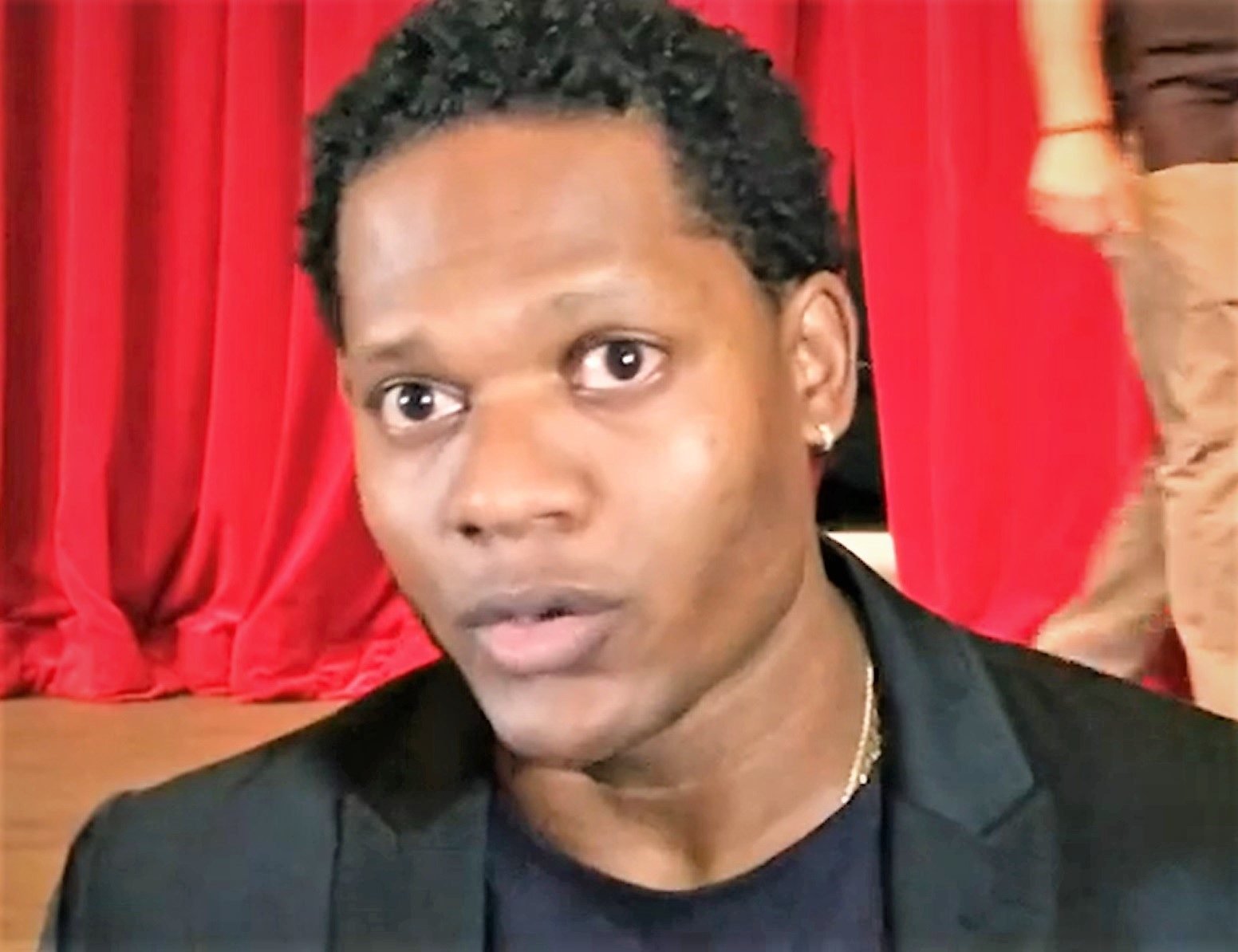
- Soto in 2019
- Born: San Pedro de Macorís, San Pedro de Macorís Province, Dominican Republic
- Occupation: Actor
- Years active: 2007–present
- Spouse: Anabelle Acosta (m. 2019)

Algenis Perez Soto is a Dominican actor. He is best known for his title role in the film Sugar (2008) and his portrayal of Att-Lass in the film Captain Marvel (2019).

== Early life ==
Soto grew up in Quisqueya, Dominican Republic, a suburb of San Pedro de Macoris, and dreamed of playing professional baseball. He grew up as the middle of three sons. By local standards, Soto’s family was well-off, with his mother working as a high school secretary and his father running a small business. Soto graduated from high school and had taken computer classes. He played amateur baseball for three years in the hopes of being discovered by a scout, usually playing shortstop or second base. He also worked as front desk clerk at a hotel in San Pedro. Anna Boden and Ryan Fleck discovered Soto playing baseball with friends, and interviewed him for the role. He was one of about 500 actors interviewed for the role.

== Career ==
Soto speaks Dominican Spanish and knew little English until he prepared for and starred in the film Sugar, which was shot in the Dominican Republic, New York City, Arizona and Iowa.

Soto has continued to live in the United States since the release of Sugar, saying, "I've been like a different person now. Hopefully, this opens more doors."

Boden and Fleck cast Soto as Att-Lass, a member of Starforce for 2019's Captain Marvel.

== Filmography ==
Year	Title	Role	Notes
2008	Sugar	Miguel	
2017	Sambá	Francisco Castillo	
2018	La Isla Rota	Guy	
2019	Captain Marvel	Att-Lass	
TBA	Isolated Victim	Dyson Romero	Post-production
