= Starforce =

Fictional team in Marvel Comics and related media

- Interior panel from Avengers Vol. 1, #346 (April 1992). Art by Steve Epting and Tom Palmer. Letters by Bill Oakley.

Publication information
- Publisher: Marvel Comics
- First appearance: Avengers #346 (April 1992)
- Created by: Bob Harras (writer); Steve Epting (artist)

In-story information
- Type of organization: Team
- Agent(s): Captain Atlas; Doctor Minerva; Ronan the Accuser; Supremor; Ultimus; Korath the Pursuer; Shatterax; Deathbird

The Starforce is a supervillain team appearing in American comic books published by Marvel Comics. Its first appearance was in the comic Avengers #346 released in 1992, as part of the "Operation: Galactic Storm" storyline. The team are a Kree team of super-powered individuals brought together by the Supreme Intelligence.

Starforce appeared in the Marvel Cinematic Universe film Captain Marvel (2019).

== Publication history ==
Starforce first appeared in Avengers #346 (April 1992), created by writer Bob Harras and artist Steve Epting. The team debuted during the storyline Operation Galactic Storm and played a major role in the Kree-based part of the story. Following the outcome of that story, now under the control of the Shi'ar, they confronted Quasar, Her and Makkari who had travelled to the Kree homeworld to see if they can help survivors.

The team reappeared in other Marvel space stories, including Silver Surfer: Breakout, Blackwulf and during Annihilation they are exiled as traitors.

== Members ==
The initial team was:

- Captain Atlas
- Doctor Minerva
- Ronan the Accuser
- Supremor
- Ultimus
- Korath the Pursuer
- Shatterax

After her capture, the Shi'ar noblewoman Deathbird joined them and then led the team following the destruction of the Kree when she was placed in charge of the former Kree empire.

== In other media ==
The Starforce team as depicted in the 2019 film, Captain Marvel (L-R: Korath, Bron-Char, Carol Danvers, Att-Lass, Minn-Erva).

The Starforce appears in the 2019 live-action Marvel Cinematic Universe film Captain Marvel. Led by Yon-Rogg, this version of the team consists of Carol Danvers (then known as Vers), Korath, Minn-Erva, Att-Lass, and Bron-Char. While on a mission to the planet Torfa to rescue a Kree scout, they are ambushed by a group of Skrulls led by Talos, who capture Vers. She later escapes to Earth and contacts Yon-Rogg, who leads the Starforce to the planet to rescue her. After discovering Skrull refugees, Starforce takes them as well as Nick Fury and Maria Rambeau prisoner and force Vers, who regained her memory and discovered the truth of her identity and the Kree's war with the Skrulls, into a transmission with the Supreme Intelligence. However, Danvers breaks free and annihilates Starforce while rescuing her friends and the Skrulls.
