= Operation: Galactic Storm =

19-part comic book crossover storyline

- Cover of The Avengers vol. 1, 345 (March 1992), art by Steve Epting
- Publisher: Marvel Comics
- Publication date: March – May 1992
- Genre: Superhero; Crossover
Title(s)
The Avengers vol. 1, #345-347
Avengers West Coast #80-82
Captain America vol. 1, #398-401
Iron Man vol. 1, #278-279
Quasar #32-36
Thor vol. 1, #445-446
Wonder Man #7-9
- Main character(s): The Avengers; Kree; Shi'ar; Skrulls
- Volume 1: ISBN 0-7851-2044-0
- Volume 2: ISBN 0-7851-2045-9

"Operation: Galactic Storm" is a 19-part comic book crossover storyline which ran through Marvel Comics' Avengers related titles – The Avengers, Avengers West Coast, Captain America, Iron Man, Thor, Wonder Man, and Quasar – between March and May 1992.

The storyline, which involves the Avengers intervening in an intergalactic war between the alien Kree and Shi'ar empires, is notable for reigniting the longstanding antagonism between Captain America and Iron Man, and its impact on the status quo for Marvel's alien empires, with the Shi'ar annexing the Kree Empire.

The overarching plotline was devised by Mark Gruenwald, Bob Harras, and Fabian Nicieza, although each individual issue was written and drawn by the regular creative teams for each title.

== Publication history ==
The title of the storyline is an allusion to Operation Desert Storm, the Pentagon's operational title for the 1991 Gulf War, which had recently been resolved when the idea for "Operation: Galactic Storm" was conceived. Although the phrase is featured in the storyline, the plot bears no relation to the Gulf conflict and was not intended to have any overt parallels.

The crossover was in many ways a sequel to a previous Avengers story - the 1971/1972 "Kree-Skrull War." Like the previous story, "Operation: Galactic Storm" features the Avengers getting caught in the middle of a cosmic war waged between two alien empires - this time, the Kree and the Shi'ar (rather than the Kree/Skrull conflict featured in its predecessor) - because that war endangers Earth.

Mark Gruenwald discussed the origins of the storyline as a Quasar story which was expanded when he (then Marvel's executive editor and writer of Captain America and Quasar), Bob Harras (at the time the Avengers writer and editor of the X-Men line), and Fabian Nicieza (then editor of Wonder Man and a writer of numerous non-Avengers books) were looking for an appropriate plot for a proposed Avengers crossover.

Harras's role was instrumental in approving the story. As the X-Men editor, he could authorize the extensive use of the Shi'ar, a race which had rarely appeared outside of the X-Men titles, where they had made their debut.

The three creators mapped out the proposed storyline, which was further expanded at an "Avengers summit" where all the writers and editors whose series were involved in the crossover gathered to refine the plot further.

Creators who contributed to the storyline included writers Gruenwald, Harras, Tom DeFalco, Gerard Jones, Len Kaminski, and Roy Thomas (who wrote the original Kree-Skrull War storyline); pencillers Greg Capullo, Steve Epting, Ron Frenz, Jeff Johnson, Rik Levins, Pat Olliffe, David Ross, and Paul Ryan; and editors Nicieza, Ralph Macchio, Nel Yomtov, and Kelly Corvese.

The storyline was tightly plotted so that each issue was supposed to carry the story forward in some way. Each character's characterization was mainly kept consistent with their portrayals from their ongoing titles and long developing themes and storylines were updated and further developed.

== Plot summary ==
=== The war reaches Earth ===
The plot begins in Captain America #398 (March 1992) with the kidnapping of Rick Jones by Shi'ar agents intent on recovering Kree artifacts to aid them in the construction of a superweapon. In the course of rescuing Jones, Captain America discovers that a conflict has begun between the alien Kree and Shi'ar empires.

In Quasar #32 (March 1992), Captain America's fellow Avenger, Quasar, discovers that the use of a nearby stargate by the warring factions is destabilizing Earth's Sun. The Avengers gather and resolve to intervene in the conflict to try to ensure the safety of their solar system, either by bringing about a truce or by diverting the two empires from using the nearby stargate.

=== The Avengers assemble ===
In Avengers #345 (March 1992), a gathering of over twenty Avengers is divided into three teams to deal with the threat. One team stays on Earth to protect the planet for the duration of the conflict, while the other two are sent to the Shi'ar and Kree homeworlds via the Stargate to attempt to negotiate with the leaders of the two empires.

The "Earth team" is led by the Wasp and includes the Falcon, Hank Pym, Gilgamesh, Mockingbird, She-Hulk, Spider-Woman, and U.S. Agent. Quasar, Her, and Binary also remain in the Solar System to guard the stargates.

The "Shi'ar Team" is led by Captain Marvel and includes Living Lightning, Scarlet Witch, Starfox, Thor, Vision, and Wonder Man.

Finally, the "Kree Team" is led by Captain America and includes Black Knight, Crystal, Goliath, Hercules, Iron Man, and Sersi.

In the story, U.S. Agent is initially assigned to the "Kree Team," and Hawkeye to the "Earth Team." However, Clint Barton (Hawkeye's real identity) perceives this as a slight and is given Pym Particles to re-assume his Goliath identity.

This is one of the story's few overt references to the original "Kree-Skrull War" storyline, as Barton also appears as Goliath in that storyline (a fact which Barton and Pym comment on in the story).

=== The Kree-Shi'ar War ===
The Kree and Shi'ar Avengers teams go on to encounter various factions (including their super-powered teams, Starforce and the Imperial Guard, respectively). They are largely unsuccessful in engaging them in negotiations. Captain America's team are repeatedly captured and imprisoned by the Kree authorities while Captain Marvel's team engages in several short battles with various Shi'ar forces.

During the course of these encounters, it is revealed that the Shi'ar created a massive super weapon—the "Nega-Bomb"— using Kree artifacts. This bomb is capable of devastating an area equivalent to that of the Kree Empire.

Also, during the conflict, the Kree's military leaders are assassinated by the Shi'ar agent Deathbird, the Supreme Intelligence regains (temporary) control of the Kree forces, and Skrull agents are revealed to be surreptitiously manipulating the court of Lilandra Neramani into escalating the conflict.

Eventually, Captain Marvel's Avengers delegation manages to convince Lilandra to initiate peace negotiations with the Kree. However, by this point, the Nega-Bomb has been stolen by Skrull agents and her efforts to recall the weapon fail.

Despite the presence of Avengers members Wonder Man and the Vision in the Nega-Bomb's massive interior, the device is successfully detonated in Wonder Man #9 (May 1992). The Kree Empire is devastated by its effects, with billions dying instantaneously.

In Avengers #347 (May 1992), the various Avengers gather on Hala, the Kree homeworld, and discover that most of the events of the war - up to and including the Nega-Bomb's detonation - have been manipulated and engineered by the Supreme Intelligence to jumpstart the Kree's stagnant evolution.

Horrified by this revelation, and faced with the problem of what to do now with the captured Supreme Intelligence, a group of Avengers decides that the Supreme Intelligence should be killed for its act of genocide.

Disagreeing with this idea completely, Captain America holds a vote, and when a majority of Avengers agree that killing the Intelligence is not appropriate, he orders that no Avenger should kill the creature. Iron Man refuses to follow this order (invoking his seniority as a founding member), and he and the other dissenting Avengers- Black Knight, Hercules, Sersi, Thor, Vision, and Wonder Man attempt to terminate the creature, apparently succeeding.

A Shi'ar delegation then appears and announces that they will annex the devastated Kree Empire, with Lilandra's sister Deathbird becoming viceroy of the Kree territories. The Avengers return to Earth divided and disillusioned by the events of the storyline, and the consciousness of the Supreme Intelligence is shown to have survived and escaped to a waiting spaceship crewed by Skrulls.

=== Aftermath of the war ===
The immediate aftermath of the storyline is explored in the Captain America and Quasar titles. Captain America #401 (June 1992) examines the effects of the conflict on Captain America, including his disappointment in teammates who disobeyed his orders and in the Avengers group as a whole.

Quasar #35 and #36 (June - July 1992) explore the larger repercussions of the storyline, including the impact on the wider cosmos of the Nega-Bomb explosion, the sudden demise of billions of lifeforms, and the collapse of a major space empire.

Other comics which tie directly into the events of "Operation Galactic Storm" include Silver Surfer (vol. 2) #79 (April 1993) which features the return of two Kree characters, Doctor Minerva and Captain Atlas, who are thought to have died after "Operation: Galactic Storm"; and X-Men Unlimited #5 (June 1994) which features the Shi'ar's formal ceremonies of the annexation of the Kree Empire into the Shi'ar empire, likewise Avengers Forever #8 (July 1997), features how the events of the crossover may lead (and led at least in one timeline) the Avengers to become a paramilitary group that controls a vast and repressive interstellar empire, Iron Man's actions at the time having been provoked by Immortus to create a crucial schism in the team that would prevent them from following this path.

=== Sequels ===
In a more general sense, the implications and repercussions of the events depicted in the crossover have had a wide and ongoing impact on many stories set in the Marvel Universe, most especially those featuring the Kree, Shi'ar, and Skrull, as the events of the crossover altered the status quo of each of these races to varying degrees.

Many subsequent Avengers storylines feature attempts by surviving Kree to exact revenge on the Avengers team for their supposed role in the Nega-Bomb's detonation, more specifically Avengers #364-366 and the 1998 four-part Avengers crossover Live Kree or Die!. The former introduces Deathcry to the Avengers, a Shi'ar rebel who is part of a secret movement seeking to aid the Kree suffering under Shi'ar rule. Deathcry would ultimately leave the Avengers in Avengers #389 to help fight alongside the Kree.

The crossover events "Avengers Forever" and "Maximum Security" restore the Kree Empire to its former glory. Using the Time Crystal acquired in "Avengers Forever," the Supreme Intelligence evolves the Kree into a new monstrous form known as the Ruul. Pretending to be a newly discovered species, the Ruul manipulate the Galactic Council, a coalition of the universe's oldest planetary ruling powers, into turning Earth into a prison planet for alien criminals and attempt to weaponize Ego the Living Planet. However, Earth's heroes liberate Earth and free it from Ego.

== Bibliography ==
The original crossover:

- Part 1: Captain America #398 (March 1992)
- Part 2: Avengers West Coast #80 (March 1992)
- Part 3: Quasar #32 (March 1992)
- Part 4: Wonder Man #7 (March 1992)
- Part 5: Avengers #345 (March 1992)
- Part 6: Iron Man #278 (March 1992)
- Part 7: Thor #445 (March 1992)
- Part 8: Captain America #399 (April 1992)
- Part 9: Avengers West Coast #81 (April 1992)
- Part 10: Quasar #33 (April 1992)
- Part 11: Wonder Man #8 (April 1992)
- Part 12: Avengers #346 (April 1992)
- Part 13: Iron Man #279 (April 1992)
- Part 14: Thor #446 (April 1992)
- Part 15: Captain America #400 (May 1992)
- Part 16: Avengers West Coast #82 (May 1992)
- Part 17: Quasar #34 (May 1992)
- Part 18: Wonder Man #9 (May 1992)
- Part 19: Avengers #347 (May 1992)

Aftermaths:

- Captain America #401 (June 1992)
- Quasar #35 (June 1992)
- Quasar #36 (July 1992)

Post Quasar #36 related stories:

- Wonder Man #10 (June 1992)
- Avengers West Coast #83 (June 1992)
- Silver Surfer (vol. 2) #79 (April 1993)
- What if? #55 (November 1993)
- What if? #56 (December 1993)
- X-Men Unlimited #5 (June 1994)
- Avengers Forever #8 (July 1999)

=== Collected editions ===
The storyline has been collected into two trade paperbacks as well as a volume in Marvel's "Epic Collection" line.

- Avengers: Galactic Storm:
  - Volume 1 (collects Captain America #398-399, Avengers West Coast #80-81, Quasar #32-33, Wonder Man #7-8, Avengers #345-346, Iron Man #278, and Thor #445, 280 pages, March 2006, ISBN 0-7851-2044-0)
  - Volume 2 (collects Iron Man #279, Thor #446, Captain America #400-401, Avengers West Coast #82, Quasar #34-35, Wonder Man #9, Avengers #347, and What If? #55-56, 288 pages, December 2006, ISBN 0-7851-2045-9)
- Avengers Epic Collection:
  - Volume 22: Operation: Galactic Storm (collects Avengers #345-347, Avengers West Coast #80–82, Quasar #32–34, Wonder Man #7–9, Iron Man #278–279, Thor #445–446, Captain America #401 and material from Captain America #398-400, 488 pages, July 2017, ISBN 978-1302906894)

== Other versions ==
=== What If? ===
Issues #55 and 56 in the second volume of What If ask "What If the Avengers Lost Operation: Galactic Storm?".

== In other media ==
- Elements of "Operation: Galactic Storm" are adapted into The Avengers: Earth's Mightiest Heroes episode of the same name.
- Elements of "Operation: Galactic Storm" are adapted into Avengers in Galactic Storm.
