= Avengers in Galactic Storm =

1995 video game

- North American arcade flyer
- Developer: Data East
- Publisher: Data East
- Producers: Iwao Horita; Naomi Susa
- Designer: Makoto Kikuchi
- Programmers: Takatoshi Katahata; Kagenobu Murata
- Artists: Masayuki Inoshita; Hideyasu Shibahara; Shintaro Tamai; Makoto Nozu; Gorimori; Wataru Oguri; Yoshinari Kaiho; Shinobu Suzuki
- Composers: Seiichi Hamada; Ring Ring; Takuto Kitsuta; Shogo Sakai
- Platform: Arcade game
- Release: JP: 1995; NA: 1996
- Genre: Versus fighting game
- Modes: Single-player, multiplayer
- Arcade system: Data East MLC System hardware

Avengers in Galactic Storm (アベンジャーズ・イン・ギャラクティックストーム) is a 1995 fighting arcade game developed and published by Data East. It features a single or two-player story mode or multiplayer head-to-head mode, and was the first modern fighting game to feature assistant characters commonly referred to by gamers either as "helpers" or "strikers". The game is based on characters in the Marvel universe, primarily The Avengers but also the Kree. The game's plot and roster of playable characters is based on the Operation: Galactic Storm story arc. Before their bankruptcy in 2003, it was one of Data East's last fighting games, as well as their third and last game based on The Avengers after their two 1991 video games: the Captain America and The Avengers beat 'em up arcade and the NES platform game of the same name.

On February 26, 1996, Pony Canyon and Scitron Label added the background music of Avengers in Galactic Storm with the background music of another Data East MLC System title, Skull Fang, both into an album titled Skull Fang / Avengers in Galactic Storm, which was released exclusively in Japan. The game never received a console release, but, in 2021, Galactic Storm was included in an Arcade1Up cabinet collection alongside X-Men and Captain America and the Avengers.

== Gameplay ==
Avengers in Galactic Storm is mostly space-themed and plays similarly to other 2D versus fighting games during its release, which the player's character fights against their opponent in best two-out-of-three matches in a single player tournament mode with the computer or against another human player. The player has a character roster of eight playable fighters to choose from, each with their moves and fighting styles from the comics. The main unique feature of Avengers in Galactic Storm is the assistant character roster. Players choose both a playable character and an assistant to fight with before proceeding with the selected mode. There are three types of bars above the fighting segments: health, power and assistant. If the health bar becomes empty, that character becomes knocked out. If the power bar becomes full, that character now has a chance to perform desperation moves. If one of the two assistant bars become full, that character can call out their assistant to briefly attack their opponent (up to two times) before they leave the stage.

There are two modes in the game, "Story Mode" and "VS Mode". In "Story Mode", when selected, the player has to select one of two "Mid-Game Participants": "Friend (Team Member)" or "Foe (Opponent)". One player can either fight alone or team up with a second player against opponents throughout this mode. The object of this mode is to knock out several characters in order of appearance throughout the Operation: Galactic Storm story arc. Each player will have two lives either at the beginning or when continuing. When completed, the game will force players to fight previously fought characters randomly selected and played by the computer player. When two players team up, and when both players' power bars are full, one of the players can create a "double-powerful tandem move", a duplex desperation move which is another unique feature of the game later inspiring others like Marvel vs. Capcom: Clash of Super Heroes and Rage of the Dragons. "VS Mode" is like most multiplayer modes of other 2D versus fighting games, which two players fight head-to-head against each other.

== Plot ==
Thunderstrike VS. Shatterax.

The game's plot and roster of playable characters and their assistant characters are based on the Operation: Galactic Storm story arc. All the characters in the game are voiced by Jon St. John and Lani Minella.

== Characters ==
=== Playable characters ===
- Avengers:
  - Captain America
  - Black Knight
  - Crystal
  - Thunderstrike
- Kree:
  - Korath-Thak
  - Doctor Minerva
  - Shatterax
  - Supremor
  - Galen-Kor (non-playable boss)

=== Assist characters ===
- Avengers:
  - Iron Man
  - Thor
  - Vision
  - Giant Man
- Kree:
  - Atlas
  - Sentry
  - Ronan
  - Ultimus

== Reception ==
Computer and Video Games called the game an improvement over Data East's previous versus fighting game, Fighter's History. They wrote that the 3D rendered graphics were just as good as the ones in Killer Instinct, but called the backgrounds "totally flat". The magazine said that the game was not bad, was "not great either". A reviewer for Next Generation stated that despite the Avengers license, innovative assist character mechanic, and graphics (like Computer and Video games, he compared them favorably to those of Killer Instinct), at Golfland he observed a huge crowd around the Street Fighter Alpha 2 cabinet while one person was playing Avengers in Galactic Storm. He theorized that even with all its attractive "bells and whistles", the game could not complete in a market presently flooded with outstanding fighting games due to its merely average gameplay and character animations. He scored it 2 out of 5 stars.
