= Ronan the Accuser =

Marvel Comics fictional character

Publication information
- Publisher: Marvel Comics
- First appearance: Fantastic Four #65 (August 1967)
- Created by: Stan Lee; Jack Kirby

In-story information
- Species: Kree
- Team affiliations: Kree Empire; Starforce; United Front; Phalanx; Annihilators
- Abilities: Expert in military tactics; Skilled hand-to-hand combatant; Superhuman strength, speed, endurance, and reflexes; Utilizes Kree exoskeleton armor; Wields "Universal Weapon"

Ronan the Accuser is a character appearing in American comic books published by Marvel Comics. Created by writer Stan Lee and artist Jack Kirby, he first appeared in Fantastic Four #65 (August 1967). Ronan is the Supreme Accuser of the Kree Empire, the militaristic government of the alien Kree, and commonly serves as an adversary of superhero teams such as the Fantastic Four, the Avengers, and the Guardians of the Galaxy. Initially portrayed as a supervillain, Ronan was later presented as a more noble and honorable figure.

Since his original introduction in comics, the character has been featured in various other Marvel-licensed products, including video games, animated television series, and merchandise. The character made his live-action debut in the Marvel Cinematic Universe film Guardians of the Galaxy (2014), portrayed by Lee Pace.

== Publication history ==
Ronan debuted in Fantastic Four #65 (August 1967), created by Stan Lee and Jack Kirby.

The character returned sporadically in Captain Marvel, and played an important role in the Kree-Skrull War storyline in The Avengers #88–97. After appearances in Ms. Marvel #19 and Silver Surfer vol. 3, Ronan returned in the Galactic Storm crossover in 1992.

Ronan subsequently appeared in Fantastic Four vol. 3 #13–14 and Iron Man vol. 3 #14, before having a major role in the Maximum Security crossover in Jan 2001.

During the 2006 Annihilation storyline, Ronan received a four-issue eponymous miniseries written by Simon Furman, and a leading role in Annihilation #1–6. He appeared in the sequels, Annihilation: Conquest #1–6 and Annihilation Conquest: Wraith #1–4 in 2007.

After being seen during the Secret Invasion: War of Kings one-shot, the character was used in War of Kings #1–6 (2009) and Realm of Kings: Inhumans #1–4. Following appearances in The Thanos Imperative #1–6 (2010), Ronan joined the titular team in Annihilators #1–4 (2011) and Annihilators: Earthfall #1–4 (Sept 2011–Dec 2011).

== Fictional character biography ==
Ronan was born on the planet Hala, the capital of the Kree Empire in the Greater Magellanic Cloud. Ronan later joined the Accuser Corps, who are the Kree equivalent of military governors and jurists, and his rise through their ranks was extraordinary; he eventually became the third-most powerful being in the Kree Empire. The Supreme Intelligence ultimately appointed him "Supreme Accuser of the Kree Empire". He is known simply as "Ronan the Accuser".

Ronan secretly plans with Zarek to overthrow the Kree leader, the Supreme Intelligence, believing the Empire should not be ruled by a non-humanoid entity. Ronan is paralyzed by the psionic powers of Rick Jones, with control of the Kree Empire reverting to the Supreme Intelligence.

During the Kree-Shi'ar War, Ronan joins Starforce.

When Earth becomes a prison planet, Ronan serves as its warden. The Supreme Intelligence plans to subvert the galactic council and use Ego the Living Planet as a weapon. Although Ronan is able to elevate his power by tapping into Ego's energy, Mister Fantastic, Iron Man, Giant-Man, and Bruce Banner create a machine that transfers Ego's essence into Quasar. Ronan is defeated and captured by U.S. Agent.

When Ronan is falsely accused of treason by Tana Nile, he discovers he has been framed by a highly placed member of a Kree house. After defending the Kree Empire against the Annihilation Wave, Ronan clears his name and kills his betrayer, although not before he lobotomizes the Supreme Intelligence. In an act of mercy, Ronan kills the Supreme Intelligence and becomes ruler of the Kree Empire.

When the Inhumans seek aid from the Kree against the Skrull invasion, Ronan agrees on the condition that the Inhuman princess, Crystal, marries him. Ronan is separated from Crystal under the orders of Black Bolt, as part of a truce made between Black Bolt and the Supreme Intelligence to ensure peace between Inhumans and the Kree. Crystal and Ronan are deeply saddened by this decision, as their arranged marriage had eventually become a stronger relationship.

Ronan steals The Black Vortex from the cosmically powered X-Men, and, against the Supreme Intelligence's orders, submits to the Vortex and receives cosmic powers. Mister Knife steals the Vortex and destroys Hala and the Supreme Intelligence. Ronan and the imperial fleet survive, but the last remaining seed of the Supreme Intelligence is stolen by Victoria.

== Powers and abilities ==
As a Kree warrior in peak physical condition, Ronan possesses his species' unique physiology and is thus resistant to poisons, toxins, and diseases. He has superhuman physical attributes which are all further enhanced by his exoskeleton body-armor. Ronan's armor, which contains multiple scanners, can also create fields of invisibility, and his gauntlets can discharge cosmic energy bolts or generate sufficient coldness to place certain lifeforms into a state of suspended animation. In addition, Ronan possesses a brilliant strategic mind; his high intellect allowed him to rise to one of the highest positions in the Kree Empire. He also has extensive knowledge in all matters pertaining to Kree law and is well-versed in the use of his species' highly advanced technology.

Ronan's primary weapon is a warhammer-like Accuser Cosmi-Rod called the Universal Weapon. At its wielder's will, the device can absorb and fire cosmic energy, manipulate matter, generate force-fields, control gravity, and create "time-motion displacement fields". It also allows for interstellar teleportation, hyperspatial passages and flight. As a highly trained Kree soldier, Ronan is proficient in the use of this weapon in both close- and long-ranged confrontations. Even without the Universal Weapon, Ronan has proven a formidable hand-to-hand combatant.

== Other versions ==
=== Ultimate Marvel ===
The Ultimate version of Ronan the Accuser is the son of Thanos, and is a part of his empire. He is ultimately defeated by the Thing.

In the series Hunger, another version of Ronan called Ro-Nan is married to Esa-La and have a son named Dra-ta. He leads an army of Kree warriors in a battle against the Chitauri, when both alien races encounter the entity Gah Lak Tus during battle. Ro-Nan is killed in Hunger #3.

== In other media ==
=== Television ===
- Ronan the Accuser makes a cameo appearance in the Silver Surfer episode "Radical Justice". This version is a member of the Wanderers, a group consisting of aliens displaced by Galactus.
- Ronan the Accuser appears in Fantastic Four: World's Greatest Heroes, voiced by Michael Dobson.
- Ronan the Accuser appears in The Super Hero Squad Show episode "Alienating with the Surfer!", voiced by Michael Dorn.
- Ronan the Accuser appears in The Avengers: Earth's Mightiest Heroes, voiced by Keith Szarabajka.
- Ronan the Accuser appears in Hulk and the Agents of S.M.A.S.H., voiced by James C. Mathis III.
- Ronan the Accuser, based on the MCU incarnation (see below), appears in Guardians of the Galaxy (2015), voiced by Jonathan Adams. This version was Thanos's top general until he betrayed him and was killed in battle against the Guardians of the Galaxy. In the present, Ronan is resurrected by Nebula.
- Ronan the Accuser appears in Lego Marvel Super Heroes - Guardians of the Galaxy: The Thanos Threat, voiced again by Jonathan Adams.
- Ronan the Accuser appears in Marvel Disk Wars: The Avengers, voiced by Hiroshi Shirokuma in the Japanese version and again by James C. Mathis III in the English version.
- Ronan the Accuser appears in X-Men '97, voiced by Todd Haberkorn.

=== Marvel Cinematic Universe ===
Lee Pace portrays Ronan the Accuser in films set in the Marvel Cinematic Universe.

- Ronan first appears in Guardians of the Galaxy (2014). This version is an avid and ruthless Kree fanatic whose family was killed in the Kree-Nova War. As such, he refuses to heed his Empire's peace treaty with the Nova Corps of Xandar and embarks on a genocidal campaign against the Xandarians. Ronan agrees to recover an orb for Thanos in exchange for the latter's help in destroying Xandar, only to renege on their deal upon learning that the orb contains the Power Stone, which he can use to annihilate Xandar himself. Ronan decimates the Nova Corps' fleet, but the Guardians of the Galaxy take the Power Stone back and use its energy to destroy him.
- A young Ronan appears in Captain Marvel (2019). While leading the Kree and working alongside the Starforce in hunting Skrulls across the universe, Starforce commander Yon-Rogg contacts Ronan to eradicate a group of Skrulls who came to Earth, but Ronan is forced to retreat after Carol Danvers obliterates his fleet.
- An alternate timeline version of Ronan makes a non-speaking appearance in the What If...? episode "What If... Nebula Joined the Nova Corps?", in which he kills Thanos after obtaining the Power Stone.

=== Video games ===
- Ronan the Accuser appears in Avengers in Galactic Storm.
- Ronan the Accuser appears as an unlockable character in Lego Marvel Super Heroes.
- Ronan the Accuser appears as an unlockable character in Lego Marvel's Avengers, voiced by John DiMaggio.
- Ronan the Accuser appears in Lego Marvel Super Heroes 2.
- Ronan the Accuser appears as a non-playable, later unlockable, character, in Marvel Avengers Alliance.
- Ronan the Accuser appears as an unlockable character in Marvel: Avengers Alliance Tactics.
- Ronan the Accuser, based on the MCU incarnation, appears as a playable character in Disney Infinity 2.0, voiced again by James C. Mathis III.
- Ronan the Accuser appears as a playable character in Marvel Contest of Champions.
- Ronan the Accuser, based on the MCU incarnation, appears as a playable character in Disney Infinity 3.0, voiced again by James C. Mathis III.
- Ronan the Accuser appears in Marvel Avengers Alliance 2.
- Ronan the Accuser appears as a playable character in Marvel: Future Fight.
- Ronan the Accuser appears in Marvel Powers United VR, voiced again by Jonathan Adams.
- Ronan the Accuser appears as a boss in Marvel Ultimate Alliance 3: The Black Order, voiced again by James C. Mathis III.
- Ronan the Accuser appears in Marvel Dimension of Heroes, voiced again by James C. Mathis III.
- Ronan the Accuser appears in Marvel Snap.

=== Merchandise ===
- Ronan the Accuser received a figure in the Classic Marvel Figurine Collection line.
- Ronan the Accuser received several figures in the Marvel HeroClix line.
- The MCU incarnation of Ronan the Accuser received a figure in the Guardians of the Galaxy film tie-in toy line.
- Two Ronan the Accuser bobble-heads were released as part of Funko's Guardians of the Galaxy Mystery Minis line.
- The MCU incarnation of Ronan the Accuser received a Funko Pop vinyl figure.
- Ronan the Accuser, based on the MCU incarnation, received a figure as part of the Disney Infinity 2.0 range of figures.
- The MCU incarnation of Ronan the Accuser received a GameStop-exclusive figure in Hasbro's Marvel Legends line via the Marvel Studios: The First Ten Years sub-line.

== Reception ==
The realization of the character within the Marvel Cinematic Universe has frequently been critized as one of the worst villains of the franchise. Guardians of the Galaxy director James Gunn also stated that the character "was something he wishes he could redo" and attributed some of the weakness of the antagonist to "a lot of input" into Ronan's part in the plot by "a committee working for Marvel at the time".
