= Crystal (character) =

Marvel Comics character

- Crystal as depicted in War of Kings: Warriors #2 (August 2009). Art by Paul Renaud.

Publication information
- Publisher: Marvel Comics
- First appearance: Fantastic Four #45 (Dec. 1965)
- Created by: Stan Lee (writer); Jack Kirby (artist)

In-story information
- Full name: Crystalia Amaquelin
- Species: Inhuman
- Team affiliations: Inhumans; Fantastic Four; Avengers; Galactic Council; Universal Inhumans
- Notable aliases: The People's Princess; Crystalia Amaquelin-Maximoff
- Abilities: Inhuman physiology: Superhuman strength, speed, stamina, durability, agility, and reflexes; Elemental powers manipulation: Air, wind, earth, metal, fire, heat, water, moisture, electricity, energy, ice, cold, and weather; Flight

Crystal (Crystalia Amaquelin) is a superhero appearing in American comic books published by Marvel Comics. Crystal first appeared in Fantastic Four #45 (Dec. 1965) and was created by writer Stan Lee and artist Jack Kirby.

Within the Marvel Universe, Crystal is a member of a fictional human subspecies known as Inhumans, who (due to genetic modifications performed by the Kree) became capable of developing superhuman abilities once exposed to the Terrigen Mist. Exposure to the Terrigen Mist grants abilities to psionically control the four classical elements: earth, wind, fire, and water and, by extension, can also grant the ability to manipulate various other natural materials and phenomena such as metals and electricity. Crystal was the first character to be identified as an Inhuman, and is one of the most prominent Inhuman characters. Crystal is a princess of the Inhuman Royal Family and sister to Medusa, Queen of the Inhumans. She often appears with her giant super-powered canine companion, Lockjaw.

The character has regularly appeared as a main character in several comic book titles, including various incarnations of the Inhumans as well as the Fantastic Four and the Avengers. The character is unique in her affiliation with all three of these groups. Earlier in her history, she was romantically involved with the Human Torch from the Fantastic Four. In later stories, she becomes more associated with the X-Men family of characters due to her short-lived marriage to Quicksilver, which resulted in the conception of their daughter, Luna. Crystal has also appeared in various other Marvel media such as television series and video games, as well as merchandise such as trading cards and action figures.

Crystal has been described as one of Marvel's most notable and powerful female heroes.

She made her live action debut in the 2017 Marvel Cinematic Universe (MCU) television series Inhumans, portrayed by Isabelle Cornish.

== Publication history ==
Crystal first appeared in Fantastic Four #45 (Dec. 1965), written by Stan Lee and illustrated by Jack Kirby, titled "Among Us Hide...The Inhumans". When asked, "Who created the Inhumans, you or Stan Lee?" in a 1968 interview for Excelsior magazine, Jack Kirby replied, "I did." Like other early Fantastic Four characters, there is debate about how much Stan Lee and Jack Kirby each contributed to the characters' creation.

Throughout her many appearances, Crystal has been depicted as brave, intelligent, and compassionate. While she is undoubtedly very kind and emotional, this is in stark contrast to her remarkable power, and she is more than capable of defending herself and others.

=== Fantastic Four (1965–1973) ===
Crystal was first introduced, along with the rest of the Inhuman Royal Family and the Inhuman race as a whole, in the pages of Fantastic Four. Upon their first meeting, she and Johnny Storm fell in love with one another, a fact that led to her continued presence among the team. From this time, she would become a mainstay of the team for the duration of Stan Lee and Jack Kirby's stint on the series. She was the first character to join the Fantastic Four, outside of its original members, when she officially joined the team as a replacement for Sue Richards, who was pregnant with Franklin Richards. She remained a member of the team, even after Sue's return. During her time with the team, she became very close to its members, particularly Ben Grimm and accompanied them on many adventures. Crystal was written out of Fantastic Four in issue #105, the first story arc after Jack Kirby's departure. At this time, the character returned to her family in Attilan due to her apparent inability to survive long-term in Earth's polluted atmosphere. Her time with the team and her status as a friend and ally would continue to be part of her identity as a character, up to the present.

=== Quicksilver and Luna (1973–1990) ===
After her return to Attilan, Crystal meets and falls in love with Quicksilver, Pietro Maximoff. During this time, Crystal is mostly featured alongside Quicksilver in a number of different series including Inhumans and Vision and the Scarlet Witch, along with guest appearances in Fantastic Four, Avengers, and other titles. In addition to her marriage to Quicksilver, this time period saw the introduction of Luna, the daughter of Crystal and Pietro and the development of close friendship between Crystal and Pietro's twin sister, Scarlet Witch (Wanda Maximoff), and her then-husband, Vision. In Steve Englehart's series, Vision and the Scarlet Witch vol. 2 (1986), Crystal has an affair with Vision and Wanda's "regular Joe" neighbor, Norm Webster. Crystal is purported to have committed this betrayal as a result of her mistreatment by Pietro. A few months later in X-Factor Annual #2 (October 1987), it is revealed that the behavior exhibited by both Crystal and Pietro was the result of mind control orchestrated by Maximus. From 1987 to 1988, Crystal again rejoins the eponymous team in Fantastic Four, which was also being written by Steve Englehart, at the time. Crystal departs the team abruptly in Fantastic Four Annual #21 after being convinced to do so by her king and brother-in-law, Black Bolt. The artwork at the end of the issue features character pages for the Fantastic Four and many supporting characters. Despite this being Crystal's last issue, her character page reads "It's great to be back with the Fantastic Four! I'll never leave again!"

=== Avenger (1991–1998) ===
Crystal has also appeared as a member of the Avengers. She was a prominent member of the main Avengers team for the term of Bob Harras' time as writer for the title, but declined in prominence shortly after he left to become Editor-in-Chief of Marvel Comics. In addition to starring in Avengers, the character also appeared in the solo books of her Avengers teammates during these years such as Captain America, Invincible Iron Man, and The Vision. While serving on the team, the character lived in Avengers Mansion with Luna and her nanny, Marilla. During this time period, the character would attempt to reconcile with Quicksilver off-and-on. Crystal was featured as an Avenger through many important storylines and events including Operation: Galactic Storm, Infinity War, Infinity Crusade, Bloodties, Onslaught, and Heroes Return. Crystal proved invaluable to the team many times during her tenure and was well-loved by her teammates. The character also featured prominently in the series Quicksilver toward the end of her tour as an active Avenger.

=== Return to Attilan (1998–2007) ===
This time period was a departure from Crystal's previous appearances because it marked the first time the character had returned to Attilan by her own choice for a significant amount of time since she first encountered the Fantastic Four. Crystal appeared in Inhumans vol. 2 (1998–1999), a limited series by Paul Jenkins and Jae Lee. The series, which was part of the Marvel Knights line, was critically acclaimed, popular with readers, and earned Jenkins an Eisner Award. From 2000 to 2005, the character mostly made guest appearances in Avengers, Fantastic Four, and other titles. Son of M (2006) and Silent War (2007), written by David Hine would bring the next major arc for Crystal. These books chronicled Quicksilver's betrayal of Crystal and the Inhumans in an attempt to use the Terrigen Mist to restore the mutants depowered during the events of House of M and the resulting conflict between Attilan and a fictional version of the United States.

=== Cosmic Inhumans (2008–2013) ===
This time period marked another new development for Crystal's character as she and her fellow Inhumans became involved in intergalactic conflicts. Secret Invasion: Inhumans (2008–2009) by Joe Pokaski marked the beginning as it was discovered that Black Bolt had been replaced by a Skrull. This revelation leads to a series of events that eventually sees the Inhumans ascend to become sovereigns of the Kree Empire and Crystal betrothed to Ronan the Accuser. Crystal was then featured through a series of books by Dan Abnett and Andy Lanning including War of Kings (2009), Realm of Kings: Inhumans (2010), and The Thanos Imperative (2010). During this time, Crystal showed her prowess not only as a warrior, but as a leader, as she and her family navigated political and military conflicts, particularly against Vulcan and the Shi'ar Imperium. From 2010 to 2013, her story continues in the pages of Fantastic Four and FF, in which she is forcibly separated from Ronan against both of their wishes. Although present in Infinity (2013) and Inhumanity (2013–2014), which, under new authorship, continue the events portrayed in Abnett and Lanning's aforementioned series, she does not play a major part in these books.

=== All-New, All-Different Marvel (2015–) ===
Despite her unexplained absence in Charles Soule's Marvel NOW! series Inhuman (2014–2015), Marvel has indicated that Crystal will be returning to the spotlight as a part of their All-New, All-Different Marvel initiative. She has been announced to appear in the upcoming Uncanny Inhumans series, and leaked information indicated the character would be featured in a starring role in All-New Inhumans, both also written by Charles Soule. The character has also appeared on the teaser image for All-New All-Different Marvel Point One, which is to be an introduction to the new series that are being launched as a part of All-New, All-Different Marvel. On August 19, 2015, it was officially announced that Crystal would be the leader of a team of Inhumans in All-New Inhumans, which will be co-written by Charles Soule and James Asmus with art by Stefano Caselli. "These stories follow a diplomatic mission/covert strike team effort led by Crystal," relates Asmus. "She's been at the center of the Inhumans, but also served as an Avenger, alongside the Fantastic Four, and even dabbled with the X-Men when she was married to Quicksilver. She's been a constant presence in the Marvel Universe, but leading this faction of NuHumans is her stepping up in a big way." The character's appearance has been significantly changed, having an updated costume and a pixie cut.

== Fictional character biography ==
Crystal is the daughter of Inhumans Quelin and Ambur, and lived in Attilan with the other Inhumans, until the Inhuman Royal Family was forced out of the Great Refuge by Maximus. Her first encounters with the outside world were via the Fantastic Four. She encountered the Human Torch, and brought him to the Inhumans' secret New York base. She left New York with her family members to escape the Seeker, but became trapped inside Maximus' "negative zone" barrier dome around the Great Refuge. She fell in love with the Human Torch, although their romance was blocked by a literal barrier, around the Inhumans' city. The Inhumans were eventually freed from the "negative zone" barrier, and left the Great Refuge along with the Royal Family to visit the outside world. She brought Triton to rescue Mister Fantastic from the real Negative Zone and aided the Fantastic Four in battle against Blastaar.

=== Joining the Fantastic Four ===
Crystal would later leave the city for a brief career with the Fantastic Four. Soon after joining, she battled the Wizard, and helped defeat Maximus. She also fought Doctor Doom alongside the Fantastic Four. She was temporarily blinded by the Mole Man, but helped the Fantastic Four defeat him. She was abducted by Medusa and reunited with the Torch in Attilan. She revealed how she had used her powers to save Black Bolt's life, and then rejoined the Fantastic Four. She fell under the mental control of Diablo, but soon regained her free will and returned to the Great Refuge.

=== Marriage ===
It was later revealed how she had rescued a dying Quicksilver (Pietro Maximoff). She chose Quicksilver over the Torch as the man she loved. Not long after that, she married Quicksilver. She later gave birth to their daughter, Luna, and accompanied the Inhumans when Attilan was relocated to Earth's Moon. During the time when the Inhumans lived on the Moon, Crystal defied the power structure of her society and fled with many Inhumans to an isolated part of Earth. They were there to help Medusa, their queen, give birth in secret. Crystal used her powers to eliminate the pollution from a wide area around their hideout, a mistake which led to even worse consequences.

Quicksilver and Crystal have had a rocky marriage. Pietro has always had a quick temper and Crystal had once had an affair with a real estate agent named Norman Webster. She and the Human Torch still had feelings for each other during his marriage to the supposed Alicia Masters (later revealed to be a Skrull named Lyja merely pretending to be Alicia). She also developed feelings for Dane Whitman, the Black Knight, but nothing physical came from it. These reasons have caused them to separate several times, egged on by Maximus taking credit for Pietro's descent into madness. One such reconciliation attempt occurred in a small town, in a rented cabin, where Crystal had to urge Quicksilver to "go slow". Unfortunately, even this was affected by outside forces.

=== Joining the Avengers ===
At one point, Crystal summoned the Avengers to help battle the Brethren. Soon after, she joined the Avengers as a provisional member. Shortly after that, she became a full Avengers member. During Crystal's time with the Avengers, Magneto's Acolytes kidnapped her daughter, causing great damage to the mansion. Luna ended up in Genosha under the control of the Acolytes. The Avengers teamed up with the X-Men and managed to recover her safely.

=== Decimation ===
After the events of House of M, Crystal was reunited with her depowered husband, only for him to steal the Terrigen Mist from Attilan, in an attempt to use it to restore the depowered mutants. He also kidnapped Luna and exposed her to the mists, granting her various abilities. Luna had previously been baseline human, thought of by some as an affront to her mutant heritage.

=== Silent War ===
When the Inhumans located Quicksilver, he allowed Black Bolt to beat him, in response to his betrayal. Crystal and Quicksilver's marriage was annulled and she participated in a series of battles against S.H.I.E.L.D. and the Mighty Avengers when the Inhumans declared war on United States.

=== Secret Invasion ===
Crystal and her sister Medusa are called upon by Iron Man to a meeting where he reveals Black Bolt has been replaced by a Skrull. When the Skrulls invade Attilan, Crystal uses her abilities to defeat a Skrull who possesses the powers of Colossus, Cyclops, and Wolverine, and a Skrull who is an amalgam of Captain America and Spider-Man. After an attack on Attilan by the Skrulls, the Royal Family travel into Kree space, seeking an alliance against the invading Skrulls. Ronan the Accuser welcomes this alliance, but only on the condition that Crystal becomes his bride. Medusa agrees, much to Crystal's chagrin.

In an attempt to crack the Skrull communication network, the Inhumans split up. Crystal and Medusa infiltrate Thundra's tribe as fellow tribeswomen. However, when they argue, per the tribe's laws, their squabble is moved to the arena. In their fight, Crystal gets Medusa to treat her more like an adult and allow her to speak to Thundra. She negotiates the release of a captured Skrull communications officer, enabling them to track down Black Bolt's prison.

=== War of Kings ===
Crystal's marriage to Ronan proceeds, even following Black Bolt's decision to usurp the throne of the Kree. She comes to accept the idea of the marriage, defending it to her sister-in-law Polaris as a matter of statecraft (though there are indications that Ronan wishes for more). The wedding proceedings are interrupted by the Shi'ar Imperial Guard, who attack as part of Emperor Vulcan's invasion of the Kree Imperium. Ronan is beaten nearly to death in this attack. While visiting Ronan in recuperation, Crystal inadvertently helps rally the Kree people when she shows compassion towards a ward filled with injured Kree commoners, acts which (thanks to her sister in law Polaris) were eventually broadcast over the Kree networks. This has led to her being referred to as the "people's princess" among some of the Kree people.

When Black Bolt attempted to set off an explosion that would spread the Terrigen Mists across the galaxy, reasoning that this action would render all equal, Crystal defied his orders and risked her life to take Lockjaw to confront him, disabling the Terrigen qualities of the explosion and convincing Black Bolt that the powers that would be created by his plan would cause more harm than good. Although Black Bolt acknowledged her wisdom, an attack by Vulcan meant that Black Bolt was kept too busy to accompany Crystal and Lockjaw when they were forced to flee before the bomb — now a simple explosive device — went off, apparently killing Black Bolt and Vulcan. After some time with Medusa ruling in Black Bolt's stead, he is resurrected and returns to the throne. Shortly thereafter, Black Bolt makes a decree that the Inhumans would return to Earth, leaving Ronan the Accuser in charge of the empire; Crystal is given the choice to leave with the royal family or stay by her husband. She decides to stay with family.

In Civil War II, Crystal and Medusa introduce the Inhuman Ulysses Cain to Captain Marvel, War Machine, and Black Panther. Crystal was present when Iron Man infiltrated New Attilan to claim Ulysses. Iron Man managed to defeat Crystal. She later joined Medusa, Karnak, and the other Inhumans with them in their trip to Stark Tower to reclaim Ulysses. During the confrontation with Iron Man, Crystal was present when Ulysses' latest vision projected to everyone present showing a rampaging Hulk standing over the corpses of the superheroes.

During the Inhumans vs. X-Men storyline, Crystal and Gorgon are ambushed by Magneto.

== Powers and abilities ==
Crystal arguing with her boyfriend Johnny Storm, from Fantastic Four #99. Art by Jack Kirby and Joe Sinnott.

Crystal is often described in her appearances as an elemental due to her unique ability to psionically control the four classical elements: air, earth, fire, and water. The character's proficiency in controlling these "elements" allows her to achieve a variety of effects and additional abilities. Her psionic powers are a result of exposure to the Terrigen Mists, which coupled with genetic engineering of the Inhumans by the Kree in the distant past, grant Inhumans abilities beyond the capabilities of an ordinary Inhuman that are unique to each individual.

=== Inhuman physiology ===
As a member of the fictional offshoot of humanity, Inhumans, Crystal possesses physical strength, durability, speed, endurance, and reflexes significantly greater than the maximum potential attainable by humans. Her physical prowess, coupled with combat training received from her cousin, Karnak, and the Avengers make her a formidable hand-to-hand combatant.

=== Air manipulation ===
Crystal can control oxygen atoms and oxygen-containing molecules to create atmospheric disturbances of various kinds. By intermingling air with earth she can cause a dust storm, air with water a typhoon, and air with fire a firestorm. She is able to create a wind of tornado intensity, approximately 115 miles per hour. She has demonstrated the ability to control air as far away as within a 30-mile radius. Using this ability, Crystal can summon wind currents strong enough to support her weight and others' and elevate herself to fly at high altitudes and speeds. By controlling air molecules, Crystal is able to bind them together psionically and compact them into a boundary to such a degree that matter cannot pass through. She uses this ability to various effects, including creating a field around her, allowing her to breathe while submerged in water and molten lava. She has also used this ability to deflect attacks and contain the atmosphere when the hull of a spaceship was compromised. She has demonstrated the ability to determine what may or may not pass through the barrier.

=== Earth manipulation ===
Crystal can control the various substances that make up common bedrock (earth: iron, granite, shale, limestone, etc.), creating seismic tremors of up to 6.7 on the Richter scale (greater if tectonic plate fault lines are nearby) by causing a sudden shifting of the earth. The upper limit of this power is unknown, although she has demonstrated the ability to lift the entire fictional city of Attilan for a significant amount of time. Her ability to control earth extends to many metals which are naturally occurring, including iron.

=== Fire manipulation ===
Crystal possesses the psionic ability to manipulate fire, cause it to grow in size and intensity, and take any form that she desires. She can also douse any oxidizing flame by altering the ionization potential of the outer electron shells of oxygen atoms. By accelerating oxygen molecules in the air, she is able to cause fire to spontaneously ignite.

=== Water manipulation ===
Further, Crystal can control the movement of water to a certain extent, via manipulation of inter-atomic van der Waals force controlling surface tension, divining water from the ground, and causing it to flow in designated directions. The maximum volume is unknown, although she has demonstrated the ability to create a maelstrom large and powerful enough to trap at least a dozen individuals, including Namor, and brought down what was described as "a sea from the sky," at least several thousand gallons. The character's control of water molecules extends to all of its forms, including ice. She is able to instantly freeze water to create ice blasts. She can also cause hydrogen and oxygen atoms in the air to recombine and form water molecules, summoning these atoms from a volume of atmosphere within a radius of approximately two miles. This allows her to spontaneously create water, even in a dry environment, provided oxygen and hydrogen are present.

=== Other elemental effects ===
Crystal possesses the ability to rearrange and manipulate the individual atoms of the elements that she controls to various effects. She is able to affect the elements she controls on an atomic level, giving them an electrical charge. Once the molecules are charged, she retains her control over them, allowing her to control the flow of the current, including the ability to summon lightning bolts. Her control over the elements at the atomic level also allows her to increase or decrease their molecular movement. This effectively allows her to instantly heat or cool the elements which she psionically controls. For example, she can instantly freeze water or ignite oxygen. By heating or cooling her surroundings, she is able to survive in environments of extreme heat or cold. She has demonstrated a limited capacity to manipulate the magnetic polarity of the metals she can psionically control. By combining her abilities to manipulate air, water, electricity, ice, and temperature, the character is able to effectively control the weather within a 30-mile radius. Also, because of her psionic connection to the elements around her, she has the ability to sense things an ordinary human or Inhuman would not, such as sensing how much moisture is contained within the air or other matter, being aware of movement in the air or water around herself, and being able to determine that a soil sample was not "native" to a particular area.

== Reception ==
=== Critical reception ===
Steve Morris of ComicsAlliance asserted, "Crystal's elemental powers offer infinite possibility, but her most important trait may be her pragmatism. She's the most aware and self-conscious member of the Inhumans, with a better handle on how to interact with other species than the rest of her family. As a result, she offers a fascinating counterpoint to the bigger-name Inhumans, and drives a more empathetic perspective for readers. She's smart, composed, and understanding; of course she was the one to drive the forging of relationships with the Fantastic Four and the Avengers." Sara Century of Syfy stated, "We like Crystal a lot because she is a character who tries to choose her own happiness, only to get shunted off into politically convenient arranged marriages off-planet at the drop of a hat by the people closest to her. ...For Crystal, the real love story is learning to love herself enough to say "no" to the demands of others."

=== Accolades ===
- In 2015, Entertainment Weekly ranked Crystal 62nd in their "Let's rank every Avenger ever" list.
- In 2015, Gizmodo ranked Crystal 49th in their "Every Member Of The Avengers" list.
- In 2016, ComicsAlliance ranked Crystal 5th in their "Marvel’s Royal Inhumans, Ranked From Worst To Best" list.
- In 2016, Screen Rant ranked Crystal 3rd in their "10 Most Powerful Inhumans In The Marvel Universe" list.
- In 2017, Screen Rant ranked Crystal 7th in their "Every Member Of The Fantastic Four, Ranked Worst To Best" list.
- In 2018, Comic Book Resources (CBR) ranked Crystal 7th in their "20 Most Powerful Inhumans" list.
- In 2018, Paste ranked Crystal 6th in their "20 Members of the Fantastic Four" list.
- In 2019, Screen Rant ranked Crystal 4th in their "15 Strongest Female Marvel Characters" list.
- In 2020, Scary Mommy included Crystal in their "These 195+ Marvel Female Characters Are Truly Heroic" list.
- In 2021, CBR ranked Crystal 8th in their "20 Most Powerful Female Members Of The Avengers" list.
- In 2021, Screen Rant ranked Crystal 1st in their "10 Best Alternate Members Of The Fantastic Four" list and ranked Crystal and Quicksilver 9th in their "10 Best Relationships in Avengers Comics" list.
- In 2022, CBR ranked Crystal 2nd in their "10 Best Fantastic Four Substitute Members" list, 6th in their "10 Inhumans Who Should Join The Avengers" list, and 10th in their "10 Best Sisters In Comics" list.

== Other versions ==
- Dream Crystal, a fusion of Crystal and DC Comics character Beautiful Dreamer, appears in the Amalgam Comics universe.
- An alternate universe version of Crystal appears in Marvel Zombies.
- An alternate universe version of Crystal appears in the Ultimate Marvel Universe.

== In other media ==
=== Television ===
- Crystal appears in The New Fantastic Four episode "Medusa and the Inhumans".
- Crystal appears in Fantastic Four (1994), voiced by Kathy Ireland. This version is Johnny Storm/Human Torch's girlfriend.
- Crystal appears in the Hulk and the Agents of S.M.A.S.H. episode "Inhuman Nature", voiced by Mary Faber. This version is A-Bomb's girlfriend.
- Crystal makes a non-speaking cameo appearance in the Ultimate Spider-Man episode "Agent Web".
- Crystal appears in Guardians of the Galaxy, voiced by Vanessa Marshall.
- Crystal appears in Avengers Assemble, voiced by Stephanie Sheh.
- Crystal appears in Inhumans, portrayed by Isabelle Cornish.
- Crystal appears in Marvel Future Avengers, voiced by Yuka Iguchi in Japanese and again by Stephanie Sheh in English.

=== Video games ===
- Crystal appears a playable character in Avengers in Galactic Storm.
- Crystal appears as a non-player character in Marvel: Ultimate Alliance, voiced by Kim Mai Guest.
- Crystal appears as a playable character in Marvel Avengers Alliance.
- Crystal appears as a playable character in Lego Marvel's Avengers, voiced by Gwendoline Yeo.
- Crystal appears as a playable character in Marvel: Future Fight.
- Crystal appears as a playable character in Lego Marvel Super Heroes 2.
- Crystal appears as a playable character in Marvel Powers United VR, voiced by Vanessa Marshall.
- Crystal appears as a playable character in Marvel Ultimate Alliance 3: The Black Order, voiced again by Mary Faber.
- Crystal appears as a playable character in Marvel Puzzle Quest.

=== Miscellaneous ===
Crystal appears in the Inhumans motion comic, voiced by Kelly Sheridan.
