= Doctor Minerva =

Fictional character appearing in Marvel Comics and related media

- Minerva as depicted in The Amazing Spider-Man vol. 3 #4 (December 2014). Art by Giuseppe Camuncoli.

Publication information
- Publisher: Marvel Comics
- First appearance: Captain Marvel #50 (May 1977)
- Created by: Scott Edelman; Al Milgrom

In-story information
- Alter ego: Minn-Erva
- Species: Kree mutate
- Team affiliations: Starforce
- Abilities: Superhuman strength, stamina, durability, speed, agility, reflexes, and intuition; Monstrous transformation; Heat vision; Invisibility; Flight; Expertise in aviation and genetics

Doctor Minerva (Minn-Erva) is a character appearing in American comic books published by Marvel Comics. Created by writer Scott Edelman and artist Al Milgrom, the character first appeared in Captain Marvel #50 (May 1977). Doctor Minerva works as a geneticist and is a member of the Kree race. She was an enemy of Mar-Vell (Captain Marvel) and later Quasar. She became the partner of Captain Atlas and a member of Kree superteam Starforce.

Gemma Chan portrayed the character in the Marvel Cinematic Universe film Captain Marvel (2019).

== Publication history ==
Doctor Minerva first appeared in Captain Marvel #50 (May 1977), created by writer Scott Edelman and artist Al Milgrom. She was introduced as a rogue scientist who wanted to mate with Mar-Vell, to create a new breed of Kree.

She reappeared two decades later as a villain in the Quasar comic, where it was revealed that she and her lover At-Lass had gained superpowers. They were also two of the villains in the Avengers storyline Operation: Galactic Storm, where they were in a team called Starforce. She resurfaced in the 2010s fighting both Spider-Man and Captain Marvel, in both comics it was shown she had gained powers to turn herself in a giant monster.

Doctor Minerva next appeared in the "Falling Star" story arc of 2019's Captain Marvel. During the story, it is revealed that she created the supervillain Star by combining human and Kree DNA in an attempt to create Kree super-soldiers.

== Fictional character biography ==
Minn-Erva was born in Edelix, on the planet Kree-Lar. She became a geneticist and an agent of the Kree empire, stationed on the Kree science cruiser Ananim. Minn-Erva abducts Rick Jones and lures Mar-Vell aboard the craft. She reveals to Mar-Vell her theory that the two of them could produce superior offspring capable of advancing the evolutionary potential of the Kree. Phae-Dor, head of the Kree science council, tells Minn-Erva to abandon her mission, but she refuses and is overpowered.

Doctor Minerva later became partner to Kree Captain Atlas, serving aboard the Kree light cruiser Ramatam. She incognito commissioned A.I.M. to steal Quasar's quantum-bands. She abducted Quasar and revealed to him how she was transformed by the Psyche-Magnetron. She rendezvoused with Captain Atlas, and tried to remove Quasar's quantum-bands, but was instead banished from Earth.

Doctor Minerva was a member of the Kree Starforce during the Kree/Shi'ar war.

During the "Spider-Verse" storyline, Minerva hires a group of human soldiers to assault a medical facility to steal a Terrigenesis cocoon containing an infant Inhuman. As they escape, Minerva is attacked by Ms. Marvel and the fight also draws Spider-Man's attention. Minerva reveals her plan of using the genetic material from Terrigenesis cocoons to create Kree super-soldiers and shows the early results of her work by transforming into a giant creature to attack the heroes. Minerva is forced to abandon her plan when Spider-Man threatens to inform Kree-Lar of her illegal activities.

Doctor Minerva returns to Earth during the "Civil War II" storyline. Carol Danvers, now acting as Captain Marvel and heading up Alpha Flight, engaged her in a brief battle in North Fork, California. Captain Marvel was unable to prevent her from unleashing a mutagenic virus on the inhabitants of North Fork, who are transformed into crustacean-like creatures. Minerva is imprisoned by a friendly faction of the Kree.

== Powers and abilities ==
Minn-Erva is a member of the alien Kree race, and was also mutagenically altered by the Kree Psyche-Magnetron, giving her superhuman strength and durability and the power of flight through the conscious manipulation of gravitons. The machine is capable of using "nega-energy" for various purposes, and was set to replicate the powers of Carol Danvers. She also possesses heightened intuitive faculties enabling her to guess correctly significantly higher than chance.

Minn-Erva is also a gifted geneticist, and is a graduate of the Kree Science Academy. She also has the ability to pilot various Kree starships, and the ability to operate high technology of the Kree.

Minerva later experimented on herself using the tissue of Terrigenesis cocoons. Minerva gained cloaking abilities and augmented physicality rivaling those of the new Captain Marvel even while in an unchanged state, coupled with extra abilities hearkened upon metamorphosis into a more monstrous form.

== Reception ==
=== Critical response ===
CBR.com ranked Doctor Minerva 8th in their "The Kree: The 10 Most Powerful Members Of The Race" list. Marc Buxton of Den of Geek ranked Doctor Minerva 43rd in their "Guardians of the Galaxy 3: 50 Marvel Characters We Want to See" list.

== In other media ==
=== Television ===
Minn-Erva appears in the Guardians of the Galaxy episode "Gotta Get Outta This Place", voiced by Marion Ross. This version is the elderly warden and prison therapist of the Kree Monument of Justice.

=== Film ===
Minn-Erva appears in Captain Marvel, portrayed by Gemma Chan. This version is a sniper in Yon-Rogg's Starforce team who bears a strong animosity towards teammate Carol Danvers. After the latter ends up on Earth, Minn-Erva accompanies Starforce to the planet to rescue her, where they discover a group of Skrull refugees and attempt to kill them. Having discovered the truth of the Kree's war with the Skrulls, Danvers fights off the rest of Starforce while Minn-Erva is shot down by Maria Rambeau.

=== Video games ===
- Minn-Erva appears as a playable character in Avengers in Galactic Storm.
- Minn-Erva appears as an unlockable playable character in Marvel Future Fight.
- Minn-Erva appears as an unlockable playable character in Marvel Strike Force.
