= Tana Nile =

- Tana Nile as depicted in Annihilation: The Nova Corps Files #1 (August 2006)

Publication information
- Publisher: Marvel Comics
- First appearance: (human form): Thor #129 (Jun 1966) (true form): Thor #131
- Created by: Stan Lee; Jack Kirby

In-story information
- Species: Rigellian
- Team affiliations: Colonizers of Rigel; Daydreamers; Graces
- Abilities: Self-density manipulation; Mind control

Tana Nile is a fictional character appearing in American comic books published by Marvel Comics.

== Publication history ==
Tana Nile first appeared in Thor #129 (June 1966), created by Stan Lee and Jack Kirby, and published by Marvel Comics. Ever since, Tana re-appeared intermittently in Marvel's Thor/Asgardian and cosmic stories and developed from antagonist to more nuanced roles.

== Fictional character biography ==
Tana Nile, of the planet Rigel-3, is a female member of the Colonizers of Rigel. In her attempt to colonize the planet Earth, Tana Nile takes a human form as Jane Foster's roommate. She attempts to take control of Earth, but is ordered to cease her attack. Tana leaves Earth to be given a new assignment and is told that the High Commissioner of Rigel has chosen her to be his wife.

Tana Nile later encounters Sif, Hildegarde, and sailor Silas Grant on the Blackworld planet while battling Ego-Prime. She reveals that Ego-Prime is a slab that she had removed from Ego the Living Planet and intended for use in terraforming Blackworld, but grew beyond her control. Blackworld is destroyed in a nuclear war, and Tana and her allies fled to Earth. Tana assumes a human form to live on Earth, becoming an ally of Thor and the Asgardians.

Tana visits Charles Xavier's Massachusetts Academy to learn more about human beings. During an adventure in an alternate dimension created by Franklin Richards, she falls in love with Howard the Duck. After a spontaneous kiss, Howard tells her of his attachment to Beverly Switzler and she accepts that romance with him is inappropriate.

During the Annihilation storyline, Tana Nile frames Ronan the Accuser for the House of Fiyero in exchange for information on Ronan. He promises to hunt her down, along with others involved in the trial, to discover the true reason behind his dismissal. Tana Nile later joins Gamora's Graces, a collection of super-powered women from across the galaxy. The Graces, along with much of known space, comes under threat by Annihilus' Annihilation Wave, during which Tana is killed.

== Powers and abilities ==
Tana Nile is an alien with the ability to manipulate her own density and control the minds of others. She wields armor that enables her to disguise herself as a human, a "stasis gun" that can project concussive energy or intense heat, and a wrist-mounted communicator.

== In other media ==
- Tana Nile makes a non-speaking appearance in The Super Hero Squad Show episode "Tremble at the Might of...M.O.D.O.K.!".
- Tana Nile appears in the Ultimate Spider-Man episode "Guardians of the Galaxy", voiced by Grey DeLisle.
- Tana Nile appears in Guardians of the Galaxy, voiced by Jessica DiCicco. This version is the daughter of the Grand Commissioner of Rigel. After she flees from Rigel-3 to avoid the Rigellians' coming-of-age ritual called the Centering, which would strip her of emotions in exchange for enhanced psychic abilities, the Grand Commissioner hires the Guardians of the Galaxy to retrieve her. Tana later returns to Rigel-3 to lead the Rigellians into an era of compassion and better understanding.
