= Kismet (Marvel Comics) =

Marvel Comics fictional character

- Her (center) on the cover of Alpha Flight #97 (June 1991). Art by Jackson Guice.

Publication information
- Publisher: Marvel Comics
- First appearance: As Paragon: The Incredible Hulk vol. 2 Annual #6 (1977); As Her/Kismet: Marvel Two-in-One #61 (March 1980); As Ayesha: Fantastic Four Vol. 3 #11 (1998)
- Created by: Len Wein (writer); David Kraft; Herb Trimpe (artist)

In-story information
- Notable aliases: Paragon; Her; Ayesha
- Abilities: Superhuman strength and durability; Energy blasts; Flight; Vacuum adaptation; Regeneration

Kismet (/ˈkɪzmɪt, -mɛt, ˈkɪs-/), also known as Paragon, Her, and Ayesha (/aɪˈiːʃə/), is a character appearing in American comic books published by Marvel Comics. She exists in Marvel's main shared universe, known as the Marvel Universe.

Ayesha appeared in the Marvel Cinematic Universe films Guardians of the Galaxy Vol. 2 and Guardians of the Galaxy Vol. 3 (2023), portrayed by Elizabeth Debicki.

== Publication history ==
The character first appeared as Paragon in The Incredible Hulk vol. 2 Annual #6 and was created by Len Wein, David Kraft, and Herb Trimpe. She first appeared as Her and Kismet in Marvel Two-in-One #61, while Ayesha first appeared in Fantastic Four vol. 3 #11.

== Fictional character biography ==
Originally known as Paragon, Kismet is the second attempt by the Enclave to artificially create a super-powerful being in their Citadel of Science "the Beehive". Their first attempt was Him, later known as Adam Warlock. The Enclave intended to create a super-powerful being to control. "Born" before being fully formed, Paragon appears as a muscular male figure. Paragon battles the Hulk, then overrides the Enclave's control and sinks their Beehive headquarters before incubating itself in a cocoon much like Warlock.

Paragon emerges from her cocoon in a feminine, golden-skinned form. As a female replicant of Warlock, she takes the name of Her (a reference to Warlock's original name, Him) and seeks out Warlock to mate with him. However, Warlock had died some years earlier. Confident she would be able to revive Warlock, Her manages to restore and reanimate his body. However, she is unable to restore Warlock's mind or soul and is forced to return him to his grave. She sets out to explore the cosmos to find a possible mate.

Some time after beginning her quest to find Warlock, Her discovers that Warlock has been resurrected with his soul intact. However, he rejects her, leaving her heartbroken. After this, Her holds a competition among some of the most powerful men on Earth, attaching reproductive pods to their necks to see how they would react. She selects Quasar, Hercules, Wonder Man, Hyperion, Doc Samson, and Forgotten One for this task. Her battles Quasar and is attacked by Jack of Hearts, but is saved by Quasar from Moondragon. As Quasar is the only one who did not destroy his pod, Her turns her attentions to him for a time, until Quasar's girlfriend Kayla Ballantine (in possession of the Star Brand) severely beats her and forces her to return to cocoon form to heal. However, Her decides to become Quasar's companion for a time. During her adventures with Quasar, Her takes the name Kismet, after the Arabic word for fate.

== Powers and abilities ==
Kismet is an artificial being created through genetic engineering by the Enclave. She has the ability to tap, store, and manipulate cosmic energy for a variety of effects, including the projection of concussive force bolts and flight. The cosmic energy enhances her physical attributes to superhuman levels, and enhances her metabolism and her life force, preventing her from aging, and making her virtually immortal. She can recover from serious injuries by creating a cosmic energy cocoon from surrounding molecules in which she can rest and regenerate. She can reanimate dead tissue by projecting a portion of her cosmic life force into it. Kismet cannot restore a being's spirit (astral self) to a body that she resurrects if that spirit has left the body. She also has the ability to use cosmic energy to rearrange molecular structures (of about three cubic feet at a time).

== Other versions ==
In Earth-691, an alternate universe home to the Guardians of the Galaxy, Kismet is the mother of Stakar Ogord (Starhawk).

== In other media ==
=== Marvel Cinematic Universe ===
Elizabeth Debicki as Ayesha in Guardians of the Galaxy Vol. 2.

Ayesha appears in media set in the Marvel Cinematic Universe (MCU), portrayed by Elizabeth Debicki. This version is the high priestess of the Sovereign.

- Ayesha is introduced in Guardians of the Galaxy Vol. 2 (2017). After Rocket of the Guardians of the Galaxy steals from her, she vows revenge on them.
- Ayesha appears in Guardians of the Galaxy Vol. 3, portrayed again by Elizabeth Debicki. She and her creation, Adam, continue to seek revenge on the Guardians until she is killed by the Sovereign's creator, the High Evolutionary.

=== Video games ===
A hybridized incarnation of Ayesha appears as a playable character in Lego Marvel Super Heroes 2, voiced by Olivia Mace. This version has the appearance and personality of the MCU incarnation and the abilities and origin of her comic book counterpart.
