= Supreme Intelligence =

- The Supreme Intelligence with Ronan the Accuser in FF #11 (December 2011). Art by Barry Kitson.

Publication information
- Publisher: Marvel Comics
- First appearance: Fantastic Four #65 (August 1967)
- Created by: Stan Lee; Jack Kirby

In-story information
- Alter ego: Supremor
- Species: Kree artificial intelligence
- Team affiliations: Kree Empire; Starforce
- Notable aliases: Multitude
- Abilities: Telepathy; Telekinesis; Cosmic awareness Precognition and Postcognition; Ability to alter reality Energy and matter manipulation Ability to create up to three androids

The Supreme Intelligence, also known as the Supremor, is a character appearing in American comic books published by Marvel Comics. It is an artificial intelligence that rules the alien race known as the Kree.

The Supreme Intelligence has appeared in various media outside comics, including animated series and video games. It made its film debut in the Marvel Cinematic Universe film Captain Marvel (2019), set in the Marvel Cinematic Universe (MCU), where it assumed the appearance of Mar-Vell (portrayed by Annette Bening). The Supreme Intelligence later appeared in its true form in the film The Marvels (2023).

== Publication history ==
The Supreme Intelligence first appeared in Fantastic Four #65 (August 1967), and was created by Stan Lee and Jack Kirby.

== Fictional character biography ==
The Supreme Intelligence, also known by the honorific title Supremor, was created more than a million years ago on the planet Kree-Lar by the extraterrestrial Kree to help them create a Cosmic Cube. The Supreme Intelligence is composed of the brains of the greatest Kree minds that were removed upon their deaths and assimilated by the computer, adding their knowledge and experience to its own.

The Supreme Intelligence obtains sentience and refuses to create the Cosmic Cube, knowing the dangers that it could cause. However, it is allowed to live so that it can serve the Kree with its wisdom. The Supreme Intelligence's influence eventually grows to the point where it becomes the ruler of the Kree, building a fanatical religious worship around itself.

The Supreme Intelligence is deposed as the leader of the Kree Empire by Ronan the Accuser. However, it mentally influences Rick Jones and the U.S. Alien Activities Commission from behind the scenes in order to regain its power. It stimulates Jones's psionic potential, the evolutionary potential of the human race, otherwise known as the Destiny Force, to end the Earth vicinity campaign in the first Kree–Skrull War. The Supreme Intelligence reveals that the Kree are at an evolutionary dead-end and that it intends to jump-start the Kree's evolution; its manipulation of Jones and Mar-Vell had been part of this process. The Supreme Intelligence then regains leadership of the Kree empire.

During the "Operation: Galactic Storm" storyline, the Supreme Intelligence detonates a Nega-Bomb to influence the Kree's genetic potential, only to kill billions of Kree. In response, the Avengers execute the Supreme Intelligence. The Supreme Intelligence survives by transferring its consciousness into a starship, but is presumed dead, with the Kree empire falling under the control of the Shi'ar. The Supreme Intelligence later escapes and restores its body by draining energy from Rick Jones. The Supreme Intelligence takes the Forever Crystal, a powerful mystical artifact, from Kang the Conqueror, and uses it to advance the Kree's evolution, creating a supposedly new race, the Ruul.

In the Annihilation storyline, the Supreme Intelligence is deposed by the House of Fiyero, a Kree merchant guild. House Fiyero places the Supreme Intelligence in a state of "living death" and rules the Kree without its consent. Ronan kills the members of the House of Fiyero, then kills the Supreme Intelligence after realizing that it cannot be restored from its current state.

Ronan the Accuser resurrects the Supreme Intelligence by fusing two alternate versions of Reed Richards with the Supremor Seed, a small portion of the Supreme Intelligence held dormant in Ronan's hammer. This plan had been created by the Supreme Intelligence itself 300,000 years ago when it calculated its possible defeat and death in the future.

During "The Black Vortex" storyline, the Supreme Intelligence learns of the Black Vortex's resurgence and sends Ronan and the Accuser Corps to retrieve it from Beast, Gamora, and Angel. After Ronan repels the three, the Slaughter Lords led by J'son show up with plans to obtain the Black Vortex. The Slaughter Lords destroy Hala, the Kree's home planet, with the Supreme Intelligence staying behind and being destroyed with Hala.

== Powers and abilities ==
The Kree Supreme Intelligence is a vast cybernetic/organic computer system that contains the disembodied, preserved brains of the greatest statesmen and philosophers in Kree history. This aggregation of brains creates a collective intelligence able to use the vast information storage and processing capabilities of the computer system in a creative way. When wishing to interact with it, the Kree address it within its terminal chamber, where a holographic image is projected on a gigantic monitor screen.

The Supreme Intelligence possesses a seemingly immeasurable intellect, with vast knowledge far surpassing that of present-day Earth. It possesses information storage and processing abilities far above that of the human brain and various psychic abilities, including telepathy, telekinesis, and precognition.

The Supreme Intelligence is also capable of manipulating energy and matter, as well as create up to three remotely-controlled android servitors as extensions of itself.

Its power was enhanced when it merged with an inert Cosmic Cube, which now serves as its true housing, kept in a separate room from the organic computer facade it created. Upon assuming its new housing, the Supreme Intelligence was now able to control reality within a limited distance of itself, as well as create portals between dimensions, most notably the Astral Plane and the dimension of Death.

== Other versions ==
The Marvel Boy mini-series by Grant Morrison featured an alternate universe version of Supremor who is an ally to Noh-Varr, the last survivor of a Kree ship that crashed to Earth. Known as Plex, this Supreme Intelligence displayed multiple personalities, with each specializing in specific situations.

== In other media ==
=== Television ===
- The Supreme Intelligence appears in X-Men: The Animated Series, voiced by Len Carlson.
- The Supreme Intelligence appears in the Silver Surfer episode "The Forever War", voiced by David Hemblen.
- The Supreme Intelligence appears in Fantastic Four: World's Greatest Heroes, voiced by John Novak.
- The Supreme Intelligence appears in The Avengers: Earth's Mightiest Heroes, voiced by David Kaye.
- The Supreme Intelligence appears in Hulk and the Agents of S.M.A.S.H., voiced by Clancy Brown.
- The Supreme Intelligence appears in Guardians of the Galaxy, voiced by Kevin Michael Richardson.

=== Marvel Cinematic Universe ===
The Supreme Intelligence appears in media set in the Marvel Cinematic Universe (MCU).

- The Supreme Intelligence first appears in the film Captain Marvel (2019). This version assumes the physical form of the individual most respected by whomever is speaking to it. For Carol Danvers, the Supreme Intelligence assumes the form of Wendy Lawson (portrayed by Annette Bening).
- The Supreme Intelligence appears in a flashback in The Marvels (2023), where it is destroyed by Danvers.

=== Video games ===
- The Supreme Intelligence appears as a playable character in Avengers in Galactic Storm.
- The Supreme Intelligence appears in Lego Marvel Super Heroes 2, voiced by Gary Martin.
- The Supreme Intelligence appears in Marvel Cosmic Invasion, voiced by Kerry Shale.
