= Quasar (character) =

Marvel Comics superhero

- Wendell Vaughn and Phyla-Vell, two versions of Quasar
- Publisher: Marvel Comics
- First appearance: Wendell Vaughn (as Quasar): The Incredible Hulk (vol. 2) #234 (April 1979); Phyla-Vell (as Quasar): Annihilation #6 (March 2007); Richard Rider (as Quasar): Nova (vol. 4) #23 (May 2009); Avril Kincaid: Captain America: Sam Wilson #7 (May 2016)
- Created by: Wendell Vaughn: Don Glut, Roy Thomas, John Buscema; Avril Kincaid: Nick Spencer, Angel Unzueta
- Characters: Wendell Elvis Vaughn; Phyla-Vell; Richard Rider; Avril Kincaid

Quasar
- : Quasar #1 (October 1989). Featuring the Wendell Vaughn version of the character. Art by Paul Ryan

Series publication information
- Publisher: Marvel Comics
- Schedule: Monthly
- Format: Ongoing series
- Genre: Superhero
- Publication date: October 1989 – July 1994
- Number of issues: 60
- Main character(s): Wendell Vaughn

Quasar is the name of several superheroes appearing in American comic books published by Marvel Comics. They are noted for having worn the Quantum Bands, advanced ancient alien technology that grants the wearer manipulation of quantum energy.

== Fictional character biography ==
=== Wendell Vaughn ===
Wendell Vaughn is the longest-running Quasar character, and the first to use the name. Wendell Vaughn was born in Fond du Lac, Wisconsin. He graduated from S.H.I.E.L.D. Academy. Although considered highly capable by his superiors, they nonetheless deem him unfit for field work, sensing that Vaughn lacked the necessary "killer instinct"—the will to win at all costs.

Vaughn's first assignment is security detail for a research facility where a team of scientists were performing experiments on the Quantum Bands taken from the deceased Crusader. A test pilot selected to wear the bands proves successful at wielding them, but he perishes when the energy output reaches a critical mass beyond his control. Vaughn dons the bands when the criminal scientists A.I.M. launch a full-scale assault on the facility. Using the bands' power to generate solid energy constructs, he repulses the attack. When the energy buildup begins to overwhelm him, he decides to simply relax and "go with the flow". To his surprise, the buildup abruptly dissipates. Vaughn realizes the key to wielding the bands is a flexible will, rather than an indomitable, uncompromising one. Ultimately, his lack of a killer instinct makes him a more suitable wielder of the bands.

=== Phyla-Vell ===
Phyla-Vell becomes Quasar for a time after taking the Quantum Bands from Annihilus.

=== Richard Rider ===
To keep him from dying while deprived of the Nova Force, Rider temporarily takes the Quantum Bands from Vaughn, thus becoming Quasar.

=== Avril Kincaid ===
Avril Kincaid is a S.H.I.E.L.D. agent who debuted during the Avengers: Standoff! storyline. While working at Pleasant Hill, a gated community holding super villains brainwashed by Kobik, Kincaid runs a daycare center as her cover. When Helmut Zemo and Fixer regain their memories and start a riot, Kincaid is attacked by the Blood Brothers, but is saved by Captain America and Winter Soldier. After Captain America shuts down the security system at the Pleasant Hill Museum, Kincaid enters it and encounters the curator, a retired Wendell Vaughn. As part of a contingency plan for if S.H.I.E.L.D. ever lost control of Kobik, Vaughn gives the Quantum Bands to Kincaid. In the aftermath of the events that transpired at Pleasant Hill, Kincaid becomes the new Quasar, with Vaughn acting as her mentor.

She is seemingly killed in Secret Empire #0, but it is later revealed that is in a comatose state. When she awakens, she destroys the planetary shield that the Hydra Steve Rogers has been using to keep some of Earth's most powerful heroes off-planet. However, this act seemingly costs Kincaid her life, with Captain Marvel stating that Kincaid died after bringing down the shield.

After Kincaid's apparent death, Wendell Vaughn reassumes the Quasar mantle. After becoming trapped in a black hole, Vaughn catches a glimpse of Kincaid, who is still alive, but lost somewhere in space.

== Powers and abilities ==
Quantum Bands used in the promotional art for Annihilation: Nova #3 (August 2006), by Gabriele Dell'Otto

The Quasars' powers are derived from the pair of Quantum Bands attached to the bearer's wrists. Foremost among the bands' powers is the ability to tap into a limitless energy source called the "Quantum Zone". Quasars can project quantum energy in the form of devastating beams of force or heat. Vaughn more commonly employs them to fashion durable constructs of solid energy, such as containment spheres or pincers. He protects himself with a personal force field of quantum energy. The Quantum Bands can also exert control over many other types of energy that are part of the electromagnetic spectrum.

It is possible to create apertures into and out of the Quantum Zone, thus allowing passage through its infinite, featureless expanse. Vaughn mainly uses this ability to traverse interstellar distances in a manner similar to hyperspace travel, which he refers to as a "Quantum Jump". A Quantum Jump has a destructive side effect on the local environment, violently upheaving gravity and tearing holes in the atmosphere (on Earth, it would damage the ozone layer). Vaughn initially refrains from using this ability except when in space or in dire circumstances, but eventually discovers that he can prevent this effect by surrounding himself with a barrier of solid energy before jumping. It is also possible to shunt matter into the Quantum Zone, provided that the Quasar is in physical contact with it.

The Quantum Bands enable their wearer to fly by manipulating gravitons. The maximum obtainable flight speed is unknown, but Vaughn once made a trip from Earth to Uranus in approximately four years flying non-stop.

The Quantum Bands' gems possess some capability to analyze and process information as if they were extremely advanced computers. This makes it possible to navigate the Quantum Zone and the depths of space. The gems are able to detect, analyze, and track energy emissions across vast distances. They can also "program" Quasars' quantum energy to register and react to certain preset conditions. For instance, at one time Vaughn had the Earth surrounded with an invisible lattice-work of energy that was designed to act as a global alert system against potential extraterrestrial threats. The energy field could detect any surges of exotic energy emanating from the planet's surface and any object larger than a micrometeorite passing through it; in either case, the field would react by transmitting an alert signal to the Quantum Bands.

== In other media ==
=== Television ===
The Phyla-Vell incarnation of Quasar appears in The Avengers: Earth's Mightiest Heroes episode "Michael Korvac", voiced by Moira Quirk.

=== Video games ===
- The Wendell Vaughn incarnation of Quasar appears in Lego Marvel's Avengers.
- The Phyla-Vell incarnation of Quasar appears in Disney Infinity 2.0.
- The Wendell Vaughn and Avril Kincaid incarnations of Quasar appear as playable characters in Marvel: Future Fight.
- The Phyla-Vell incarnation of Quasar appears in Disney Infinity 3.0.
