= List of Marvel Comics characters: S =

== S'Yan ==
S'Yan is the brother of T'Chaka and the uncle of T'Challa. The character, created by Reginald Hudlin and John Romita Jr., first appeared in Black Panther (vol. 4) #2 (March 2005). When T'Chaka is killed by Klaw, S'Yan rules Wakanda as a regent until T'Challa comes of age. During the tournament to detail who should become the next Black Panther, S'Yan is defeated by T'Challa, who takes on the Black Panther mantle. S'Yan remains close to T'Challa as one of his advisors.

In the storyline Doomwar, S'Yan is killed while protecting Ramonda from Doctor Doom's forces.

=== S'Yan in other media ===
S'Yan appears in Black Panther (2010), voiced by Carl Lumbly.

== Sabreclaw ==
Sabreclaw (Hudson Logan) is a character appearing in American comic books published by Marvel Comics who first appeared in J2 #8 (May 1999). He is the half-brother of Wild Thing and son of Wolverine.

The character has claws (similar to Sabretooth), a healing factor, and enhanced physical capabilities. His healing factor allows him to rapidly regenerate damaged or destroyed areas of his cellular structure and affords him virtual immunity to poisons and most drugs, as well as enhanced resistance to diseases. He has superhuman strength, naturally sharp fangs, and claws reinforced with adamantium sheaths.

== Neal Saroyan ==
Neal Saroyan is the former talent agent of Wonder Man. Saroyan is later revealed to be an assassin with mind-control powers and is killed by a rival group of assassins. The character, created by Gerard Jones and Jeff Johnson, first appeared in Wonder Man (vol. 2) #1 (July 1991).

== Savage Steel ==
Savage Steel is a name used by several characters appearing in American comic books published by Marvel Comics.

Disillusioned by the justice system and what they viewed as its lenient stance on crime, a number of New York City Police Department officers came together to form an organization that would kill criminals, rather than simply jailing them. Calling themselves the "Cabal," the group commissioned Stane International to give them an edge in their crusade. Stane's company designed and manufactured a suit of powered armor, the "Savage Steel" battle-suit, based on technology stolen from Stark Enterprises. Different members of the Cabal all took turns wearing the suit, including Paul Trent and former members Harry Lennox, Johnny Leone, and Jimmy Zafar. Zafar later reformed and became an ally of Darkhawk.

== Rafael Scarfe ==
- Further reading: Rafael Scarfe at the Comic Book DB (archived from the original); Rafael Scarfe at the Grand Comics Database

Lt. Rafael 'Rafe' Scarfe is a character appearing in American comic books published by Marvel Comics. The character, created by Chris Claremont and Pat Broderick, first appeared in Marvel Premiere #23 (August 1975).

Scarfe is a Vietnam War veteran who returned to New York to become a police officer. He grew close to his partner Misty Knight and when she lost her arm in a bomb explosion, Scarfe never left her side. He was a recurring ally of Iron Fist, and later Luke Cage when the two came together to form Heroes for Hire. Years later, in the "Shadowland" storyline, Scarfe later went rogue and tried to frame Daredevil for the murder of several criminals.

=== Rafael Scarfe in other media ===
Rafael Scarfe appears in Luke Cage, portrayed by Frank Whaley. This version is a corrupt NYPD detective at the 29th Precinct partnered with Misty Knight who secretly works for Cornell "Cottonmouth" Stokes. After internal affairs begin investigating him, Scarfe attempts to blackmail Stokes, who fatally shoots him.

== Scaleface ==
Scaleface is a mutant and a member of the Morlocks who can transform into a dragon-like reptilian creature. After the Morlock Massacre storyline, Scaleface, Blowhard, Berzerker, and Masque confront Iceman and Beast, falsely believing that they are threatening Leech and Caliban. A fight breaks out, with Leech neutralizing the powers on both sides. Eventually, the group calms down with the urging of Scaleface. As a group, they join with the remnants of X-Factor and make their way to safety.

Dissatisfied with the conditions at X-Factor's HQ, the Morlocks sneak out, disguised and claiming to be the X-Factor 'cleaning staff'. Scaleface and the Morlocks are confronted by the police, who shoot and kill Scaleface.

=== Scaleface in other media ===
- Scaleface makes cameo appearances in X-Men: The Animated Series.
  - Scaleface appears in X-Men '97.
- Scaleface makes a cameo appearance in the X-Men: Evolution episode "X-Treme Measures".

== Scanner ==
Scanner is the name of several characters appearing in American comic books published by Marvel Comics.

=== Skera or Vera ===
Scanner was a member of the Spaceknight Squadron beginning in Rom Annual (1982 Series), #2 in November 1983, in which she was also called Skera. In later issues, she was called Vera.

=== Sarah Ryall ===
Sarah Ryall is a mutant character created by Bob Harras and Steve Epting, first appearing in Avengers (Vol. 1) #357 (October, 1992). She has bio-electrical abilities, allowing her to affect neural pathways, sense astral forms, and project herself as a hologram.

Sarah (initially known as Screener) was recruited by Fabian Cortez into the Acolytes. She later took the name of Scanner. She was one of the few Acolytes to survive the destruction of Avalon as well as Genosha. Scanner lost her powers following M-Day.

=== Scanner in other media ===
The Sarah Ryall incarnation of Scanner makes non-speaking appearances in Wolverine and the X-Men.

== Schizoid Man ==
The Schizoid Man is the name of several characters appearing in American comic books published by Marvel Comics.

=== Chip Martin ===
The original version of the Schizoid Man, Chip Martin, first appeared in Peter Parker, The Spectacular Spider-Man #36 (November 1979), and was created by Bill Mantlo, John Romita Jr. and Jim Mooney.

A graduate student at Empire State University, he suffers from psychological instability and has the power to build and animate solid constructs with his mind. His father is Senator Robert Martin, a possible suspect as the Hobgoblin.

Schizoid Man joins Vil-Anon, a twelve-step program dedicated to helping individuals overcome their criminal tendencies, alongside Armadillo, Equinox, Hypno-Hustler, Jackson Weele and Man-Bull.

=== Ultimate Marvel version ===
The Ultimate Marvel equivalent of Schizoid Man is an unnamed genetically-modified French citizen and a member of the Liberators who was enhanced with Multiple Man's stem cells, allowing him to clone himself.

== Schwarzschild ==
Schwarzschild is a former member of the anti-mutant organization Orchis. He underwent experimentation from the mutant supremacist organization 3K, who implanted him with artificial mutant abilities. Schwarzschild gained the ability to generate a miniature black hole that floats above his body and allows him to manipulate gravity.

In a potential future depicted in Age of Revelation, Schwarzschild is one of the few surviving members of the X-Men. After learning of Schwarzschild's future self, Beast attempts to have Schwarzschild killed to prevent him from betraying 3K. Unbeknownst to 3K, Schwarzschild survives, but is left comatose.

== Eric Schwinner ==
Eric Schwinner is a scientist at GARID (Galannan Alternative Research for Immunization Development). He first appeared in Amazing Fantasy #15 (August 1962). Schwinner ran the public demonstration that led to Peter Parker being bit by a radioactive spider. He works with Peter in the lab to understand the radioactive spiders, as well as to defeat Tendril, an escaped patient with mutated powers.

=== Eric Schwinner in other media ===
Eric Schwinner appears in the Spider-Man episode "The Origin of Spider-Man".

== Scimitar ==
Scimitar is a character appearing in American comic books published by Marvel Comics. Created by writer Chris Claremont and artist John Byrne, the character first appeared in Iron Fist #5 (March 1976). Scimitar is a master of bladed weapons, serving under Master Khan. He is a mercenary initially hired by the sorcerer to eliminate Iron Fist, and later a recurring adversary of the superhero.

Scimitar is a mercenary from Halwan and an enemy of Iron Fist. Little is known about his past, except that his name has been used by many other people in Halwan.

In his first appearance, Scimitar kills several civilians to lure Iron Fist out of hiding. The plan works and Iron Fist defeats him. He has a few more run-ins with Iron Fist and his partner Luke Cage, but always ends up defeated. Scimitar remains absent for a time until returning in the 1990s Iron Fist limited series.

Scimitar later joins the Weaponeers, a terrorist group who use him as a "super-agent". Scimitar resurfaces with the Weaponeers in Zanzibar and attempts to kill its president, a retired superhero. Thanks to X-Men member Warren Worthington III and his allies from Genosha, Scimitar and the Weaponeers are defeated. Scimitar and the Weaponeers are then defeated by the X-Men shortly before the beginning of House of M.

=== Scimitar in other media ===
Scimitar appears in The Incredible Hulk episode "The Lost Village", voiced by Tom Kane. This version is a cyborg who previously lived in the Tibetan town of Anavrin before being banished by his father Tong Zing.

== Scintilla ==
- First appearance: Uncanny X-Men #107 (October 1977)
- Created by: Chris Claremont and Dave Cockrum
- Species: Unidentified extraterrestrial race
- Teams: Imperial Guard
- Abilities: Shrinking from normal size to five percent of her normal size (and any size in between)

Scintilla (originally named Midget) is a character appearing in American comic books published by Marvel Comics. Created by Chris Claremont and Dave Cockrum, the character first appeared in Uncanny X-Men #107 (October 1977). A member of the Shi'ar Imperial Guard, Scintilla has the ability to shrink to five percent of her normal size, and any size in between. Like many original members of the Imperial Guard, Scintilla is the analog of a character from DC Comics' Legion of Super-Heroes: in her case, Salu Digby (Shrinking Violet).

Midget is renamed Scintilla during Operation: Galactic Storm, an intergalactic war between the Shi'ar and the Kree. The Imperial Guard help the Sh'iar create the Nega-Bomb, a doomsday weapon that kills most of the Kree.

== Scorn ==
- First appearance: Carnage #1 (December 2010; Tanis Nieves); Carnage #4 (June 2011; Scorn)
- Created by: Zeb Wells; Clayton Crain
- Species: Human bonded to Symbiote
- Abilities: Can fuse with technology.
- Further reading: Scorn at the Comic Book DB (archived from the original)

Scorn (Tanis Nieves) is a character appearing in American comic books published by Marvel Comics. Tanis Nieves first appeared in Carnage #1 (December 2010), while the Scorn symbiote first appeared in Carnage #4 (June 2011). Scorn is usually depicted as a violet symbiote that can integrate with non-organic machinery.

After Carnage was ripped in half by the Sentry outside the Earth's atmosphere, it is later discovered that Carnage survived and returned to Earth, where it was discovered by Michael Hall. He recruited Shriek to keep Carnage alive and use it to create prosthetic limbs and exo-suits similar to a symbiote. Shriek's host, Tanis Nieves, is outfitted with one of these arms, which eventually spawns Scorn.

In Carnage Born, it is revealed that Scorn had founded a cult worshiping Knull. She with her followers retrieve the Grendel symbiote's remnants from the Maker, along with Cletus Kasady's body. Scorn offers herself to Kasady, so he could absorb Carnage's remnants left in her body, but Kasady kills her instead.

=== Scorn in other media ===
- Scorn appears in the Spider-Man series finale "Maximum Venom", voiced by Kylee Russell. This version is Venom's older sister who was created by Knull to serve as a member of the Symbiote Sisters alongside Scream and Mania and possesses a host with shapeshifting capabilities.
- The Tanis Nieves incarnation of Scorn appears as a playable character in Spider-Man Unlimited.
- Scorn appears in Venom: The Last Dance, portrayed by Jade Nicholson-Lamb. This version is captured along with other symbiotes by the government organization Imperium after landing on Earth. Scorn later bonds with lab technician Jade Clark to battle the Xenophages before being killed by one.

== Scorpia ==
Scorpia (Elaine Coll) is a character appearing in American comic books published by Marvel Comics.

Elaine is recruited by Silvermane from a mental hospital to become the new Scorpion. She opts to call herself Scorpia instead and is given robotic scorpion-like armor which enhanced her strength and speed by 500%. Scorpia successfully brings Deathlok to Silvermane and is ordered to ambush Spider-Man and Daredevil, who had infiltrated their base. She wears them down but is then betrayed by Silvermane, who shoots her in the back. Scorpia follows Spider-Man and Daredevil to Silvermane's location and immediately attacks him. Mainframe, another of Silvermane's mercenaries, takes control of Scorpia's cybernetic enhancements and uses her to attack Spider-Man. However, she soon regained mobility and blasts Silvermane. An explosion created by the Punisher knocked Scorpia off the building they were on, but Deathlok saved her. She then decided to flee the area rather than be put in prison.

In later appearances, Scorpia joins the Sinister Six and the Sinister Syndicate.

== Scorpion ==
Scorpion is the name of several characters appearing in American comic books published by Marvel Comics.

=== Jim Evans ===
Jim Evans is a successful apothecary in Dustville during the Old West. He began to date Sarah (the prettiest girl in town) until she began to neglect him upon stating that she already has a boyfriend in Matt Cody. Cody was not pleased that Sarah went out with Evans and challenged him to a shootout. Evans drew his gun first and only managed to wing Cody in the left arm as Cody managed to shoot Evans's gun out of his hand. Cody then made Evans dance with his gun. Evans was humiliated and vowed revenge, becoming the Scorpion and wielding paralyzing bullets. After six months in jail, Evans escapes and takes on the alias of Sting-Ray before being defeated by the Phantom Rider.

=== Ultimate Marvel character ===
The first Ultimate Marvel incarnation of the Scorpion is one of the clones of Peter Parker's clones. Dressed like a scorpion and attacking the mall, he was revealed to be a mentally unstable clone who was fitted into a green armored suit. The Scorpion additionally had a mechanical tail grafted onto his spine that had the ability to shoot acid. The Scorpion was eventually subdued by Spider-Man and taken to the Fantastic Four who eventually gave the clone to S.H.I.E.L.D. Afterwards, Nick Fury tells subordinates to "get to work" while walking out of the room the clone is being held in.

=== Kron Stone ===
See below.

=== Jefferson Davis ===
Jefferson Davis takes on the Scorpion name in Earth-65. He wears an electrically charged suit, carries a scorpion-themed staff and possesses some limited super-speed. Jefferson works for the organization S.I.L.K. and fought Spider-Gwen (on behalf of Matt Murdock), Silk, and Spider-Woman.

=== Scorpion in other media ===
- An original incarnation of the Scorpion appears in The Amazing Spider-Man. This version is a scorpion-human hybrid created by Otto Octavius.
  - As of The Amazing Spider-Man 2, Kraven the Hunter hunted and killed the Scorpion off-screen before turning it into a mounted trophy.

== Scramble ==
Scramble (Lionel Jeffries), also known as Scramble the Mixed-Up Man, is a character appearing in American comic books published by Marvel Comics. Specifically, he was an enemy of Alpha Flight, but for a brief time he was alternately their ally. Scramble is the brother of Madison Jeffries. Scramble first appeared in Alpha Flight #30 (February 1986) and was created by Bill Mantlo and Mike Mignola.

Lionel Jeffries and his older brother Madison Jeffries were mutants: Madison with the ability to alter metallic surfaces and Lionel able to manipulate organic matter. Lionel utilized his power to become a successful surgeon, and later both he and Madison were among the many thousands of Canadians to enlist in the United States Army during the Vietnam War. Madison, who loathed being a mutant, served as a mechanic, whereas Lionel craved the opportunity to use his powers for good as a medic. However, Lionel's inability to resurrect many of his fellow soldiers after an explosion dismembered their squad caused him to go insane, and Madison had to use his own powers to assist in restraining him.

In the years following the war, Madison had his brother committed to Montreal General Hospital, before joining Alpha Flight. Lionel later goes insane and becomes a villain. However, Madison manipulates him into using his powers to heal his mind.

Scramble eventually headed the New Life Clinic, an organization that medically assisted Alpha Flight on several occasions, becoming a strong ally of the team in the process. However, gradually, his madness began to return, and he began a secret campaign to create a race of genetic superhumans before Madison kills him.

== Scrambler ==
Scrambler (Kim Il Sung) is a mutant supervillain appearing in American comic books published by Marvel Comics, debuting in Uncanny X-Men #210 (October 1986) by Chris Claremont, John Romita Jr. and Dan Green. Scrambler is a member of the mercenary group, the Marauders.

Scrambler joined the Marauders during the events of "Mutant Massacre", "Inferno", and "Messiah Complex", the latter of which sees him lose his hands and retire from supervillainy.

Scrambler is a mutant with the ability to disrupt any system with his touch, including living systems, machines, and fields of energy.

== Grady Scraps ==
Grady Scraps is a character appearing in American comic books published by Marvel Comics. The character, created by writer Dan Slott and artist Humberto Ramos, first appeared in The Amazing Spider-Man #648 (January 2011). He is Peter Parker's comical co-worker at Max Modell's Horizon Labs. Scraps gets involved in various Spider-Man storylines, such as "Spider-Man: Big Time" and "Spider-Island".

=== Grady Scraps in other media ===
Grady Scraps appears in Spider-Man, voiced by Scott Menville. This version is a teenager and scientist working at Horizon High.

== Sea Leopard ==
Sea Leopard is a character appearing in American comic books published by Marvel Comics.

Sea Leopard is from an unspecified underwater race with longevity, telepathy, sharp leopard-like claws, and a leopard-like tail that can be used as a weapon. He later collaborated with Black Moray at the sight of Old Atlantis where Sea Leopard defeated Attuma and Andromeda. Namor defeated Sea Leopard and left Attuma to deal with him.

Sea Leopard later joined up with the Fathom Five.

== Sea Urchin ==
Sea Urchin (Jeremy Swimming-Bear) is a character appearing in American comic books published by Marvel Comics. He first appeared in The New Warriors #14 (August 1991) and was created by Fabian Nicieza and Mark Bagley.

He is a treasure hunter and salvager who wears a suit of armor that enhances his speed and strength and allows him to survive in the deep ocean. He most often appears as an enemy of Namor, threatening to plunder Atlantis.

== Seeker ==
Seeker is the name of several characters appearing in American comic books published by Marvel Comics.

=== Kadlec ===
When Maximus took the throne of Attilan, he appointed the Seeker Kadlec to find and retrieve the exiled Inhuman Royal Family, so that Maximus could marry Medusa and keep the others under observation.

It is later revealed that he was the one who killed Gorgon's father. Following a cave-in that buried him and Gorgon, Seeker was found dead.

=== Ralphie Hutchins ===
Ralphie Hutchins once used the Seeker alias.

=== Uys ===
Years later, Kadlec's twin brother Uys assumes the mantle of Seeker and battles the group Fantastic Force. The Seeker was part of a group of Inhumans, including Kaliban, Asmodeus, Avius, Falcona, Leonus, Pinyon, and Timberius, who attacked the Fantastic Four during a public appearance in the Bronx, New York. The Inhumans seek to recover Ahura, the son of Black Bolt and Medusa, for the Genetics Council. Ahura is convinced to return to Attilan, but the Chief Justice of the Genetics Council betray the rest of the Inhumans to usurp Ahura's power for himself. The "evil" Inhumans continue to defend the Genetics Council, but vanish after the Chief Justice is defeated.

=== Powers and abilities of Seeker ===
The Kadlec incarnation of Seeker is attuned to Terrigen Mist, enabling him to track other Inhumans for thousands of miles.

=== Seeker in other media ===
- The Kadlec incarnation of Seeker appears in the Fantastic Four episode "Inhumans Saga: Beware the Hidden Land", voiced by Kerrigan Mahan.
- An unidentified incarnation of Seeker appears in Avengers Assemble, voiced by Mark Hanson.

== Amanda Sefton ==
Amanda Sefton (Jimaine Szardos), also known as Daytripper and Magik, is a character appearing in American comic books published by Marvel Comics. Created by Chris Claremont and Dave Cockrum, the character first appeared in X-Men #98 (April 1976). She is the foster sister and former lover of Kurt Wagner / Nightcrawler of the X-Men.

Jimaine Szardos and her mother Margali are Manouche witches. When Nightcrawler joins the X-Men, Jimaine follows him to the United States, assumes the identity of Amanda Sefton, takes a job as a flight attendant, and eventually becomes Nightcrawler's girlfriend. When Margali attacks the X-Men, believing Nightcrawler to have been responsible for the death of her son Stefan, Amanda reveals herself as Jimaine, convinces her mother to let Kurt live, and resumes her on-and-off relationship with him. Their relationship breaks apart when Kurt suffers a severe case of self-doubt following an encounter with the Beyonder.

Amanda Sefton later assumes the identity of Magik. She thwarts Belasco and the N'Garai's takeover of Limbo and Earth and rallies the rulers of Hell to unite them in a common goal: the preservation of Hell. Amanda has also mastered the ability to magically control the stepping discs of Limbo, like Belasco before her, and practices to wield the Soulsword. Amanda is later driven out of Limbo by Belasco and loses the Soulsword.

During the storyline "X-Men: Second Coming", Nightcrawler is killed while protecting Hope Summers from Bastion. After being resurrected, Nightcrawler attempts to reunite with Amanda Sefton, but she is almost kidnapped by the villain Trimega. After subduing Trimega, Nightcrawler grants Amanda and Margali sanctuary in the Jean Grey School for Higher Learning. However, an army of Trimegas descend upon the school. During the battle, Nightcrawler learns that Margali is the creator of Trimega and orchestrated the attack to gain knowledge of how to cross into the afterlife. Armed with this knowledge, Margali opens a portal whose existence would endanger reality. Nightcrawler and Amanda attempt to pass the gate, but Nightcrawler's voluntary exile from Heaven bars him from entry, stranding Amanda alone in the void.

=== Amanda Sefton in other media ===
- Amanda Sefton appears in X-Men: Evolution, voiced by Moneca Stori. This version is an African/Romani American teenager and student of Bayville High School who lacks magical powers.
- Amanda Sefton appears in the X2: X-Men United prequel comic.

== Señor Muerte / Señor Suerte ==
Señor Muerte and Señor Suerte are aliases used by several characters appearing in American comic books published by Marvel Comics.

=== Ramon Garcia ===
Ramon Garcia, was born in Hatillo, Puerto Rico, the owner of a chain of gambling casinos and a criminal who called himself "Señor Suerte" as head of criminal gambling operations and "Señor Muerte" when he killed his opponents. Ramon sent men to kill Frank Jenks and Luke Cage. Muerte attempted to kill Luke Cage, and murdered a rival casino owner. He battled Cage, but was electrocuted by his own device during the battle and died. Ramon reappears without explanation years later, being forced to commit crimes by Lady Caterpillar, who had abducted his wife.

=== Jaime and Phillip ===
After Ramon's death, his younger brothers Jaime and Phillip took over his operations, and became the co-owners of their brother's gambling casinos. Jaime, a thief, became "Señor Suerte" and Phillip, an assassin, became "Señor Muerte".

=== Señor Muerte / Señor Suerte in other media ===
Señor Muerte appears in The Avengers: Earth's Mightiest Heroes episode "To Steal an Ant-Man".

== Sentinel Number Two ==
Sentinel Number Two is a character appearing in comic books published by Marvel Comics. The character, created by Roy Thomas and Neal Adams, first appeared in X-Men vol. 1 #58 (May 1969).

=== Cynthia Chalmers ===
Dr. Cynthia Chalmers was created by Roy Thomas, Dann Thomas and Rich Buckler, and first appeared in Marvel Super-Heroes vol. 2 #6 (July 1991).

She was an archaeologist who has terminal cancer, resulting in a search for Sentinel technology where she's betrayed by her work crew and saved by the X-Men. Cynthia's cerebral transfer resulted in the Sentinel programming reasserted itself and her human body's death, trapping her mind inside the Sentinel until managing to seize control and flew herself into the Sun to prevent the Sentinel programming from harming anyone else.

== Senyaka ==
Suvik Senyaka is a character appearing in American comic books published by Marvel Comics. He first appeared in Uncanny X-Men #300 (May 1993) and was created by Scott Lobdell and John Romita Jr. He is the first Sri Lankan character to appear in Marvel Comics.

Senyaka is a mutant recruited by Fabian Cortez as a member of a second group of the Acolytes. He is able to drain the bio-electrical essence of others upon physical contact, augmenting his strength, endurance, and reflexes, and giving him a healing factor. Senyaka can also utilize the excess life-force he drains to generate a pair of psionic whips composed of bio-electric energy. These whips move according to his mental command and can greatly increase the distance of his absorption ability. The whips can also conduct his bio-electric energy to ignite nerve clusters in an opponent to cause intense pain or paralysis, as well as sear into their flesh.

When Selene dispatches her Inner Circle to retrieve a mystical knife necessary to complete her ritual, Senyaka battles Wolverine, who decapitates him.

=== Senyaka in other media ===
- Senyaka appears in the X-Men: The Animated Series episode "Secrets, Not Long Buried" as a resident of the mutant community of Skull Mesa.
- Senyaka appears in Wolverine and the X-Men as a member of the Acolytes.

== Sepulchre ==
Sepulchre (also known as Shadowoman) is a character appearing in American comic books published by Marvel Comics. She first appeared in Quasar #45 (April 1993), and was created by Mark Gruenwald and Grant Miehm.

After a difficult childhood, Jillian Woods left home to attend the University of San Francisco. While there, she met occult lecturer Doctor Druid. They discovered that a psychic link existed between them. Druid probed Jillian's mind and learned her soul had inhabited a male alchemist in King Arthur's court in a past life, and that the alchemist loved a princess whose soul was reincarnated as Druid. The alchemist and princess were killed by the princess' brother because of their relationship, and the alchemist swore he would find the princess again. Jillian and Druid, surprised by these revelations, became lovers. Sometime later, Jillian accidentally released a demon, which killed her when she and Druid were investigating mystical artifacts Druid took from the sorcerer Magnus. Druid, using a mystical statue called the Bride of Slorioth, bonded a piece of Jillian's soul to her shadow, giving her shadow-manipulating abilities.

== Ora Serrata ==
Ora Serrata

Publication information
- Publisher: Marvel Comics
- First appearance: Legion of X #1 (Jun. 2022)
- Created by: Jonathan Hickman

In-story information
- Full name: Ora Serrata
- Species: Human mutant
- Team affiliations: Great Ring of Arakko; Inward Watch
- Notable aliases: The Witness; Arbitrix
- Abilities: Existence erasure

Ora Serrata is an Arakkii Omega-level mutant with the ability to erase things in her sight from existence. She claimed the Seat of Law on the Great Ring of Arakko from Uqesh after defeating him in combat following his ill-fated attempt to end Amenth's siege of Arakko with an army commanded by deities. As a response to Uqesh's plan, Ora implemented the Godlaw, which requires deities to prove their worth to the Arakkii people. In addition, Ora is the commander of the Inward Watch, Arakko's law enforcers.

After Arakko is relocated to Mars, Ora conspires with Mother Righteous and summons Tumult to terrorize Arakko and bolster the people's compliance. When Tumult escapes to Krakoa, Ora enlists Nightcrawler and Weaponless Zsen to track him down under the pretense of bringing him to justice. Her plot is uncovered and she is subdued by Nightcrawler, Zsen, Legion, and Tumult. Storm agrees to keep Ora's plot secret from the rest of the Great Ring in return for Tumult's erasure, Zsen's release from the Inward Watch, and the repeal of the Godlaw, allowing for religious freedom on Arakko. However, Tumult swaps bodies with Switch, who is killed in his place.

During the civil war on Arakko, Ora sides with Genesis. In the final battle of the war, Sunspot blinds Ora, allowing Xilo to possess her.

=== Powers and abilities of Ora Serrata ===
Ora Serrata is a mutant with the ability to erase anything in her sight from existence. Her body is connected to a large floating eyeball, which acts as the source of her powers. If the eye is damaged, Ora is unable to use her power until it regenerates.

== Set ==
Set is a character appearing in American comic books published by Marvel Comics. He is the chief deity, a serpent-god or "arch-demon", of the Stygian people in Robert E. Howard's stories of Conan the Barbarian in the Hyborian Age. He is apparently an amalgam of the name of the Egyptian god Set with the appearance/characteristics of both Apep and a monster from Greek mythology known as the Lernaean Hydra.

=== Set in other media ===
Set appears in Conan the Adventurer, voiced by Richard Newman. This version is a giant king cobra.

== Juston Seyfert ==
Juston Seyfert is a character appearing in American comic books published by Marvel Comics. He first appeared in Sentinel #1 (June 2003).

Juston Seyfert is an ordinary human teenager tormented by the seniors at Antigo High School in Wisconsin. He lives with his younger brother Chris and his father Peter (who operates a junkyard near their house). Their mother Jen left the family years prior. One day, he finds the remains of an MK VI Sentinel in the junkyard. Initially frightened by the discovery, he rebuilds the Sentinel, reprograms it to overcome its anti-mutant protocols, and forms a bond with it. However, Juston soon discovers the Sentinel's original purpose while searching online and coming across an article featuring the X-Men. Additionally, some bullies who had plagued Juston earlier strike back, hurting one of his friends. Hurt and humiliated, Juston returns to the Sentinel, contemplating using it for revenge.

Following Fear Itself, Juston and his Sentinel appear as students at the Avengers Academy. The Sentinel has gained the self-repair abilities of the later-generation Sentinels. Despite Juston hoping to be a hero along with his Sentinel, he is unable to fully eradicate its anti-mutant protocols. As a workaround, Juston creates higher-priority directives to override the Sentinel's protocols.

In Avengers Arena, Juston is among the young heroes who are abducted by Arcade and forced to fight for their lives in Murderworld. Juston is killed by Apex, who steals his Sentinel. The Sentinel is destroyed by Nico Minoru during her battle with Apex. In the series Sentinels, it is revealed that Juston's Sentinel infused him with nanotechnology before being destroyed, resurrecting him as a cyborg. Juston was found by Larry Trask and had his nanites harvested to create Sentinel cyborgs. Although placed in stasis, Juston begins communicating with the new human Sentinels, causing some of its members to be overtaken by the nanites and help Juston escape captivity.

== Shanzar ==
Shanzar is the Sorcerer Supreme of the Strange Matter Dimension. In need of a body outside of the Strange Matter Dimension, he possesses Hulk, transforming him into Dark Hulk. This led to him being exorcised after a fight with Doctor Strange and Namor.

== Shape ==
The Shape (Raleigh Lund) is a character appearing in American comic books published by Marvel Comics. The character was created by Mark Gruenwald and is loosely based on Plastic Man.

Raleigh Lund was born in Simak, Lowengard, in the United States of the alternate Earth of the Squadron Supreme. Although he appears to be an adult, his emotional and intellectual development is comparable to that of a child. Originally, he was a member of the criminal Institute of Evil, the Squadron's arch-foes, although, lacking sincere criminal intent, he mostly follows the lead of team leader Ape-X, his longtime friend. After the Institute of Evil lost a battle against the Squadron, all of the institute's members underwent behavior modification, their criminal records were pardoned, and they all joined the Squadron. Eventually the behavior modification was reversed by the Squadron's opponents the Redeemers, but Shape, having never been a criminal at heart in the first place, remained with the Squadron.

== Shaper of Worlds ==
The Shaper of Worlds is a character appearing in American comic books published by Marvel Comics. It was created by writer Archie Goodwin and artist Herb Trimpe, and first appeared in The Incredible Hulk #155 (September 1972). Its origin was revealed in Captain America Annual #7 (1983).

The Shaper of Worlds was originally created thousands of years ago by Skrull scientists in the form of a Cosmic Cube for use by the Skrull emperor to enforce his rule. The Cube developed sentience, and because its mind had been imprinted by the emperor's personality, it lashed out and devastated a significant portion of the Empire before reaching maturity. It was after this that it started calling itself the "Shaper of Worlds" and assumed the form of a white-skinned Skrull with a metallic lower body mounted on tractor treads.

In Secret Wars, the Silver Surfer meets with Glorian and the Shaper and learns that they intend to rebuild the multiverse following its destruction. However, Glorian manipulates the Surfer into helping him kill the Shaper to gain his power.

=== Powers and abilities of the Shaper of Worlds ===
The Shaper of Worlds is an alien matter-energy construct with potentially incalculable physical power. It can restructure finite pockets of reality and alter the molecular configuration of persons and objects. He is also capable of intergalactic and interdimensional teleportation, and empathic perception. The Shaper's intelligence is immeasurable, but lacking a creative imagination, it must use the minds of other sentient beings as a conduit.

== Shark-Girl ==
Shark-Girl (Iara Dos Santos) is a character appearing in American comic books published by Marvel Comics. The character was created by Jason Aaron and Nick Bradshaw, and first appeared in Wolverine and the X-Men #20 (January 2013).

Shark-Girl is a Brazilian mutant with the ability to turn into a humanoid shark, giving her superhuman strength, speed, heal, as well as the ability to live in water or land. She was later recruited to the Jean Grey School for Higher Learning by Warren Worthington III.

Shark-Girl later becomes a citizen of the mutant nation of Krakoa, joining Dazzler's band as the drummer and Magik's Dark Riders. Following the fall of Krakoa, she starts a band called She Attax with fellow mutant DJ.

=== Shark-Girl in other media ===
Shark-Girl makes a non-speaking appearance in the X-Men '97 episode "Danger.exe".

== Miriam Sharpe ==
Miriam Sharpe is a character appearing in American comic books published by Marvel Comics.

Sharpe is from Stamford, Connecticut, and had a young son named Damien who attended Stamford Elementary. Her son was at school the day that a fight between the New Warriors and several supervillains destroyed much of Stamford, including the elementary school. After her son's death, Sharpe became a powerful voice in the emerging Pro-Registration Movement, demanding the government pass the Superhuman Registration Act (SHRA).

During the 2011 "Fear Itself" storyline, she saves surviving New Warrior Robbie Baldwin (Speedball), who was involved in the Stamford Incident, from an angry mob. During this time, she forgave Speedball for what happened in Stamford. She tells the mob that she doesn't believe Baldwin killed her son, that the villain he irresponsibly attacked did. Miriam comes to understand the entire world is under attack by a mysterious force of destruction and that Baldwin's resources with the Avengers and Miriam's disaster recovery training can do good. They work together to assist small towns the Avengers have not yet reached.

=== Miriam Sharpe in other media ===
Miriam Sharpe appears in Captain America: Civil War, portrayed by Alfre Woodard. This version's son was killed during the Avengers' battle in Sokovia in Avengers: Age of Ultron. She blames the Avengers for this and confronts Tony Stark, prompting Stark to support the Sokovia Accords.

== Shathra ==
Shathra is a character appearing in American comic books published by Marvel Comics. She is an insectoid creature from the Astral Plane and the totem of the spider wasp, much as Spider-Man is rumored to be a totem of the spider. She is the co-creator of the Web of Life and Destiny which transformed into her current state after her contributions went unrecognized.

Shathra possesses superhuman physical abilities and the ability to shoot paralyzing stingers out of her wrists. Spider-Man temporarily gained this ability during "The Other" storyline.

== Shatterax ==
- First appearance: Iron Man #278 (March 1992)
- Created by: Len Kaminski, Paul Ryan
- Species: Kree
- Teams: Starforce
- Abilities: Strength, durability, energy projection
- Further reading: Shatterax at the Comic Book DB (archived from the original)

Shatterax (Roco-Bai) is a character appearing in American comic books published by Marvel Comics. He was created by Len Kaminski and Paul Ryan and made his first appearance in Iron Man #278 (March 1992).

Roco-Bai was a member of a new breed of Kree cyborg soldiers, dubbed techno-warriors, and he battled the superhero Iron Man during Kree-Shi'ar War. Later, he joined the Starforce.

During the Annihilation: Conquest storyline, he along with Kree were infected by the Phalanx, becoming one of their select and took part on the assault against Adam Warlock, which failed.

== Shatterfist ==
Shatterfist is a character appearing in American comic books published by Marvel Comics. Created by Tom DeFalco, Ron Frenz, and Al Milgrom, he first appeared in The Mighty Thor #440 (December 1991).

When Zarrko the Tomorrow Man hoped to absorb the power of the mystical hammers of Thor and Dargo Ktor, he was stopped by Beta Ray Bill. When the three heroes banded together to confront Zarrko, he summoned a number of enemies from the future. One of them was Shatterfist, who Thor has not encountered yet.

The second Crimson Cowl invites Shatterfist to join her incarnation of the Masters of Evil.

Shatterfist's signature weapons are the power gloves he wears. Of unknown origin, the gloves are capable of delivering devastating blows, sufficient to pound through steel several feet thick.

== Shinobi Shaw ==
Shinobi Shaw, also known as a Black King of the Hellfire Club, is a character appearing in American comic books published by Marvel Comics. The character is usually depicted as an adversary of the X-Men and their affiliated teams. Created by Chris Claremont, Jim Lee and Whilce Portacio, the character first appeared in X-Factor #67 (June 1991). He is the adoptive son of Sebastian Shaw and a mutant with the ability to control the density of his own body.

Shinobi is introduced as a member of the Upstarts, a group who were manipulated by the Gamesmaster and Selene to compete in a "game" which involved killing prominent mutants and garnering points from each kill. Shinobi picks his own father as a target and apparently kills him on the Upstarts' orders, resentful of Sebastian's treatment of him.

In the 2019 Krakoan Age relaunch, Shinobi is placed under the care of his father, who appoints him the Black Bishop of the Hellfire Trading Company. In addition, Shinobi is revealed to be Harry Leland's illegitimate son.

=== Shinobi Shaw in other media ===
Shinobi Shaw appears as a boss in X-Men: Gamesmaster's Legacy.

== She-Hulk ==
She-Hulk is the name of several characters in Marvel Comics.

== She-Venom ==
She-Venom is a name utilized by several characters appearing in American comic books published by Marvel Comics. Each character is a female host of the Venom symbiote.

=== Patricia Robertson ===
Patricia Robertson first appeared in Venom #1 (June 2003), and was created by Daniel Way and Francisco Herrera.

A lieutenant in the US Army stationed at the nearby Christmastown radar station, she arrived at the Ararat Corporation laboratory in the Canadian Arctic during the second Venom symbiote's rampage. She later bonds with the Venom and Scream symbiotes before sacrificing herself to save Andi Benton from Knull.

== Shift ==
Shift is one of three clones of Miles Morales created by the Assessor. He possesses shapeshifting abilities and the ability to generate organic webbing. Miles later gives Shift the name Jaime Morales after his late grandfather.

== Ship ==
The Ship is an alias for two characters appearing in American comic books published by Marvel Comics.

=== Rora ===
Rora, created by Chris Claremont and John Byrne, first appeared in Marvel Preview #11 (July 1977). She is Star-Lord's loyal companion and transport.

=== Celestial version ===
The Celestial version, created by Louise Simonson and Walter Simonson, first appeared in X-Factor #15 (January 1987) and as an artificial intelligence in X-Factor #19 (May 1987). The Ship is a self-aware program which has been utilized for Apocalypse's gigantic headquarters as well as X-Factor's base before being reconfigured into a different form.

=== Other versions of Ship ===
Rora of Earth-791 was originally a sentient star that had a race of beings wipe out her planets' inhabitants. Following her destruction, Rora was gathered by the Master of the Sun, who turned her into the Ship.

=== Ship in other media ===
- The Celestial version of the Ship appears in X-Men: The Animated Series, voiced by Catherine Disher.
  - The Ship appears in the second season of X-Men '97, voiced by Rachel Kimsey.
- Rora appears in Guardians of the Galaxy, voiced by Tara Strong. This version is an artificial intelligence utilized by J'son.

== Randall Shire ==
Randall Shire is a mutant character appearing in American comic books published by Marvel Comics. He was created by Robert Weinberg and Michael Ryan and first appeared in Cable #79 (March 2000). He is a "psycho-morph", able to vocally impose his emotions onto those nearby.

Randall Shire ran a small traveling carnival in Australia consisting of low-level mutants pretending to be sideshow entertainers, until he was possessed by Semijan, one of a group of alien energy beings called the Undying. During his possession, Semijan uses Shire's powers to become a renowned public speaker promoting "harmony", concealing his true goal of mass murder. After enthralling G.W. Bridge to gain access to high-level Pentagon officials at a speaking event, Shire is targeted for assassination by Domino, herself possessed by another Undying named Aentaros. Cable broadcasts Semijan's telepathic hatred for Aentaros to the military audience; this causes everyone in attendance to turn on Shire, publicly discrediting him.

In New Avengers, Shire appears in a database of mutants who were stripped of their powers after the events of M-Day, although he is not mentioned by name.

== S.H.O.C. ==
S.H.O.C. (Todd Fields) is a character appearing in American comic books published by Marvel Comics. He was created by Howard Mackie and John Romita Jr. and first appeared in Spider-Man #76 (January 1997).

Todd Fields is the son of Dr. William Fields who worked for Hydra on Project S.H.O.C. (Sub-dimensional Human-based Occultechnic Conduit). The idea behind it was to use a highly evolved technology connecting to the Darkforce. It was made into an armor by Doctor William Fields, and it has the capabilities of Cloak, as in shadow-melting and projecting the Darkforce energy into the armor to modify its form. Fields's first subject was a man that would come to be known as Loxias Crown, however, Crown had his own hidden agenda and killed Fields along with many other Hydra agents and was planning to use the S.H.O.C. technology to conquer the world. Todd was a young boy when he witnessed the death of his father, which traumatized him greatly. His father left Todd with key components for Todd to track and steal another S.H.O.C. armor and bond with it. Todd then became S.H.O.C. and swore revenge on Crown for murdering his father.

== Shocker ==
Shocker is the name of two characters in Marvel Comics.

== Shogo Lee ==
Shogo Lee is a character appearing in American comic books published by Marvel Comics. He was created by writer Brian Wood and artist Olivier Coipel and first appeared in X-Men (vol. 4) #1 (July 2013). He is a human and the adopted son of Jubilee.

While in Otherworld, a combination of fairy magic and Shogo's own imagination allows him to transform into a dragon. As a dragon, Shogo joined the Knights of X in their quest for the Siege Perilous.

== Shotgun ==
Shotgun (Jensen "J.R." Walker) is a character appearing in American comic books published by Marvel Comics. The character, created by Ann Nocenti and John Romita Jr., first appeared in Daredevil #271 (October 1989).

J.R. Walker was once a soldier in the United States Army before becoming an assassin working for the CIA. The CIA and Skip Ash sent Shotgun to retrieve a young blonde woman known as Number 9. He wound up battling Daredevil.

He has worked side by side with the Punisher at one point, teaming up to destroy the Carbone crime family. Shotgun had been hired to do this because the Carbone family were not the 'tame' Mafiosi that the government enjoyed. Shotgun saves the lives of the Punisher and ally Mickey Fondozzi. Shotgun and the Punisher then work to slaughter an isolated island full of international Mafia members. This particular battle results in the destruction of most of the Carbone family, with Rosalie Carbone being left in charge.

An athletic man with no superhuman powers, Shotgun is a highly experienced hand-to-hand combatant and an expert marksman with most known firearms. Shotgun wears Kevlar (body armor) for protection. He uses a high-powered recoilless rifle firing a variety of explosive, concussive, combustible and disintegrative ammunition, and also has a specially designed one-man tank. Shotgun's equipment was designed by Central Intelligence Agency weaponry research and design.

== Shriker ==
Shriker (Jack D'Auria) is a character appearing in American comic books published by Marvel Comics. He has extensive martial arts training and has mastered all disciplines.

Jack grew up as a friend of Danny Ketch. He also studied the martial arts under sensei Yugi Watanabe. One day a motorcycle gang entered the garage where Dan and Jack frequented. They were on the run from Mister Hyde and locked the two up. Dan turned into Ghost Rider and defeated the group as well as Hyde. Later, Jack and his sensei were targeted by Deathwatch. Jack was injured, and later abducted from the hospital. However, Ghost Rider was able to free him with the help of Yugi's son Brass (Sean Watanabe) and Wolverine. Sometime later, Ghost Rider found himself assisted by the mysterious Shriker. Jack eventually revealed that he was Shriker. However, Dan asked him to stay out of the Ghost Rider's conflicts, as things were getting too dangerous.

== Shrunken Bones ==
Shrunken Bones is a character appearing in American comic books published by Marvel Comics.

Jerry Morgan is a genius in the organic sciences and worked as a biologist and biochemist before becoming a professional criminal. Morgan experimented in cellular compression, and once succeeded in reducing his own size, using a gas similar to that used by Hank Pym to reduce his own size. However, a subsequent experiment reduced the size of Morgan's skeleton, leaving his skin hanging loosely from his bones. Morgan later joined the Headmen in their quest to use their intellectual talents to take control of the world. Jerold Morgan first appeared in World of Fantasy #11 (April 1958), and was created by Angelo Torres. This story was reprinted in Weird Wonder Tales #7 (December 1974).

== Sibercat ==
Sibercat (Illich Lavrov), formerly known as Siberian Tiger, is a character appearing in American comic books published by Marvel Comics.

Siberian Tiger (renamed Sibercat in Soviet Super Soldiers #1) was a member of Father Garnoff's mutant underground in Russia. They worked with the original X-Factor to attack the Doppelganger's lab.

Later on, they helped the original mutant Soviet Super-Soldiers escape government capture. A cyborg named Firefox killed most of Illich's teammates, leading him and Father Garnoff to join with their new allies in the Super-Soldiers, forming a group alternately called the Exiles or Siberforce.

Sometime after that, Sibercat was made a member of the Winter Guard when Siberforce and the People's Protectorate merged into a single group. The group battled the Mandarin when his 'Dragon of Heaven' entered Russian airspace.

Sibercat's powers were a therianthropy-like transformation into a feline/humanoid form. Sibercat's feline-like mutation gave him heightened strength, speed, agility, endurance, 'catlike' reflexes, enhanced senses, a healing factor, and claws.

== Siege ==
Siege (John Kelly) is a character appearing in American comic books published by Marvel Comics. The character first appeared in Marvel Comics Presents #62 (September 1990), created by Dwayne McDuffie, Gregory Wright, and Jackson Guice.

After reverse engineering and deconstructing the body of the original Deathlok Luther Manning, Simon Ryker's brother Harlan Ryker of the Roxxon subsidiary Cybertek Systems built a prototype of a new, vastly improved Deathlok cyborg. Colonel John Kelly, a disenfranchised veteran of the Vietnam War who had recently been fired from his job as a police officer, volunteered to become a scientific guinea pig, serving as the wetware basis for Ryker's project. The remains of John Kelly's original body have been incorporated into the framework of the Deathlok cyborg. However, in his first outing as the professional soldier Deathlok he rebelled against his computer's pre-programmed mission objectives and the onboard computer system electrocuted his brain as it determined Kelly to be 'malfunctioning.'

Sometime later, after Michael Collins had been operating as Deathlok for a number of months, the remains of John Kelly's brain were mutated into the creature Biohazard. A copy of his consciousness is preserved in Deathlok's computer and is transferred to a cyborg body dubbed Siege.

In "Civil War", Siege joins the Initiative and becomes the leader of the Florida team the Command before he is killed by zombies.

== Raymond Sikorski ==
Raymond Sikorski is a character appearing in American comic books published by Marvel Comics. The character, created by Roger Stern and Bob Budiansky, first appeared in The Avengers #235 (June 1983).

He is a government liaison and a colleague of Henry Peter Gyrich. Sikorski dealt with bureaucratic issues involving the Avengers, specifically Captain America and the Vision, with less obstruction.

=== Raymond Sikorski in other media ===
Raymond Sikorski appears in The Avengers: United They Stand, voiced by Ray Landry.

== Sikorsky ==
Sikorsky is a character appearing in American comic books published by Marvel Comics. Created by Chris Claremont and Dave Cockrum, Sikorsky first appeared in The Uncanny X-Men #156 (April 1982).

Sikorsky is an insect-like cyborg and a member of the Chr'yllite race, an alien race capable of scanning organic bodies. Sikorsky has been a longtime member of the Starjammers as a medic. His real name is unrevealed and was instead named by Corsair, due to his resemblance to helicopters made by Sikorsky Aircraft.

== Silver ==
Silver (Jhimon Tang) is a character appearing in American comic books published by Marvel Comics. She was created by James Hudnall and John Calimee and first appeared in Alpha Flight #76 (July 1989). She is a mutant with the ability to generate optic cold blasts, ice, and fly.

She and her twin brother Zhao (codenamed Auric) were trained by the Chinese Communist government in their powers, and were set to join their super team, China Force. After defections within the team, the pair fled to Hong Kong. They later moved to Canada and were offered citizenship if they joined Gamma Flight.

The team soon disbanded and the twins joined Beta Flight, but were soon kidnapped and experimented on until their deaths. Their bodies were set to be auctioned off by the Chess Set, but this was interrupted by the New Warriors and Spider-Man. The base was destroyed, and the twins' bodies fused with a scientist into an energy being before leaving for space.

== Silver Dagger ==
Silver Dagger (Isaiah Curwen) is a former criminal and Cardinal with the Catholic Church. Driven mad after reading the Darkhold, Curwen became a sorcerer and began hunting magical beings, believing them to be great sinners. He took his name from his weapon, a silver dagger immersed in holy water that is effective against demons.

Silver Dagger infiltrates the Sanctum Sanctorum and attempts to brainwash Clea, but is trapped in the dimension of Agamotto, which he conquers. Some time later, Silver Dagger surrenders his left eye to Agamotto, who gives it to Doctor Strange. Silver Dagger battles Werewolf by Night, during which his eye is inexplicably restored.

=== Powers and abilities of Silver Dagger ===
Silver Dagger possesses an extensive knowledge of Christian theology, having earned a D.d. and PhD. in theology from a Jesuit college. He has basic hand-to-hand combat skills, including aikido, judo, and boxing.

Silver Dagger's left eye was replaced by the Eye of Agamotto, which can project beams of mystical force. He carries specially-crafted silver daggers which have been dipped in holy water for enhanced effectiveness against supernatural creatures. Silver Dagger uses a variety of automatic weapons which have been modified to fire silver bullets.

== Silver Scorpion ==
Silver Scorpion (Elizabeth "Betty" Barstow) a character appearing in American comic books published by Marvel Comics. She first appeared in Daring Mystery Comics #7 (April 1941), published by Marvel Comics' predecessor Timely Comics, during the period fans and historians call the Golden Age of Comic Books, and was created by Harry Sahle. He signed her origin story with the pen name Jewell, which comics historian Michael J. Vassallo believes marks a collaboration with another, unknown artist. She is Marvel Comics' first superheroine, following the antihero character Black Widow, who reaped evildoers' souls for Satan.

Betty Barstow, a secretary for private detective Dan Harley, wore a superhero-style costume to a masquerade ball, and along the way used her jiujitsu skills and investigative acumen to solve a case her employer had turned down. Enjoying it, she continued to be a masked crime fighter. Silver Scorpion is an honorary member of the Invaders.

== Roxanne Simpson ==
Roxanne Simpson is a character appearing in American comic books published by Marvel Comics. The character first appeared in Marvel Spotlight #5 (May 1972), and was created by Gary Friedrich and Mike Ploog.

Roxanne's father, Crash Simpson, adopted Johnny Blaze following his father Barton's death. Roxanne and Johnny grew close and fell in love. When Johnny made the deal with Mephisto and became his Ghost Rider, Roxanne's pure soul and incantations protected Johnny from being completely taken by Mephisto. Since then, Roxanne became the thing standing in the way of Mephisto's goals. Roxanne would eventually get tricked into rescinding her protection over Johnny, but Mephisto would still be defeated. Following this, Roxanne felt that it was time to move on and figure out who she was.

When Danny Ketch became the new Ghost Rider, Roxanne settled with Johnny and together had two children, Craig and Emma. Their happiness would come to an abrupt end when Anton Hellgate would murder Roxanne. She was later brought back to life and transformed by Blackheart into Black Rose. Roxanne was ultimately freed by Noble Kale before disappearing again. At some point, Roxanne and her children died from an unknown cause and went to heaven.

=== Roxanne Simpson in other media ===
- Roxanne Simpson appears in the film Ghost Rider, portrayed by Eva Mendes as an adult and Raquel Alessi as a teenager. This version is a news reporter who reunites with Johnny after the latter was forced to leave her when they were teenagers.
- Roxanne Simpson appears in the video game Ghost Rider, voiced by Peggy O'Neal.

== Sise-Neg ==
Sise-Neg is a 31st-century sorcerer who attempts to become omnipotent by time traveling back through history and collecting magical energy. While in 18th century Paris impersonating the magician Cagliostro, he encountered Doctor Strange, who was at the time searching for perennial foe Baron Mordo.

Despite opposition from Strange, Sise-Neg travels back to a prehistoric time on Earth when the demon Shuma-Gorath rules and banishes the entity. Continuing to journey back in time, Sise-Neg reached the moment prior to the Big Bang that creates the universe and absorbs all the magic in the universe. Originally intending to recreate the universe in his image, Sise-Neg realizes that his quest to achieve godhood was pitiable, as reality is harmony and as it should be. He therefore decides to recreate the universe as it was.

== Sister Anne ==
Sister Anne is a character appearing in comic books published by Marvel Comics. The character was created by John Byrne, and first appeared in Alpha Flight vol. 1 #1 (May 1983). She is a headmistress whose strictness is behind Aurora's dissociative identity disorder.

=== Sister Anne in other media ===
Sister Anne appears in the X-Men '97 episode "Danger.exe", voiced by Adrienne Barbeau. This version is a member of the Purifiers.

== Sister Mary ==
Sister Mary is an alias utilized by two characters appearing in comic books published by Marvel Comics.

=== Ultimate Marvel character ===
An Ultimate Marvel version, created by Ron Zimmerman and Duncan Fegredo, first appeared in Ultimate Adventures #1 (September 2002). She is a stern nun and teacher of Hank Kipple / Woody.

=== Purifiers member ===
The mainstream version, created by Craig Kyle, Christopher Yost and Clayton Crain, first appeared in X-Force vol. 3 #3 (April 2008). She is a scarred member of the Purifiers.

== Sister Dagger ==
Sister Dagger (Zheng Esme), also known as Deadly Dagger, is a character appearing in American comic books published by Marvel Comics. Created by Gene Luen Yang, Dike Ruan, and Phillip Tan, she first appeared in Shang-Chi #1 (September 2020) and was introduced as the younger half-sister of Shang-Chi.

One of the many daughters of the sorcerer and crime lord Zheng Zu, Esme was raised in her father's Five Weapons Society as the Champion the House of the Deadly Dagger outside of Paris. Much like with her siblings and other Society members, Esme was raised in isolation, with her only knowledge of the outside world coming from YouTube.

When Esme's half-sister Sister Hammer names herself as the new Supreme Commander of the Five Weapons Society over its rightful successor, Shang-Chi, Sister Dagger and her half-brother Brother Sabre approach Shang-Chi to usurp Hammer. Shang-Chi reluctantly joins them to free his remaining family from his father's cult.

Sister Dagger helps Shang-Chi defend London from Sister Hammer and her Jiangshi army. After their victory, Shang-Chi is named the Supreme Commander of the Five Weapons Society and offers Sister Dagger a place at his side, who happily accepts.

=== Sister Dagger in other media ===
A character based on Sister Dagger, Xu Xialing, appears in Shang-Chi and the Legend of the Ten Rings, portrayed by Meng'er Zhang. This version is Shang-Chi's sister who resents him for leaving her with their father, Wenwu, but reconciles with him.

== Skinner ==
Skinner is a character appearing in American comic books published by Marvel Comics. The character was created by Howard Mackie and Adam Kubert.

Skinner first appeared in Ghost Rider/Blaze: Spirits of Vengeance #3 in 1992 and in other series such as Nightstalker and Morbius, the Living Vampire, as part of the "Siege of Darkness" storyline. He later appeared in the limited series Over the Edge.

Skinner initially had a violent life, but he tried to abandon this and settled down with a wife, who bore him children. However, his wife Pilgrim and the supervillain Blackout went to his home in an attempt to get him to return to his life of crime. Skinner then embarked on a quest to kill Ghost Rider and Blaze. He encountered them in a diner and threatened to kill the people inside until Blaze bargained with Skinner that if he fled, Skinner could chase him. Blaze could have fled but instead he waited for Skinner, and the two fought. Here Skinner told Blaze that he had kill his own family so he could be committed to his mother, and so that they could not work for her. Skinner did slay his family so they would escape the attentions of Lilith.

In battle, Blaze repeatedly shot Skinner, leaving him a living skeleton. After this Skinner sought out new humans to steal their flesh so that he may appear human again.

== Skornn ==
Skornn is an ancient evil demon known throughout the universe. On Earth, Skornn's plans are mostly thwarted by Cable. When Cable apparently destroyed Skornn, Skornn established a loyal group of ninja followers known as the Helix, who managed to recreate him. Deadpool, Wolverine, the Fantastic Four, and the Mutant Liberation Front work together to kill Skorrn.

== Skragg ==
Skragg is a character appearing in American comic books published by Marvel Comics. The character was created by Mike Friedrich and Jim Starlin, and first appeared in Captain Marvel #25 (March 1973). He is a Skrull, a member of the Children of Thanos, and the son of Raava. Skragg assisted the Super-Skrull against Captain Marvel, framing Rick Jones by impersonating the various enemies of Captain Marvel for confusion before Mar-Vell discovered the deception to which he is convinced to retreat. Skragg was killed by Thanos.

== Skunge ==
Skunge is a member of the space pirate Nebula's band of mercenaries. Skunge is a Laxidazian troll, the same species as Pip the Troll. Normal Laxidazians resemble humans; as a rebel, Skunge was transformed into a satyr-like form.

== Slab ==
Slab (Kris Anderson) is a character appearing in American comic books published by Marvel Comics. His first appearance was in X-Factor #74 (January 1992).

Slab is a mutant villain who was recruited by Mister Sinister to be part of the Nasty Boys and was the first team member to attack their nemesis, the government-sponsored X-Factor team. Slab climbed to the top of the Washington Monument and called Strong Guy out to fight him, and they battled. When Slab shrank to normal size to duck a punch, he caused Strong Guy to shatter and destroy the monument. Slab's battle was aided secretly by Senator Stephen Shaffran, who had the mutant power to manipulate probability.

Slab was captured along with his teammate Hairbag and taken to a holding cell by X-Factor. While he waited for his lawyer to negotiate bail, Slab and Hairbag were broken out of prison by the Mutant Liberation Front. Slab retained his mutant powers after M-Day and opened a lab for mutant growth hormone production with Hairbag and Gorgeous George. He went to Krakoa after the mutant nation's founding and later joined S.W.O.R.D.'s security division.

=== Slab in other media ===
Slab appears in X-Men: The Animated Series as a member of the Nasty Boys.

== Vic Slaughter ==
Victor "Vic" Slaughter is a character appearing in American comic books published by Marvel Comics. The character, created by Len Kaminski, first appeared in Morbius: The Living Vampire #6 (December 1992).

A government-trained mercenary, he is a nemesis of Morbius and Wolverine.

== Slayback ==
Slayback (Gregory Terraerton) is a character appearing in American comic books published by Marvel Comics. Primarily an enemy of Deadpool, the character exists within Marvel's main shared universe, known as the Marvel Universe. Created by writer Fabian Nicieza and artist Joe Madureira, the character first appeared in Deadpool: The Circle Chase #1 (August 1993).

Claiming to have come from a wealthy and loving home, Australian-born Gregory Terraerton was at some point turned into a cyborg dubbed "Slayback" by the Weapon X Program. Slayback afterward became a mercenary and worked alongside fellow Weapon X members Deadpool, Garrison Kane, and Sluggo, as well as the mutant shapeshifter Copycat. Over time, Deadpool grew disgusted by Slayback's sociopathy and sadism and attempted to kill him by detonating his body. However, Slayback's healing factor enables him to regenerate over the next decade, during which he swears revenge on Deadpool.

== Sligguth ==
Sligguth is a powerful demon with a reptilian appearance who was created by Set alongside his brother Damballah. They were created shortly after the Elder God Atum killed most of the other Elder Gods. In the present day, Sligguth comes into conflict with Doctor Strange, who manages to kill him in battle.

== Slither ==
Slither (Aaron Solomon) is a mutant who resembles a snake-headed reptilian humanoid. He is a master in hand-to-hand combat and possesses a flexible body that gives him the ability to constrict others. He was recruited, alongside Burner, Lifter, Peepers, and Shocker to serve in Magneto's new Brotherhood of Mutants.

Wanting to exploit a tiny spaceship he had found, Magneto sends the Brotherhood to apprehend Mister One, who controlled Mister Two. The villains attacked Mister One and Mister Two, and Captain America, in a park. When S.H.I.E.L.D. arrives, the Brotherhood flees back to headquarters, and Magneto captures Mister One. When Captain America and Mister Two attack, Slither constricts Mister Two until Mister Two throws Slither against Lifter. As he prepares to crush Captain America, Mister Two throws Slither around Lifter, incapacitating him.

Throughout his publication history, Slither has been a member of the Secret Empire and the Serpent Society. During the Secret Empire storyline, Slither rejoins the Serpent Society, renamed Serpent Solutions.

=== Slither in other media ===
Slither makes non-speaking appearances in X-Men: The Animated Series.

== Smart Alec ==
Smart Alec (Alexander "Alec" Thorne) is a character appearing in American comic books published by Marvel Comics . He first appeared in Alpha Flight #1 (August 1983) as a member of the eponymous team and was created by John Byrne. He was unidentified in his first appearance and was not named until Alpha Flight #8.

The character subsequently appears in Alpha Flight #7 (February 1984), #11–13 (June–August 1984), and Alpha Flight Special (1992) in a flashback story.

Alec Thorne was born in London, England. He was contacted by James Hudson to be one of the first members to join Department H. Alec was also one of the first recruits to join The Flight, a precursor to Alpha Flight. In their first mission, they stopped the terrorist known as Egghead from launching a thermonuclear missile at the United States. Later, after Hudson divided the team into three smaller groups, Thorne (as Smart Alec) began training in Gamma Flight.

Sometime after Gamma Flight was disbanded, its members were contacted by Jerry Jaxon to join Omega Flight in his bid for vengeance against Hudson. During the fight between Omega Flight and Alpha Flight, Smart Alec was defeated when he looked in Shaman's magical medicine bag; the resulting mental shock shut down his mind. Shaman shrank him down to miniature size and placed him in the bag until a way could be found to restore his mind.

Snowbird was later forced to kill Sasquatch to vanquish the Great Beast, Tanaraq, who co-inhabited his body. His mind was eventually transferred into Box's robot body. Langkowski's mind eventually entered Thorne's body in an attempt to return to the human world. Thorne's body was finally killed when Langkowski merged his mind into the Box robot to defeat Pestilence.

== Smoke ==
Smoke is a character appearing in American comic books published by Marvel Comics. His first appearance was in X-Force #119 (October 2001).

He was killed by Wolverine while attempting to kill Orphan.

Smoke had the ability to generate smoke clouds and various gases, including toxic ones. His body appeared to be composed of smoke, though it was solid enough to be sliced in half by Wolverine's claws.

== Snakes ==
Snakes is a character appearing in American comic books published by Marvel Comics. He first appeared in The Union #1 (February 2021).

Snakes is a member of the UK superhero team the Union, representing Northern Ireland. His body is composed of snakes.

== Martin Soap ==
Lieutenant Martin Soap is a character appearing in American comic books published by Marvel Comics. He was created by Garth Ennis and Steve Dillon, and first appeared in The Punisher (vol. 5) #2 (May 2000). He is usually depicted as an ally of the Punisher.

Moments after his birth, Soap was dropped on his head by a nurse. He was then abandoned at an orphanage in Dunmore, New Jersey, where he remained from 1971 to 1987. Soap was bullied by the staff and the other children, and during one unsuccessful attempt at running away he was inspired to become a police officer by the alcoholic detective who brought him back to the orphanage. Soap rose through the ranks of the NYPD to become a detective himself, despite all of his cases being botched by improbable events.

Soap is demoted back to detective and once again assigned to the Punisher Task Force after pictures of him soliciting a prostitute surface. The dismayed Soap attempts suicide, but is stopped by the Punisher, who convinces Soap to become his informant within the NYPD. After Soap kills serial killer John "Bubba" Prong in self-defense, Soap is promoted to Lieutenant.

Soap later leaves the NYPD, moves to Los Angeles and becomes a porn star.

=== Martin Soap in other media ===
- Martin Soap appears in Punisher: War Zone, portrayed by Dash Mihok.
- Martin Soap appears in The Punisher, voiced by Michael Gough.

== Sobunar of the Depths ==
Sobunar of the Depths is a character appearing in American comic books published by Marvel Comics. He was created by Gerry Duggan and Pepe Larraz, and first appeared in Planet-Size X-Men #1 (August 2021).

Sobunar is an Omega-level mutant from Arakko with an axolotl-like appearance and an aquatic ecosystem within his blood, which he can release if injured. He serves on the Great Ring of Arakko, holding the Seat of Below-Us - a seat consulted in issues relating to the ocean.

When Genesis returns to Arakko and incites a civil war, Sobunar sides with her, seemingly influenced by Annihilation. After Genesis' defeat, Sobunar resigns from the Great Ring, travels to Earth, and joins the Morlocks.

== Solarr ==
Solarr (Silas King) is a character appearing in American comic books published by Marvel Comics. Created by writer Steve Englehart and artist Sal Buscema, the character first appeared in Captain America #160 (April 1973). He belongs to the subspecies of humans called mutants, who are born with superhuman abilities.

King is a latent mutant and drug runner originally from Carson City, Nevada whose mutant gene activates when he spends several days out in the desert sun after his truck breaks down. While recovering from sunstroke and dehydration in a hospital, King realizes that he can absorb and discharge solar energy. He becomes a criminal known as Solarr and joins the Emissaries of Evil.

=== Solarr in other media ===
Solarr appears in the X-Men: The Animated Series episode "Secrets, Not Long Buried", voiced by Lorne Kennedy. This version is Bill Braddock, the leader of the Children of the Shadow and ruler of Skull Mesa.

== Solem ==
Solem is a character appearing in American comic books published by Marvel Comics. He is a mutant from Arakko with adamantium skin, created by Jonathan Hickman, Benjamin Percy, and Pepe Larraz and first appearing in Wolverine (vol. 7) #6 (December 2020).

As a child, Solem's village was raided and destroyed by the mutant pirate Sevyr Blackmore, who abducted Solem to sell him. Impressed by the child's constant escape attempts, Blackmore decided to train the young mutant. Solem eventually escaped successfully, cutting off Blackmore's nose and stealing his ship in the process.

Solem was imprisoned for 100 years for killing the mutant Bracken, the lover of War, in a duel. When he was chosen to fight for Arakko in the X of Swords tournament, it was War and her sister Pestilence who freed him, much to the former's fury. Solem traveled to Hell to obtain his sword, meeting Wolverine there. The two were forced to cooperate to receive their swords from the demon blacksmith Muramasa, ending with Wolverine owing Solem a favor for his assistance.

Solem's first challenge in the tournament was against his teammate War in a contest of who could cut off a limb from their opponent first. Solem called in his favor and asked Wolverine to take his place, telling War that Wolverine had killed her son Summoner in a previous challenge to enrage her before departing. After the battle at the end of the tournament, Solem escapes to Earth.

== Somnus ==
Somnus is the name of several characters in Marvel Comics.

=== Inhuman ===
Somnus is a member of the Inhumans.

=== Carl Valentino ===
Somnus (Carl Valentino) was created by Steve Orlando, Claudia Aguirre, and Luciano Vecchio, and made his first appearance in Marvel's Voices: Pride #1 (August 2021). He is a mutant with the ability of oneiromancy, and can manipulate or bestow dreams or nightmares on his targets.

A former lover of Akihiro, Somnus died of old age. When Akihiro learned of this, he had him resurrected as a young man on Krakoa. Somnus would go on to join the new Marauders team, and also assist X-Corps.

== Candy Southern ==
Candace "Candy" Southern is a character appearing in American comic books published by Marvel Comics. She was created by Roy Thomas and Werner Roth, and first appeared in The X-Men #31 (May 1967); the character's name is a combination of a novel and its author.

She is the former girlfriend of Warren Worthington III. Candy participated in many of the X-Men's adventures before being killed by Cameron Hodge.

== Southpaw ==
Southpaw (Sasha Martin) is a character appearing in American comic books published by Marvel Comics. The character first appeared in the comic She-Hulk. She is Holden Holliway's granddaughter and in the custody of She-Hulk and Awesome Andy.

Sasha wields a gauntlet of alien origin on her left hand that cannot be removed. She has a short temper and will often act without thinking (i.e., destroying her high school because they brought back school uniforms, or attacking the Champion because he took a piece of fruit from her).

== Spear ==
Spear (Jasper Daniels) is the brother of a convict named Jack Daniels and an unnamed brother who operated as Mangler. When Jack was dying of an inoperable brain tumor, he was a candidate for the "Power Man" experiments. When Jack couldn't survive the early "Power Man" experiments, Spear blamed Noah Burstein and began developing identities that would serve him in his quest to avenge his brother.

During the Shadowland storyline, Spear appeared as a member of Nightshade's Flashmob.

After his brother Mangler is attacked by a gang of "preemptive" vigilantes, Spear and the relatives of other ex-cons who had been assaulted resort to asking the Heroes for Hire for help. The vigilantes crash the meeting followed by the New York City Police Department. In the confusion that follows, Spear is arrested along with Iron Fist. Spear is remanded to Ryker's Island where he reunites with his brother Mangler. Together, the two form a group with Iron Fist and fellow inmates Gamecock and Little Ben.

=== Spear in other media ===
Spear makes a non-speaking appearance in The Avengers: Earth's Mightiest Heroes episode "To Steal an Ant-Man" as a member of William Cross's gang.

== Specter ==
Specter (Dallas Gibson) is a character appearing in American comic books published by Marvel Comics. He is a mutant with the ability to control his own shadow as a physical entity. The character first appeared in New Mutants (vol. 2) #3 (September 2004) and was created by Nunzio DeFilippis, Christina Weir, and Carlo Barberi.

Specter is initially a member of the Hellions Squad at the Xavier Institute, then the Paragons Squad before finally switching with DJ to the Corsairs Squad. He is depowered on M-Day and leaves the institute to live with his grandparents. He later joins the mutant nation of Krakoa, regaining his powers in the Crucible. He begins dating Graymalkin and joins Bishop's War College.

== Elias Spector ==
Elias Spector is a character appearing in American comic books published by Marvel Comics. He is the father of Moon Knight. The character first appeared in Marvel Spotlight #28 (January, 1976), created by Alan Zelenetz and Bo Hampton.

When he was a child, Elias Spector fled with his mother and Yitz Perlman from Nazi prosecution after Adolf Hitler invaded Czechoslovakia. Perlman was in reality a Nazi deserter who had adopted the identity of a long-lost rabbi friend of Elias' father in exchange for helping them flee to America. He had also killed Elias' father since he was the only person that knew of his true identity. Elias, his mother, and Perlman settled in Chicago, Illinois, and Elias was taught by Perlman to become a rabbi.

Elias later had two sons, Marc and Randall. He would walk his kids to school everyday, but him being a rabbi caused his youngest to be bullied, but Marc was there to defend his younger sibling. He was disappointed with his boys' violent nature and their obsession with war, he believed they should concentrate on their education but his wife dismissed this as "boys being boys".

As part of a supernatural method to extend his lifespan, Perlman became a serial killer of Jews. After Marc stumbled upon his secret by chance, Yitz left the city and was never seen again. Due to the traumatic experience, Marc developed dissociative identity disorder and never told anyone about Perlman's true nature. When Marc's multiple personalities started manifesting, Elias interned him at the Putnam Psychiatric Hospital. After his father's death, Marc was allowed to leave the hospital temporarily to attend the funeral and a late luncheon but, after hearing Khonshu's voice, he ran way. After his death, Marc resented his father, believing that Elias was embarrassed by him.

=== Elias Spector in other media ===
Elias Spector appears in the Moon Knight episode "Asylum", portrayed by Rey Lucas. This version became Marc Spector's caretaker after his brother Randall died in a cave flood and his mother Wendy became alcoholic and abusive out of grief.

== Mrs. Spector ==
Mrs. Spector is a character appearing in American comic books published by Marvel Comics. She is the mother of Moon Knight. The character first appeared in Moon Knight #37 (January 1984), created by Alan Zelenetz and Bo Hampton.

Mrs. Spector married Rabbi Elias Spector and had two sons, Marc and Randall. Her husband was disappointed with his sons' violent nature and their obsession with war, he believed that should concentrate on their education but she dismissed this as "boys being boys". When Marc's multiple personalities started manifesting, they interned him at the Putnam Psychiatric Hospital.

Following Elias' death, Marc was allowed to leave the hospital temporarily to sit shiva. At the reception, she attempted to comfort Marc against his belief that Elias despised him. Marc manifested his alter of Jake to cope and left to his old room where he heard Khonshu's voice, and it prompted him to run away.

=== Mrs. Spector in other media ===
Wendy Spector appears in the Moon Knight episode "Asylum", portrayed by Fernanda Andrade. This version was a good mother to Marc and Randall, until becoming alcoholic and abusive after the latter died in a cave flooding. After Wendy's death, Marc refuses to attend her funeral and only appeared outside the house while being glimpsed by his dad.

== Spider-Girl ==
Spider-Girl is the name of several characters appearing in American comic books published by Marvel Comics.

== Spider-Guin ==
Spider-Guin is a character appearing in American comic books published by Marvel Comics. She is an anthropomorphic penguin and an animal version of Spider-Gwen.

== Spider-King ==
Spider-King is the name of several characters appearing in American comic books published by Marvel Comics. The character, created by Dan Slott and Stefano Caselli, first appeared in The Amazing Spider-Man #666 (July 2011).

=== Steve Rogers ===
The first Spider-King was the mutated form of Steve Rogers during the "Spider-Island" storyline as a mind-controlled henchman of the Jackal and the Spider-Queen. The Spider King was the Spider-Flu's carrier for the Man-Spider virus before being cured.

=== Wannabe version ===
The second Spider-King was an unnamed man who was covered in spiders while claiming to be a mutate. One of the people to audition for the West Coast Avengers, he was rejected alongside many other wannabes.

=== Spider-King in other media ===
- An original incarnation of the Spider-King appears in the Spider-Woman episode "Return of the Spider-Queen", voiced by Lou Krugman. This version is a humanoid alien spider.
- An original incarnation of the Spider-King, Norman Osborn, appears in the Spider-Man multi-part episode "Spider-Island", voiced by Josh Keaton.

== Spider-Queen ==
Spider-Queen is the name of several characters appearing in American comic books published by Marvel Comics.

=== Shannon Kane ===
Shannon Kane used the web fluid that was developed by her husband who was killed by communists. Kane fought crime as Spider-Queen.

=== Ana Soria ===
Adriana "Ana" Soria, created by Paul Jenkins and Michael Ryan, first appeared in The Spectacular Spider-Man (vol. 2) #15 (August 2004).

The result of an American military experiment from World War II with the ability to control humans as minions with powerful pheromones, she seeks revenge for the US government's abandonment, resulting in confrontations with Spider-Man and the superhero community in stopping her biological bomb from destroying New York City.

Soria next appears as the supervillainess behind the "Spider-Island" storyline. She is the benefactor to Miles Warren / Jackal and has two Man-Spider enforcers, the Spider-King and the Tarantula. Kaine Parker later kills her, freeing New York from her ambitions.

=== Spider-Queen in other media ===
Ana Soria / Spider-Queen appears as a playable character in Spider-Man Unlimited.

== Spider-Woman ==
=== Charlotte Witter ===
- Further reading: Spider-Woman at the Comic Book DB (archived from the original)

Spider-Woman (Charlotte Witter) is a character appearing in American comic books published by Marvel Comics. Created by Howard Mackie and John Byrne, she first appeared in The Amazing Spider-Man (vol. 2) #5 (May 1999).

Charlotte Witter is a fashion designer and granddaughter of psychic Madame Web who also engages in black market transactions. Those dealings lead her to work for Doctor Octopus, who mutates her into a human/spider hybrid with the ability to absorb the powers of the previous Spider-Women in return for her agreeing to destroy Spider-Man. She manages to steal the powers of Jessica Drew, Julia Carpenter, Mattie Franklin, and Madame Web, but Franklin reabsorbs the powers and leaves Witter powerless. Witter is defeated and left in a coma in her grandmother's mansion.

==== Charlotte Witter in other media ====
Charlotte Witter appears as a playable character in Spider-Man Unlimited.

== Spidercide ==
Spidercide is one of several clones of Spider-Man introduced during the Clone Saga, in addition to Ben Reilly, Kaine, Jack and Guardian. He is a red herring who was introduced to make him seem to be the real Peter Parker who was locked in a pod for roughly five years. While still in denial of the fact that he was a clone, Spidercide dies during a battle with Spider-Man, Ben, and Kaine. Scrier recovers his remains and resurrects him, granting him the ability to turn into other materials and shapes in the process. Spidercide harbors intense hatred to both Peter Parker and Ben Reilly, jealous of Peter of having a life with Mary Jane Watson as his wife and sharing Kaine's belief that Ben is the original.

Spidercide ultimately betrays the Jackal, sending a copy of all of the Jackal's data to Scrier. After learning of this, Jackal attempts to kill Spidercide. Spidercide is once again incapacitated when he falls off the top of the Daily Bugle building, splattering his body into inert goo. His remains are taken away by police and he is placed in a state of suspended animation to keep him from returning.

Spidercide returns in the 2022 miniseries Ben Reilly: Spider-Man. Having escaped his stasis pod, he attacks Ben Reilly while posing as Scorpion, Lady Octopus, and Kraven the Hunter. However, Spidercide has a change of heart, giving up his life force to heal Ben after he is attacked by the inmates of Ravencroft. Ashley Kafka does not believe that Spidercide has died and begins working to resurrect him. Spidercide later appears in the 2024 miniseries Spine-Tingling Spider-Man, where he is used by the Jackal to battle Spider-Man. However, Spidercide helps Spider-Man by removing the power dampener and sensory implants that the Jackal implanted in him, enabling his mind to return to normal.

== Spike ==
Spike is the name of several characters appearing in American comic books published by Marvel Comics. They are not to be confused with Spyke from X-Men: Evolution, nor with Spike Freeman.

=== Darian Elliott ===
The Spike (Darren Elliot) debuted in X-Force #121 created by Peter Milligan and Mike Allred.

After watching video footage of independent hero, the Spike, in action, the Santa Monica, California-based mutant-superhero group X-Statix agrees to have him join the team. His antagonistic nature creates fighting and tension among himself and his teammates. During a battle with the mutant terrorist group the Brotherhood, Spike aids the Orphan in killing one of the Brotherhood members by impaling her as she fell backwards from the Orphan's punch. In another battle, in Central America, Spike and the Anarchist competed to kill as many militiamen as possible. Sometime later, after seeing Vivisector and Phat holding hands, Spike's homophobic reaction causes another rift with the team. Spike eventually is killed by an impostor, who is himself then killed.

=== Gary Walsh ===
Spike (Gary Walsh) is a character appearing in American comic books published by Marvel Comics. He first appeared in New X-Men #126 (July 2002), created by Grant Morrison and Frank Quitely. He was a student at the Xavier Institute before M-Day.

=== Spike in other media ===
Spike appears in X-Men: The Last Stand, portrayed by Lance Gibson. This version is a member of the Omegas who join forces with Magneto's Brotherhood to oppose the creation of a mutant cure, only to be killed by Wolverine.

== Spirit of '76 ==
Spirit of '76 (William Naslund) is a character appearing in American comic books published by Marvel Comics. He debuted as a member of the short-lived superhero team the Crusaders in The Invaders #14–15 (March–April 1977), created by Roy Thomas and Frank Robbins. In a canonical portion of a story in issue #4 (August 1977) of the alternative universe series What If?, Naslund succeeds Steve Rogers as Captain America, the first of three official replacements until Rogers resumed the role years later. This retcon became necessary after Marvel's conflicting accounts of Captain America in 1950s and 1960s comics had created a discrepancy.

William Naslund had no superhuman powers but was a brilliant athlete and a superb hand-to-hand combatant. As the Spirit of '76, he designed and wore a cloak made of an unknown bulletproof and fireproof material. As Captain America, he carried a steel shield, approximately 2.5 feet in diameter and fashioned by the U.S. government after the design used by the original Captain America.

Anubhav Chaudhry of Sportskeeda wrote, "His story is a poignant reminder of the sacrifices made by heroes during times of war." Nicholas Friedman of Comic Book Resources ranked William Naslund 18th in their "The Very Best Captain Americas" list.

=== Fictional character biography ===
William Naslund was born in Philadelphia, Pennsylvania. An athletic young man, hoping to help the Allies' World War II efforts in a unique way, he develops exceptional fighting skills and learns to copy some of the moves Captain America employed with the discus-like shield that he carried. He is recruited by a mysterious man called "Alfie" to become a costumed hero in the new team of adventurers called the Crusaders, alongside Dyna-Mite, Ghost Girl, Thunderfist, Captain Wings, and Tommy Lightning. The team eventually learns that Alfie is a German agent, but not before he has manipulated them into fighting the Allied super-team the Invaders. Upon learning how they had been duped, all the Crusaders but Naslund left costumed adventuring.

When the original Captain America, Steve Rogers, and his sidekick, Bucky, went missing in action in 1945, U.S. President Harry S. Truman recruited Naslund and a young man named Fred Davis to become the new Captain America and Bucky. Naslund was killed in 1946 in the line of duty when he was crushed to death by a robot while warning the rest of the All-Winners Squad of Adam II's attempt to kidnap or kill then-Congressional candidate John F. Kennedy in Boston. Naslund was succeeded as Captain America by Jeffrey Mace, formerly the superhero Patriot.

== Spirit of Vengeance ==
- Aliases: Wileaydus Autolycus
- Further reading: Spirit of Vengeance at the Comic Book DB (archived from the original); Spirit of Vengeance at the Grand Comics Database

The Spirit of Vengeance (Wileaydus Autolycus) is a character appearing in American comic books published by Marvel Comics. He is the Ghost Rider of an alternate future and a member of the Galactic Guardians. The character, created by Jim Valentino, first appeared in Guardians of the Galaxy #12 (May 1991) as the inheritor of the Ghost Rider mantle in the alternate timeline/reality Marvel Comics designated as Earth-691. The first appearance of the Spirit of Vengeance aspect of the character was in the following issue, Guardians of the Galaxy #13 (June 1991).

Wileaydus Autolycus is from the planet Sarka, Tilnast system, a priest of an offshoot of the Universal Church of Truth, and a religious zealot. He first encounters the Guardians of the Galaxy while they are responding to a distress call from Firelord in the Tilnast system. Mistaking the ship as one carrying Black Knights of Truth as reinforcements for the Universal Church of Truth, he undergoes his first transformation into the Spirit of Vengeance and blindly attacks the Guardians. Realizing his error, he sets out to "atone for this transgression" by charging into the heart of the fleet to buy the Guardians time to escape. Instead, the Guardians are captured and brought before the Grand Inquisitor of the Universal Church of Truth on Sarka. The Spirit of Vengeance, with help from Replica, enables the Guardians' escape. Before leaving, Vance Astro asks him to join them and consider changing his methods. He declines, saying he preferred to complete his work on Sarka, but that he would think on it as he kills the Grand Inquisitor.

Later, he is among those who respond to Martinex's call for help. He helps the gathered heroes save Martinex's homeworld and becomes one of the founding members of the Galactic Guardians.

== Sprite ==
Sprite is the name of several characters appearing in American comic books published by Marvel Comics.

=== Jia Jing ===
Sprite (Jia Jing) is a Chinese mutant who first appeared in Avengers vs. X-Men #12 (October, 2012). She joins Wolverine's Mutant Academy, vowing to become "the greatest X-Man who has ever lived" and to honor the pride her of family and country. Wolverine gives her the code name "Sprite" in honor of Kitty Pryde. She later joined the mutant nation of Krakoa. Sprite's mutation gives her a rocky body and insectoid wings, giving her enhanced strength and flight.

== Spyne ==
Spyne is a character in American comic books published by Marvel Comics. His first appearance was in Cable #17.

Spyne was one of the mutant members of the Dark Riders. A monstrous and cannibalistic carnivore, Spyne views his adversaries as a meal more than anything else. Spyne was first seen with the Dark Riders as they hunted down the team's former member Foxbat in Alexandria, Egypt. Later, Spyne was amongst those Dark Riders that hunted Caliban in the Morlock tunnels and clashed with Cable, Storm, and Domino. Spyne was able to disarm Cable, but Cable defeated him with his telekinetic powers.

After clashing with Cable and his allies once more in Egypt, where their leader was revealed to be Cable's son Tyler, calling himself Genesis, Spyne and the Dark Riders captured Faye Livingstone, a woman who once had a romantic history with Mister Sinister. The Dark Riders then captured Jean Grey for Genesis. After the events with Mister Sinister, Spyne took part in breaking Cyber out of a Scottish dungeon and took them to their rebuilt fortress in Egypt where the villain was stripped of his adamantium in a process that killed him. When the feral X-Man Wolverine infiltrated their fortress, the Dark Riders captured him and attempted to use Cyber's former adamantium skin to bond to Wolverine's bones, recently removed of their original adamantium by Magneto. When fellow X-Man Cannonball interfered with Genesis's plans for Wolverine, Spyne and the others started to beat up on Cannonball. This allowed Wolverine to break free from the bonding process, and both he and Cannonball fled to Apocalypse's resurrection chamber, where the Dark Riders pursued them. In the ensuing battle, Spyne is killed by Wolverine.

== Squid ==
Squid is the name of several characters appearing in American comic books published by Marvel Comics.

=== Scungili crime family member ===
The Squid was a gangster and the youngest member of the Scungili crime family who battled Spider-Woman.

=== School leader ===
The Squid is an Atlantean who is the leader of the School which fought Namorita.

=== Don Callahan ===
Squid (Don Callahan) first appeared in Peter Parker: Spider-Man (vol. 2) #16 and was created by Howard Mackie and John Romita Jr.

After his mother died, Don Callahann had a hard time relating to his father, "Big Mike" Callahan. He eventually fell into the wrong crowd and ended up transformed into a squid-like creature. In later appearances, he joins the Hood's crime syndicate, Swarm's Sinister Six, and Helmut Zemo's Army of Evil.

=== Unnamed criminal ===
Following Spider-Man's fight with Goblin King, it was revealed that Roderick Kingsley sold some of Squid's equipment to an unnamed criminal. This version of Squid later joins the Hateful Hexad. The fight is crashed by Itsy Bitsy, who kills Squid.

=== Squidd ===
The Squidd is an adversary of Namor.

== Squid-Boy ==
Squid-Boy (Samuel "Sammy" Paré) is a character appearing in American comic books published by Marvel Comics. Created by Chuck Austen and Ron Garney, the character is a mutant and a student at the Xavier Institute for Higher Learning.

Sammy Paré is a 10-year-old Canadian boy whose genetic mutation causes him to physically resemble a fish. The physical nature of his mutation causes his classmates to ridicule him. Sammy considers using a gun to shoot his tormentors, but before he can do so, he is visited by Professor X and Beast, who recruit him to enroll at the Xavier Institute. On the return trip to the institute, Professor X takes a detour to Ireland to aid in an X-Men mission at Cassidy Keep. Sammy saves Juggernaut (Cain Marko) from drowning in the ocean, which begins a friendship between the two. Cain reforms and becomes a surrogate father to Sammy.

Juggernaut later infiltrates the Brotherhood of Mutants as a double agent for the X-Men. When Sammy stumbles upon a meeting of the group outside the school grounds, he assumes that Juggernaut betrayed the X-Men and lashes out at him, but is killed by Black Tom Cassidy. During the Krakoan Age, he is resurrected on Krakoa.

=== Squid-Boy in other media ===
- Squid-Boy appears in Wolverine and the X-Men, voiced by Dominic Janes.
- Squid-Boy appears in the X-Men '97 episode "Remember It" as a resident of Genosha until he is killed by Sentinels.

== Helen Stacy ==
Helen Stacy is a character appearing in American comic books published by Marvel Comics. The character, created by Howard Mackie and Dan Fraga, made her sole appearance in Spider-Man #-1 (July 1997). She is the wife of George Stacy and mother of Gwen Stacy. She died when Gwen was young, leaving George to raise her alone.

=== Helen Stacy in other media ===
- Helen Stacy appears in The Amazing Spider-Man and The Amazing Spider-Man 2, portrayed by Kari Coleman. This version is happily married to George Stacy and, along with Gwen Stacy, has three sons: Philip, Howard, and Simon.
- Helen Stacy appears in Spidey and His Amazing Friends, voiced by Kari Wahlgren. This version is a detective for the NYPD.

== Stallior ==
Stallior is a centaur-like Inhuman who was a guardsman of the island of Attilan (originally in the Atlantic Ocean) with his brother Chiron. Along with the "Evil Inhumans" Aireo, Falcona, Leonus, Nebulo, and Timberius, Stallior became an insurrectionist and supported Maximus's military takeover of Attilan. Alongside the other "Evil Inhumans", Stallior was found guilty of treason by Black Bolt and banished to "the Un-Place." Alongside Maximus and the "Evil Inhumans", he battled the Hulk and the Inhuman royal family on multiple occasions.

== Loni Stane ==
Loni Stane, also known as Loni Stark, is a character appearing in Ultimate Iron Man. She was the first wife of Howard Stark, the mother of Obadiah Stane, and an enemy of Iron Man.

Loni was a greedy opportunist, looking for a man who could provide her with a life of wealth and privilege. With that goal, Loni married Howard Stark who was, in Loni's view, not a ruthless person with money. Loni divorced Stark and allied with Zebediah Stane to take over Howard's company while he was distracted with his second wife's pregnancy. After taking over Stark's company, Loni married Stane and later giving birth to their son Obadiah.

After Zebediah was imprisoned for kidnapping Tony Stark, Loni divorced him. She later organized his assassination to enrich herself and her son and framed Howard for the murder.

Loni was killed by Obadiah as revenge for leaving him for dead.

== Zebediah Stane ==
Zebediah Stane is a character appearing in American comic books published by Marvel Comics. He was the father of Obadiah Stane and a degenerate gambler. One day (some time after Obadiah's mother died of unspecified causes), Zebediah considered himself on a "lucky streak," played a game of Russian roulette, and shot himself in the head right in front of young Obadiah. This trauma caused Obadiah to go bald and shaped him for years to come.

=== Other versions of Zebediah Stane ===
The version of Zebediah Stane that appeared in Ultimate Iron Man was the business rival of Howard Stark and the father of Obadiah Stane. He was imprisoned for kidnapping a young Tony Stark and later assassinated by his ex-wife so Obadiah would receive his inheritance.

== Zeke Stane ==
Ezekiel "Zeke" Stane is the son of Obadiah Stane who manipulates other villains who have set out to destroy the Order. Stane targets the Order, Tony Stark's showcase Initiative team of California, while seeking revenge against Stark for the death of his father. Stane subsequently leaves California and prepares for the next stage in his vendetta against Stark.

Zeke Stane's genius-level intellect and considerable fortune allowed him to cannibalize and reverse-engineer Stark Tech from the black-market to upgrade his own body. Stane successfully reduced the caloric energy consumption of his body from 70% to 9%, leaving him surplus energy which he uses in repulsor bolts at the end of his fingers. Other upgrades have allowed his body to vastly repair itself from injury. This excessive use of the body's energy has shown that Stane must constantly keep his body's blood sugar level high to make up for its rapid consumption. Stane does this by eating a high (20,000) calorie paste.

=== Zeke Stane in other media ===
- Ezekiel Stane appears in the Marvel Future Avengers episode "Secret Past of Iron Man", voiced by Yōhei Azakami in the original Japanese version and by Benjamin Diskin in the English dub.
- Ezekiel Stane appears in Iron Man: Rise of Technovore, voiced by Miyu Irino in the Japanese version and by Eric Bauza in the English dub.
- Ezekiel Stane appears as a boss in Iron Man 3: The Official Game, voiced by Tom Wayland.
- Ezekiel Stane appears in Ironheart, portrayed by Alden Ehrenreich. This version is a tech ethicist.

== Fabian Stankowicz ==
Fabian Stankowicz is a character appearing in American comic books published by Marvel Comics. Created by writer Jim Shooter and artist Bob Hall, the character first appeared in Avengers #217 (March 1982). Stankowicz employs an exo-armor that grants superhuman strength and durability, as well as abilities such as extendable limbs, energy projection, gas emission, and limited flight. Initially portrayed as a supervillain and adversary of the Avengers, he later becomes an ally and serves as a support crew member for the team. He has been known as Mechano-Marauder and Mechanaut at various points in his history.

Fabian Stankowicz is a lottery winner who used his winnings to gain notoriety as a supervillain by using his engineering talent to invent powered armor suits. Under the alias of the Mecho-Marauder, Stankowicz arrives at the Avengers Mansion and challenges the Avengers. Unfortunately for him, the Avengers consider him a nuisance rather than a major threat.

Stankowicz later joins the Avengers' support crew. However, he is laid off when the Avengers are apparently killed fighting Onslaught. After salvaging Sentinel technology left behind from Onslaught's attack, Stankowicz designs a cybernetic helmet to control the Sentinels and have them form the Protectorate, a replacement for the Avengers. Edwin Jarvis informs Stankowicz that the Avengers survived, then has him destroy the technology that he had used to control the Sentinels.

== Zelma Stanton ==
Zelma Stanton is a character appearing in American comic books published by Marvel Comics. The character, created by Jason Aaron and Chris Bachalo, first appeared in Doctor Strange (vol. 4) #1 (October 2015).

Zelma Stanton was a librarian who got infected with Brain Maggots. A friend of hers directed her to Doctor Strange to see if he can help. Doctor Strange and Wong were able to help Zelma with the Brain Maggots. Afterwards, Zelma remained an ally of Doctor Strange.

=== Zelma Stanton in other media ===
Zelma Stanton appears in Ironheart (2025), portrayed by Regan Aliyah. This version is the daughter of former Kamar-Taj student Madeline Stanton and an assistant at her magic shop.

== Star ==
Star is the name of several characters appearing in American comic books published by Marvel Comics.

=== Chaste member ===
Star, a member of the Chaste created by D. G. Chichester and Ron Garney, first appeared in Daredevil #296 (September 1991).

Star had previously trained Elektra albeit in very harsh conditions and under the supervision of Stick. He makes his first proper appearance alongside Wing and Flame in aiding Daredevil take on The Jonin, Izanami and Spear. As his name implies, he is well-equipped with throwing stars. Later, he is seen with his comrades attacking Elektra as they felt that she did not belong in the Chaste, but she simply insults them for being scared of her and Matt's induction.

=== Jeanette Rhodes ===
Jeanette Rhodes was created by Christopher Priest and Joe Bennett, first appeared in Crew #1 (May 2003).

She is the younger sister of James Rhodes and the mother of Lila Rhodes. Estranged from her family, she was a crack addict and sex worker before she was killed by gang members.

=== Star in other media ===
The Chaste incarnation of Star appears in Daredevil, portrayed by Laurence Mason. This version was a member of the Chaste who worked alongside Stick before being killed by him.

== Xanto Starblood ==
Xanto Starblood is a character appearing in American comic books published by Marvel Comics. Created by Jason Aaron and Nick Bradshaw, he first appeared in Wolverine and the X-Men #5 (February 2012).

Xanto Starblood is an alien zoologist who believes in a natural order of the universe. Upon learning of Broo, a mutant Brood who possesses sentience and empathy, Starblood attempts to kill him. He attacks the X-Mansion, where he infects Kitty Pryde with a gestating Brood as a distraction. After being attacked and nearly killed by Broo, Starblood is captured by S.W.O.R.D.

Starblood is enlisted by Beast to cure Broo, who had degenerated into a mindless state typical of his species. As Broo goes on a rampage, Starblood is rescued and recruited to teach at Jean Grey's school.

After Spider-Man is transported to another planet by Hellgate, he was saved from its hazardous conditions by Xanto Starblood. When Spider-Man frees some of his specimens, Starblood agrees to help him get stronger by his next encounter with Hellgate and get him back to Earth.

== Starbolt ==
- First appearance: Uncanny X-Men #107 (October 1977)
- Created by: Chris Claremont and Dave Cockrum
- Species: Unidentified extraterrestrial race
- Teams: Imperial Guard
- Abilities: Flight, energy projection

Starbolt is a character appearing in American comic books published by Marvel Comics. Created by Chris Claremont and Dave Cockrum, the character first appeared in X-Men #107 (October 1977). He is a warrior serving in the Shi'ar Imperial Guard, a multi-ethnic group of super-powered alien beings who act as enforcers of the laws of the Shi'ar Empire. Like many original members of the Imperial Guard, Starbolt is the analog of a character from DC Comics' Legion of Super-Heroes, sharing traits with Sun Boy and Wildfire. Starbolt can fly and project energy bolts from his hands.

He was one of the views selected to explore "the Fault," but was killed by mutated creatures from the Cancerverse during "Realm of Kings."

=== Starbolt in other media ===
- Starbolt makes non-speaking appearances in X-Men: The Animated Series.
- Starbolt appears as a mini-boss in Marvel: Ultimate Alliance, voiced by Beau Weaver.

== Stardust ==
=== Lambda-Zero ===
Stardust (Lambda-Zero) is a former Herald of Galactus. Debuting in Stormbreaker: The Saga of Beta Ray Bill #1 (March 2005), the character was created by Michael Avon Oeming, Daniel Berman, and Andrea Di Vito. Stardust belongs to a race of energy beings known as Ethereals. As a Herald, Stardust holds the Power Cosmic, granting them an array of powers.

=== T'urin G'ar ===
Stardust (T'urin G'ar) is an energy being debuting in Rom Annual #1 (1982).

=== Stardust in other media ===
- Stardust / Lambda-Zero appears in The Super Hero Squad Show, voiced by Cheryl Hines.
- Stardust / Lambda-Zero makes a non-speaking appearance in The Avengers: Earth's Mightiest Heroes episode "Avengers Assemble". This version is a water elemental.

== Stark family ==
=== Ginny Stark ===
Virginia "Ginny" Stark (also known as Black Widow and Madame Masque) is the alternate future granddaughter of Tony Stark and Pepper Potts and daughter of Howard Stark III. She is the leader of a resistance against the Mandarin's future empire.

=== Morgan Stark ===
==== Morgan Stark in other media ====
In the main continuity of the Marvel Cinematic Universe, Morgan Stark is the daughter of Tony Stark and Pepper Potts. She was portrayed by Lexi Rabe in Avengers: Endgame and a delayed scene in Spider-Man: No Way Home. Katherine Langford was initially intended to portray a future version of the character in Endgame before her scenes were deleted.

=== Natasha Stark ===
Natasha Stark, also known as Iron Woman, is a character appearing in American comic books published by Marvel Comics. The character first appeared in Fantastic Four: Dark Reign #2 (April 2009), and was created by Jonathan Hickman and Sean Chen. She is an alternate version Tony Stark / Iron Man who was never turned back into a man following a version of the events of the 2007 The Mighty Avengers storyline in which Ultron turned Tony into a woman.

On this world, Earth-3490, Iron Woman averts the Civil War between superheroes due to the fact that she and Captain America had become romantically involved, and subsequently married, with the renamed Natasha becoming Natasha Rogers.

== Starling ==
Starling (Tiana Toomes) is a character appearing in American comic books published by Marvel Comics.

Tiana Toomes is the girlfriend of Miles Morales, the daughter of Lenora and Frankie Toomes, and the granddaughter of Adrian Toomes. Following Lenora's death, Adrian offered to take legal guardianship of Tiana and he later created a suit for her similar to his Vulture suit so that she can use it when following her dreams. This led to her taking the name of Starling, though Tiana was unaware of her grandfather's criminal activities at the time.

In the alternate future of Spider-Man: Reign 2, Tiana Toomes becomes the second wife of Miles Morales, and the mother of his unnamed son and his unnamed youngest daughter, after Miles believed both his first wife, Gwen Stacy and his oldest daughter, Kitty-Kat, were killed (not realising that both of them are in fact still alive and well, with the latter being raised by Felicia Hardy).

== Trish Starr ==
Patricia "Trish" Starr is a character appearing in American comic books published by Marvel Comics. The character, created by Mike Friedrich and Herb Trimpe, first appeared in Marvel Feature #5 (June 1972).

Trish Starr is Egghead's niece. Trish is occasionally used as collateral damage during Egghead's schemes towards Hank Pym, including one where she loses her left arm and another involving a bionic replacement.

== Steeplejack ==
Steeplejack is a villanous identity used by three different individuals in the Marvel Comics. The first and second Steeplejack were created by Len Wein and George Tuska, and the third Steeplejack by Dan Slott, Christos Gage and Humberto Ramos.

=== Jake Mallard ===
Jake Mallard, along with his two brothers, had a job as a New York construction worker under contractor Maxwell Plumm. Plumm's business practices included secret shortcuttings on quality control and safety, which eventually led to Jake's brothers falling to their deaths on the job. Jake tried to avenge his brothers by assuming the costumed identity of Steeplejack and trying to murder Plumm, but clashed with Power Man and fell to his death.

=== Maxwell Plumm ===
Inspired by Mallard's example, Plumm salvaged Steeplejack's gear, originally in order to patent it. Relocating to Boston to begin a new construction project, his continued budget-cutting nearly cost the life of worker Joseph Danvers, which brought his daughter Carol on Plumm's trail. Carol, as Ms. Marvel, confronted and identified Plumm, and eventually captured him for the authorities. After getting out of jail, Plumm decided to attend a meeting held by Gary Gilbert to counter the deadly threat to supervillains posed by the Scourge of the Underworld, only to end up as one of Scourge's victims himself after the vigilante infiltrated the gathering and shot everyone present with explosive bullets.

=== Hobgoblin's Steeplejack ===
An unknown criminal acquired Steeplejack's identity from Roderick Kingsley, with two others joining him as Ringer and Tumbler. They were ambushed by the Goblin King's servants Menace and Monster, who critically injured Steeplejack; he was subsequently killed by Kingsley.

=== Powers and Equipment ===
Jake Mallard used construction equipment repurposed as weaponry; his signature weapon was a rivet gun which could shoot both red-hot rivets and streams of flame. Plumm later reconfigured the gun to fire various energy beams as well, and added an armor-padded full-body costume. Hobgoblin's Steeplejack made use of a laser pistol.

== Stencil ==
Stencil (Maria) is a member of the Soviet Super Soldiers.

== Steppin' Razor ==
Steppin' Razor (Xedric Demacherlier) is a character appearing in American comic books published by Marvel Comics. The character, created by Ian Edginton and Douglas H. Wheatley, first appeared in Blade: The Vampire Hunter #4 (October 1994). He is usually depicted as an enemy of Blade.

Steppin' Razor, a vampire and an ex-crime lord of Jamaican descent, meets and recruits fellow vampire Carl Blake (also known as Night Terror) for a cause, the return of the vampire lord Varnae to the land of the living. Together with voodoo priestess Marie LaVeau, they lure Blade and then mentor "Bible John" Carik to Los Angeles. Their plan is to capture Blade and use his body as the vessel for Varnae's spirit. The attempt fails and in the resulting fight, Night Terror's body becomes the vessel for Varnae instead. All three villains manage to escape in the chaos.

=== Steppin' Razor in other media ===
Steppin' Razor appears in Blade: The Series, portrayed by Bokeem Woodbine. This version is the vampire leader of the Bad Bloods, a Detroit street gang that Blade was previously a member of.

== Ella Sterling ==
Dr. Ella Sterling is a character appearing in American comic books published by Marvel Comics. The character, created by Greg Pak and Cory Smith, first appeared in Weapon H #1 (March 2018).

Dr. Sterling is an archaeologist who works for Roxxon Energy Corporation.

== Shannon Stillwell ==
Shannon Stillwell is a character appearing in American comic books published by Marvel Comics. She was created by Dan Slott and Adam Kubert and first appeared in The Amazing Spider-Man: Renew Your Vows #3 (October 2015), which takes place in an alternate reality. Her mainstream continuity counterpart first appeared in The Amazing Spider-Man (vol. 4) #1 (December 2015).

=== Renew Your Vows ===
During the "Secret Wars" storyline, this version of Shannon Stillwell works for Empire Unlimited as its head researcher and wore a special suit that enabled her to copy the abilities of Demolition Man.

=== Mainstream continuity ===
Shannon Stillwell works as a scientist for Empire Unlimited under Regent. Unlike her alternate reality counterpart, she does not wear a power-copying suit. Stillwell is later revealed to be related to Farley Stillwell and Harlan Stillwell and is the daughter of Melodia Stillwell, also known as Madame Monstrosity.

=== Shannon Stillwell in other media ===
Shannon Stillwell appears in the Spider-Man episode "The Cellar", voiced by Kathreen Khavari. This version is the personal assistant of Regent.

== Stilt-Man ==
Stilt-Man is the name of several characters in American comic books published by Marvel Comics. Stilt-Man first appeared in Daredevil #8 (June 1965). He is a criminal wearing an impenetrable suit of armor with powerful telescopic legs. In addition to being one of Daredevil's most enduring arch-foes, he has appeared as an adversary to various other heroes, such as Iron Man, Thor, and Spider-Man.

=== Wilbur Day ===
Wilbur Day was born in New York City. As a scientist, inventor, and engineer, he was employed by Carl Kaxton who invented a hydraulic ram device. Wilbur stole Kaxton's designs and used them to engineer telescopic metal legs which allowed him to tower high over the ground. He incorporated these hydraulic stilts into an armored battlesuit, which he created for use in robberies as the professional criminal Stilt-Man. He battled Daredevil, and was seemingly shrunk into nothingness by an experimental molecular condenser ray. He later escapes the Microverse and works with the Masked Marauder.

During Civil War, Stilt-Man is killed by the Punisher. He was resurrected during the Dead No More: The Clone Conspiracy storyline.

=== Unnamed ===
During Day's absence from the world of costumed crime, an as-yet-unnamed criminal acquired the Stilt-Man armor. After upgrading its telescoping abilities, this Stilt-Man was defeated by Daredevil and Luke Cage. The fight only lasted as long as it did because Daredevil was afraid of knocking the villain out at his current height as the fall would have killed him. He was next seen being defeated by Ms. Marvel. Stilt-Man later fought both Daredevil and the Superior Spider-Man (Doctor Octopus' mind in Spider-Man's body).

=== Michael Watts ===
Michael Watts was chosen by a gang of small-time petty thugs to be the third Stilt-Man. He claimed to know a guy who knows a guy who knows a guy that leads to the connection of the Tinkerer who apparently upgraded the suit before his last arrest. Punisher was aware of the gang's actions. After some convincing by the Rhino, Frank let Watts live. Watts believes he and his gang will rise to great things since the Hood is coming to power over the supervillains.

=== Stilt-Man in other media ===
- The Wilbur Day incarnation of Stilt-Man appears in the Iron Man episode "The Armor Wars", voiced by Dorian Harewood. This version's armor is based on stolen designs for Iron Man's.
- Stilt-Man appears as an assist character in the PSP version of Spider-Man: Web of Shadows.
- Wilbur Day appears in the Nintendo DS version of Iron Man 2.
- Stilt-Man will appear in the tie-in comic Your Friendly Neighborhood Spider-Man Season 2.

== Stinker ==
Stinker is a character appearing in American comic books published by Marvel Comics. He first appears in The Incredible Hulk #271 (February 1982). He is an anthropomorphic skunk who is a friend of Rocket Raccoon and Lylla.

== Stone ==
Stone is the name of several characters appearing in American comic books published by Marvel Comics.

=== Pupil of Stick ===
Stone is Stick's second-in-command and former lover. She can withstand any physical attack as long as she is aware of it in advance.

=== Hounds member ===
Stone is a mutant and member of the Hounds who can transform his body into a dense stone-like material. He was involved in Project Wideawake and served as Sabretooth's handler.

=== Assassin's Guild member ===
Stone is a mutant with impenetrable rock-like skin and member of the Assassin's Guild. He fought Gambit before being cut to pieces and killed by Wolverine.

=== Stone in other media ===
- A variation of Stone appears in Elektra, portrayed by Bob Sapp. This version is a member of the Hand and possesses super-strength. He accompanies Kirigi in his mission to target Abby Miller. Elektra kills Stone by tricking him into walking under a tree that he previously attacked, as Elektra used her weight to bring it down on him.
- Stone appears in the Daredevil episode "Stick", portrayed by Jasson Finney and voiced by an uncredited David Sobolov.

== Stone family ==
=== Kron Stone ===
Kron Stone is the name of two characters in the Marvel 2099 reality. He is the older half-brother of Miguel O'Hara / Spider-Man and eldest son of Tyler Stone.

As a child, Kron was continually abused by the android housekeeper, which mistook him for a dog. As a result, he later became a bully, taking enjoyment in other people's pain. The relationship between the two brothers is so conflicted that Miguel tried to kill Kron at one point. In his introduction, Stone ordered Jake Gallows' family to be killed. Gallows found Stone and fatally wounded him with a knife as revenge, before dumping his body into the sewer. As Kron laid dying in the sewer, his body brushed up against a black ball. The ball then bonded to him and formed a new Venom. The symbiote was described as having mutated over the years, and displayed new abilities in this timeline, including acidic blood and saliva. With this new power, Stone sought to emotionally torture Miguel—whom Kron never discovered was his half-brother—by hurting those close to him, going so far as to kill Miguel's former love Dana—who was also Tyler's lover. After a fight between Spider-Man and Venom, the former emerged as the victor, using loudspeakers to neutralize Venom, who was taken to the lab for study. It was revealed that the symbiote bonded with Kron on a molecular level, giving Kron an amorphous physiology that allowed his body to take on the properties of the symbiote itself.

==== Timestorm 2009–2099 version ====
A variation of Stone appears in the Timestorm 2009–2099 as the alternate Marvel 2099 reality version of Scorpion. Stone was one of Miguel's nightmares during high school, a bully used to do whatever he wanted thanks to the influence of his father ready to solve any trouble the son caused. One evening, Kron was tormenting the lab animals in an Alchemax laboratory, using the powerful instruments found there. While toying with a gene splicer, Stone was attacked by a sudden surge of energy, transforming him into a monstrous scorpion hybrid. Rejected by his father, he becomes obsessed with finding a way to reverse his mutation.

=== Kron Stone in other media ===
Kron Stone as Scorpion appears as a boss in Spider-Man: Shattered Dimensions, voiced by John Kassir.

=== Tyler Stone ===
Tyler Stone is a character appearing in American comic books published by Marvel Comics. He is an enemy of Spider-Man 2099.

He runs the Alchemax Corporation, one of the largest corporate powers in the dystopian 2099 future of Earth. When his promising young employee Miguel O'Hara develops a troubling conscience over testing on humans, Stone has Miguel secretly addicted to the highly potent drug 'Rapture' that he controls to force his compliance. Miguel's successful efforts to rid himself of the addiction create several spider-based powers. Stone hires the corporate mercenary Venture to capture O'Hara, now known by the name Spider-Man. At the same time, Stone is making a deal concerning Latveria's current ruler Tiger Wylde. The deposing of said ruler also affects the first few issues of the series "Doom 2099". Venture does not succeed in his assignment.

=== Ty Stone ===
Tiberius "Ty" Stone is a character appearing in American comic books published by Marvel Comics. He is Tyler Stone's grandfather. An acquaintance of Peter Parker, he was the Kingpin's agent and the Tinkerer's protégé, while his acts of sabotage led to Horizon Labs' destruction and to Alchemax's rise with Normie Osborn's Oscorp stock.

==== Ty Stone in other media ====
Ty Stone appears in the Spider-Man episode "Cloak and Dagger", voiced by Jonathan Brooks. This version is the CEO of Alchemax.

== Stoneface ==
Stoneface is a feared crime boss and enemy of the Falcon. During his time as the crime lord of Harlem, Stoneface was brought down by Falcon, Captain America, and Spider-Man. Stoneface's territory in Harlem was then ceded to his former colleague Morgan. As a courtesy, Morgan helped exile Stoneface into friendly confines out of the United States in Lagos. When Stoneface kidnapped a visiting Leila Taylor, he came into conflict with Falcon again, who was assisted this time by Black Panther.

== Rex Strickland ==
Rex Strickland is a character appearing in American comic books published by Marvel Comics. The character, created by Donny Cates and Ryan Stegman, first appeared in Venom (vol. 4) #1 (July 2018).

Rex Strickland was a soldier in the Vietnam War who served as part of a black-ops super-soldier initiative as the host of the Tyrannosaurus symbiote. Tyrannosaurus initially seized control of Strickland which it tried to corrupt before gradually being touched by Rex's compassion, nobility and goodness, and tried to shield Rex from an explosion yet failed. Tyrannosaurus felt guilty and emulated its host's appearance/identity and personality for decades before working with Eddie Brock and helping the Venom symbiote against Knull and Grendel, revealing its true form and amalgamating itself with its ally before sacrificing itself in an attempt to immolate the superior symbiotes.

=== Rex Strickland in other media ===
Rex Strickland appears in Venom: The Last Dance, portrayed by Chiwetel Ejiofor. This version is a commander for the government organization Imperium, receiving orders to capture Eddie Brock and Venom. Badly wounded during the final battle against the Xenophages at the soon-to-be-shutdown Area 51, Strickland sacrifices himself to detonate the acid tanks that the Venom symbiote was holding the Xenophages under.

== Striker ==
- Further reading: Striker at the Comic Book DB (archived from the original)

Striker (Brandon Sharpe) is a character appearing in American comic books published by Marvel Comics. The character, created by Christos Gage and Mike McKone, first appeared in Avengers Academy #1 (August 2010).

Brandon becomes a child actor at a young age and is molested by his manager. During an encounter, Striker's power of electrical manipulation manifests. Norman Osborn offers Striker whatever he wants in exchange for the use of his powers. Striker is recruited into the Avengers Academy along with five other students who have been affected by Osborn. He uses this opportunity to become famous again. He, Veil, and Hazmat then hunt down the Hood and videotape him screaming for mercy under electric torture. The video gets thousands of likes on YouTube, but at first Tigra is disgusted and requests the teen get expelled. Hank convinces her to allow the kids to remain, to which she grudgingly agrees, but secretly she relishes in watching the video of Hood screaming. Later, the team fights Korvac with the bodies and strength of their older selves. A mature Striker is killed by Korvac's blast, but is then reverted to his younger self by Korvac's estranged wife, Carina. Striker has an emotional breakdown after experiencing death. After a pep talk from Tigra, he is better able to control his powers and does not fear death. He also hatches a plan to save the students from Absorbing Man and Titania's attack on the Infinity Mansion. Later on, he reveals to Julie Power that he thinks he is gay. He soon publicly announces his sexual orientation in a press conference, showing Julie his fame hungry side.

Striker later appeared as part of a new program established by Leonardo da Vinci to replace the defunct S.H.I.E.L.D.

=== Striker in other media ===
Striker appears as a playable character in Lego Marvel's Avengers.

== Strobe ==
Strobe (Julianne Worthing) is a mutant supervillain created by Louise Simonson and Rob Liefeld, debuting in New Mutants #86 (February, 1990). A member of the Mutant Liberation Front, Strobe is capable of generating light and heat, allowing her to blind, burn, and melt people and objects.

=== Strobe in other media ===
Strobe makes a non-speaking appearance in the X-Men: The Animated Series episode "Secrets, Not Long Buried" as a resident of Skull Mesa.

== Simon Stroud ==
Simon Stroud is a character appearing in American comic books published by Marvel Comics. Created by Doug Moench and George Tuska, the character first appeared in Creatures on the Loose #30 (April 1974). A mercenary trained by the CIA, Stroud has worked alongside Spider-Man and Black Widow, and has gone after John Jameson / Man-Wolf, and Morbius, the Living Vampire.

=== Simon Stroud in other media ===
Simon Stroud appears in Morbius, portrayed by Tyrese Gibson. This version is an agent of the FBI who is equipped with a cybernetic arm.

== Alistaire and Alysande Stuart ==
- Further reading: Alistaire Stuart at the Comic Book DB (archived from the original); Alistaire Stuart at the Grand Comics Database

Alistaire and Alysande Stuart are a pair of twin characters appearing in American comic books published by Marvel Comics. The characters, created by Chris Claremont and Alan Davis, first appeared in Excalibur #6 (March 1989). They are the founding members of the Weird Happenings Organization and allies of the British superhero team Excalibur. The twins are named after Brigadier Lethbridge-Stewart from Doctor Who.

The twins Alistaire and Alysande Stuart founded the Weird Happenings Organization (W.H.O.), which succeeded the Resources Control Executive (R.C.X.) as the UK's lead agency for investigating supernatural and superhuman events. The pair aided Excalibur, and Alysande also joined the Muir Island X-Men against the Reavers following X-Men's apparent deaths in "The Fall of the Mutants". During an incident with Air-Walker, Nick Fury granted Alysande limited access to S.H.I.E.L.D.'s Helicarrier surveillance systems, which W.H.O. used to track Cayre. She was later framed by R.C.X of trading secrets to S.H.I.E.L.D. and faced investigation, but she was murdered by Jamie Braddock during an Excalibur party. Her name was cleared by Alistaire, Excalibur and Nick Fury.

After his sister's death, and the removal of the corrupt head of the organization, Alistaire joined R.C.X. to look after the Warpies. He was later targeted by Black Air, but was protected by Excalibur. He was later tasked by the U.K. government to bring all paranormal affairs under a single department. He would later dissolve the department and defect to MI6 for use of their mightier resources, but was effectively stripped of all authority to investigate paranormal affairs.

An alternate universe version of Alysande known as Caledonia appeared as a member of the Captain Britain Corps, and later became Franklin Richard's nanny.

== Stunner ==
Stunner (Angelina Brancale) is a character appearing in American comic books published by Marvel Comics. She was created during the Spider-Man Clone Saga by J.M. DeMatteis and Mark Bagley and first appeared in The Amazing Spider-Man #397 (January 1995).

Stunner was originally a video store clerk but she managed to get a job working for Carolyn Trainer, a former student of Otto Octavius. She immediately fell in love with Octavius, her devotion to him only increasing when he used his virtual reality technology to make Angelina powerful and beautiful, dedicating herself to him and everything he did.

She was first seen using her virtual powers to destroy a bar. While in her Virtual form she tried to resurrect Octavius (who was killed by Kaine) after a battle with Spider-Man. As her real body was tied down into the virtual reality machine, the explosion that followed Otto's resurrection knocked her true form into a coma from which it took her years to awake from.

Upon hearing that her love, Otto Octavius, was dead again during Spider-Man: Ends of the Earth, she swore vengeance on the one responsible for it: the Superior Spider-Man (not knowing that he was Octavius's consciousness in Peter Parker's body).

== Sub-Mariner ==
Sub-Mariner is the name of several characters appearing in American comic books published by Marvel Comics.

=== Roman the Sub-Mariner ===
Roman the Sub-Mariner is the name of several characters from the Marvel 2099 realities.

==== Earth-928 Roman the Sub-Mariner ====
On Earth-928, Roman is a human/Atlantean hybrid who worked on the New Atlantis Project for the company Alchemax. He became of the leader of the renamed Nova Atlantea when he and his fellow New Atlanteans rebelled against Alchemax.

Roman was killed when Attuma led the original Atlanteans in attacking Nova Atlantea.

==== Earth-23291 Roman the Sub-Mariner ====
During the "Secret Wars" storyline, remnants of Earth-23291 were recreated as the Battleworld domain of 2099. Its version of Roman is a member of the Defenders.

==== Earth-2099 Roman the Sub-Mariner ====
In the unified Marvel 2099 reality of Earth-2099, Roman is a member of the 2099 version of the Avengers. He was killed by the Masters of Evil.

== Subbie ==
Subbie is a character appearing in American comic books published by Marvel Comics. He is an amphibious boy who grew up in the depths of the ocean and appeared in Kid Komics #1–2.

== Sublime ==
Sublime (also known as John Sublime) is a character appearing in American comic books published by Marvel Comics. A sentient bacterium, the character is usually depicted as an enemy of the X-Men and first appeared in the New X-Men Annual 2001 (September 2001), although it was later retconned into appearing as early as Marvel Comics Presents #79 (June 1991). The character was created by Grant Morrison and Leinil Francis Yu.

Sublime, alongside fellow sentient bacteria Arkea, was created by the ancient mutant society of the Threshold to aid in their war against the Unbreathing. However, the duo instead turned on their creators to infect any host possible. Cassandra Nova defeated both by allowing them to infect her body and effectively lobotomizing both bacteria, weakening them for millions of years as well as making mutants immune to them. Sublime used his influence throughout the years to shape society, as well as involving himself with anti-mutant causes. His chosen host body, named John Sublime, worked for Weapon X and created the U-Men, as well as the superhuman performance enhancing drug, Kick.

As a sentient microscopic bacterial colony, Sublime can possess the body of any living organism and manipulate both psyche and physical appearance. Other abilities include mind control, shapeshifting, and power enhancement.

=== Sublime in other media ===
- Sublime appears in Marvel Anime: X-Men, voiced by Troy Baker. This version is a human with a mechanical eye and a chief associate of the U-Men who unknowingly works for Mastermind and wields robotic armor capable of using other combatants' powers against them.
- John Sublime appears as a boss in X-Men: Destiny, voiced by Joel Spence.

== Sugar Man ==
Sugar Man is a character appearing in American comic books published by Marvel Comics. Created by writer Scott Lobdell and artist Chris Bachalo, he first appeared in Generation Next #2 (April 1995).

Sugar Man hails from the dystopian reality of the Age of Apocalypse, where Apocalypse conquered North America and set up a system in which mutants ruled. He is the head of the Core, a slave camp in Seattle.

=== Sugar Man in other media ===
- Sugar Man appears as a boss in X-Men Legends II: Rise of Apocalypse, voiced by James Arnold Taylor.
- Sugar Man appears as a boss in Marvel: Avengers Alliance.

== Sui-San ==
Sui-San is a character appearing in American comic books published by Marvel Comics. The character was created by Jim Starlin and first appeared in Captain Marvel #29 (August 1973).

Sui-San is an Eternal and the mother of Thanos. She and Thanos' father, A'lars, met after they both left their homes for Titan.

== David Sum ==
David Sum (Hui Lin) is a character appearing in American comic books published by Marvel Comics. The character was created by writer Brian Reed and artist Aaron Lopresti, and first appeared in Ms. Marvel (vol. 2) #13 (March 2007). He is an immortal agent of S.H.I.E.L.D. who works alongside Carol Danvers.

== Summoner ==
Summoner is the name of several characters appearing in American comic books published by Marvel Comics.

=== Incentaurian ===
Summoner is a figure in Inhuman legend, an Inhuman Centaurian with the power to summon monsters from across the universe. After they were defeated and killed, it was prophesized that an Inhuman would rise up to take their place in the fight against the Leviathons. This Inhuman would be Kid Kaiju, who developed powers similar to Summoner's.

=== Arakkii ===
Summoner was created by writer Jonathan Hickman and artist Leinil Francis Yu and first appeared in X-Men (vol. 5) #2 (January 2020). He is an invulnerable mutant from Arakko, the son of War and Bracken. Summoner rose to prominence as a member of the Summoners, an order of immortal priests able to summon creatures of Arakko and Amenth, and eventually rose to the highest rank within the order. As a Summoner, he is nameless, referred to only as "Summoner" or "High Summoner."

During the events of "X of Swords", Summoner is chosen to participate and helped recruit the other champions of Arakko. His first challenge was against Wolverine in a "race to death" in the realm of Blightspoke. He is killed, but wins the challenge as he was the first to die.

== Sunder ==
- Further reading: Sunder at the Comic Book DB (archived from the original)

Sunder (Mark Hallett) is a character appearing in American comic books published by Marvel Comics. The character, created by Chris Claremont and Paul Smith, first appeared in The Uncanny X-Men #169 (May 1983). He is a mutant and a member of the Morlocks.

Sunder's mutant powers give him superhuman strength, stamina and durability. He is a founding member of the Morlocks, abandoning the identity he had in the surface human world. Sunder is the aide to Callisto, the muscle of his group who is very protective of them, especially Callisto. Sunder briefly joins the "Muir Island" X-Men organized by Moira MacTaggert, but is killed by Pretty-Boy when the Reavers invade Muir Island.

=== Sunder in other media ===
Sunder appears in X-Men: The Animated Series, voiced by Dan Hennessey.

== Sunpyre ==
Sunpyre

Publication information
- Publisher: Marvel Comics
- First appearance: The Uncanny X-Men #392 (April 2001)
- Created by: Scott Lobdell; Salvador Larroca

In-story information
- Alter ego: Leyu Yoshida
- Species: Human mutant
- Team affiliations: Genoshan Assault X-Men; X-Corps; Big Hero 6
- Abilities: Flight, Plasma blasts: Ability to view infrared; Radiation immunity

Sunpyre (Leyu Yoshida (吉田 玲優, Yoshida Reyu)) is a character appearing in American comic books published by Marvel Comics. The character is commonly associated with the X-Men and is the sister of Sunfire (Shiro Yoshida).

Leyu Yoshida and Shiro were born to a mother who suffered radiation poisoning due to exposure to the atomic bombings of Hiroshima and Nagasaki. As a result, she and her brother were born mutants, possessing identical powers. Her brother would go on to be the well-known Japanese superhero Sunfire. Leyu first appeared during the X-Men: Eve of Destruction storyline, when she joined the X-Men for a single mission, to help fight Magneto. After the mission is completed successfully, Sunpyre chooses to return to her home instead of staying in the United States with the "arrogant" X-Men.

Banshee later asks her to join his X-Corps (again replacing Sunfire, who did not want to join). This time she is removed from the front lines and instead spends most of her time in the laboratory studying the mutant Abyss. Sunpyre is killed by Mystique, who had infiltrated the group.

== Sunstreak ==
Sunstreak is the name of two characters in Marvel Comics.

=== Jenny Burke ===
The first Sunstreak first appeared in Nightwatch #5 and was created by Terry Kavanagh, Mark Tenney, and Thomas Florimonte.

Dr. Jenny Burke is a research scientist who developed the Solar Transducer, a source of energy. Her employers at Morelle Pharmaceuticals attempt to prevent her from going ahead with the Transducer by sending security guard Roger Flint to destroy it. The resulting explosion bonds Burke to the Transducer, giving her light-based superpowers; her employers frame her for the explosion while branding her an eco-terrorist.

=== Andrea Roarke ===
The second Sunstreak first appeared in Iron Man #330 (July 1996) and was created by Terry Kavanagh and Jim Cheung. Her real name was not revealed until the release of the one-shot Dark Reign Files (2009).

Sunstreak is a fiery woman of indeterminate backstory with a fiery body and the ability to emit a solar lance from her hand. She is introduced as part of the supervillain group Stockpile, alongside Brass, Joust, Unicorn, and Calico. After the Civil War, Sunstreak registers under the Initiative training program, where she befriends Butterball. After Camp Hammond is shut down, Sunstreak is placed on the Initiative team for Oregon, Force of Nature.

== Sunstroke ==
- Further reading: Sunstroke at the Comic Book DB (archived from the original); Sunstroke at the Grand Comics Database

Sunstroke (Sol Brodstroke) is a character appearing in American comic books published by Marvel Comics. The character, created by Steve Englehart and Al Milgrom, first appeared in West Coast Avengers #17 (February 1987).

Sunstroke is originally a minion of Dominus, and has the ability to absorb solar energy and release it as blinding flashes of light or projections of heat. Sunstroke has also been a member of the Masters of Evil and the Lethal Legion.

== Super Sabre ==
Super Sabre (Martin Fletcher) is a character appearing in American comic books published by Marvel Comics. His first appearance was in The Uncanny X-Men #215.

Martin Fletcher was born in Massachusetts. During World War II, as Super Sabre he fought against the Axis powers alongside Stonewall, Crimson Commando, and Yankee Clipper. Following the war, Super Sabre along with the Commando and Stonewall continued to fight crime. They even hoped to join the Human Torch in fighting communists, but government officials were concerned that the overenthusiastic heroes would cause a real war. The government requested that the trio retire, which they reluctantly did. Super Sabre is later killed by Aminedi.

== Supercharger ==
- Further reading: Supercharger at the Comic Book DB (archived from the original); Supercharger at the Grand Comics Database

Supercharger (Ronnie Hilliard) is a character appearing in American comic books published by Marvel Comics. The character, created by Kurt Busiek, and Paul Lee, first appeared in Amazing Fantasy #17 (January 1996). He is an enemy of Spider-Man and chronologically the first supervillain Spider-Man encountered.

Ronnie Hilliard gains superpowers in a generator explosion that kills his father. Calling himself Supercharger, he is a "living battery" capable of absorbing, storing, and releasing great amounts of electricity. He can discharge this energy through physical contact or as destructive lightning-like bolts. He battles the Fantastic Four and Spider-Man. Supercharger is later seen as a member of the Masters of Evil organized by Crimson Cowl. Supercharger, alongside the rest of the Masters of Evil members, is defeated by the Thunderbolts.

Supercharger is among the villains who are killed by Black Ant and Hank Pym and revived to join the Lethal Legion.

== Supergiant ==
- First appearance: Infinity #1 (October 2013)
- Created by: Jonathan Hickman, Jerome Opeña
- Species: Psionic entity (unknown alien race)
- Teams: Black Order
- Abilities: Mental control Intangibility; Telepathy
- Further reading: Supergiant at Comic Vine; Supergiant at League of Comic Geeks; Supergiant at the Comic Book DB (archived from the original); Supergiant at Marvel Database

Supergiant is a supervillain appearing in American comic books published by Marvel Comics. Created by Jonathan Hickman and Jerome Opeña, Supergiant first appeared in Infinity #1 (October 2013).

Supergiant is a member of Thanos' supervillain team Black Order. In the Infinity storyline, Supergiant and Corvus Glaive attack the Jean Grey School for Higher Learning while searching for Thane. They leave after realizing that Thane is not there.

When the Black Order seizes control of Wakanda, Supergiant takes control of Black Bolt's mind and forces him to activate the Illuminati's hidden bombs. When the Illuminati arrive to save Black Bolt, Supergiant uses Black Bolt's ability to defeat the heroes. Upon activating the bomb, Supergiant is faced by Maximus, who has the trigger. Maximus triggers the bomb, but has Lockjaw transport Supergiant and the bomb to a distant uninhabited planet, where Supergiant is killed in the explosion.

In the storyline "No Surrender", Supergiant returns as a psychic projection and works with the Challenger, who sets the Black Order up against Grandmaster's Lethal Legion.

=== Supergiant in other media ===
==== Television ====
- Supergiant appears in Avengers Assemble, voiced by Hynden Walch.
- Supergiant appears in Guardians of the Galaxy, voiced again by Hynden Walch. This version possesses size-manipulation abilities and is a former lover of Star-Lord.

==== Video games ====
- Supergiant appears as a mini-boss in Marvel: Avengers Alliance.
- Supergiant appears as a boss and unlockable playable character in Marvel Future Fight.
- Supergiant appears as a playable character in Lego Marvel Super Heroes 2 as part of the Infinity War DLC.
- Supergiant appears as a boss in Marvel Ultimate Alliance 3: The Black Order, voiced again by Hynden Walch.
- Supergiant appears in Marvel Snap.

== Superia ==
Superia is a character appearing in American comic books published by Marvel Comics.

Little is known of the past of the woman known as Superia, but she was first seen where she and a small army of female supervillains plotted to sterilize all other women in the world, making their reproductive capabilities valuable beyond measure. She was initially inspired to use her scientific knowledge to conquer the world when she discovered, via use of a "time probe", that a descendant of hers, Thundra, would rule the world-spanning matriarchy of the "Femizons". Her plan was thwarted by Captain America and his allies (Paladin, Diamondback, Asp and Black Mamba).

She later appeared alongside a much smaller group of Femizons, consisting of Blackbird, Iron Maiden, Nightshade and Snapdragon. This group fought against the criminal scientists of Advanced Idea Mechanics (A.I.M.), and were defeated, thanks in part to former Femizon Maria Pym. Superia was saved from certain death by Captain America.

Superia reappeared years later as the leader of H.A.M.M.E.R. She took the leadership role after Norman Osborn, former leader of H.A.M.M.E.R., was taken into custody. The New Avengers captured her after getting a tip from Victoria Hand. When Osborn escaped from the Raft, he broke Superia out also. She immediately joined Norman Osborn's second incarnation of the Dark Avengers as Ms. Marvel.

Superia joins the High Council of A.I.M. as the Minister of Education in Bagalia, a country run and populated by supervillains.

== Superior ==
Superior is a name of several characters appearing in American comic books published by Marvel Comics. The name has also been used in other related media.

=== Jonathan Gallagher ===
The Superior (Jonathan Gallagher) is an enemy of Comet Man. The character, created by Bill Mumy, Miguel Ferrer and Kelley Jones, first appeared in Comet Man #1 (February 1987).

John Gallagher was born to Jack Beckley and his unnamed fiancée. Jack went to fight in the South Pacific while his fiancée gave birth to John and put him up for adoption. Jack was unaware of John's existence and went on to marry his fiancée and had Stephen and Rosemary. Years later, John formed a government group called The Bridge and adopted the name The Superior. He traced his father, but he did not believe that John was his son, so he killed his father by staging a plane crash. He went up against his brother, Stephen, by kidnapping his son Benny, but was killed.

=== Bastards of Evil version ===
- Further reading: Superior at the Comic Book DB (archived from the original); Superior at the Grand Comics Database

The Superior is a supervillain in Marvel Comics. The character, created by Sean McKeever and David Baldeon, first appeared in Young Allies Volume 2, #2 (September 2010).

The Superior is a ten-year-old child who claims to be the son of the Leader, and possesses a similar appearance to him. He forms the Bastards of Evil, a group of individuals who were supposedly abandoned by their supervillain parents.

=== Superior in other media ===
Superior appears in Agents of S.H.I.E.L.D., portrayed by Zach McGowan. This version is a former SVR member named Anton Ivanov and leader of the Watchdogs.

== Supernova ==
Supernova is the name of several characters appearing in American comic books published by Marvel Comics.

=== Garthan Saal ===
Supernova

Publication information
- Publisher: Marvel Comics
- First appearance: The Avengers #301 (March 1988)
- Created by: Tom DeFalco (writer – artist)

In-story information
- Full name: Garthan Saal
- Species: Xandarian
- Place of origin: Xandar
- Team affiliations: Nova Corps
- Abilities: Gravametric manipulation

Garthan Saal, also known as Supernova and Nova Omega, first appeared as an antagonist in The Avengers #301 in 1988.

Garthan Saal, a member of the Nova Corps, was one of the few Xandarians who survived the destruction of Xandar at the hands of Nebula. Saal contained the power of the entire Nova Corps within his body which increased him to the size of a giant and drove him mad. Saal's desire for revenge against Nebula led him on a quest to track her down and exact his revenge.

Saal attacks Richard Rider, a former member of the Nova Corps, and drains his powers, effectively killing him. Rider is resurrected by Air-Walker, who joins him in battling Supernova. Rider is convinced to relinquish the Nova Force and restore the Xandarian Worldmind, who resurrects the Xandarians. Saal is assigned to operate on Earth and took the name Nova Omega. Saal is later killed by Volx, queen of the Dire Wraiths, thus returning the Nova Force to Richard Rider.

=== Estrella Lopez ===
In flashbacks revolving around the Superior Spider-Man, he was looking for an assistant in a project. He gained one in an Empire State University student named Estrella Lopez is a student of Empire State University who worked as an assistant to Otto Octavius. When the two's work was complete and their miniature star was placed in a dodecahedron, Lopez is infuriated that Octavius took the credit. She takes the miniature star, causing a blackout as its energies transform her. Octavius finds Lopez transformed into an energy state.

=== Supernova in other media ===
Garthan Saal appears in Guardians of the Galaxy, portrayed by Peter Serafinowicz. This version is the commander of the Nova Corps' fighter fleet until he is killed by Ronan the Accuser.

== Hydra Supreme ==
The Hydra Supreme, also known as Supreme Hydra, Imperial Hydra, Supreme Leader, Civil Warrior, and Captain Hydra, are aliases used by several characters appearing in American comic books published by Marvel Comics. It is the name given to a leader of a branch and splinter group of Hydra.

=== Arnold Brown ===
Arnold Brown is the Imperial Hydra that was the organization's figurehead.

=== Second version ===
An unnamed Shinto Imperialist was the first leader of Hydra. He was killed by Baron Strucker, who usurped his position.

=== Third version ===
An unnamed leader tried to destroy the Hulk.

=== Sn'Tlo ===
Sn'Tlo was created by Mark Waid and Ron Garney, and first appeared in Captain America (vol. 3) #3 (January 1998). He is a Skrull who infiltrated Hydra initially as the Sensational Hydra and ultimately impersonated Captain America.

=== Edgar Lascombe ===
Edgar Lascombe was created by J. Michael Straczynski, and first appeared in The Amazing Spider-Man #521 (June 2005). He is the Supreme Hydra that was responsible for the Hydra Four.

=== Leopold Zola ===
Leopold Zola, created by Rick Remender and Roland Boschi, and first appeared in Hail Hydra #1 (July 2015). He is Arnim Zola's genetic-engineered son seen during the 2015 Secret Wars crossover event. Captain Hydra is in a warzone where Hydra has been in power, fighting Nomad and Ellie Rogers.

=== Hydra Supreme in other media ===
A variation of Captain Hydra appears in Iron Man and Captain America: Heroes United as the brainwashed form of Steve Rogers.

== Brenda Swanson ==
Brenda Swanson is a character appearing in American comic books published by Marvel Comics. The character, created by Kaare Andrews, first appeared in Iron Fist: The Living Weapon #1 (June 2014).

Brenda Swanson was born from an affair between Harold Meachum and a cleaner. When Brenda was a child, Meachum promised to leave his family to be with her and her mother after returning from his trip to the Himalayas with his business partner Wendell Rand and Rand's family. In actuality, Meachum was traveling to K'un-L'un, where he murdered Rand and left Rand's surviving family for dead. When Meachum returned, he cut off all contact from Brenda and her mother, causing her to blame the Rands. Meachum left Brenda with a small inheritance after his death, and after her mother died, Brenda used her resources to train in martial arts and assassination, becoming a renowned mercenary in the process. After years of training and planning, she decided to enact revenge on Rand's surviving family, his son Danny, the Iron Fist of K'un-Lun.

Posing as a journalist, Brenda interviews and later begins a sexual relationship with Danny to get closer to him. Despite her ulterior motives, she assists Iron Fist in his conflict with The One and the Steel Serpent and looks after his student and ward, Pei, whom she affectionally nicknames "Kung Fu Girl". After months of dating, Brenda makes her move to assassinate Danny while on a date and reveals her past to him. Realizing that Danny had genuinely fallen in love with her, Brenda finds herself unable to kill him and prepares to shoot herself in the head to punish him, but he catches the bullet; Brenda disappears afterwards.

Brenda later finds herself in the mystical dimension of Kamaloka, where she is forced to participate in gladiatorial matches. Pei and her classmate Jayce are also transported to Kamaloka, but despite her grudge against Danny, Brenda helps Pei in battle long enough for Danny to summon them back to Earth.

Brenda forms an alliance with the Hierophant and agrees to collect the hearts of the dragons of the Seven Capital Cities of Heaven in exchange for being granted power to kill Iron Fist. Taking on the name Yama Dragonsbane, Brenda hunts down and kills the dragons and despite Iron Fist's and the Immortal Weapons' efforts, she provides the Hierophant with enough dragon hearts that empower him with their chi. Although the Hierophant empowers Brenda with dragon chi, they are defeated by the chi-empowered Okoye; the resulting clash of chi results in the Hierophant's death and the hearts of the dragons Brenda slain being restored. In addition to losing her dragon chi, Brenda also loses her hands and is blinded, driving her partially insane and furthering her hatred of the Rands.

== Sway ==
Sway (Suzanne Chan) is a character appearing in American comic books published by Marvel Comics. She first appeared in X-Men: Deadly Genesis #3 as one of the "Missing X-Men". She was created by writer Ed Brubaker and artist Pete Woods.

Originally from Hong Kong, David and Emily Chan became naturalized citizens of the United States after living twenty years in California. They had a daughter named Suzanne, who, at 17 years old, wanted to attend Barnard College on the east coast of the United States and planned a trip to New York City to prove to her parents that she would be safe on her own after moving. During the trip, David and Emily were gunned down in a crossfire between gangs in Chinatown. Although standing a few feet from her parents, Suzanne was unscathed, which perplexed police detectives.

After the shooting, Suzanne entered a state of shock. She could only dwell on the fact that when the shooting started, she had somehow stopped the bullets in midair and was able to get herself out of the path of the bullets. In actuality, she had stopped time around the bullets, effectively freezing them in place. Unfortunately, she was unable to do the same for her parents and could only watch as the bullets tore into them.

The police placed the traumatized girl in a hospital for forty-eight-hour observation, during which she mostly slept and cried. When she was released, she was told that the police were looking into things, but they did not have any leads. Wandering the streets, she returned to the spot where her parents were killed. Suddenly, her mutant powers activated again, and she was able to see past events in the area, namely the phantoms of herself and her parents. After witnessing the shooting for a second time, Suzanne followed the phantom car, carrying her parents' murderers, throughout the city. She then realized that she somehow had chronokinesis (the ability to manipulate time), and she was making it replay itself for her. Suzanne later joins the X-Men, but is killed by a golem that was created by Krakoa.

Sway possesses the ability to decelerate, stop, and accelerate time around her body, as well as a form of retrocognition that allows her to replay the recent pasts as short bursts of ghostly images. By focusing carefully, Suzanne is able to slow down and stop objects entirely, enabling her to freeze projectiles in mid-air, immobilize her enemies, and various other effects. Suzanne's training honed her abilities to the point where she can target specific objects in her range or everything within a certain radius.

== Sydren ==
Sydren is a character appearing in American comic books published by Marvel Comics. The character, created by Joss Whedon and John Cassaday, first appeared in Astonishing X-Men (vol. 3) #10 (May 2005). An alien from the planet Drenx, he is an agent of S.W.O.R.D. Sydren assisted Abigail Brand in various matters, such as dealing with Danger, Cassandra Nova and Henry Peter Gyrich.

=== Sydren in other media ===
Sydren appears in The Avengers: Earth's Mightiest Heroes, voiced by Troy Baker.

== S'ym ==
S'ym is a character appearing in American comic books published by Marvel Comics. He is depicted as a demon of Limbo who served as a frequent enemy and sometimes supporting character in The Uncanny X-Men and The New Mutants. He was created as an homage to Cerebus the Aardvark.

S'ym was a minion of Belasco, the ruler of the demonic dimension known as Otherplace or Demonic Limbo. S'ym battles the X-Men when the team is transported to Limbo via teleportation "discs" in their search for Magik, the younger sister of the X-Man Colossus.

During Magik's seven years in Limbo, Belasco takes her as his heir and apprentice. She ultimately defeats him, becoming Limbo's new ruler, and S'ym's master, before returning to the X-Men. S'ym challenges Magik's newfound status as Limbo's ruler. Magik defeats S'ym, leaving S'ym to agree to serve Magik whenever she visits Limbo. S'ym allies himself with the extraterrestrial Magus, allowing himself to be infected with a techno-organic virus. Though Magik tries to take Limbo back from him several times after this, she is unable to defeat him and S'ym's hold on Limbo only increases as he spreads the techno-organic virus to other demons.

== Symbie ==
Symbie is a character appearing in American comic books published by Marvel Comics. The character was created by writer Joe Kelly and artist Pepe Larraz, and made a cameo appearance in Timeslide #1 (December 2024) before officially debuting in The Amazing Spider-Man (vol. 7) #11 (September 2025).

Symbie is a young symbiote who was one of several aliens experimented on by Xanto Starblood on another planet. It is freed by Spider-Man during his travels through space and becomes fond of him, to his annoyance.

=== Symbie in other media ===
Symbie appears in Spidey and His Amazing Friends, voiced by Ben Pronsky.

== Syzya of the Smoke ==
Syzya of the Smoke is a character appearing in American comic books published by Marvel Comics, created by Al Ewing and Stefano Caselli. She is an mutant from Arakko who can teleport, leaving behind a puff of smoke. Syzya is imprisoned by Tarn the Uncaring at a young age with her sister Zsora because of their powers. When she reaches adulthood, she, her sister, and her brother-in-law the Fisher King secretly reform the Night Table of the Great Ring of Arakko and work to bring down Tarn and subvert Annihilation's tyrannical rule over Arakko.

After Arakko is freed from Annihilation's rule, returned to Earth, and later relocated to Mars, Syzya travels to the new Planet Arakko. She joins Storm's Brotherhood of Arakko to defend the planet from Uranos.

== Margali Szardos ==
Margali Szardos, also known as the Red Queen, is a character appearing in American comic books published by Marvel Comics. She first appeared in Uncanny X-Men Annual #4 (1980), and was created by writer Chris Claremont and artist John Romita Jr. based on sketches by John Byrne. She is the adoptive mother of Nightcrawler and the biological mother of Amanda Sefton.

Her past is an enigma. She was supposedly born in Paris, France as a Manouche girl and taught magic by her mother, but she has yet to reveal her true origins. Margali's particular discipline of magic is called The Winding Way.

Because of Margali's indiscriminate use of magic, she and Amanda part ways on tense terms. Following Nightcrawler's resurrection and reunion with Amanda, Margali begins to lust for the secrets of the afterlife. For this purpose, she engineers an attack by a quasi-robotic villain called Trimega, pushing Nightcrawler into granting her sanctuary at the Jean Grey School for Higher Learning.

Margali is hired by Orchis, who have her cast a spell to transform mutants into monsters. This spell also affects Kurt, enabling Orchis to use him to kill several anti-mutant officials to frame mutantkind. When Margali tries to prevent Legion from rescuing Kurt, she is stopped by Mother Righteous, who had made a pact with Margali in the past and calls upon the debt incurred with it by imprisoning Margali's essence in an energy sphere.

=== Powers and abilities of Margali Szardos ===
Margali Szardos is an accomplished sorceress, equal of almost any sorcerer on Earth, occupying the highest position of "The Winding Way" which grants mystic power, but that power ebbs and flows unpredictably, affecting the strength of Margali's magic. Margali can cast spells and transform herself. As the Red Queen, she manifested her magic as a flaming sword, could extend her nails into long talons, and fire blasts of red arcane energy.

=== Margali Szardos in other media ===
Margali Szardos appears in the X-Men: Evolution episode "The Toad, the Witch and the Wardrobe", voiced by Teryl Rothery.
