= Lloyd Bloch =

Marvel Comics fictional character

- Lloyd Bloch / Moonstone as depicted in Captain America #170 (February 1974). Art by Gil Kane.

Publication information
- Publisher: Marvel Comics
- First appearance: Captain America #169 (January 1974)
- Created by: Steve Englehart and Mike Friedrich (story) & Sal Buscema (art)

In-story information
- Alter ego: Lloyd Bloch
- Species: Human mutate
- Team affiliations: Secret Empire; Maggia
- Notable aliases: Moonstone, Nefarius, Byron Becton
- Abilities: As Nefarius: Superhuman strength, durability, speed, and stamina; Laser vision; As Moonstone: Gravimetric powers derived from alien gem

Lloyd Bloch, also known as Moonstone and Nefarius, is a supervillain appearing in American comic books published by Marvel Comics.

== Publication history ==
The character first appeared in Captain America #169 (1974) and was created by writers Steve Englehart and Mike Friedrich and artist Sal Buscema.

== Fictional character biography ==
Lloyd Bloch is an agent of the second Secret Empire, who intend to discredit Captain America and take his place as America's "symbolic" hero. The Empire had previously damaged Cap's reputation by accusing him of vigilantism and framing him for the death of small-time criminal Tumbler. Bloch, utilizing an alien stone recovered from the Moon, becomes known as Moonstone and poses as a superhero. During the Secret Empire's "attack" on the White House, Moonstone claims that he could not defeat their plans, intending to discourage resistance from the public. Moonstone is subsequently exposed and stopped by Captain America while Falcon, Cyclops, and Marvel Girl take out the rest of the Empire's soldiers. Bloch's psychiatrist, Dr. Karla Sofen, manipulates him into giving up his stone, then takes it for herself and becomes the second Moonstone.

Bloch later resurfaces with ionic powers similar to those of Wonder Man. Now known as Nefarius, he claims to be the son of Count Nefaria. Nefarius captures Sofen and plans to kill her in revenge, but is stopped by Sofen and sent to the Vault. Bloch is later killed by Nefaria, who drains him of energy.

== Powers and abilities ==
Bloch possesses superhuman physical abilities derived from a lunar stone that is imbued with unknown energy. After losing the stone, he regains his powers via a mutagenic process created by Dr. Kenneth Sturdy and gains the additional ability to generate intense heat beams from his eyes.

Bloch is a formidable hand-to-hand combatant, and received extensive unarmed combat training from the second Secret Empire.

== Other versions ==
During the Thunderbolts' journey on Counter-Earth, Sofen encountered Bloch's counterpart who went by the codename Phantom Eagle. The alternate Bloch became obsessed with Moonstone and began experiencing psychotic episodes and was exposed as a serial killer. Sofen proceeded to steal his equivalent stone too.
