= Tumbler (comics) =

Tumbler is the name of four fictional characters appearing in American comic books published by Marvel Comics.

== Publication history ==
John Keane first appeared in Tales of Suspense #83 (Nov 1966) and was created by Stan Lee and Jack Kirby.

== Fictional character biography ==
=== John Keane ===
Tumbler

Publication information
- Publisher: Marvel Comics
- First appearance: Tales of Suspense #83 (Nov 1966)
- Created by: Stan Lee (writer); Jack Kirby (artist)

In-story information
- Alter ego: John Robert Keane
- Species: Human
- Team affiliations: Secret Empire
- Abilities: Exceptional acrobatic skills

John Keane is a costumed criminal acrobat. Intending to test himself against Captain America, he breaks into the Avengers Mansion. He easily beats Captain America in two separate struggles; however, this turns out to be the Super-Adaptoid, who had taken Captain America's form and lacked his fighting skills. The real Captain America escapes from the Adaptoid's trap and defeats the Tumbler in combat.

Later, Quentin Harderman hired the Tumbler to play a part in the Secret Empire's plot to discredit Captain America. The Tumbler robs a store, and Captain America tries to capture him, but the Tumbler escapes. The next day, John Keane in civilian clothes meets Captain America at a charity boxing match; he recognizes Keane, who runs. Captain America knocks Keane down with his shield, and as the two struggle, the first Moonstone shoots and kills Keane with a micro laser under orders from Harderman while hiding out of sight. Harderman accuses Captain America of murdering the Tumbler as part of the scheme to discredit him.

=== Spider-Squad ===
The second Tumbler is a member of the Spider-Squad.

=== Michael Keane ===
It is later revealed that John Keane was using the money that he had taken as the Tumbler to pay for his mother's living expenses and her home, and his brother Michael was serving in the army at the time. John had also taken out a million-dollar life insurance policy with Guardian Life Insurance. When Michael tries to collect on this policy, Guardian Life Insurance refuses to pay the claim, since John was killed while involved in illegal acts. Michael trains hard and takes on his brother's identity as the Tumbler, getting Captain America's help to expose the insurance company's fraud.

=== Unnamed man ===
After receiving Tumbler's gear from Michael Keane, Roderick Kingsley sells it to an unnamed criminal. Tumbler, Ringer, and Steeplejack are shown to be in the services of Roderick Kingsley. They are later ambushed by the Goblin King's servants Menace and Monster (the "Goblin" form of Carlie Cooper).
