= Glom =

Glom may refer to:

- Great Lakes Outlaw Modifieds, a kind of modified stock car
- Glom, a member of the Imperial Guard, a fictional army of superpowered beings in the Marvel Comics universe
