= Smasher (Marvel Comics) =

- The Vril Rokk incarnation of Smasher as depicted in X-Men Spotlight on... Starjammers #2 (June 1990). Art by Dave Cockrum.

Publication information
- Publisher: Marvel Comics
- First appearance: Rokk: X-Men #107 (October 1977); Tuur: War of Kings #1 (March 2009); Third Smasher: War of Kings #3 (May 2009); Kane: Avengers (vol. 5) #1 (December 2012)
- Created by: Chris Claremont and Dave Cockrum

In-story information
- Alter ego: Vril Rokk; Salac Tuur; Unrevealed; Isabel "Izzy" Kane
- Species: Alien; Human (Kane)
- Team affiliations: All: Imperial Guard; Kane: Avengers
- Abilities: Superhuman strength via cosmic radiation absorption Ability to download additional powers via exospex Flight via anti-gravity "flight patches"

Smasher is the name of several fictional characters appearing in American comic books published by Marvel Comics, primarily in association with the Imperial Guard and the X-Men.

== Publication history ==
Smasher first appeared in X-Men #107 (October 1977-February 1978), and was created by Chris Claremont and Dave Cockrum. He and the Imperial Guard are based on the Legion of Super-Heroes from DC Comics, with Smasher being based on Ultra Boy. The name of the first Smasher, Vril Rokk, is derived from DC Comics characters Vril Dox and Cosmic Boy (Rokk Krinn).

A new Smasher, named Isabel Kane, appears as a member of the Avengers in the Marvel NOW! relaunch. Her name was originally given as "Isabel Dare", but the collected edition of her first appearance said her surname was "Kane". According to editor Tom Brevoort, this change was deliberate; he even stated that "Dare was a mistake in the first place," as the character was intended to be Captain Terror's granddaughter from her first appearance. Smasher appeared prominently in the series Avengers World as part of the Avengers.

== Fictional character biography ==
=== Vril Rokk ===
The first Smasher is Vril Rokk, who had a long, distinguished service with the Imperial Guard.

In flashbacks depicted in Untold Tales of Captain Marvel, a small division of the Guard - Smasher, Deathbolt, Fang, and Oracle - are selected to guard the personage of Deathbird, the ruler of the Shi'ar.

When Cassandra Nova is devastating the Shi'ar empire, Smasher personally protects empress Lilandra Neramani. Under protest, Smasher is ordered to travel to Earth to warn the X-Men about the threat posed by Nova. However, he does not make it to the X-Men until well after they are attacked by the Imperial Guard, who have been brainwashed by Nova.

=== Salac Tuur ===
Vril Rokk is soon replaced with another Smasher, Salac Tuur. Smasher is among the Imperial Guardsmen who attack the Kree homeworld during the wedding of Crystal and Ronan the Accuser. During the battle, Smasher is killed by Karnak.

=== Third Smasher ===
The uniform and title of Smasher is passed onto an unidentified member of the original's race, who is later killed by Gladiator during a raid by the Starjammers and Guardians of the Galaxy.

=== Izzy Kane ===
A new Smasher appears in the Marvel Now! relaunch as part of Captain America's new Avengers line-up. She joins the Avengers to help fight Ex Nihilo on Mars. She is revealed to be Isabel "Izzy" Kane, a college student and astronomer from Iowa. After finding a pair of high-tech goggles that had been left behind in a cornfield by Vril Rokk when he crashed to Earth, Izzy becomes the new Smasher.

Following an eight-month timeskip in the Time Runs Out storyline, Smasher and teammate Cannonball have a son named Josiah. She later rejoins with an Avengers team headed by Sunspot and Thor. Their goal is to find the threat causing the slow death of the multiverse and to kill it. This brings Smasher in direct opposition with Captain America's group.

=== Monster ===
A new Smasher not affiliated with the Imperial Guard was introduced in Monsters Unleashed. This version is the composite form of Kid Kaiju and his monster creations Slizzik, Hi-Vo, Aegis, Scragg, and Mekara. They come together to battle the Leviathon Mother when the Leviathon Tide invades Earth.

== Powers and abilities ==
Smasher possesses the innate ability to increase physical strength by absorbing cosmic radiation. The flight patches and exospex goggles give Smasher flight, superhuman strength and durability, X-ray vision, and the ability to travel into hyperspace. This equipment enables Smasher to use only one of these abilities at a time.

== Other versions ==
=== X-Men: The End ===
An unidentified future version of Smasher appears in X-Men: The End, where he is killed in battle along with a small group of other Guardians.

=== Star Trek/X-Men ===
An unidentified version of Smasher appears in Star Trek/X-Men.

=== Dead X-Men ===
In a potential future designated as Moira II.4, Josiah Guthrie succeeds Izzy Kane as Smasher after she and Cannonball are killed.

== In other media ==
The first Smasher makes non-speaking cameo appearances in X-Men: The Animated Series.
