= The Classic Marvel Figurine Collection =

Magazine series

- Cover to #1, featuring Spider-Man, 2008
- Categories: Comics
- Publisher: Eaglemoss Publications
- First issue: 2005
- Final issue Number: 2012; 14 years ago 200
- Company: Marvel Comics
- Country: United States
- Based in: Marvel Comics characters
- Language: English

The Classic Marvel Figurine Collection was a magazine series published by Eaglemoss Publications from 2005 to 2012, through which consumers can collect hand-painted lead figurines of the Marvel Comics characters. The figurines were produced at a 1:21 scale, so that regular figurines have a height around 9 cm (3.5 in). Bigger figurines were also produced: bulky characters like the Hulk were considered as Specials while giant characters like Galactus were called Mega Specials. Double Packs consisting of two figurines of related characters were also released.

The collection was released in various countries such as Australia, the United Kingdom, Ireland, Italy, Greece, France, South Africa, Spain, Brazil, Poland, and the USA. Confusingly not all areas have seen the characters released in the same order. For example, depending on area, #8 features the Green Goblin or Daredevil.

Subscribers received three other pieces of memorabilia and also special issues throughout the year. The online service, based in the United Kingdom, prohibited the items to be sold to American buyers, however the figures could be obtained through several comic book speciality stores in the United States. The collection ended with issue 200.

== Issues ==
Each issue comes with a magazine of 20 pages (issues 1–100) which was later reduced to 16 pages (issues 101–200)and (issues 200) . Issues are listed in the order of release from the website.

- Issue 1: Spider-Man
- Issue 2: Wolverine
- Issue 3: Doctor Octopus
- Issue 4: The Thing
- Issue 5: Magneto
- Issue 6: Blade
- Issue 7: Silver Surfer
- Issue 8: Green Goblin
- Issue 9: Captain America
- Issue 10: Doctor Doom
- Issue 11: Jean Grey – variant available (Forbidden Planet exclusive only)
- Issue 12: Iron Man
- Issue 13: Daredevil
- Issue 14: Storm
- Issue 15: Thor
- Issue 16: Beast
- Issue 17: Elektra
- Issue 18: Human Torch
- Issue 19: Punisher
- Issue 20: Black Cat
- Issue 21: Captain Britain
- Issue 22: Ghost Rider
- Issue 23: Kraven the Hunter
- Issue 24: Mephisto
- Issue 25: Cyclops
- Issue 26: Ultron
- Issue 27: Sandman
- Issue 28: Mister Fantastic
- Issue 29: Rogue
- Issue 30: Black Panther
- Issue 31: Angel – variant available (Forbidden Planet exclusive only)
- Issue 32: Venom
- Issue 33: Iceman
- Issue 34: Red Skull
- Issue 35: Gambit
- Issue 36: Namor
- Issue 37: Loki
- Issue 38: She-Hulk
- Issue 39: Mystique
- Issue 40: Doctor Strange
- Issue 41: Invisible Woman
- Issue 42: Nightcrawler
- Issue 43: Medusa
- Issue 44: Iron Fist
- Issue 45: Shadowcat and Lockheed
- Issue 46: Captain Marvel (Genis-Vell) – variant available
- Issue 47: Emma Frost
- Issue 48: Vision
- Issue 49: Bullseye
- Issue 50: Hawkeye
- Issue 51: Nick Fury
- Issue 52: Lizard
- Issue 53: Polaris
- Issue 54: Nova
- Issue 55: Scarlet Witch
- Issue 56: Deadpool
- Issue 57: Mysterio
- Issue 58: Yellowjacket
- Issue 59: Luke Cage
- Issue 60: Super-Skrull
- Issue 61: Spider-Woman (Jessica Drew)
- Issue 62: Electro
- Issue 63: Cable
- Issue 64: Dormammu
- Issue 65: Black Bolt
- Issue 66: Psylocke
- Issue 67: Vulture
- Issue 68: Hercules
- Issue 69: Leader
- Issue 70: Carnage
- Issue 71: Quicksilver – variant available (exclusive in France)
- Issue 72: Black Widow
- Issue 73: Kang the Conqueror
- Issue 74: Havok
- Issue 75: Falcon and Redwing
- Issue 76: Ms. Marvel
- Issue 77: Sentry
- Issue 78: Crystal
- Issue 79: Wonder Man
- Issue 80: Mister Sinister
- Issue 81: Mole Man
- Issue 82: Moon Knight
- Issue 83: Deathlok
- Issue 84: Sabretooth
- Issue 85: Winter Soldier
- Issue 86: Scorpion
- Issue 87: Lady Deathstrike
- Issue 88: Absorbing Man
- Issue 89: Guardian
- Issue 90: Adam Warlock
- Issue 91: Shocker
- Issue 92: Bishop
- Issue 93: Valkyrie
- Issue 94: Mandarin
- Issue 95: Impossible Man
- Issue 96: Nighthawk
- Issue 97: Blink
- Issue 98: Gladiator
- Issue 99: Morbius
- Issue 100: Banshee
- Issue 101: War Machine
- Issue 102: Hobgoblin
- Issue 103: Baron Zemo
- Issue 104: Taskmaster
- Issue 105: Doc Samson
- Issue 106: Jamie Madrox
- Issue 107: Union Jack
- Issue 108: Man-Wolf
- Issue 109: Ikaris
- Issue 110: Machine Man
- Issue 111: Shang-Chi
- Issue 112: Black Knight
- Issue 113: Hellcat
- Issue 114: Viper (Madame Hydra)
- Issue 115: Dazzler
- Issue 116: Chameleon
- Issue 117: X-23
- Issue 118: Tigra
- Issue 119: Jocasta
- Issue 120: Jubilee
- Issue 121: Jack of Hearts
- Issue 122: Crimson Dynamo
- Issue 123: Enchantress
- Issue 124: Gladiator (Melvin Potter)
- Issue 125: Sunfire
- Issue 126: Titania
- Issue 127: Gorgon
- Issue 128: X-Man
- Issue 129: Ant-Man (Scott Lang)
- Issue 130: Klaw
- Issue 131: Grim Reaper
- Issue 132: Annihilus
- Issue 133: Drax the Destroyer
- Issue 134: Son of Satan
- Issue 135: Nomad (Jack Monroe)
- Issue 136: Snowbird
- Issue 137: Wasp
- Issue 138: Batroc the Leaper
- Issue 139: Scarlet Spider
- Issue 140: Beta Ray Bill
- Issue 141: Pyro
- Issue 142: Silver Sable
- Issue 143: Radioactive Man
- Issue 144: Typhoid Mary
- Issue 145: Marvel Girl
- Issue 146: Quasar
- Issue 147: Prowler
- Issue 148: Firestar
- Issue 149: Cannonball
- Issue 150: Triton
- Issue 151: Ares
- Issue 152: Destiny
- Issue 153: Balder
- Issue 154: Wrecker
- Issue 155: Songbird
- Issue 156: Toad
- Issue 157: Moondragon
- Issue 158: Spiral
- Issue 159: Siryn
- Issue 160: Blackheart
- Issue 161: Puppet Master
- Issue 162: Karnak
- Issue 163: Hydro-Man
- Issue 164: Captain Marvel (Mar-Vell)
- Issue 165: Spectrum
- Issue 166: Magik
- Issue 167: Beetle
- Issue 168: Shanna the She-Devil
- Issue 169: Forge
- Issue 170: Wizard
- Issue 171: Thunderbird
- Issue 172: Dracula
- Issue 173: Avalanche
- Issue 174: Arachne
- Issue 175: Mockingbird
- Issue 176: Tiger Shark
- Issue 177: Nico Minoru
- Issue 178: Domino
- Issue 179: Sif
- Issue 180: J. Jonah Jameson
- Issue 181: Sebastian Shaw
- Issue 182: Swordsman
- Issue 183: Owl
- Issue 184: Hammerhead
- Issue 185: Longshot
- Issue 186: Trapster
- Issue 187: Shaman
- Issue 188: Werewolf by Night
- Issue 189: Gamora
- Issue 190: Vance Astro
- Issue 191: Constrictor
- Issue 192: Wolfsbane
- Issue 193: Stingray
- Issue 194: Moonstone
- Issue 195: Danielle Moonstar
- Issue 196: Firelord
- Issue 197: Spider-Man 2099
- Issue 198: Wiccan
- Issue 199: Deathbird
- Issue 200: Hela

=== Alternative release order ===
In some areas issues 5–14 saw the figures released in a different order.

- Issue 5: Storm
- Issue 6: Iron Man
- Issue 7: Green Goblin
- Issue 8: Daredevil
- Issue 9: Doctor Doom
- Issue 10: Blade
- Issue 11: Captain America
- Issue 12: Silver Surfer
- Issue 13: Magneto
- Issue 14: Jean Grey

=== Variants in the collection ===
- Issue 11: Jean Grey in red Phoenix costume (Note: This was an exclusive only available to subscribers and through Forbidden Planet.)
- Issue 31: Angel in blue-and-white costume with blue face
- Issue 46: Captain Marvel (Note: Exclusive to Diamond Comic Distributors customers. Titled the "Previews Exclusive Variant" or "PX Variant".)
- Issue 71: Quicksilver Green Costume (Note: Exclusive in France.)
- Special Issue 1: The Incredible Hulk – Grey Hulk

== Specials ==
- Subscriber Exclusive: Red Costume Spider-Man
- Issue 1: The Incredible Hulk – variant available; see above
- Issue 2: Juggernaut
- Issue 3: Colossus
- Issue 4: Thanos
- Issue 5: Black Costume Spider-Man
- Issue 6: Apocalypse
- Issue 7: Rhino
- Issue 8: Iron Man (1st Appearance Movie Version)
- Issue 9: Abomination
- Issue 10: Man-Thing
- Issue 11: Kingpin
- Issue 12: Destroyer (70th Anniversary Special)
- Issue 13: Cloak and Dagger
- Issue 14: Ronan the Accuser
- Issue 15: Omega Red
- Issue 16: Sauron
- Issue 17: Odin
- Issue 18: Terrax
- Issue 19: Giant-Man (Hank Pym)
- Issue 20: Executioner

== Mega-Specials ==
- Issue 1: Galactus
- Issue 2: Sentinel
- Issue 3: Watcher
- Issue 4: Fin Fang Foom
- Issue 5: Blob
- Issue 6: MODOK
- Issue 7: Mojo

== Double Packs ==
- Issue 1: Professor X and Lilandra Neramani
- Issue 2: Ka-Zar and Zabu
- Issue 3: Sasquatch and Puck
- Issue 4: Northstar and Aurora

== Awards ==
The Classic Marvel Figurine Collection won the "Magazine of the Year" award in the Diamond Gem Awards 2007.

== Credits ==
Editors in order of stewardship: Alan Cowsill, Richard Jackson, John Tomlinson, Sven Wilson

Art Editors: Dan Rachael, Gary Gilbert, Colin Willams

== See also ==
- DC Comics Super Hero Collection
- Marvel Fact Files
