= Annihilators (Marvel Comics) =

Fictional comic book team

- Cover of Annihilators 1 (May 2011); Featuring (from bottom right clockwise) Silver Surfer, Ronan the Accuser, Quasar, Beta Ray Bill and Gladiator, art by Alex Garner

Group publication information
- Publisher: Marvel Comics
- First appearance: The Thanos Imperative: Devastation (Jan 2011)
- Created by: Dan Abnett; Andy Lanning; Miguel Angel Sepulveda

In-story information
- Member(s): Quasar; Silver Surfer; Ronan the Accuser; Beta Ray Bill; Gladiator; Ikon (Spaceknight); Cosmo

Annihilators
- Format: Limited series
- Genre: Science fiction, superhero
- Publication date: (Annihilators); March – June 2011 (Annihilators: Earthfall); September – December 2011

Creative team
- Writer(s): Dan Abnett; Andy Lanning
- Penciller(s): Annihilators; Tan Eng Huat
- Inker(s): Annihilators; Victor Olazaba
- Creator(s): Dan Abnett; Andy Lanning; Miguel Angel Sepulveda

Collected editions
- Volume 1: ISBN 978-0-7851-6040-3
- Volume 2: ISBN 0785159045

The Annihilators are a fictional team appearing in American comic books published by Marvel Comics. They are a group of powerful space-based characters from various alien races. They act as a deterrent to galactic war.

== Publication history ==
The team first assembled in The Thanos Imperative: Devastation one-shot (Jan 2011). They starred in a four-issue eponymous limited series, with a backup featuring Groot and Rocket Raccoon, which was previously announced as a separate limited series.

A second four-issue limited series, Annihilators: Earthfall, ran from September to December 2011.

In August 2014, the team appeared in the original graphic novel Thanos: The Infinity Revelation by Jim Starlin.

== Fictional team history ==
After a string of galactic-level threats (the Annihilation Wave, the Phalanx's conquest of the Kree, the War of Kings, and the Cancerverse invasion), Cosmo tries to fulfill the dream of his deceased friend and former Guardian of the Galaxy Star-Lord by assembling a proactive team to stop threats before the universe is in danger. He recruits the most powerful individuals he knows: the human Quasar, the Kree Ronan the Accuser, the Shi'ar Gladiator, the Korbinite Beta Ray Bill, and Herald of Galactus Silver Surfer. Each of them is initially resistant to the idea, but agree to join after they work together to defend Kree territory from Blastaar.

They are joined by the Galadorian Spaceknight Ikon, who needs their assistance protecting her planet from Doctor Dredd. After fending off Dire Wraiths and Immortus, they ultimately reveal Doctor Dredd to be a Skrull imposter.

Later, while trying to end a conflict between two factions of the Universal Church of Truth, the Annihilators learn of a plot to revive the Magus. They travel to Earth where the resurrection is happening but are unable to prevent it due to a conflict with the Avengers, who mistake the Annihilators for an invasion force. Quasar, Ikon, and Spider-Man discover the Magus has emerged from his cocoon in the form of a young boy. The Magus attempts to possess other humans on Earth, but Gladiator, Quasar, Ronan, and Iron Man are able to trick him back into his cocoon. The Annihilators take custody of the cocoon.

== Collected editions ==
Annihilators has been collected in:

Title	Material collected	ISBN
Annihilators	Annihilators #1–4	0-7851-6040-X
Annihilators: Earthfall	Annihilators: Earthfall #1–4	0-7851-5904-5
Guardians of the Galaxy by Abnett & Lanning Omnibus	Guardians of the Galaxy (vol. 2) #1–25; Thanos Imperative: Ignition #1; Thanos Imperative #1–6; Thanos Imperative: Devastation #1; material from Annihilators #1–4 and Annihilators: Earthfall #1–4	978-0-7851-9834-5
War of Kings Aftermath: Realm of Kings	Realm of Kings #1; Realm of Kings: Inhumans #1–5; Realm of Kings: Imperial Guard #1–5; Realm of Kings: Son of Hulk #1–4; Nova (2007) #29–36; Guardians of the Galaxy (2008) #20–25; Thanos Imperative #1–6, Ignition, Devastation and Annihilators #1–4; Annihilators: Earthfall #1–4; Thanos Sourcebook; material from I Am an Avenger #3	978-1-302-90447-0

== In other media ==
The Annihilators are featured as a playable team in Marvel Strike Force, consisting of Silver Surfer, Thanos (Endgame), Ultimus, Gladiator, and Gorr the God Butcher.
