= Shane White =

American cartoonist (born 1970)

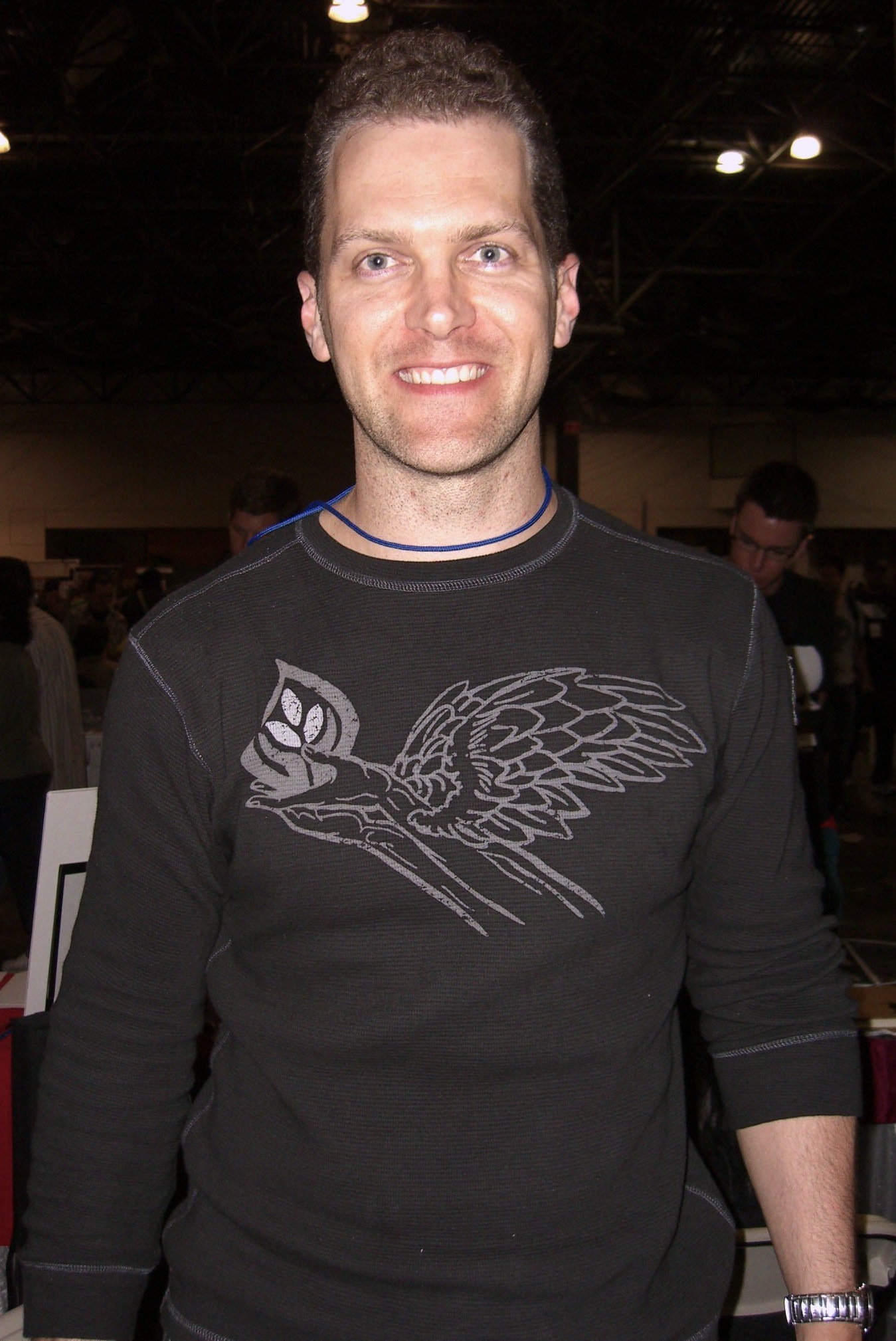
- White at the New York Comic Con in Manhattan, October 9, 2010.
- Born: August 24, 1970 (age 56) Alexandria, Louisiana
- Area: Comic book creator
- Notable works: North Country

Shane White (born 1970) is an American illustrator, comic book writer and artist and author from Massena, New York.

== Career ==
=== Comics ===
Shane White's earliest comic work appeared in small-press comics in the mid-1980s. His first professional penciling work was for Silverwolf Comics' (Greater Mercury Comics) Eradicators in 1990. Several years later he did work for DC/Paradox's Big Book of Urban Legends. In 1998 Caliber Comics hired him along with Martin Powell to adapt Whitley Strieber's Communion book, of which two of the four issues were ultimately finished.

His first graphic novel, North Country, a 96-page full-color memoir published by NBM Publishing, focuses on the hard-scrabble life of living in a blue-collar mill town in upstate New York. In his second graphic novel, Things Undone, a videogame artist struggles with falling out of love with his girlfriend, his job and life, turning him into a zombie. BRAUN, his third graphic novel, is about Maven, a girl and her highly advanced robot protector.

== Illustration and writing ==
White's other notable works as an illustrator, storyboard artist, concept artist and comic book writer and artist include:

- Illustrator: Munchkin: Pathfinder Artist Edition 2017 Steve Jackson Games
- Writer: Amazon Rapids Text-based stories for kids 2016 Amazon
- Illustrator: Lord of the Rings: War of the North 2014 Warner Bros. Interactive
- Storyboard & Concept Artist: Star Wars Kinect 2011 Microsoft Games
- Artist: Tori Amos Comic Book Tattoo Anthology 2008 Image Comics 11-page story written by Jessica Staley inspired by the song "Devils & Gods".
- Co-Creator/Artist: The Overman Books I-V 2008 Image Comics written by Scott Reed
- Illustrator: Cryptic Science: The Big Squirm by Kevin J. Anderson and Rebecca Moesta 2007 Adventure Boys Inc.
- Illustrator: Cryptic Science: The Secret of Groom Lake by S. Arthur Hart 2007 Adventure Boys Inc.
- Illustrator: Blue Squadron: Big Splash by Loren L. Coleman 2007 Adventure Boys Inc.
- Illustrator: Blue Squadron: The Shores of Tripoli by Loren L. Coleman 2007 Adventure Boys Inc.
- Story Writer: Negative Burn #7 2006 Desperado Publishing Volstagg: Barbarian Cop
- Story Artist/Adapter: Negative Burn #2 2006 Desperado Publishing Bog Man (adapted from Jessica Staley's 10 minute play)
- Writer & Artist: Fear Agent: Eye of Chaos Issue #7 2006 Image Comics 8-page back-up story

== Bibliography ==
- White, Shane. BRAUN 2017 Studiowhite Productions. ISBN 0998379360
- White, Shane. Things Undone 2009 NBM Publishing. ISBN 1-56163-563-4
- White, Shane. North Country 2005 NBM Publishing. ISBN 1-56163-435-2
