= Marvel Fact Files =

The Marvel Fact Files are a series of encyclopedic guides which detail the fictional universe featured in Marvel Comics publications. The magazine series is published in the UK by Eaglemoss Publications starting in 2013.

The magazines are published in a similar way to the Master Edition of the Official Handbook of the Marvel Universe: Each issue is a shrink-wrapped pack of double-sided loose-leaf pages (only glued together for transport). A three-ring vinyl binder was also released for the pages to be inserted into and is regularly distributed with the magazine.

Subscribers receive three other pieces of memorabilia and also special issues throughout the year with extra figures like the mega-specials of The Classic Marvel Figurine Collection. The online service, based in the UK, prohibits the items to be sold directly to American buyers, however the magazines can be obtained through several comic book speciality stores in the United States and in Europe. The collection was announced to be ending with issue 100 at first but was prolonged to issue 150 in 2015 and to issue 200 in 2016. Eaglemoss have added 50 more issue for 2017, taking the issue total to 250 and making it the most comprehensive Encyclopedia of Marvel with 7500 pages.

The Marvel Fact Files where translated into Italian and Spanish, the latter received a 70 issues hard cover edition, while the Italian version counted 150 issues. In Brazil, only the specials that featured figurines were published.

== Bibliography ==
- Original Series #1 - #250 (Eaglemoss Publications, 2013 - 2016)

² double-sheet / ³ triple-sheet

#	Info	Publ. Date	Sheets	Orig. Price
1	Overview: 1960s Avengers, Spider-Man variant costumes, X-Men's 1st & 2nd team Heroes: Elektra's assassin abilities, Red Hulk, Silver Fox, Weapon X, Wolverine, Wolverine's mutant powers² Villains: Lizard / Locations: Baxter Building² / Tech: Infinity Gauntlet / Real Marvel: Fantastic Four's 1st appearance (includes folder)	21 Mar 2013	13	£0.99
2	Overview: 1970s Avengers, Spider-Man, Spider-Man's genetics², Gwen Stacy, Skrulls, Symbiote, X-Men's 3rd team & New Mutants; Heroes: Rogue's mutant powers, Winter Soldier, Wolverine's variant costumes Villains: Dormammu / Locations: - / Tech: Avengers Quinjet² / Real Marvel: Stan Lee	28 Mar 2013	13	£2.99
3	Overview: 1980s Avengers, X-Men's 4th team, Marvel Zombies; Heroes: Daredevil, Iron Man, Iron Man Mark XXV, Stark's Business, Thor's hammer Mjolnir, X-23; Villains: The Hand, Sinister Six / Locations: Latveria / Tech: - / Real Marvel: Hulk's Evolution (includes 7 separators)	4 Apr 2013	13	£2.99
4	Overview: 1990s Avengers, Fantastic Four, Spider-Man and the Avengers, X-Men's 5th team & Excalibur; Heroes: Black Widow, Daredevil's hero powers, Planet Hulk, Thing, Thing's mutations, Villains: Lady Deathstrike, Symbiotes / Locations: X-Mansion³ / Tech: Eye of Agamotto / Real Marvel: Death of Jean Grey	11 Apr 2013	13	£2.99
5	A1-AT-05, A2-CP-01, A2-CP-02, A2-CP-03, A2-HK-02, X1-XR-05, X3-HF-01, X3-SA-01, X3-SE-01, F5-FC-02, S1-SM-07, C3-AN-01, R2-AK-01	18 Apr 2013	13	£2.99
6	A2-NF-01, A2-TH-03, A3-DS-01, A3-VI-01, A4-AS-01, A5-SH-01, X1-XR-06, X2-QQ-01, F1-FT-01, S3-VE-01, K2-GR-02, C1-KR-01, R2-JK-01	25 Apr 2013	13	£2.99
7	A2-MH-01, A3-UL-01, X1-XR-07, X2-ST-01, X3-MA-01, X5-BB-01, F1-FN-01, F1-FT-02, F2-MR-02, K2-PU-01, C4-AP-01, C5-CC-01, R4-CS-01	2 May 2013	13	£2.99
8	A2-HA-02, A2-HK-01, A2-SH-02, A3-AB-01, X1-XR-08, X2-WV-15, F1-FT-03, F2-IW-01, S4-GL-01, K2-DD-03, C2-ET-01, R2-CC-01, R3-ES-01	9 May 2013	13	£2.99
9	A2-BW-02, A3-BL-01, A3-MO-01, X1-XR-09, X2-AL-01, X2-WV-16, F1-FT-01, F2-MR-01, S3-GR-01, S3-GR-05, K2-PU-05, K5-PV-01, R2-ES-02	16 May 2013	13	£2.99
10	A2-HA-01, X1-XR-10, X2-CB-01, X2-WV-17, F1-FT-05, F3-DO-01, F3-DO-02, S3-CA-02, K2-HE-01, K3-ME-01, C2-SI-01, C4-NZ-01, R4-CA-01	23 May 2013	13	£2.99
11	A2-HE-01, A2-HK-04, A3-LE-01, A4-AM-01, X1-XR-11, X2-EF-01, F2-IW-02, S1-ST-01, S2-SC-01, K2-MK-02, C2-GG-02, C4-TW-01, R2-PD-01	30 May 2013	13	£2.99
12	A2-HP-04, A4-AM-02, X1-XR-12, X3-DA-01, F2-HT-02, F2-TI-03, S1-ST-02, S2-JJ-03, K2-PU-02, K3-JS-01, C3-GA-01, C3-TE-01, R4-CX-02	6 Jun 2013	13	£2.99
13	A2-WA-01, X1-XR-13, X2-CY-01, X2-CY-02, X2-CY-03, F3-FR-01, S1-ST-03, S2-BC-01, S3-DO-01, K2-HO-01, K2-WE-01, C1-WA-01, R2-JR-01	13 Jun 2013	13	£2.99
14	A2-WM-01, A2-WM-02, X1-XR-14, X2-EF-02, X3-BA-01, F2-HT-01, F4-SU-01, S1-ST-04, S2-SL-01, K3-KP-02, C2-GG-01, R2-JL-01, R4-CS-02	20 Jun 2013	13	£2.99
-	Wolverine Special (includes figurine)	20 Jun 2013	20 pages	£12.99
15	A2-CP-04, A4-AM-03, A5-FR-01, X1-XR-15, F3-SP-01, S1-SM-08, S1-ST-05, K2-BL-01, K2-DD-04, K3-KP-01, C5-MC-01, R2-JQ-01, R4-CH-01	27 Jun 2013	13	£2.99
16	X1-XR-16, X2-DP-01, X2-WV-20, F2-IN-01, F3-WI-01, S5-WE-01, K2-CL-01, K2-DS-01, K4-SA-01, C2-BR-01, C4-NZ-01, R2-MW-01, R4-EF-01	4 Jul 2013	13	£2.99
17	A3-KA-01, X1-XR-17, X2-NI-02, X4-WD-01, F2-FV-01, F3-IM-01, S3-MY-01, K2-DE-01, K2-DE-02, K2-EL-01, C2-SI-01, C2-SI-02, R4-CF-02	11 Jul 2013	13	£2.99
18	A2-IM-04, A2-SH-01, A2-TH-04, A4-OL-01, X1-XR-18, X2-CB-02, F3-RG-01, S2-JJ-01, S3-SY-01, K2-HE-02, K3-TM-01, C3-TH-02, R4-CN-01	18 Jul 2013	13	£2.99
19	A2-HA-03, A3-HL-01, A3-KA-02, A5-HS-01, X1-XR-19, X3-DB-01, F2-BP-01, F2-HAT-0, F4-WA-01, S1-SM-09, K3-BL-01, C1-PH-01, R2-FM-01 (includes folder)	25 Jul 2013	13	£2.99
20	A2-HK-05, A3-AI-01, X1-XR-20, X2-WV-11, X3-SE-02, F2-IW-03, F2-NV-01, S2-KA-01, S3-HO-01, K3-BE-01, C2-RR-01, C5-NB-01, R4-CU-01	1 Aug 2013	13	£2.99
21	A2-TH-01, A3-LO-01, A4-RB-01, X1-XR-21, X2-KP-01, F2-TI-04, F4-FP-01, S2-BC-02, K2-MY-01, K3-BU-01, K3-DR-01, C2-DE-01, R2-SD-01	8 Aug 2013	13	£2.99
22	A2-CD-01, A2-CD-02, X1-XR-22, X3-JU-01, F2-TH-01, F2-TH-02, F3-KL-01, S1-SM-10, S4-DB-01, K2-CH-01, C1-CG-01, C3-RO-02, R4-CS-02	15 Aug 2013	13	£2.99
23	A2-CP-05, A2-FS-01, A3-SM-01, X1-XR-23, X2-AU-01, X2-KP-02, F2-MR-04, F3-PM-01, S2-PR-01, K2-MC-01, K2-MC-02, C2-AW-01, R2-GM-01	22 Aug 2013	13	£2.99
24	A2-IM-05, A2-MO-01, X1-XR-24, X1-XT-01, F3-AS-01, F3-DO-03, S2-JO-01, S3-KR-02, K2-BL-02, C2-SJ-01, C4-MV-01, C5-SM-01, R4-CI-01	29 Aug 2013	13	£2.99
-	Doctor Doom Special (includes figurine)	29 Aug 2013	20 pages	£15.99
25	A2-HK-07, A3-AG-01, X1-XR-25, X1-XT-02, X2-WV-10, X3-MP-02, F3-MM-01, S2-MJ-01, S3-GG-03, K2-MK-01, K5-MH-01, C1-HG-01, R4-SW-01	5 Sep 2013	13	£2.99
26	A2-LS-01, A3-CR-01, X1-XR-26, X1-XT-03, X2-ST-03, F2-LJ-01, S2-FT-01, S3-CA-03, S5-SL-01, K2-IF-01, K2-NW-01, C2-TN-01, R2-NA-01	12 Sep 2013	13	£2.99
27	A2-RE-01, A4-RA-01, X1-XR-27, X1-XT-04, X3-DH-01, F2-HT-05, F3-PU-01, S3-RH-01, S3-VE-03, S5-GL-01, K2-DD-05, C3-HE-01, R4-CW-01	19 Sep 2013	13	£2.99
28	A1-AR-01, A3-TA-01, X1-XT-05, X2-WV-29, X3-MG-01, F2-TI-05, F4-CD-01, S1-SM-11, S2-MW-01, K1-MA-01, K3-BH-01, C1-BR-01, R2-WS-01	26 Sep 2013	13	£2.99
29	A1-AR-02, A2-FA-01, X3-AP-02, X4-GN-01, F2-AH-01, F2-NA-01, S2-HR-02, S3-EL-01, K2-SG-01, C2-NV-01, C5-SI-01, R2-BS-01, R3-EC-01	3 Oct 2013	13	£2.99
30	A1-AR-03, A2-IM-07, X2-PX-01, X3-SA-02, F2-HB-01, F2-TR-01, S3-BE-01, K2-PU-04, K4-HK-01, C1-CE-01, C2-BY-01, C5-SG-01, R4-CD-01	10 Oct 2013	13	£2.99
31	A1-AR-04, A2-AH-01, X3-MG-02, X3-MJ-01, F2-BB-01, F2-MR-05, S2-AU-02, S3-SO-01, K2-MT-01, K3-DR-02, C2-AW-02, C3-MM-01, R2-BE-01	17 Oct 2013	13	£2.99
32	A1-AR-05, A2-HP-01, A3-IA-01, X2-BE-03, X3-AA-01, X3-TO-01, F2-ME-01, S2-SL-02, K2-CD-01, K2-DF-03, K5-BO-01, C3-GA-02, R2-MM-01	24 Oct 2013	13	£2.99
33	A1-AR-06, A2-SW-01, A5-VB-01, X2-EF-03, X2-HA-01, F2-TI-07, F2-TO-01, S3-HA-01, S4-HL-01, K2-BR-02, K2-FA-01, C3-BL-01, R1-NU-01	31 Oct 2013	13	£2.99
34	A1-AR-07, A3-RM-01, X2-FO-02, X3-MG-03, X4-DR-01, F2-IW-04, F3-LE-01, S1-SM-12, S2-MO-01, K2-DS-02, K2-ST-01, C3-MA-01, R4-CX-03	7 Nov 2013	13	£2.99
-	Thor Special (includes figurine)	7 Nov 2013	20 pages	£15.99
35	A1-AR-08, A3-UL-02, X2-SC-01, X3-ON-01, F2-TI-06, F3-DI-01, F3-MX-01, S2-SC-02, S3-WR-01, K2-LC-05, C2-VA-02, C3-LI-01, R2-EB-01	14 Nov 2013	13	£2.99
36	A1-AR-09, A1-KS-01, A4-PL-01, X2-AN-01, X3-LM-01, F2-MR-03, F3-OV-01, S2-JJ-02, S2-SB-01, S5-TG-01, K2-DD-06, C3-CO-01, R4-JJ-01	21 Nov 2013	13	£2.99
37	A1-AR-10, A2-CM-01, X2-EX-01, X3-CX-01, F2-AM-01, F5-UN-01, S2-AU-01, S3-HO-02, K-GR-03, C2-EO-01, C4-EX-01, R1-MU-01, R4-CW-01 (includes folder)	28 Nov 2013	13	£2.99
38	A1-AR-11, A2-HK-08, A2-HP-02, A2-VI-01, X2-JG-01, X3-NR-01, F4-LI-01, S1-SM-13, S3-KR-01, K2-EC-01, C1-SH-01, C2-TH-03, R2-MF-01	5 Dec 2013	13	£2.99
39	A1-AR-12, A2-HC-01, X2-BL-01, X4-KR-01, F2-IW-05, F3-QU-01, S2-SW-02, K2-LC-01, K3-BU-02, C2-GR-01, C5-GS-01, R2-TM-01, R3-ED-01	12 Dec 2013	13	£2.99
40	A1-AR-13, A4-AS-02, A4-MD-01, X2-DZ-01, X4-MW-01, F2-CR-01, F3-AT-01, S1-SM-14, S2-MO-02, K2-DL-01, C2-PI-01, C4-FI-01, R2-PS-01	19 Dec 2013	13	£2.99
41	A1-AR-14, A2-CM-02, A3-TG-01, X2-FO-01, X3-GC-01, F2-KN-01, F4-AL-01, S2-JO-02, S3-EL-02, K3-ST-01, K5-ST-02, C3-AN-03, R4-CM-01	2 Jan 2014	13	£2.99
42	A1-AR-15, A2-CP-06, A3-EN-01, X2-AN-02, X3-BO-01, F3-DO-04, F5-AJ-01, S2-RA-01, S3-CI-01, K2-UB-01, C3-EG-01, C3-TH-04, R5-CX-04	9 Jan 2014	13	£2.99
43	A1-AR-16, A3-WR-02, X2-NI-01, X3-OR-02, X4-MV-01, F2-TI-08, F5-PO-01, S2-RO-01, S3-SN-02, K2-KA-01, K2-SH-01, C5-CO-01, R2-JB-01	16 Jan 2014	13	£2.99
44	A1-AR-17, A2-DO-01, A2-HP-03, A5-MZ-01, X1-XT-06, X2-DN-01, F2-GG-01, F3-DM-01, S2-CR-01, S3-GR-02, K2-IF-02, C3-TH-05, R2-JS-01	23 Jan 2014	13	£2.99
45	A1-AR-18, A2-OD-01, A2-QS-01, X2-DO-01, F2-UA-01, F3-AR-01, S2-EZ-01, S3-HM-01, K2-BR-01, K3-GL-01, C4-DW-01, C4-MO-01, R2-JS-01	30 Jan 2014	13	£2.99
46	A1-AR-19, A2-IN-01, A2-JO-01, X2-JG-02, X3-MS-02, F2-NB-01, F3-MA-01, F5-WW-01, S2-HS-01, S3-BU-01, K2-HC-01, K3-SH-01, R4-CI-02	6 Feb 2014	13	£2.99
47	A1-AR-20, A2-MD-01, A2-WA-01, X2-BE-01, X2-EX-02, X3-SB-01, F2-LY-01, F3-DO-08, F5-BR-01, S2-MJ-02, S3-SA-01, C3-GA-03, R2-RT-01	13 Feb 2014	13	£2.99
48	A1-AR-21, A2-LC-02, A2-TH-05, A5-IA-02, X2-CO-01, X2-PS-01, F2-HT-04, F2-PP-01, S1-SM-15, S2-NW-01, K2-DD-07, C2-QU-01, R4-CS-03	20 Feb 2014	13	£2.99
49	A1-AR-36, A3-HE-02, A3-LO-02, A5-DE-01, X3-MG-04, X3-SN-01, F3-DO-09, S3-MO-01, S3-VU-01, K3-BA-01, K3-NU-01, C3-TH-01, R4-CJ-01	27 Feb 2014	13	£2.99
50	A1-AR-22, A2-JO-02, A2-QU-02, X2-WO-18, X3-MT-01, X4-SV-01, F2-CU-01, S2-BC-03, S3-TR-01, K2-NM-01, K5-MW-01, C2-FI-01, R2-MG-01	6 Mar 2014	13	£2.99
51	A1-AR-23, A2-SW-02, A5-BW-01, X2-BI-01, X2-MA-01, F2-DC-01, F3-DO-09, S3-PU-01, S3-TE-01, K2-BL-05, C2-SL-01, R1-HU-01, R2-SB-01	13 Mar 2014	13	£2.99
52	A1-AR-24, A2-AN-01, A2-QU-03, A4-PL-02, X2-LS-01, X4-MU-01, F3-SH-01, S3-HB-01, S4-MH-01, K3-OW-01, C2-BR-02, C2-GM-01, R2-JH-01	20 Mar 2014	13	£2.99
53	A1-AR-25, A2-SH-03, A5-SL-01, X2-SA-01, X2-YX-01, F2-NR-01, F3-DA-01, S3-LL-01, S3-TO-01, K4-NR-01, C2-GL-01, C2-IK-01, R4-CT-01	27 Mar 2014	13	£2.99
54	A1-AR-26, A2-PP-01, A3-IR-01, X2-JG-03, X3-MS-03, F3-BR-01, F3-NG-01, S1-SM-16, S2-OO-01, K2-DS-03, K3-OW-02, C3-TA-01, R4-CD-02	3 Apr 2014	13	£2.99
55	A1-AR-27, A2-BW-03, A3-AE-01, X2-MY-01, X3-OR-01, F2-ST-01, F3-SE-01, S3-CH-01, K2-DD-08, K2-DH-01, C1-TE-01, C3-DE-01, R2-JA-01	10 Apr 2014	13	£2.99
-	Captain America Special (includes figurine)	10 Apr 2014	20 pages	£12.99
56	A1-AR-28, A2-EG-01, A3-HO-02, A5-FL-01, A5-SC-01, X2-XS-01, X3-BS-01, F1-FF-02, S2-FM-01, S3-SW-01, K2-EB-01, C1-SN-01, R2-JW-01	17 Apr 2014	13	£2.99
57	A1-AR-29, A2-BA-01, A3-MG-01, X2-HO-01, X3-MG-05, F3-AX-01, F5-NZ-01, S1-SM-17, S3-FO-01, K2-BL-03, C2-DR-01, R1-MA-01, R4-CG-01	24 Apr 2014	13	£2.99
58	A1-AR-30, A2-VI-02, A3-CB-01, A5-SA-01, X2-CO-02, X3-SU-01, F1-FF-03, S2-JP-01, S3-MW-01, K2-SS-01, C1-CE-02, C3-CH-01, R4-CP-01	1 May 2014	13	£2.99
59	A1-AR-31, A2-CA-07, A3-HY-01, A4-HB-01, X2-BA-01, X2-WC-01, F2-HT-06, S2-BA-01, K2-DD-09, K2-MG-01, K2-SZ-01, C2-AW-03, R2-HT-01	8 May 2014	13	£2.99
60	A1-AR-32, A2-DD-01, A5-IB-01, X2-DP-02, X2-SG-01, X3-RE-01, F3-AH-01, S1-SM-18, S2-NW-02, K2-GA-01, K3-BU-03, C2-PV-01, R2-GC-01	15 May 2014	13	£2.99
61	A1-AR-33, A2-ST-01, A3-HM-01, A4-CH-01, A5-KT-01, X2-SA-01, X3-TF-01, F2-TI-09, F3-MT-01, S2-GS-01, K2-GR-03, C2-LT-01, R2-GE-01	22 May 2014	13	£2.99
62	A1-AR-34, A2-IM-08, A2-MR-01, X2-CO-03, X3-PU-01, X5-PW-01, F3-HS-01, S3-CR-01, S3-TI-01, S4-PP-01, K2-KA-02, C3-GM-01, R4-HA-01	29 May 2014	13	£2.99
63	A1-AR-35, A2-BK-01, X2-GA-01, X3-MS-01, F2-MR-06, S3-MY-02, S3-SP-01, S5-IS-01, K2-AO-01, K2-DD-10, C1-CO-01, C2-CU-01, R4-CC-01	5 Jun 2014	13	£2.99
64	A1-AR-37, A1-AV-02, A4-PP-01, X2-CN-01, X3-CH-01, F2-TI-10, F3-MO-01, S2-HR-03, S3-TA-01, K2-GR-04, K3-TM-02, C2-MA-01, R4-EX-01	12 Jun 2014	13	£2.99
65	A1-AR-38, A2-CP-08, A3-HM-01, A5-TM-01, X2-HA-02, X3-MP-01, F3-RW-01, S3-SI-01, S3-VE-04, K2-JK-01, K3-KP-03, C2-EP-01, R2-DS-01	19 Jun 2014	13	£2.99
66	A1-AR-39, A1-AS-01, A3-HO-01, X2-CY-04, X3-CB-01, F2-WW-01, S2-MO-03, S4-FH-01, K2-IF-03, K3-NG-01, C1-DI-01, C2-ST-01, R1-GN-01	26 Jun 2014	13	£2.99
67	A1-AR-40, A1-AS-02, A2-MA-01, A2-WT-01, X2-SI-01, X2-ST-02, X2-XT-02, F1-FF-04, S3-VB-01, S4-AI-01, K2-WT-01, C3-AN-02, R4-CA-02	3 Jul 2014	13	£2.99
-	Magneto Special (includes figurine)	3 Jul 2014	20 pages	£15.99
68	A2-WO-01, A3-UL-03, X2-DW-01, X4-AM-01, F1-FR-01, F2-OC-01, S2-SC-03, S3-SK-01, K2-DS-04, K4-BN-01, C1-SP-01, C3-RO-01, R4-CH-02	10 Jul 2014	13	£2.99
69	A1-IN-01, A2-WS-02, A3-RS-01, X2-PO-01, X3-SY-01, F1-FR-02, F2-NA-02, F5-FC-01, S2-GS-02, S3-JA-02, K2-LI-01, C3-AN-04, R4-CS-04	17 Jul 2014	13	£2.99
70	A2-WO-02, A3-RS-02, X2-MX-01, X3-VU-01, F1-FR-03, F3-CC-01, S2-NW-03, S5-GA-01, K2-WH-01, C2-DA-01, C2-GA-01, R1-KF-01, R3-ET-01	24 Jul 2014	13	£2.99
71	A2-JJ-01, A2-SK-01, X2-ST-04, X2-WO-01, X3-BR-01, F1-FR-04, F3-MI-01, S3-GG-01, S3-SE-01, S5-BE-01, K2-NI-01, C3-GA-04, R2-DH-01	31 Jul 2014	13	£2.99
72	A2-RG-01, A2-SQ-01, A3-EG-01, X2-BO-01, X3-AP-03, F1-FR-05, F2-WL-01, S3-DO-02, K2-MI-01, K3-MF-01, C2-SI-03, C5-KS-01, R3-EG-01	7 Aug 2014	13	£2.99
73	A2-FW-01, A3-AZ-01, X2-CY-05, X3-MR-01, F1-FR-06, F3-PA-01, S1-SM-19, S2-NT-01, S5-SI-01, K3-LB-01, C2-SE-01, C5-DH-01, R3-EI-01 (includes folder)	14 Aug 2014	13	£2.99
74	A2-JU-01, A3-ZC-01, A4-AV-01, X1-XX-03, X3-KH-01, F1-FR-07, S3-GR-06, K2-DF-02, K2-SL-01, K3-RU-01, C3-GA-05, C5-MM-01, R4-CX-05	21 Aug 2014	13	£2.99
75	A1-AF-01, A3-YC-01, A5-BK-01, X2-JB-01, X3-SR-01, F1-FR-08, S2-FT-02, S2-LI-02, K2-EL-03, K3-PR-01, C2-VA-01, C3-FF-01, R3-EI-02	28 Aug 2014	13	£2.99
76	A2-SE-01, A3-BD-01, A4-AT-01, X2-LS-02, X3-FF-01, F1-FR-09, F3-EC-01, S2-SR-01, S3-MS-01, K2-DS-05, K3-MO-01, C2-GG-04, R4-CS-05	4 Sep 2014	13	£2.99
77	A2-SC-01, A3-WR-01, X2-WV-21, X3-SL-01, X5-MJ-01, F1-FR-10, F3-MH-01, S1-SM-20, S3-SR-01, K2-CO-01, K2-GR-05, C3-FI-01, R4-CW-03	11 Sep 2014	13	£2.99
78	A2-CP-09, A3-BS-01, X2-MX-02, X2-WV-24, F1-FR-11, F4-WF-01, S3-SD-01, S3-TH-01, K2-DF-04, K5-PA-01, C1-MK-01, C3-IB-01, R4-MR-01	18 Sept 2014	13	£2.99
79	A3-BT-01, X2-BH-01, X2-JB-02, X2-XA-01, F1-FR-12, F2-MR-07, S3-BO-01, S3-MR-01, K3-BC-01, K3-SC-01, K4-DB-01, C4-AA-01, R2-JK-02	25 Sep 2014	13	£2.99
-	Deadpool Special (includes figurine)	25 Sep 2014	20	£15.99
80	A2-BM-01, A3-LO-03, A5-RR-01, X2-AN-03, X2-MJ-01, F1-FR-13, F3-AA-01, S2-OU-01, S3-HY-01, K2-DD-11, C2-IW-01, C2-QU-02, R4-MZ-01	2 Okt 2014	13	£2.99
81	A2-JA-01, A2-RH-02, A3-GR-01, X3-LD-02, X4-SA-01, F1-FR-14, FF-MM-02, S1-SM-21, S3-GH-01, K3-LL-01, C2-SI-05, C4-DF-01, R4-CE-01	9 Okt 2014	13	£2.99
82	A1-AV-01, A3-MI-01, X2-IC-02, X2-WV-19, F1-FR-15, F2-AQ-01, S3-HO-03, S3-TL-01, K2-BK-01, K2-HE-03, K5-ID-01, C2-RR-02, R1-HC-01	16 Okt 2014	13	£2.99
83	A2-AA-01, A3-SN-01, A5-DR-01, X2-LE-01, X2-WV-22, F1-FR-16, F3-TE-01, S1-SM-22, S2-FT-03, K1-SH-01, K2-BL-04, C4-DF-01, R4-CX-06	23 Okt 2014	13	£2.99
84	A2-DU-01, A3-SG-01, X2-NO-01, X3-LI-01, F1-FR-17, F3-TL-01, S1-SM-23, S3-SU-01, K4-FT-01, C2-AB-01, C2-CX-01, C4-PE-01, R4-CS-06	30 Okt 2014	13	£2.99
85	A2-MI-01, A3-KI-01, X2-PI-01, X3-OG-01, F1-FR-18, F3-GI-01, F5-AG-01, S1-SM-24, S3-DE-01, K2-VI-01, K3-XA-01, C4-UC-01, R4-GU-01	6 Nov 2014	13	£2.99
86	A2-SW-03, A3-CN-01, X2-AT-01, X2-NO-02, F1-FR-19, F2-ME-02, S3-CL-01, S3-ST-01, S5-BW-01, K3-HI-01, C2-EX-01, C2-GG-05, R2-JO-01	13 Nov 2014	13	£2.99
87	A2-CP-10, A2-HK-09, X2-TU-01, X3-TR-01, X5-MM-01, F1-FR-20, F3-MN-01, S1-SM-25, S2-AL-01, K2-FN-01, C4-NO-01, R2-RS-01, R2-SL-02	20 Nov 2014	13	£2.99
-	Hulk Special (includes figurine)	20 Nov 2014	20 pages	£19.99
88	A2-WA-02, A3-CO-01, A5-NG-01, X2-AO-01, X3-SA-03, F1-FR-21, S3-MJ-01, S4-DB-02, K2-NN-01, K3-DB-01, C3-SU-01, C3-TY-01, R3-EO-01	27 Nov 2014	13	£2.99
89	A2-FB-01, A5-CR-01, X2-AL-02, X3-WE-01, F1-FR-22, F2-FA-01, S2-NL-01, S3-GR-04, K2-DD-13, K2-FC-01, C3-HE-02, C3-SW-01, R2-SL-03	4 Dec 2014	13	£2.99
90	A2-HK-10, A3-KC-01, X1-XX-01, X3-MN-01, F1-FR-23, F3-GR-01, F5-TX-01, S1-SM-26, S2-KA-02, K2-DD-11, K3-MD-01, C2-SK-01, R4-CS-07	11 Dec 2014	13	£2.99
91	A2-HK-11, A2-SO-01, X2-MV-01, X2-SF-01, F1-FR-24, F3-TZ-01, S2-SI-01, S3-SH-01, K2-DD-14, K4-OE-01, C2-NC-01, C3-TH-06, R4-ST-01	18 Dec 2014	13	£2.99
92	A2-QK-01, A2-TH-06, A5-IA-02, X2-AR-01, X2-XB-01, X3-NA-01, F3-NS-01, S3-PH-01, S3-SO-02, K2-WO-01, C1-RI-01, R1-MT-01, R4-CW-02		13	£2.99
93	A1-AG-01, A1-GL-01, A2-HK-06, X2-AL-03, X2-BE-02, F3-KI-01, S3-CH-02, S3-KN-01, K2-DD-15, K3-DS-01, C2-RI-01, R1-MT-02, R2-HO-01		13	£2.99
94	A1-AV-03, A2-SA-01, A2-WA-03, A3-ZZ-01, X2-CY-06, X2-FA-01, F3-SS-01, S1-SM-27, S3-LO-01, K2-SH-02, C4-SP-01, R1-MT-03, R4-ET-02		13	£2.99
95	A2-JR-01, A3-LE-02, X2-CP-01, X2-KA-01, F2-TI-11, S1-SM-28, S1-SM-29, S3-GI-01, K2-BU-01, K2-NC-01, C2-SD-01, R1-MT-04, R4-ET-01		13	£2.99
96	A2-SH-04, A3-LL-01, X2-BK-01, X2-CA-02, X2-PU-01, X3-GE-01, F2-IW-06, S2-SQ-01, S3-VR-01, K2-BF-01, K5-LF-01, C2-LI-01, R1-MT-05		13	£2.99
97			13	£2.99
98	A1-UL-01, A2-UI-01, A2-UT-01, X1-XU-01, X2-UW-01, F1-UF-01, F3-UD-01, S2-MM-01, S2-US-01, K2-UD-01, C3-UG-01, R1-UU-01, R4-CH-03		13	£2.99
99	A1-AG-02, A2-TI-01, X2-HU-01, X2-ME-01, X2-WP-01, F2-HU-01, S3-AN-01, K2-MC-02, K2-MT-02, C2-ET-02, C4-BU-01, R1-MT-06, R2-SL-04		13	£2.99
100	A2-AC-01, A3-MA-01, A3-RU-01, A3-UL-04, X2-HU-03, X2-WV-13, F3-FA-01, S3-GO-01, K3-BD-01, K4-PS-01, C2-OM-01, R1-MT-08, R2-BK-01		13	£2.99
101	A2-UA-01, A3-BZ-01, A5-GO-01, X2-HU-04, X2-MI-01, F2-BP-02, F3-GO-01, S2-MP-01, S3-MM-01, K2-LO-01, C4-MC-01, R1-MT-09, R4-DH-01		13	£2.99
102	A2-HP-05, A3-BI-01, X2-HU-05, X2-IC-01, X2-MR-01, F2-DD-01, S2-KA-03, S3-OV-01, K3-EE-01, K5-GH-01, C3-LU-01, R1-MT-10, R4-SI-01		13	£2.99
103	A2-TH-07, A3-GT-01, A3-MY-01, A5-GU-01, X2-HU-06, X3-DE-01, F3-EL-01, S3-ER-01, S3-MN-01, K2-CD-02, C2-GR-02, R1-MT-11, R4-HD-01		13	£2.99
-	Black Widow Special (includes figurine)	12 Mar 2015	20 pages	£15.99
104			13	£2.99
105			13	£2.99
106			13	£2.99
107			13	£2.99
108			13	£2.99
109			13	£3.50
110			13	£3.50
111			13	£3.50
112			13	£3.50
113			13	£3.50
114			13	£3.50
115			13	£3.50
116			13	£3.50
117			13	£3.50
118			13	£3.50
119			13	£3.50
120			13	£3.50
121			13	£3.50
122			13	£3.50
123			13	£3.50
124			13	£3.50
125			13	£3.50
126			13	£3.50
127			13	£3.50
128			13	£3.50
129			13	£3.50
130			13	£3.50
131			13	£3.50
132			13	£3.99
133			13	£3.99
134			13	£3.50
135			13	£3.50
136			13	£3.50
137			13	£3.50
138			13	£3.50
139			13	£3.50
140			13	£3.99
141			13	£3.99
142			13	£3.50
143			13	£3.50
144			13	£3.50
145			13	£3.50
146			13	£3.50
147			13	£3.50
148			13	£3.50
149			13	£3.50
150			13	£3.50
151			13	£3.50
152			13	£3.50
153			13	£3.50
154			13	£3.50
155			13	£3.50
156			13	£3.50
157			13	£3.50
158			13	£3.50
159			13	£3.50
160			13	£3.50
161			13	£3.50
162			13	£3.50
163			13	£3.50
164			13	£3.50
165			13	£3.50
166			13	£3.50
167			13	£3.50
168			13	£3.50
169			13	£3.50
170			13	£3.50
171			13	£3.50
172			13	£3.50
173			13	£3.50
174			13	£3.50
175			13	£3.50
176			13	£3.50
177			13	£3.50
178			13	£3.50
179			13	£3.50
180			13	
181			13	
182			13	
183			13	
184			13	
185			13	
186			13	
187			13	
188			13	
189			13	
190			13	
191			13	
192			13	
193			13	
194			13	
195			13	
196			13	
197			13	
198			13	
199			13	
200			13	

=== Specials (featuring figurines) ===
#	Info	Publ. Date	Sheets	Orig. Price
Regular specials
-	Ultron		20 pages	£16.99
-	Ant-Man		20 pages	£15.99
-	Hawkeye		20 pages	£16.99
-	Vision		20 pages	£16.99
-	She-Hulk		20 pages	£16.99
-	Red Hulk		20 pages	£19.99
-	Invincible Iron Man		20 pages	£16.99
-	Doctor Strange		20 pages	£?
-	Amazing Spider-Man		20 pages	£?
-	Incredible Hulk		20 pages	£?
-	Captain America		20 pages	£?
-	Black Panther		20 pages	£18.99
-	Spider-Gwen		20 pages	£?
-	Ultimate Spider-Man		20 pages	£?
-	Black Widow		20 pages	£18.99
-	Mighty Thor		20 pages	£?
-	Doctor Doom		20 pages	£?
-	Wolverine		20 pages	£18.99
-	Deadpool		20 pages	£?
-	War Machine		20 pages	£?
-	Planet Hulk		20 pages	£?
Classic specials
-	Iron Man		20 pages	£16.99
-	Captain America		20 pages	£16.99
-	Hulk		20 pages	£15.99
-	Wasp		20 pages	£16.99
-	Giant-Man Special (includes figurine)		20 pages	£16.99
-	Thor Special (includes figurine)		20 pages	£16.99
Marvel Knights specials
-	Daredevil		20 pages	£16.99
-	Elektra		20 pages	£16.99
-	Punisher		20 pages	£16.99
-	Kingpin		20 pages	£16.99
-	Luke Cage Special (includes figurine)		20 pages	£?
-	Iron Fist Special (includes figurine)		20 pages	£16.99
Cosmic Marvel specials
-	Rocket Raccoon		20 pages	£16.99
-	Star-Lord		20 pages	£16.99
-	Thanos		20 pages	£16.99
-	Gamora		20 pages	£16.99
-	Groot		20 pages	£16.99
-	Drax the Destroyer		20 pages	£16.99

== Credits ==
Editors in order of stewardship: John Tomlinson, Sven Wilson, Matt McAllister

Art Editors: Colin Williams, Dan Rachael

== See also ==
- List of Marvel Comics characters
- List of Marvel Comics teams and organizations
- List of Marvel Comics publications
- The Classic Marvel Figurine Collection
- Official Handbook of the Marvel Universe
