= Avengers World =

Marvel comic series

- Cover for Avengers World #1 (January 2014). Art by John Cassaday & Laura Martin.

Publication information
- Publisher: Marvel Comics
- Schedule: Monthly
- Format: Ongoing series
- Genre: Superhero
- Publication date: January 2014 – July 2015

Creative team
- Created by: Nick Spencer; Jonathan Hickman; Stefano Caselli
- Written by: Nick Spencer; Jonathan Hickman
- Artist: Stefano Caselli

Avengers World (also known as A-World) is an ongoing comic series that was published by Marvel Comics as part of the third wave of Marvel NOW!, from January 2014 until July 2015.

== Publication history ==
Spencer said, "What the book is all about is really in the title. This is a book about geography. It's about what Marvel Earth looks like now. Obviously we've seen the Avengers make a pretty big statement about this world being under their protection and them being the representatives of our world. So it felt like it was time to do a book about what that planet looks like; not just Marvel New York or Marvel Space, but what does Marvel Europe, Asia and Africa look like right now? So it was a chance to do a story that was really global in scope and go some places that maybe we haven't been to before and really play with the idea of what that changing landscape would look like."

== Plot ==
Steve Rogers and Bruce Banner meet with S.H.I.E.L.D. director Maria Hill to discuss matters involving the cooperation between the Avengers and S.H.I.E.L.D. regarding the peacekeeping of national and global security. Elsewhere, a massive full-scale riot has broken out in Madripoor, with the only calm zone being a temple housed by Gorgon and the Hand. The Hand raise Madripoor out of the water as the island is revealed to rest upon the head of a massive dragon. Meanwhile, Hawkeye, Nightmask, Spider-Woman, and Star Brand are sent to investigate massive disappearances in Velletri, Italy. Smasher, Cannonball, and Sunspot investigate an outbreak of seismic activity, but are captured by A.I.M. troopers.

Scientist Supreme Andrew Forson decides to release Smasher from imprisonment, saying she will be his "messenger." Meanwhile, on the S.H.I.E.L.D. Helicarrier, Bruce Banner is briefing Captain America, Maria Hill, and a group of S.H.I.E.L.D. agents on the escalating situation at A.I.M. Island. Captain America orders Thor's team to go and help. Back on the island, Smasher finally gets out of her cell and discovers an alien-looking garden outside. Forson tells Smasher that her teammates are being cared for and they can leave at any time. As they tour the garden, Forson says that a being that has seen the end of the universe lives there and that he opened A.I.M.'s eyes to allow them to better mankind.

After taking out all of the present Hand ninjas, Shang-Chi challenges Gorgon. Shang-Chi, knowing Gorgon's gaze can turn a man to stone, extinguishes all the torches with a clap of his hands to cover their fight with darkness. Gorgon counters by setting the temple ablaze, arguing that it can be restored but Shang-Chi can not. Shang-Chi fights well, but is eventually overcome and thrown off the edge of Madripoor.

Hawkeye, Nightmask, Spider-Woman, and Star Brand are exploring their surroundings in Velletai trying to ascertain where they are. Nightmask is concerned for Star Brand and the voices he is hearing. Suddenly, dark beings rise out of the nearby "river" and start attacking. The Avengers defend themselves, but Star Brand is distracted by his former classmate Kelly Overton. He chases after her but finds himself back in his old high school. On the Helicarrier, Maria Hill calls in Sebastian Druid for magical support. Druid explains that the cities of the dead are spirit traps built by the Cult of Entropy where lost tormented souls gather and are unable to move on to the next realm. However, the power of these cities grew beyond the control of the Cult of Entropy and only those strong in magic have any chance of survival within one. Back in Velletai, Star Brand discovers that the souls present are the victims of the disaster caused when he got his powers. Begging for forgiveness, he is carried before their ruler Morgan le Fay.

As Bruce Banner discusses how to drop the rescue party on A.I.M. Island, he avoids questions from the S.H.I.E.L.D. agents present about his control over Hulk. Meanwhile, Iron Man tries to get Manifold to teleport Thor's group into A.I.M. Island. Manifold states that he is still trying to get control of his powers. In order to find his center, Manifold turns to Captain Universe for help. Afterwards, Manifold manages to teleport Thor's group to A.I.M. Island.

As Black Widow and Wolverine are fighting the rioters on Madripoor, Falcon is looking for Shang-Chi as Gorgon makes plans to use the dragon to attack China. Falcon continues his search for Shang-Chi until he comes across the Chinese intelligence-gathering agency S.P.E.A.R. As S.P.E.A.R. leader Xian Zheng speaks with Falcon, the Circle comes under attack by Hand ninjas. To combat the Hand ninjas, S.P.E.A.R. deploys the Ascendants (consisting of Devastator, Monkey King, Sabre, Vector, and Weather Witch).

== Collected editions ==
Avengers World has been collected in the following trade paperbacks:

Title	Material Collected	Publication Date	ISBN
Avengers World Vol. 1: A.I.M.PIRE	Avengers World #1-5 and material from All-New Marvel Now! Point One	July 2014	978-0785189817
Avengers World Vol. 2: Ascension	Avengers World #6-9, Avengers (vol. 5) #34.1	November 2014	978-0785190943
Avengers World Vol. 3: Next World	Avengers World #10-16	February 2015	978-0785192510
Avengers World Vol. 4: Before Time Runs Out	Avengers World #17-21, Avengers (vol. 5) #34.2	September 2015	978-0785192527
Avengers World: The Complete Collection	Avengers World #1-21, Avengers (vol. 5) 34.1,34.2 and material from All-New Marvel Now! Point One	April 2019	978-1302916176
