= Scott Reed (comics) =

American cartoonist

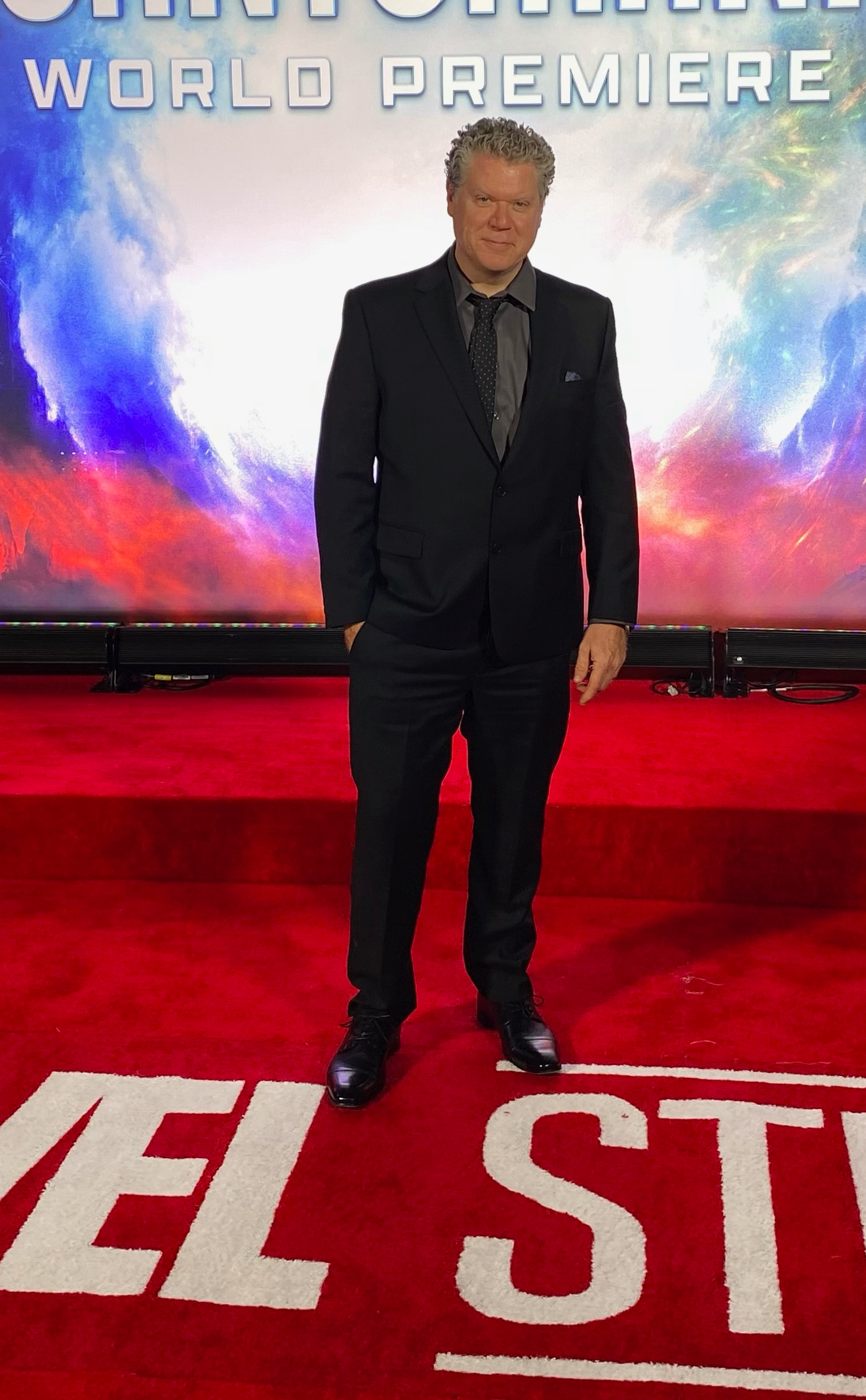
- Reed at the world premiere of Ant-Man and the Wasp: Quantumania in 2023
- Born: July 13, 1970 (age 56) Vienna, West Virginia
- Area: Comic book creator
- Notable works: The Incredible Hulk; The Overman; G.I. Joe; Godzilla

Scott Reed (born 1970) is an American illustrator, comic book artist and author from Reedsville, Ohio. His earliest comic work as a writer and inker appeared in Silverwolf Comics (Greater Mercury Comics) Eradicators in 1990. In 1993, he worked on-staff as an inker for Malibu Comics until 1996, when he was hired by Dark Horse Comics to provide inks for Godzilla and G.I. Joe Extreme comic book mini-series. For the next several years, he produced creator-owned online comics under his self-publishing label Webs Best Comics. In 2007, he and artist Shane White collaborated on The Overman, an apocalyptic noir science fiction mini-series published by Image Comics. In 2010, Reed wrote two mini-series for Marvel Comics: Realm of Kings: Son of Hulk, and Incredible Hulks: Enigma Force, which re-introduced several Microverse characters into the Marvel Universe. Both series were penciled by Miguel Munera. In 2012, Reed wrote, illustrated and published Saga Of A Doomed Universe, a graphic novel included in Boing-Boing's 'Best Damn Comics of the Year' of 2012. The first two issues of Reed's planned 6-issue comic book mini-series, Hark, was published in 2020 and 2022 under his creator-owned label Beyond Forward Comics. Saga of a Doomed Universe was re-published in a special edition format in 2023 by CEX Publishing, which included new variant cover art by Reed. A character co-created by Reed, Jentorra, was prominently featured in the 2023 Marvel Studios film Ant-Man and the Wasp: Quantumania. He is currently developing a sequel to Saga of a Doomed Universe.

== Bibliography ==
- Reed, Scott. The Last Odyssey 2003 Lulu.com. ISBN 0-557-07978-0
- Reed, Scott. High Strangeness 2005 Lulu.com. ISBN 0-557-07909-8
- Reed, Scott. The Overman 2009 Image Comics. ISBN 1-60706-081-7
- Reed, Scott. Realm Of Kings 2010 Marvel Comics. ISBN 0-7851-4597-4
- Reed, Scott. Incredible Hulks: Enigma Force 2011 Marvel Comics. ISBN 978-0-7851-5134-0
- Reed, Scott. Saga Of A Doomed Universe 2012 Comixology. ISBN 978-1-1069-2528-2
- Reed, Scott. Hark 2020 Comixology.
- Reed, Scott. Hark 2020 IndyPlanet.

== Interviews ==
- Matthew McLean at Comics Bulletin about The Overman
- Zack Smith at Newsarama about Realm of Kings: Son of Hulk
- Kiel Phegley at Comic Book Resources about Hiro-Kala Incredible Hulks: Dark Son
- George Marston at Newsarama about Incredible Hulks: Enigma Force

== Reviews ==
- Harry Jay Knowles at Ain't It Cool News about The Overman
- Tonya Crawford at Broken Frontier about The Overman
- Jesse Schedeen at IGN about Realm Of Kings: Son Of Hulk
- George Marston at Newsarama about Saga Of A Doomed Universe
- Brian Heater at Boing Boing about Saga Of A Doomed Universe
