= Beta Ray Bill =

Marvel Comics fictional character

- Beta Ray Bill on the cover of The Mighty Thor #337 (November 1983); Art by Walt Simonson

Publication information
- Publisher: Marvel Comics
- First appearance: The Mighty Thor #337 (November 1983)
- Created by: Walt Simonson

In-story information
- Species: Korbinite
- Place of origin: Korbin
- Team affiliations: Omega Flight; Star Masters; Asgard; Thor Corps; Annihilators; Guardians of the Galaxy; Avengers; Defenders
- Notable aliases: Simon Walters, Beta Ray Thor
- Abilities: Superior hand to hand combatant Vast superhuman strength, speed, stamina and durability Highly extended lifespan Via Stormbreaker: Flight; Electricity manipulation Weather manipulation Via Twilight Sword: Fire manipulation

Beta Ray Bill is a fictional character appearing in American comic books published by Marvel Comics. Debuting in the Bronze Age of Comic Books, the character was initially intended to be a surprise; an apparent monster who unexpectedly turns out to be a great hero. As such, Bill is the first being outside the Marvel Universe's Norse pantheon to be introduced as being worthy to wield Thor's hammer, Mjolnir. After an initial rivalry with Thor for possession of the weapon, the alien warrior was granted a war hammer of his own, called Stormbreaker, and the two reconciled as staunch allies, going on to fight side by side.

Beta Ray Bill has been featured in other Marvel-endorsed products, such as animated television series, video games, and merchandise.

== Publication history ==
Beta Ray Bill debuted in The Mighty Thor #337 (November 1983), being established as an alien of the Korbinite race.

Bill was created by Walt Simonson as a new concept for the title Thor. Simonson said,

I wanted to start fresh, and I thought a new character would be the way to go on that. My thinking was that comics are a short form, and one of the things that's mostly true about comics characters are what they look like ... I designed Bill deliberately as a monster, because I knew that people would look at it and go, "Oh my God, it's this evil guy." I deliberately wrote them so you weren't sure in the beginning if he was a good guy or a bad guy ... I chose the name for its alliterative qualities. Originally I was going to call him 'Beta Ray Jones' because I really wanted a common name. My feeling was Bill was Everyman for this alien race ... I deleted 'Jones' because ... there were too many Joneses floating around the Marvel Universe.

During a "Thor Spotlight" panel at the Baltimore Comic Con, August 28, 2010, Simonson further stated:

One of the cool things about Thor was the enchantment around Mjolnir and the original inscription on it. So I thought, well that means someone else can pick up this hammer and get this power, if they're worthy! So since then, some other big characters, people's favorites, have picked up the hammer, Captain America, Superman, whoever. But at this point, no one had ever picked up the hammer. I liked the idea of Cap walking to the bathroom and seeing it, and grabbing and just tugging, not being able to. So this had to be someone new. This is the most powerful weapon of the Norse gods. This hammer is a killing weapon. It's used to kill Frost Giants and others. So, Superman couldn't pick it up, cause he's never going to kill anyone, and the hammer knows that. Captain America, he's too patriotic. He's too much a symbol of America to be chosen by this Norse artifact. So he couldn't get it. So I created Bill because he's noble, and he's designed to kill. He's got a great purpose as a warrior, and also the noble ability. That makes him "worthy" whatever that may be. As far as appearance, back then, comics were these self-contained stories. So for Bill, I had to do this in short form. This was a four-issue story, and that was my longest on my entire run on Thor. We had to take him, make him into a character that the Hammer would recognize. So I wanted for Bill, I wanted him to have a "monstrous" look as a visual, so that everyone would think he's a bad guy, and I got letters after the first issue that said "What on earth? Why is this monster picking up the hammer, what's wrong with you?" and I said "I got it!" So I basically started with a skull, and then I made him a bit like a horse, with the gap behind the teeth. But horses are beautiful creatures. So what I was aiming for is a sense of death, a sense of monster, underlined by beauty. His costume was the same so that the minute you see that image, when he strikes the stick and becomes "Beta Ray Thor" or whatever, you know: OK, that guy has the powers of Thor. So that's why Bill had the monstrous face, that's why that stuff was done the way it was done.

The character's introduction continued in Thor vol. 1 #338–340. He continued to make appearances in Thor sporadically. He appeared in the Maximum Security crossover in January 2001 and the Secret Invasion crossover in 2008. He starred in the six-issue miniseries Stormbreaker: The Saga of Beta Ray Bill and its two follow-ups, the one-shot Beta Ray Bill: The Green of Eden and three-issue Beta Ray Bill: Godhunter. In 2021, the character starred in a self-titled five-issue miniseries by Daniel Warren Johnson.

== Fictional character biography ==
=== 1980s ===
Spy organization S.H.I.E.L.D. detected an alien fleet passing through Earth's galaxy, with Director Nick Fury asking Thor to investigate. Thor encounters the advance ship, Skuttlebutt, which perceives him to be a threat. Unable to stop Thor, the sentient ship revives Beta Ray Bill, who is in suspended animation. Bill battles Thor to a standstill, until the ship reaches the Solar System, where one of the mystical enchantments of Thor's hammer Mjolnir comes into effect, which means that Thor will revert to his mortal persona of Donald Blake if separated from the hammer for more than 60 seconds; the hammer converts to a cane. Thor and Mjolnir become separated, causing the transformation. Blake is knocked unconscious by Bill, who examines Blake's cane and, upon striking it, transforms it to Mjolnir. Bill receives Thor's power and a variant of his costume.

Once Skuttlebutt arrives on Earth, Bill easily defeats an approaching S.H.I.E.L.D. team and is then transported to Asgard by the King of the Norse gods, Odin, who mistakes Bill for Thor. After some initial confusion, Odin returns Thor to Asgard, and Bill's origin is revealed. Bill's race, the Korbinites, were almost rendered extinct when their galaxy exploded. The remnants of the Korbinite race fled in a fleet of warships, guarded by a sentient ship called Skuttlebutt and a dedicated champion, Beta Ray Bill. Via Korbinite science, Bill was physically augmented and given the attributes of an indigenous wild beast (a process that killed all of Bill's predecessors). Skuttlebutt attacked Thor because the ship recognized the Asgardian magic as similar to that of the previous global threat, and assumed the Korbinites were being threatened once again.

On discovering that Bill was worthy enough to lift Mjolnir, Odin proposes a battle to the death in the fiery Asgardian realm of Skartheim to decide who will wield the hammer. Bill and Thor render each other unconscious. Bill's resistance to heat allows him to recover first, however, and he is deemed the winner—but he also saves Thor from falling into lava, believing he is too worthy an opponent to die, but he feels he needs the hammer to protect his people. After Bill reconsiders his claim to the hammer, Odin orders the making of a new hammer for Bill: Stormbreaker, equal in power to Mjolnir and created from the same metal and by the same dwarfs led by Eitri. Odin also transfers an enchantment from Mjolnir to Stormbreaker, so that Bill can return to his original Korbinite form by striking Stormbreaker upon the ground—and Thor can no longer become Donald Blake. After learning that the mishap that killed most of Bill's people was caused by the fire demon Surtur, one of Asgard's most powerful enemies, Bill agrees to join the Asgardians in a war to stop Surtur and his armies.

Bill leads many of Earth's heroes against Surtur's forces on Earth while Thor, Odin, and Thor's adopted brother Loki confront Surtur in Asgard. Surtur is eventually defeated, but apparently kills Odin when they both fall through a mystic portal. Bill remains on Earth, aiding the spaceknight Rom against the threat of the alien Dire Wraiths and foes such as Iron Man opponent Titanium Man.

Forming an attachment with the Asgardian goddess Sif, Bill aids Thor against the Dark Elf Kurse in a two-part storyline before returning to his people.

=== 1990s ===
Bill remains a staunch ally of Thor and Asgard before featuring in a storyline involving a creation of Galactus, Tyrant. Bill also features in the storyline "Blood and Thunder", attempting, alongside Adam Warlock, Thanos and others, to deal with the "warrior madness" of Thor through which he is trying to destroy the universe, although at one point he is struck with enough force to destroy a planet. Together with Thor, Bill joins with other versions of Thor in the Thor Corps against the entity Demonstaff.

=== 2000s ===
Thor—determined to end the perpetual cycle of death and rebirth the Asgardians are trapped in—brings about Ragnarök, the end of Asgard and its gods. Although Bill attempts to aid the Asgardians, Thor teleports Bill away as it is not his destiny to die in Ragnarök.

Bill visits his people's new homeworld, where he is attacked by his insane predecessor, Alpha Ray, defeating him just as the cosmic entity Galactus and his herald Stardust arrive. Despite Bill's efforts, Galactus consumes the world and almost kills him, with Bill drifting in space until recovered by Skuttlebutt. After finding an orb containing the souls of many of the Korbinites, Bill revisits a desolate Asgard, and joins forces with Stardust to battle a new demonic menace named Asteroth.

Although victorious, Bill is mortally wounded, and while near death is healed by an unknown entity who also claims the remaining souls in the orb. Placed in the recently deceased body of a war veteran named Simon Walters (a reference to his creator, Walt Simonson) on Earth, Bill has a brief encounter with the villain Boar and the hero Spider-Man. Bill eventually finds and joins Omega Flight against the supervillain team the Wrecking Crew, who release the Great Beasts. The battle ends with Bill and the Beasts trapped in an alternate dimension.

During the Secret Invasion storyline, Bill is wounded and captured by the alien Skrulls, who bestow his hammer Stormbreaker on a warrior Super-Skrull called the Godkiller. Thor rescues Bill, although Loki starts a rumor that Bill may be a Skrull, causing some Asgardians to go against him despite Balder telling them to stop. Thor throws Mjolnir at Bill, who catches it, proving he really is Bill. After being nursed back to health, the character retrieves his hammer. Although the Godkiller defeats him, with Thor's help, he tricks the Godkiller, causing Asgard to fall onto it, killing the Skrull. Thor and Bill then raise the city again.

Bill decides to hunt down Galactus, to avenge the destruction of the Korbinites' second homeworld, and the seeming eradication of his species. After a brief confrontation with Stardust, Bill is intercepted by the Silver Surfer, who is puzzled by the Korbinite's apparently futile quest to destroy Galactus. During a brief battle, Bill explains that while he understands he cannot hope to destroy Galactus with his power alone, he intends to destroy Galactus by annihilating any and all worlds Galactus seeks to feed from, thus starving him to death. The character's obsession with stopping Galactus eventually results in him being unable to lift his own enchanted weapon, an object that can only be wielded by the worthy. Equipped with alien weapons, Bill finds Galactus but discovers the entity already under attack by another race. In a moment of conscience, Bill saves Galactus. The grateful entity rewards Bill by creating a Korbinite mate for him, with Bill also regaining the ability to wield Stormbreaker.

=== 2010s ===
When the universe is invaded during The Thanos Imperative storyline, Beta Ray Bill joins Cosmo's select group to travel across the Fault and into the Cancerverse. Bill is recruited by Cosmo to join the Annihilators, a new group intended to replace the fallen Guardians of the Galaxy. The Annihilators defend Galador from the Dire Wraiths, resulting in a peace between the two groups who have been at war for generations. Later, when trying to end a conflict between warring factions of the Universal Church of Truth, the Annihilators are transported to a Church base on Earth and come into conflict with the Avengers.

During the "Death of the Inhumans" miniseries, Beta Ray Bill agrees to help Medusa and the surviving members of the Inhuman royal family confront the Kree. When they reach the location where Black Bolt is being attacked by Vox, Bill helps Black Bolt, and takes down Vox, who is revealed to be a brainwashed Maximus. He and the Inhuman royal family witness something on the Vox costume teleport Crystal away, killing Maximus in the process.

Nick Fury tells Thor a secret that leads him to become unworthy of Mjolnir, Thor spends months drinking and fighting to avoid thinking about his loss. Bill visits Thor- now calling himself 'Odinson'- and offers him Stormbreaker as a replacement. However, Odinson and Bill are captured by the Collector as they examines the remains of Asgard where the hammer of an alternate version of Thor had crashed. Although the Collector attempts to force Odinson to help him find some means of bypassing the worthiness enchantment so that he could lift the hammer himself, Odinson eventually escapes and uses the hammer's power to return Asgard to its original place. Once free, Odinson told Bill that the secret Fury had shared with him was "Gorr was right"; a reference to Thor's old foe Gorr the God Butcher who believed that gods brought nothing but pain and suffering to the universe. However, Bill assures Odinson that, regardless of his ability to wield Mjolnir, even if the gods were not worthy, Odinson proves himself to be a hero as he continues to fight for humanity.

=== 2020s ===
Due to a misunderstanding, a battle between Bill and a cosmically powered All-Father Thor results in Stormbreaker being destroyed. To compensate for the loss of Stormbreaker, a restored Thor appoints Bill as an advisor and allows him unrestricted access to Asgard's armory.

Bill falls into depression as Stormbreaker's absence prevents him from transforming back into his unaltered Korbinite form. After suffering numerous defeats without Stormbreaker, Bill departs Asgard on Skuttlebutt in search for a replacement. Accompanied by Skurge and Pip the Troll, Bill encounters Odin, who is unable to provide Bill with a weapon that can fix his transformation but cautiously suggests Surtur's resurfaced Twilight Sword. Bill and his allies venture into the deepest level of Muspelheim. Bill claims Twilight and uses it to kill Surtur, allowing him to revert back to his unaltered form and giving him a renewed sense of identity outside of Thor's shadow. Bill is appointed as Asgard's Master of War and with Twilight in hand, continues to aid Thor and the Asgardians.

The aftermath of the final battle between the Asgardians and Utgard-Gods results in reality being rewritten and the Asgardians being forgotten by the universe. Thor's existence in modern history is replaced with Bill, who takes his place as a founding member of the Avengers. In the process, Stormbreaker is restored and returned to Bill. Bill is a central figure in the storyline "Queen in Black", as he is the only hero who has any knowledge of Hela after the erasure of the Asgardians. Bill is chosen to lead the Defenders against Hela's forces.

== Powers and abilities ==
Beta Ray Bill's life force and consciousness were transferred by scientists of his race into the body of a carnivorous equine alien that had been bionically restructured into a cyborg. Due to advanced genetic engineering and his cyborg implants, Beta Ray Bill possesses superhuman strength, speed, stamina and durability, and an extended lifespan. Beta Ray Bill is also a superior hand-to-hand combatant. His combat prowess is such that he was able to fight Thor (noted as one of the best hand-to-hand fighters in the Marvel Universe) to a standstill.

Beta Ray Bill's weapon, Stormbreaker, has the same properties as Thor's hammer, Mjolnir, including its ability to transform into a cane when struck upon the ground and return Bill to his unaltered Korbinite form.

Beta Ray Bill has a partner in the form of a Korbinite sentient warship named Skuttlebutt. The same technology that transferred Bill's consciousness into his cyborg body was also used to transfer an unknown Korbinite's consciousness into a large combat cruiser retrofitted with medical, cargo, and humanitarian equipment and facilities to accommodate the attempt to transport Bill's people off planet to avoid the incoming attack by Galactus. Skuttlebutt often uses his medical facilities to repair Bill's tissue and implants from damage after battles. Skuttlebutt can also create a female humanoid avatar of itself.

After Stormbreaker's destruction, Beta Ray Bill replaces it with the Twilight Sword, which can generate the flames of Muspelheim. Much like with Stormbreaker, Twilight also has the ability to return Bill to his unaltered Korbinite form. Bill wields Twilight as his main weapon until Stormbreaker is restored, after which he uses both weapons together.

== Reception ==
- In 2018, CBR.com ranked Beta Ray Bill 11th in their "25 Fastest Characters In The Marvel Universe" list.

== In other media ==
=== Television ===
- Beta Ray Bill appears in the Silver Surfer episode "Innervisions", voiced by Karl Pruner. This version and his species, called "Whynnm", share a group dream using a special "dream weaver" from Zenn-La. When the Silver Surfer comes to alert them of Thanos, he convinces Bill to end the group dream and save the planet by using the dream weaver's power to trick Thanos into believing he succeeded in destroying the planet.
- Beta Ray Bill appears in The Super Hero Squad Show episode "The Ballad of Beta Ray Bill! (Six Against Infinity, Part 1)", voiced by Pat Fraley. After the Korbinites were enslaved by the Stranger, Bill took refuge in the Skuttlebutt space station, working as its janitor ever since. When Thor ends up on the Skuttlebutt following a battle with the Dark Surfer and the Stranger finds them, Bill helps Thor defeat the Stranger and free his people using Mjolnir. Following the battle, Mjolnir transforms Bill's toilet brush into a hammer he eventually dubs "Stormbreaker" and Bill works with his people to help Thor get back to Earth.
- Beta Ray Bill appears in The Avengers: Earth's Mightiest Heroes episode "The Ballad of Beta Ray Bill", voiced by Steve Blum. After Surtur destroys the Korbinites' homeworld, the survivors genetically modify Bill before going into hibernation on the Skuttlebutt starship, with Bill serving as their protector while he searches for a new world for them. When Surtur's fire demons attack the Skuttlebutt, Thor intervenes. However, Bill initially mistakes him for a threat and wields Mjolnir against him, only to be teleported to Asgard by Odin, who was trying to bring Thor back. Bill attacks everyone present until Odin subdues him. Realizing his mistake, Bill reveals he has the ability to read the auras of others; through this ability, he mistook the Asgardians as enemies due to them sharing the exact same auras as Surtur's demons. After confessing his plight to the Asgardians, he travels with Thor and Sif to see Eitri for help. Following this, Bill receives Stormbreaker and joins Thor and Sif in fighting off the remaining fire demons and the brainwashed Enchantress. Once the Skuttlebutt is safe, Bill departs to continue his mission, promising to help Thor battle Surtur when the time comes.

=== Film ===
- Beta Ray Bill appears in Planet Hulk, voiced by Paul Dobson. Having been previously captured and brainwashed by the Red King, Bill is forced to fight the Red King's gladiators until the Hulk destroys Bill's mind control disk and nearly kills him while his guard was down. Bill later saves the Hulk and the gladiators, freeing them of their control disks and offering to bring the Hulk back to Earth, though the latter declines.
- Beta Ray Bill was included in an early version of the Marvel Cinematic Universe film Thor: Ragnarok, though he was ultimately cut. Producer Kevin Feige said, "it was so quick ... and it just didn't do it justice. And the feeling is, if you can't do it justice, do it later".

=== Video games ===
- Beta Ray Bill appears as an alternate skin for Thor in Marvel: Ultimate Alliance and Marvel Heroes.
- Beta Ray Bill appears as a DLC character in Lego Marvel Super Heroes, voiced again by Steve Blum.
- Beta Ray Bill appears in Guardians of the Galaxy: The Universal Weapon.
- Beta Ray Bill appears as a playable character in Marvel: Avengers Alliance.
- Beta Ray Bill appears as a playable character in Lego Marvel's Avengers, voiced again by Steve Blum.
- Beta Ray Bill appears as a playable character in Marvel: Future Fight.
- Beta Ray Bill appears as a playable character in Marvel Puzzle Quest.
- Beta Ray Bill appears as a playable character in Marvel Contest of Champions.
- Beta Ray Bill appears as a playable character in Marvel Cosmic Invasion, voiced again by Steve Blum.

=== Merchandise ===
- Beta Ray Bill received a 6-inch figure in the Marvel Legends toy line in 2006.
- Beta Ray Bill received a 96mm statue from The Classic Marvel Figurine Collection.
- Beta Ray Bill received two Minimates in November 2011, with one released as part of a two-park with an "Armored Thor" while the other was released in a "Stormbreaker" box-set with figures of Thor, Sif and Loki.
- Beta Ray Bill was released as part of the Marvel Universe 3 3/4 inch toyline in 2012.
- Beta Ray Bill appears as a playable character in the Marvel HeroClix sets "Critical Mass" and "Galactic Guardians".
- Beta Ray Bill received a figure in the Marvel Legends toy line in 2019.
- Beta Ray Bill received a Funko pop in 2020 as part of the Marvel 80th Anniversary series.

== Collected editions ==
Title	Material collected	Published date	ISBN
The Mighty Thor: The Ballad of Beta Ray Bill	The Mighty Thor #337–340	December 1989	978-0871356147
Stormbreaker: The Saga of Beta Ray Bill	Stormbreaker: The Saga of Beta Ray Bill #1-6	September 2005	978-0785117209
Thor: Ragnaroks	Stormbreaker: The Saga of Beta Ray Bill #1-6 and Thor: Blood Oath #1-6, Thor (vol. 2) #80-85	October 2017	978-1302907945
Beta Ray Bill: Godhunter	Beta Ray Bill: Godhunter #1-3 and Secret Invasion Aftermath: Beta Ray Bill - The Green of Eden	November 2009	978-0785142324
Annihilation: Scourge	Annihilation - Scourge: Beta Ray Bill and Annihilation - Scourge: Alpha, Nova, Silver Surfer, Fantastic Four and Omega	March 2020	978-1302921699
Beta Ray Bill: Argent Star	Beta Ray Bill #1-5	December 2021	978-1302928124
