= Hiro-Kala =

Marvel Comics supervillain

Publication information
- Publisher: Marvel Comics
- First appearance: Skaar: Son of Hulk #2 (September 2008)
- Created by: Greg Pak (writer); Ron Garney (artist)

In-story information
- Alter ego: Hiro-Kala Banner
- Species: Human mutate/Sakaaran Hybrid
- Place of origin: Sakaar
- Partnerships: Skaar; Hulk
- Notable aliases: Son of the Hulk; Grayface; He of Shadow; Hiro; King of K′ai; Life-Bringer; Lord of K′ai; Outworlder
- Abilities: Expert swordsman and unarmed combatant; Transformation; Superhuman strength, stamina, durability, agility, and reflexes; New Power

Hiro-Kala is a supervillain appearing in American comic books published by Marvel Comics. The character is usually depicted as an adversary of the Hulk. Created by writer Greg Pak and artist Ron Garney, he first appeared in Skaar: Son of Hulk #2 (September 2008). He is the son of the Hulk and Caiera and the twin brother of Skaar.

== Publication history ==
Skaar: Son of Hulk changed name to Son of Hulk with issue #13 and the series saw a change of focus to Hiro-Kala under new writer Paul Jenkins. The series ran to issue #17.

Following the conclusion of this series, he went on to feature in Realm of Kings: Son of Hulk by Scott Reed, with art by Miguel Munera.

The character next features in the "Dark Son" storyline by writers Greg Pak and Scott Redd, which ran bi-weekly in The Incredible Hulks #611-617, and The Incredible Hulk comic book, which featured Hulk, Red She-Hulk, Skaar, She-Hulk, A-Bomb, and Korg.

== Fictional character biography ==
Hiro-Kala is the twin brother of Skaar and the son of Caiera and the Hulk. The two are not yet born when Sakaar is devastated by the explosion of the Hulk's ship. Caiera uses her Old Power to protect her womb, saving Skaar and Hiro-Kala from the blast, but landing them in fire. Skaar survives the lava effortlessly, having been born with Hulk's physiology. Hiro-Kala, however, only survives by using the Old Power to protect himself.

Hiro-Kala is enslaved shortly after his birth, but escapes into the desert. He encounters the priest Hiro-Amin, who has been chained to a rock. Hiro-Kala frees Hiro-Amin, who explains that he can obtain the Old Power by killing someone else who possesses it. Hiro-Kala kills Hiro-Amin and sees the Old Power manifest as a blue beam of light, but it flies away instead of going into him. He joins an honor guard led by Axeman Bone, who gave him the axe that he used to kill Hiro-Amin.

Galactus later destroys Sakaar, absorbing its Old Power and satiating his hunger for an estimated 10,000 years. Skaar blasts Galactus with a surge of Old Power, giving him an uncontrollable hunger for the Old Power. Following Sakaar's destruction, Hiro-Kala leads the survivors of Sakaar to find a new planet.

During the Sakaarans' search, Hiro-Kala lands on the planet K'ai in the Microverse, having been summoned there by Jentorra. Learning of his father's exploits there, Hiro-Kala attempts to conquer the planet, but ends up saving the dying world and pulling it out of the Microverse. Hiro-Kala then attempts to take control of K'ai's Worldmind. The Worldmind, reaching into Hiro-Kala's mind, attempts to dissuade him from his path by showing him its memories of the Hulk, but is unsuccessful. Hiro-Kala takes control of K'ai's Worldmind, enslaves the inhabitants of K'ai, and plans to destroy Earth.

As K'ai enters the Solar System, Hiro-Kala mentally connects with Skaar, alerting him of his coming. With this knowledge, Hulk gathers his allies to stop Hiro-Kala. Hiro-Kala reveals that he intends to make K'ai collide with Earth, destroying both planets and their Old Power. Skaar is seemingly killed during the battle, but is revealed to have survived and uses the Old Power to encase Hiro-Kala in stone. At the same time, the rest of "Team Hulk" sets off an explosion that knocks K'ai off course, saving Earth. K'ai's Worldmind takes Hiro-Kala into the planet's core to heal it.

In Imperial (2025), Hiro-Kala is revealed to have become the leader of Sakaar En Nevo, a planet housing refugees from Sakaar. However, he is fatally poisoned as part of a larger conspiracy targeting galactic leaders.

== Powers and abilities ==
Being born on a war-torn planet, Hiro-Kala is experienced at unarmed combat and swordsmanship. He quickly matured to his teen years, discovered the Old Power, and combined it with the Power Cosmic into a different form known as the New Power. He has immense strength, stamina, durability, agility, and reflexes. His New Power possesses similar qualities to the original set, but on a cosmic level. This allows him to perform various feats, including power bestowal, force fields, precognitive visions, energy blasts, mental control, technopathy, and generating spatial rifts.

== Collected editions ==
Hiro-Kala's appearances have been collected into trade paperbacks:

- Son of Hulk: Dark Son Rising (collects Son of Hulk #13-17, 120 pages, hardcover, February 2010, ISBN 0-7851-4544-3, softcover, June 2010, ISBN 0-7851-4055-7)
- Realm of Kings (includes Realm of Kings: Son of Hulk #1-4, 336 pages, hardcover, August 2010, ISBN 0-7851-4809-4)
- Incredible Hulks: Dark Son (collects Incredible Hulks #612-617, hardcover, February 2011, ISBN 0-7851-5299-7)
