= The Thanos Imperative =

2010 comic book limited series

- Cover of The Thanos Imperative 1 (July 2010), art by Aleksi Briclot

Publication information
- Publisher: Marvel Comics
- Schedule: Monthly
- Title(s): The Thanos Imperative: Ignition #1 The Thanos Imperative #1-6; The Thanos Imperative Devastation #1; Guardians of the Galaxy #25 Nova #36
- Formats: Original material for the series has been published as a set of limited series and one-shot comics.
- Genre: Science fiction, superhero
- Publication date: The Thanos Imperative: Ignition: May 2010; The Thanos Imperative: June 2010 - November 2011
- Number of issues: The Thanos Imperative: Ignition: 1 The Thanos Imperative: 6 The Thanos Imperative: Devastation: 1
- Main character(s): Thanos; Guardians of the Galaxy; Nova; Quasar; Silver Surfer; Galactus; Lord Mar-Vell

Creative team
- Writer(s): Dan Abnett; Andy Lanning
- Artist(s): The Thanos Imperative: Miguel Angel Sepulveda
- Penciller(s): The Thanos Imperative: Ignition: Brad Walker
- Inker(s): The Thanos Imperative: Ignition: Andrew Hennessy
- Letterer(s): Joe Caramagna
- Colorist(s): The Thanos Imperative: Ignition: Wilfredo Quintana; The Thanos Imperative: Jay David Ramos
- Editor(s): Rachel Pinnelas; Joe Quesada; Bill Rosemann

Reprints
- Collected editions
- Hardcover: ISBN 0-7851-5183-4

The Thanos Imperative is a six-issue comic book limited series published in 2010 by Marvel Comics. It was written by Dan Abnett and Andy Lanning, and was bookended by two one-shot comics, Ignition and Devastation. The story focuses on the cosmic heroes of the Marvel Universe, who band together to combat the imminent threat of the Fault (a rift in space-time formed at the end of "War of Kings") and the Cancerverse (a universe where death itself is extinct) that lies beyond it.

== Publication history ==
The story is the culmination of events starting with the "Annihilation" storyline and more specifically the "War of Kings", which climaxed with the opening of a hole between alternate universes, and "Realm of Kings", which involved different characters in conflict with the many-angled ones and counterparts of the Earth-616 superheroes. The aftermath of those storylines was dealt with in Guardians of the Galaxy #25 and Nova #36, after which both titles were cancelled.

== Plot synopsis ==
While the Guardians of the Galaxy watch over the newly resurrected and imprisoned Thanos and Nova pursues the false Quasar, the Magus and the Universal Church of Truth tear open the Fault (opened at the end of the War of Kings and previously sealed by Adam Warlock). Monstrous creatures emerge from the Fault and are confronted by the Kree and Shi'ar armadas, Galactus, the Celestials, and other cosmic beings. Among the invaders is their leader, Lord Mar-Vell, who is an alternate version of Captain Marvel. Mar-Vell kills the Magus for failing to locate Thanos. Mar-Vell is the de facto leader of the extradimensional Cancerverse—a metaphysically unbalanced dimension where Death itself has been completely banished and Life runs rampant, like a cancer—and seeks to spread his dimension's plague of "undeath" to all other universes.

Mar-Vell is the avatar of Life, and Thanos is the avatar of Death. Because of this, the battle will only be over when one of them destroys the other. While Star-Lord leads the Guardians and Thanos into the Fault hoping to locate Lord Mar-Vell, Lord Mar-Vell scours the Marvel Universe for Thanos. Nova leads Quasar, Beta Ray Bill, Gladiator, the Silver Surfer and Ronan the Accuser in an attack on Mar-Vell, but loses badly. When Thanos kills Drax the Destroyer, his death as the avatar of life alerts Mar-Vell to his presence and he returns to the Cancerverse.

When Mar-Vell confronts Thanos and the Guardians, everyone is surprised when Thanos immediately surrenders. As he willingly prepares to be sacrificed by Mar-Vell, he muses about how the Captain Marvel he knew never considered the consequences of his actions either. Mar-Vell realizes he has been tricked just as Death, summoned by Thanos's death, arrives to claim him. This causes a chain reaction that kills Mar-Vell's followers and triggers the collapse of the alternate universe and the Fault. Thanos, expecting Death to embrace him for his actions, becomes enraged when she once again spurns him. Teleporting the rest of their comrades to safety, Star Lord and Nova remain behind to contain Thanos, who blames the heroes for Death's manipulation of him and vows to make the entire universe suffer, by keeping him within the Cancerverse until its imminent destruction.

A memorial service is held for those lost in the conflicts. Quasar informs Rocket Raccoon that, without Nova, Worldmind has shut down and the Nova Force disappeared. Still reeling from the struggle, the Kree Empire on Hala is assailed by the forces of Blastaar in a bid for easy conquest. During the battle, Ronan is aided by the other surviving members of Nova's strike force. Under Cosmo's guidance, they set up base in Knowhere. The newly christened "Annihilators" propose they be a loose-knit force to be implemented only as the "last resort". Abruptly, Ikon of the Spaceknights materializes in their midst, proclaiming urgency in her errand and asking where to find "this team [she is] supposed to lead".

== Critical reception ==
The crossover received critical acclaim. According to Comic Book Roundup, it received an average score of 8.3 out of 10 based on 42 reviews.

== Collected editions ==
The series was released in a collected edition.

- The Thanos Imperative (collects The Thanos Imperative 1–6, The Thanos Imperative: Ignition, The Thanos Imperative: Devastation, and the Thanos Sourcebook, 208 pages, hardcover, February 2011, ISBN 0-7851-5183-4 softcover, September 2011, ISBN 0785149023)

It is also included in two omnibuses:

- Guardians of the Galaxy by Abnett & Lanning Omnibus, 936 pages, hardcover, 2016, ISBN 978-0-7851-9834-5
- War of Kings Aftermath: Realm of Kings Omnibus, 1248 pages, hardcover, 2017, ISBN 978-1-302-90447-0
