= Realm of Kings =

Crossover comic book storyline

- Cover of Realm of Kings 1 (January 2010 ) Featuring Quasar (center, front) and an alternate version of the Avengers, art by Clint Langley
- Publisher: Marvel Comics
- Publication date: November 2009 – March 2010
- Genre: Science fiction, superhero; Crossover
Title(s)
Realm of Kings (one-shot)
Realm of Kings: Imperial Guard #1-5
Realm of Kings: Inhumans #1-5
Guardians of the Galaxy (vol. 2) #20-24
Nova (vol. 4) #31-35
Realm of Kings: Son of Hulk #1-4
- Main character(s): Shi'ar; Inhumans; Kree; Guardians of the Galaxy; Starjammers; Nova; Darkhawk

Creative team
- Writer(s): Dan Abnett; Andy Lanning; Son of Hulk; Scott Reed
- Artist(s): Realm of Kings; Mahmud Asrar; Leonardo Manco; Nova; Andrea Di Vito; Imperial Guard; Kev Walker
- Penciller(s): Guardians of the Galaxy; Brad Walker; Inhumans; Pablo Raimondi; Son of Hulk; Miguel Munera
- Inker(s): Guardians of the Galaxy; Victor Olazaba; Inhumans; Andrew Hennessy; Son of Hulk; Terry Pallot
- Realm of Kings: ISBN 0-7851-4809-4
- Guardians of the Galaxy: ISBN 0-7851-4543-5
- Nova: ISBN 0-7851-4067-0

"Realm of Kings" is a crossover comic book storyline published in 2010 by Marvel Comics. Written by Dan Abnett and Andy Lanning, it is a follow-up to the 2009 storyline "War of Kings". The series introduced the setting known as the Cancerverse, an alternate universe that was conquered by the Many-Angled Ones and their servants. The first of their servants was Mar-Vell, who they saved from the cancer that would have killed him.

== Publication history ==
The series started with a Realm of Kings one-shot that establishes the setting and is followed by a number of separate series or storylines which focus on how the different characters, Imperial Guard, Inhumans, Guardians of the Galaxy and Nova, deal with this situation.

The storyline also includes the limited series Realm of Kings: Son of Hulk by Scott Reed, with art by Miguel Munera. This focuses on Hiro-Kala and his journey into the Microverse.

== Plot summary ==
A giant time-space tear called the Fault had been created by Black Bolt's T-Bomb, killing both himself and the Shi'ar leader Vulcan. The Fault becomes an immediate concern for the Guardians of the Galaxy and the Nova Corps, who send Wendell Vaughn, the first Quasar, into the Fault to scout it. Quasar discovers that the Fault is a tunnel leading to another universe that is ruled by a corrupted Mar-Vell and his servants, evil organic masses who consumed their universe like a cancer. It is described as a Cancerverse, where "Life has won, Death has lost." He is captured by that universe's Avengers (called the Revengers), who plan on imposing their Earth on his, to enable their gods, the Many-Angled Ones, to continue to spread.

== Titles ==
- Realm of Kings (one shot)
- Realm of Kings: Imperial Guard #1-5
- Realm of Kings: Inhumans #1-5
- Guardians of the Galaxy (vol. 2) #20-24
- Nova (vol. 4) #31-35
- Realm of Kings: Son of Hulk #1-4

== Collected editions ==
| Title | Material collected | Published date | ISBN |
|---|---|---|---|
| Realm of Kings | Realm of Kings, Realm of Kings: Inhumans #1-5, Realm of Kings: Son of Hulk #1-4, Realm of Kings: Imperial Guard #1-5 | August 2010 | 978-0785148098 |
| Realm of Kings: Imperial Guard | Realm of Kings Imperial Guard #1-5 | June 2010 | 978-0785145974 |
| Guardians of the Galaxy Volume 4: Realm of Kings | Guardians of the Galaxy (vol. 2) #20-25, Realm of Kings | June 2010 | 978-0785145431 |
| Nova Volume 6: Realm of Kings | Nova (vol. 4) #29-36 | June 2010 | 978-0785140672 |
| War of Kings Aftermath: Realm of Kings Omnibus | Realm of Kings, Realm of Kings: Inhumans #1-5, Realm of Kings: Son of Hulk #1-4, Realm of Kings: Imperial Guard #1-5, Nova (vol. 4) #29-36, Guardians of the Galaxy (vol. 2) #20-25, Thanos Imperative #1-6, Ignition, Devastation, Annihilators #1-4, Annihilators: Earthfall #1-4, Thanos Sourcebook, material from I am an Avenger #3 | February 2017 | 978-1302904470 |

== Aftermath ==
Both the Nova and Guardians of the Galaxy series were put on hiatus following the conclusion of "Realm of Kings" and the events in the storyline lead directly into "The Thanos Imperative".

Also the conclusion of Son of Hulk intersects with the end of the back-to-back Hulk storylines "Fall of the Hulks" and "World War Hulks" in the story arc "Dark Son", partly written by Scott Reed.
