= Imperial Guard (Marvel Comics) =

Superhero team

- The cover of Imperial Guard #1 (Jan. 1997). Artwork by Chuck Wojtkiewicz and Ray Snyder.

Publication information
- Publisher: Marvel Comics
- First appearance: X-Men #107 (October 1977)
- Created by: Chris Claremont; Dave Cockrum

In-story information
- Base(s): Chandilar (Shi'ar throneworld)
- Member(s): Gladiator; Oracle; Starbolt; Neutron; Smasher; Flashfire; Warstar; Electron; Manta; Mentor; Titan; Pulsar; Hussar; Nightside; Fang

Roster

The Imperial Guard (the so-called Superguardians) is a superhero team appearing in American comic books published by Marvel Comics. The Imperial Guard are a multi-ethnic group of alien beings who act as enforcers of the laws of the Shi'ar empire; the Superguardians are the personal guard of the leader of the Empire.

Created by writer Chris Claremont and artist Dave Cockrum, the original Imperial Guard characters were pastiches of prominent members of rival publisher DC Comics' superhero team the Legion of Super-Heroes. Many other characters were later added to the roster, not all of whom are based on Legionnaires.

The Imperial Guard first appeared in The Uncanny X-Men #107 (October 1977). Since then, they have been featured periodically in the X-Men titles; crossed paths with the Starjammers, the Kree, the Skrulls, Nova Corps, the Inhumans, and the Guardians of the Galaxy; and been featured in a number of limited series, including Imperial Guard (1997), the War of Kings crossover series (2009), and Realm of Kings: Imperial Guard (2010).

More than 50 Imperial Guard Superguardians have appeared in Marvel Comics' titles; the core members number about 20, with the most notable being Gladiator, Oracle, Starbolt, Neutron, Smasher, Flashfire, Warstar, Electron, Manta, Mentor, Titan, Pulsar, (Note: Not to be confused with the rogue Space Knight Pulsar, introduced in Rom Annual #4 (Dec. 1985).) Hussar, Nightside, and Fang.

== Structure and organization ==
The Imperial Guard numbers about 300 members, and is made up of elite soldiers from throughout the Empire. The Imperial Guard is led by a praetor.

The Superguardians (who comprise the vast majority of the named characters) are the guards of the Shi'ar leader. Those closest to the leader are known as the Royal Elite.

The Guard academy trains replacements called Subguardians for Superguardians who are killed or incapacitated.

=== Imperial Guard oath of allegiance ===
This is the Imperial Guard's oath of allegiance to the Shi'ar empire:

I will not falter, and I will not swerve. From the rising of the suns to the setting of the stars. With Sharra and K'ythri to guide me, I will serve out the term of my duty with courage and conviction, for it is the greatest honor any being of any species can know to be allowed to guard the Imperium of the Shi'ar and stand, each of us, as a light in the darkness. So I make my oath of allegiance.

== Concept and creation ==
As X-Men creators Claremont and Cockrum were devising a team to battle the X-Men in the first part of the Phoenix Saga, Cockrum suggested modeling their powers and costumes after characters from DC's Legion of Super-Heroes. Cockrum previously had a two-year run as artist on the Legion of Super-Heroes backup feature in the Superboy comic book.

In a 2002 interview, Cockrum said that he showed the character designs to Legion writer Paul Levitz. Asked if he thought there might be trouble between the companies, Cockrum said, "Not really... I showed the designs to Paul Levitz, and he didn't say, 'You can't do that.' If anything, he said, 'Geez, these costumes are better than the ones the Legionnaires are wearing.' No, I don't think we ever once thought that we were going to get in trouble over it."

The first Guardsmen introduced (with their Legion of Super-Heroes analog in parentheses) were Gladiator (Superboy), Astra (Phantom Girl), Electron (Cosmic Boy), Fang (Timber Wolf), Hobgoblin (Note: Not to be confused with several supervillains also with the alias of Hobgoblin, commonly depicted as enemies of Spider-Man.) (Chameleon Boy), Impulse (Wildfire), Magic (Princess Projectra), Mentor (Note: Not to be confused with Mentor, the member of the Eternals, father of Thanos and Starfox) (Brainiac 5), Midget (Shrinking Violet), Nightshade (Shadow Lass), Oracle (Saturn Girl), Quasar (Note: Not to be confused with the Marvel character Quasar (Wendell Vaughn), who was introduced shortly thereafter.) (Star Boy), Smasher (Ultra Boy), Starbolt (Sun Boy), Tempest (Lightning Lad), and Titan (Colossal Boy).

Over time, for various reasons, some of the members' code-names were changed: Nightshade to Nightside, Magic to Magique, Midget to Scintilla, Quasar to Neutron, Tempest to Flashfire, and Impulse to Pulsar.

== Fictional team history ==
Many centuries ago, the Phoenix Force entity ends up in Shi'ar space, where it bonds with a citizen of the Empire named Rook'shir. In conjunction with his blade, Rook'shir learns to control the Phoenix Force, but is ultimately overwhelmed by its power, becoming the first known host to succumb to and go insane from its destructive impulses. Becoming the first Dark Phoenix, Rook'shir rampages throughout the Empire, destroying many planets in the process.

T'korr, Majestor of the Shi'ar empire, creates the Imperial Guard to battle Rook'shir; some of the first members are Gladiator, Magic, Mentor, and Quasar. Defeating Rook'shir, the Guard becomes the first line of defense of the Shi'ar empire.

In The X-Men #107 (Oct. 1977), the Shi'ar empire comes into conflict with the X-Men regarding the Phoenix entity, with the Guard battling them at the command of Emperor D'Ken and his sister, the Grand Admiral, Princess Lilandra Neramani.

Some time later during "The Dark Phoenix Saga", the Guardsmen again come into conflict with the X-Men regarding Dark Phoenix, this time at the behest of Lilandra.

The Borderers division is introduced — a group of Guardsman stationed on one of the Shi'ar's conquered worlds to help its governor enforce Shi'ar law. A renegade faction of the Imperial Guard — mainly made up of Borderers, but also including Fang, Hussar, Quasar, and Warstar — become traitors, deciding to serve Lord Samédàr, Deathbird, and the Brood in a conspiracy to overthrow Shi'ar Princess-Majestrix Lilandra. The renegades battle the Guardsman who remain loyal to Lilandra and the X-Men. After defeating the Brood and the renegades, Lilandra resumes her position as the head of the Shi'ar empire. Despite many of the Imperial Guard having joined with Deathbird against Lilandra, most team members are pardoned for their actions, although Quasar, Warstar, Hussar, and Webwing are later banished.

Some time later, Deathbird stages a successful coup and becomes the new Shi'ar Empress. She sends the Imperial Guard to Earth to battle the combined forces of the Starjammers and the superhero team Excalibur, so that she can claim the power of the Phoenix Force for herself. The Guard are forced to retreat when Deathbird realizes the Starjammers are led by Lilandra.

Later, War Skrulls impersonating Charles Xavier and the Starjammers depose Deathbird and restore Lilandra to the throne. Deathbird cedes the empire back to Lilandra as she has grown bored of the bureaucracy.

When the Shi'ar and the Kree wage an intergalactic war, the Imperial Guard are commissioned to lead the fight. The Guard steals the original Captain Marvel's Nega-Bands from his tomb. Using Kree artifacts, including the Bands, the Sh'iar create a massive superweapon, the "Nega-Bomb." Ultimately, the Nega-Bomb device is successfully detonated, killing 98% of all Kree. The Shi'ar annex the remnants of the Kree Empire, with Deathbird becoming viceroy of the Kree territories.

Some time later, the Imperial Guard are informed about a hijacked Shi'ar craft, and join Quasar in a battle against a group of interplanetary marauders known as the Starblasters, who attempt to push the moon away from Earth's orbit.

When many of Earth's heroes vanish (sent to the pocket universe after defeating Onslaught), (Note: Not the member of the Imperial Guard with the same name, who was introduced some years earlier.) Lilandra orders the Imperial Guard to help protect Earth.

Ronan the Accuser leads the Kree in a surprise attack against the Shi'ar, using the Inhumans as an army to disrupt the Shi'ar control of the Kree. Ronan seizes control in a surprise attack. Threatening to destroy the Inhumans' home of Attilan, he orders the Inhumans and their king, Black Bolt, to obey. Ronan compels Karnak, Gorgon, and Triton to covertly join the Imperial Guard, while Black Bolt and Medusa attempt to assassinate Lilandra at a ceremony ratifying an alliance between the Shi'ar and the Spartoi. Black Bolt manages to defeat Ronan in personal combat; the attempt on Lilandra's life fails because the Imperial Guardsman Hobgoblin dies in her place.

Cassandra Nova, in Charles Xavier's body, contacts Majestrix Lilandra, Xavier's lover. Cassandra drives Lilandra insane and uses her to make the Shi'ar fleet destroy the empire. Cassandra forces Lilandra to send the Shi'ar Superguardians to sterilize the entirety of mutantkind, starting with the X-Men. After a battle with the X-Men, the Imperial Guard come to realize Cassandra's treachery and the danger she poses. Jean Grey, using Xavier's consciousness, and with the help of the Imperial Guard, is able to force Cassandra out of Xavier's body and imprison her.

The Imperial Guard's loyalties are tested when Vulcan, a powerful mutant intent on conquering the Shi'ar empire, comes on the scene at the start of the "Emperor Vulcan" storyline. He fights the Guard, killing and wounding a number of them, before he is defeated by Gladiator, who puts out his left eye.

Ultimately, however, Vulcan returns and assumes the Shi'ar throne, and the Imperial Guard are honor-bound to do his bidding. Emperor Vulcan and his fleet battle the Scy'ar Tal, who have devoted their culture and society to the destruction of the Shi'ar empire. After many battles, including Vulcan fighting his brother Havok and the Starjammers, the Shi'ar prevail. Vulcan declares that he will return the Shi'ar empire to its former glory.

Emperor Majestor Vulcan begins to expand the empire, leading to a war with the Kree. Things start off well for the Imperial Guard when they slaughter a cadre of new recruits to the Nova Corps. The Guard follows this by attacking and hospitalizing Ronan the Accuser on his wedding day. The Kree's retaliation leads to the deaths of a number of Guardsmen. Two new Smashers, recruited from the ranks of the Subguardians, die, as does Warstar.

When ordered to kill Lilandra Neramani, Gladiator abandons his post to protect her. Nonetheless, during an attempt to return her to the throne, Lilandra is assassinated.

Vulcan is seemingly killed during a battle with Black Bolt. With no one in line to inherit the throne, civil war threatens the Shi'ar empire. To avoid further conflict, the Imperial Guard's praetor, Gladiator, accepts the offer to become Emperor; Mentor becomes praetor in his place.

During the "Realm of Kings" storyline, the Shi'ar team up with the Starjammers to investigate "The Fault," a space-time anomaly that not only threatens Shi'ar space but all of reality. This crisis leads to another spate of Imperial Guard deaths: Starbolt is killed by a group of mutants from the Cancerverse, and Black Light, Neutron, and Titan are killed in a later battle. The storyline ends with the Guardsmen Mentor and Plutonia choosing to bond with Raptor amulets; Mentor is taken over by Strel and Plutonia becomes the Raptor Kyte; both vanish.

During the "Infinity" storyline, a fourth Smasher is recruited by the Imperial Guard: a human member of the Avengers named Izzy Kane. Receiving an all-points distress signal on Earth, she comes with the Avengers to assist the Shi'ar in fighting off a new threat: the Builders. The Builders threaten all the galactic civilizations, leading the Shi'ar to join forces with the Kree, Skrulls, Spartoi, Brood, and Annihilus' Annihilation Wave to resist them.

After many battles and losses — including the death of Earthquake — the Avengers and Imperial Guard earn a convincing victory against the main Builders' fleet. Mentor helps take command of a Builder World Killer and turn it against the Builders. The Imperial Guard and the Avengers proceed to free the occupied worlds — including Earth, which has fallen to Thanos in their absence. The Imperial Guard helps retake the Peak, the S.W.O.R.D. space station headquarters.

Soon afterward, Gladiator kidnaps the time-displaced incarnation of Jean Grey, placing her on trial for the destruction done by the Phoenix Force years earlier. The All-New X-Men team up with the Guardians of the Galaxy to rescue Jean from the Shi'ar homeworld, but Jean ends up awakening a new power, enabling her to absorb massive amounts of psionic energy and combine her telepathy and telekinesis, which she uses to defeat Gladiator and the Imperial Guard.

When the Shi'ar find out that the reason for the "decay of the universe" is on Earth, they decide to destroy the planet. The Guardians of the Galaxy, Sunspot, A.I.M., and S.H.I.E.L.D.'s Avengers fight back, planning to use a Planetkiller against the Shi'ar. The Planetkiller, however, overheats and explodes, destroyed by Annihilus' Annihilation Wave. The Avengers are ready to meet their end, but the Illuminati intervenes, using the controller disk of a rogue planet that shares the same space with Earth, while Iron Man uses Sol's Hammer to destroy the Shi'ar fleet, including the Imperial Guards.

The Guard are resurrected, along with the rest of the universe, as part of the All-New, All-Different Marvel relaunch.

== Membership ==
=== Core members ===
Code Name (Original name)	Legion of Super-Heroes analog	Powers and abilities	Species	First appearance	Notes
Astra	Phantom Girl	Phasing	Unidentified extraterrestrial race	The Uncanny X-Men #107 (Oct. 1977)	Founding member of the Imperial Guard
Earthquake	—	Geokinesis (psionically create tremors and small quakes on the surface of a planet)	Unidentified extraterrestrial race	The Uncanny X-Men #137 (Sept. 1980)	Killed in Avengers vol. 5 #21 (Dec. 2013)
Earthquake (second version)	—	Geokinesis (psionically create tremors and small quakes on the surface of a planet)	Unidentified extraterrestrial race	Guardians of the Galaxy vol. 5 #1 (Dec. 2012)	
Electron	Cosmic Boy	Magnetism manipulation, projection of bolts of electrical energy	Shi'ar	The Uncanny X-Men #107 (Oct. 1977)	
Fang	Timber Wolf	Superhuman senses, strength, speed, stamina, durability, agility, and reflexes; claws and fangs; teleportation; flight; energy projection/matter manipulation	Lupak	The Uncanny X-Men #107 (Oct. 1977)	Member of the Royal Elite; transformed into one of the Brood and then killed by Wolverine in The Uncanny X-Men #162 (Oct. 1982)
Fang (second version)	Timber Wolf	Superhuman senses, strength, speed, stamina, durability, agility, and reflexes; claws and fangs; teleportation; flight; energy projection/matter manipulation	Lupak	Starjammers #4 (Jan. 1996)	Alter-ego is Nev-Darr
Flashfire (Tempest)	Lightning Lad	Generate and fire bursts of light and electricity	Unidentified extraterrestrial race	The Uncanny X-Men #107 (Oct. 1977)	At one point engaged to marry fellow Guardsman Oracle (an analog of Saturn Girl, to whom Lightning Lad was also romantically linked); alter-ego is Grannz (Lightning Lad's alter-ego is Garth Ranzz); renamed Flashfire because of the DC Comics character Joshua Clay (Tempest)
Gladiator	Superboy (or Mon-El)	Superhuman strength, speed, stamina, agility, reflexes, and durability; psionic abilities; flight	Strontian	The Uncanny X-Men #107 (Oct. 1977)	Commander (praetor) of the Imperial Guard; alter-ego is Kallark
Hobgoblin	Chameleon Boy	Shapeshifting	Chameloid	The Uncanny X-Men #107 (Oct. 1977)	Killed posing as Lilandra Neramani in Inhumans vol. 3 #4 (Oct. 2000)
Hussar	—	Channeling of bioelectricity into other living beings to shock and paralyze	Unidentified extraterrestrial race	The Uncanny X-Men #137 (Sept. 1980)	
Magique (Magic)	Princess Projectra	Ability to create realistic illusions	Shi'ar	The Uncanny X-Men #107 (Oct. 1977)	Killed in Guardians of the Galaxy vol. 2 #15 (June 2009)
Magique (second version)	Princess Projectra	Ability to create realistic illusions	Shi'ar	Guardians of the Galaxy vol. 5 #1 (Dec. 2012)	Replaced the original Magique, who died in Guardians of the Galaxy vol. 2 #15
Manta	—	Infrared and ultraviolet vision, photokinesis	Unidentified extraterrestrial race	The Uncanny X-Men #137 (Sept. 1980)	
Mentor	Brainiac 5	Instantaneous processing of vast amounts of information	Unidentified extraterrestrial race	The Uncanny X-Men #107 (Oct. 1977)	Becomes praetor in War of Kings: Who Will Rule one-shot; taken over by Strel and vanishes at the end of Realm of Kings: Imperial Guard
Neutron (Quasar)	Star Boy	Superhuman strength, stamina, and durability; capable of increasing the mass, density or gravity of an object	Stygian	The Uncanny X-Men #107 (Oct. 1977)	Killed in battle in Realm of Kings: Imperial Guard #5 (May 2010)
Nightside (Nightshade)	Shadow Lass	Ability to tap into the Darkforce Dimension, giving her the ability to conjure absolute darkness within a radius around her or her enemies; displace projectile attacks against her person by opening small apertures into the Darkforce	Unidentified extraterrestrial race	The Uncanny X-Men #107 (Oct. 1977)	Killed in War of Kings #1 (May 2009)
Nightside (second version)	Shadow Lass	Ability to tap into the Darkforce Dimension, giving her the ability to conjure absolute darkness within a radius around her or her enemies; displace projectile attacks against her person by opening small apertures into the Darkforce	Unidentified extraterrestrial race	Avengers vol. 5 #35 (Sept. 2014)	Recruited from the Subguardians to replace the original Nightside, who was killed in War of Kings #1
Oracle	Saturn Girl	Telepathy, mind control, psychic energy projection, psychometry	Shi'ar	The Uncanny X-Men #107 (Oct. 1977)	Long-time member; part of the Royal Elite; alter-ego is Lady Sybil; originally romantically linked with Starbolt; later engaged to marry Tempest/Flashfire
Plutonia	—	Phasing	Unidentified extraterrestrial race	New X-Men #124 (May 2002)	Alter-ego is N'zyr; romantically linked with fellow Guardsman Smasher, then romantically linked with fellow Guardsman Mentor; chose to bond with Raptor amulet at cost of her free will, becoming the Raptor Kyte; current whereabouts unknown
Plutonia	—	Phasing	Unidentified extraterrestrial race	Realm of Kings: Imperial Guard #5 (May 2010)	Added to Imperial Guard after N'zyr became the Raptor Kyte and vanished
Pulsar (Impulse)	Wildfire	Energy being: flight, projection of energy blasts	Unidentified extraterrestrial race	The Uncanny X-Men #107 (Oct. 1977)	Seemingly killed by Vulcan in The Uncanny X-Men #480 (Jan. 2007), but reappears later
Scintilla (Midget)	Shrinking Violet	Shrinking from normal size to five percent of her normal size (and any size in between)	Unidentified extraterrestrial race	The Uncanny X-Men #107 (Oct. 1977)	
Smasher	Ultra Boy	Superhuman strength via cosmic radiation absorption, ability to download additional powers (one at a time) via "Exospex," flight via anti-gravity "flight patches"	Unidentified extraterrestrial race	The Uncanny X-Men #107 (Oct. 1977)	Romantically linked with fellow Guardsman Plutonia; alter-ego is Vril Rokk; killed by Vulcan in The Uncanny X-Men #480 (Jan. 2007)
Smasher	Ultra Boy	Superhuman strength via cosmic radiation absorption, ability to download additional powers (one at a time) via "Exospex," flight via anti-gravity "flight patches"	Unidentified extraterrestrial race	War of Kings #1 (Mar. 2009)	Alter-ego is Salac Tuur; killed by Karnak in War of Kings #1 (May 2009)
Smasher	Ultra Boy	Superhuman strength via cosmic radiation absorption, ability to download additional powers (one at a time) via "Exospex," flight via anti-gravity "flight patches"	Unidentified extraterrestrial race	War of Kings #3 (July 2009)	Killed by Gladiator in War of Kings #3 (July 2009)
Smasher	Ultra Boy	Superhuman strength via cosmic radiation absorption, ability to download additional powers (one at a time) via "Exospex," flight via anti-gravity "flight patches"	Human	Avengers vol. 5 #1 (Feb. 2013)	Alter-ego is Izzy Kane; left the Imperial Guard to return to the Avengers
Smasher	Ultra Boy	Superhuman strength via cosmic radiation absorption, ability to download additional powers (one at a time) via "Exospex," flight via anti-gravity "flight patches"	Unidentified extraterrestrial race	All-New X-Men #23 (Apr. 2014)	Replaced Izzy Kane in the Imperial Guard
Starbolt	Sun Boy or Wildfire	Energy protection	Unidentified extraterrestrial race	X-Men #107 (Oct. 1977)	Originally romantically linked with Oracle; killed in Realm of Kings: Imperial Guard #4 (Apr. 2010)
Titan	Colossal Boy	Expand his body to giant size, superhuman strength and mass	Unidentified extraterrestrial race	The Uncanny X-Men #107 (Oct. 1977)	Killed by a swarm of mutated bugs in Realm of Kings: Imperial Guard #5 (May 2010)
Titan (second version)	Colossal Boy	Expand his body to giant size, superhuman strength and mass	Unidentified extraterrestrial race	TK (sometime during the "Infinity" storyline)	Replaced the first Titan who was killed in Realm of Kings: Imperial Guard #5
Warstar	—	B'nee: electricity generation; C'cil: gigantic, superhuman strength and durability	Two symbiotically linked sentient mechanoids	The Uncanny X-Men #137 (Sept. 1980)	Alter-egos are B'nee and C'cil; their names are an homage to the 1960s animated television program Beany and Cecil; killed (along with the entire Shi'ar fleet) by Iron Man using Sol's Hammer in Avengers vol. 5 #44 (June 2015), resurrected (along with the rest of the universe) in The Ultimates vol. 2 #3 (Mar. 2017)

=== Other members ===
Code Name	Legion of Super-Heroes analog	Powers and abilities	Species	First appearance	Notes
Arc	—	Bio-electrokinesis	Unidentified extraterrestrial race	New X-Men #123 (Apr. 2002)	
Binder	—	Binding objects	Unidentified extraterrestrial race	Rom Annual #4 (Dec. 1985)	Killed by disintegration in Rom Annual #4 (Dec. 1985)
Black Light	—	Dark energy blasts	Shi'ar (mutated)	X-Men: Spotlight on... Starjammers #2 (June 1990)	Twin brother of White Noise; killed in Realm of Kings: Imperial Guard #5 (May 2010)
Blackthorn	—	Botanopathy (Communication with and command of plant life like himself)	Extraterrestrial sentient humanoid plant	The Uncanny X-Men #157 (May 1982)	Member of the Borderers division
Blimp	Bouncing Boy	Bio-helium body contained within a specially constructed space suit	Unidentified extraterrestrial race	New X-Men #124 (May 2002)	
Chakar	—	Flight, superhuman strength and durability	Shi'ar	Rom Annual #4 (Dec. 1985)	Praetor of the Imperial Guard; killed in Rom Annual #4 (Dec. 1985)
Commando	Mon-El	Nega-Radiation that gives him superhuman strength, durability, and intellect	Kree	Imperial Guard #1 (Jan. 1997)	Alter-ego is M'Nell
Cosmo	—	Flight, superhuman strength and durability	Stygian	New X-Men #123 (Apr. 2002)	Killed by Vulcan in The Uncanny X-Men #480 (Jan. 2007)
Delphos	Dream Girl	Precognition	Unidentified extraterrestrial race	Inhumans vol. 3 #3 (Aug. 2000)	
Fader	Invisible Kid	Invisibility	Unidentified extraterrestrial race	New X-Men #124 (May 2002)	
Glom	Matter-Eater Lad	Giant jaws with the ability to bite through and consume all forms of matter	Unidentified extraterrestrial race	Quasar #33 (Apr. 1992)	
God-Killer	—	Telepathy, claws, quills, superhuman strength and durability	The Uncreated	X-Men: Kingbreaker #2 (Mar. 2009)	Recruited by Vulcan to his Praetorians faction of the Imperial Guard; later imprisoned by the Nova Corps for war crimes, and finally transferred to Zan Philo's Corps starship Resolute Duty
G-Type	Wildfire	Project body's intense energy through wrist-mounted flamethrowers	Hodinn	New X-Men #124 (May 2002)	
Hardball	Bouncing Boy	Rubbery body which gives him superhuman durability and leaping power	Unidentified extraterrestrial race	Thor #446 (Apr. 1992)	
Kwill	—	Projection of stun rays	Unidentified extraterrestrial race	Rom Annual #4 (Dec. 1985)	Killed by Tyreseus in Rom Annual #4 (Dec. 1985)
Mammoth	—	Superhuman strength and durability	Unidentified mammoth-like extraterrestrial race	New X-Men #117 (Oct. 2001)	Killed in battle with Cassandra Nova in New X-Men #122 (March 2002)
Monstra	Monstress	Superhuman strength and durability	Unidentified extraterrestrial race	New X-Men #123 (Apr. 2002)	
Moondancer	Dawnstar	Flight, long-range tracking	Unidentified extraterrestrial race	Quasar #33 (Apr. 1992)	Alter-ego is Myla; forced to resign from the Imperial Guard in Quasar #57 (Apr. 1994)
Neosaurus	—	Projection of consciousness from one exo-body form to another	Unidentified extraterrestrial race	New X-Men #124 (May 2002)	
N'rill'irēē	—	Superhuman strength and durability; claws and teeth	Unidentified extraterrestrial race	The Uncanny X-Men #155 (Mar. 1982)	Member of the Borderers division
Onslaught	Karate Kid	Skilled martial artist, superhuman strength	Unidentified extraterrestrial race	Quasar #33 (Apr. 1992)	
Schism	Duo Damsel	Ability to divide into two bodies	Unidentified extraterrestrial race	New X-Men #124 (May 2002)	
Sea Spine	—	Pheromones contained in her upper epidermis that can stun, poison, or incapacitate her opponents	Unidentified extraterrestrial race	The Uncanny X-Men #157 (May 1982)	Member of the Borderers division
Solar Wind	—	Projection of energy blast from chest	Unidentified extraterrestrial race	Quasar #33 (Apr. 1992)	Forced to resign from the Imperial Guard in Quasar #57 (Apr. 1994)
Sp'yxx	—	Large creature with three heads; superhuman strength	Unidentified extraterrestrial race	The Uncanny X-Men #157 (May 1982)	Member of the Borderers division
Squorm	—	Flight	Hive of thousands of vastly intelligent tiny worm-like creatures	New X-Men #123 (Apr. 2002)	
Stuff	—	Shapeshifting	Extraterrestrial bio-computer	New X-Men #123 (Apr. 2002)	
Trypthe	—	Enormous tripod creature with superhuman strength	Unidentified extraterrestrial race	The Uncanny X-Men #157 (May 1982)	Member of the Borderers division
Voltar	—	Razor-sharp blades (possibly replacing hands) with the ability to electrify	Unidentified extraterrestrial race	Realm of Kings: Imperial Guard #1 (Nov. 2009)	Killed while retaking the Imperial shipyards after the war with the Kree in Realm of Kings: Imperial Guard #1 (Nov. 2009)
Voltor	—	Projection of electrical blasts from hands	Unidentified extraterrestrial race	Rom Annual #4 (Dec. 1985)	Killed by Tyreseus in Rom Annual #4 (Dec. 1985)
Voyager	—	Teleportation	Unidentified extraterrestrial race	Quasar #33 (Apr. 1992)	Alter-ego is Divad; forced to resign from the Imperial Guard in Quasar #57 (Apr. 1994)
Webwing	—	Tentacles with sedative excretion, can capture others in body, flight	Unidentified extraterrestrial race	The Uncanny X-Men #157 (May 1982)	Member of the Borderers division
White Noise	—	Sound wave projection and manipulation	Shi'ar	X-Men: Spotlight on... Starjammers #2 (June 1990)	Twin sister of Black Light
Zenith	—	Capability to access and utilize the maximum potential of an energy-wielder's power	Unidentified extraterrestrial race	X-Men: Spotlight on... Starjammers #2 (June 1990)	Brother of Raza Longknife from the Starjammers; killed in X-Men: Spotlight on... Starjammers #2 (June 1990)

== Other versions ==
=== Age of Apocalypse ===
In an alternate reality depicted in the miniseries Age of Apocalypse, Lilandra becomes the Admiral of the Shi'ar Grand Fleet and leader of the Imperial Guard. However, she is killed by her brother D'ken before she can stop him from taking control of the M'Kraan Crystal.

=== Heroes Reborn ===
In an alternate reality depicted in the miniseries "Heroes Reborn", the Imperial Guard is associated with Hyperion and most of its members are infected by the Brood.

=== MC2 ===
An older, alternate reality version of the original Lilandra appears in the MC2 miniseries Last Planet Standing, where she escapes the Shi'ar empire after it is attacked and devoured by Galactus.

== In other media ==
- The Imperial Guard appear in X-Men: The Animated Series and X-Men '97, consisting of Gladiator, Starbolt, Flashfire, Oracle, Smasher, Titan, Hobgoblin, Warstar, Earthquake, Hussar, Astra, Manta, and Vulcan.
- The Imperial Guard appear in the video game Marvel: Ultimate Alliance, consisting of Gladiator, Neutron, Hussar, Starbolt, and Warstar. Several members of the Imperial Guard assisted Deathbird in taking the Shi'ar empire's throne from her sister Lilandra while others refused to take part. Meanwhile, a group of heroes come to obtain a shard of the M'Kraan Crystal and defeat the traitorous guards, Shi'ar soldiers, and Deathbird in the process.
- The Imperial Guard appear in the Christopher L. Bennett novel, X-Men: Watchers on the Walls, consisting of Smasher, Manta, Flashfire, Astra, Nightside, Magique, Blackthorn, N'rill'iree, and Empress Lilandra.

== Reception and characterization ==
Nick Hemming of Looper described the Imperial Guard as perhaps "the most interesting facet of the Shi'ar," describing them as "an elite team of super soldiers who enforce the law within the empire. The Guard has played both friend and foe to Earth's favorite heroes over time, boasting a diverse roster of various species."

== See also ==
- Shi'ar
- Squadron Supreme
- Death Commandos
