= Gladiator (Kallark) =

Kallark Gladiator
- Gladiator as depicted in Guardians of the Galaxy #6 (May 2019). Art by David Marquez.

Publication information
- Publisher: Marvel Comics
- First appearance: The X-Men #107 (Oct. 1977)
- Created by: Chris Claremont; Dave Cockrum

In-story information
- Alter ego: Kallark
- Species: Strontian
- Team affiliations: Imperial Guard; Annihilators; Dark Guardians; Guardians of the Galaxy
- Abilities: Superhuman strength, speed, stamina, agility, reflexes, and durability Psionic abilities Flight

Gladiator (Kallark) is a fictional character appearing in American comic books published by Marvel Comics. He first appeared in The X-Men #107 (Oct. 1977) and was created by writer Chris Claremont and artist Dave Cockrum. The character is a Strontian, and like others of his race has the capacity for great strength and various superpowers, but can only use them when he is completely devoted to a purpose; his abilities vary in accordance with his level of confidence. He was born on Strontia, which is part of the Shi'ar Empire and he is the leader of their Imperial Guard. He was also a member of the Annihilators, Dark Guardians, and Guardians of the Galaxy.

== Publication history ==
Gladiator and the Imperial Guard were created by writer Chris Claremont and artist Dave Cockrum as an homage to DC Comics' Legion of Super-Heroes, with all the Imperial Guard's original members created as analogs of Legionnaires. Gladiator was the analog to Superboy; the name "Gladiator" was a conscious homage to the Philip Wylie novel Gladiator (1930) on which Superman was allegedly partially based. Gladiator's name, Kallark, is a combination of Superman's Kryptonian and human names: Kal-El and Clark Kent.

The character first appeared in The Uncanny X-Men #107 (Oct. 1977). Since then, he has been periodically featured in X-titles, Fantastic Four, Rom the Spaceknight, Silver Surfer, Nova, and New Warriors. His origin was revealed in War of Kings: Warriors #1 (2009).

He has played important roles in some of Marvel's major storylines, such as Operation: Galactic Storm (1992), Maximum Security (2001), and War of Kings (2009). During the Heroes Reborn era (1997), he starred in the three-issue Imperial Guard miniseries.

Following the conclusion of The Thanos Imperative, Gladiator has appeared as a member of the titular team in Annihilators #1-4 (March–June 2011) and Annihilators: Earthfall #1-4 (Sept.-Dec. 2011).

== Fictional character biography ==
Gladiator battles the Fantastic Four on the cover of Fantastic Four #249 (Dec. 1982). Art by John Byrne.

Kallark is a member of the Strontian race, and was born under Shi'ar rule. All Strontians are born with the capacity for great strength and various superpowers, but can only use them when they are completely devoted to a purpose. Fearing a Strontian rebellion, the Shi'ar emperor ordered Kallark, among other Strontians, to kill the Strontian elders. Only Kallark was devoted enough to carry out the order, and the others were killed when their wavering commitment rendered them weak. As a reward for his actions, Kallark is named the Praetor (leader) of the Shi'ar Imperial Guard.

When the X-Men come into conflict with the Shi'ar empire regarding the Phoenix entity, Gladiator battles them first at the command of Emperor D'Ken, and then at the behest of D'Ken's successor, Empress Lilandra Neramani. He later aids the X-Men against several renegade Imperial Guardsmen serving Shi'ar traitor Lord Samedar.\

While pursuing a band of shape-changing Skrulls, Gladiator arrives on Earth and mistakenly attacks the Fantastic Four. With the aid of Spider-Man and Captain America, the real Skrulls are exposed and captured. Meanwhile, Lilandra's sister Deathbird stages a coup and becomes the new Shi'ar Empress.

When many of Earth's heroes vanish after defeating Onslaught, Lilandra (who has resumed control of the Shi'ar) orders Gladiator and many of the Imperial Guard to help protect Earth. He later aids the X-Men again during an encounter with Galactus.

At the request of Lilandra, Gladiator returns to Earth to capture the Uni-Power for evaluation. Gladiator invites the Uni-Power to return to the Shi'ar empire as their guest. Although the Uni-Power agrees, it is captured en route by Krosakis, an energy-leeching warlord. Gladiator attempts to stop Krosakis but fails, with Krosakis being beaten by the Silver Surfer.

Gladiator is commanded to stop the conqueror Vulcan, who is determined to destroy the Shi'ar empire as revenge for the death of his mother. Gladiator captures and delivers Vulcan to a Shi'ar prison facility. Vulcan escapes prison with a group of Shi'ar rebels and leads a coup against Lilandra, becoming emperor of the Shi'ar. After Vulcan and Lilandra are killed, Gladiator becomes the emperor of the Shi'ar to avoid further conflict over succession. Following the war with the Cancerverse, Gladiator joins the Annihilators.

Gladiator's son, Kubark, also known as Kid Gladiator, is sent to Earth with bodyguard Warbird (Ava'Dara Naganandini) as a punishment and is enrolled in the Jean Grey School For Higher Learning.

In the aftermath of the "Infinity Wars" storyline, Gladiator and the Shi'ar empire arrive to save everyone after they were ejected from a hole in the space station following the Black Order stealing Thanos' body during the funeral. Gladiator joins Starfox's Dark Guardians.

== Powers and abilities ==
Gladiator possesses a number of superhuman capabilities as a result of his unique alien physiology including superhuman strength (capable of shattering a planet, ripping apart a black hole, and holding off the Destroyer armor), superhuman speed, stamina and durability (capable of withstanding the heat emitted from the Phoenix Force, a blast comparable to the full power of Odin, direct attacks from Thor and Mjolnir, point blank planetary explosions, and an explosion equivalent to a supernova), reflexes, microscopic and telescopic vision, X-ray vision, heat vision (stated as "hotter than a star"); super-breath, "frost breath", super-hearing (capable of hearing sounds from light years away in space), a regenerative healing factor, psionic resistance (capable of withstanding mental attacks from telepaths to a certain degree), and warp speed flight (measured as "a hundred times the speed of light", and shown moving across galaxies before Heimdall could blink). Gladiator's abilities increase and decrease in accordance with his level of confidence and he is vulnerable to a certain form of rare radiation. Gladiator also has advanced longevity, having survived for centuries with very little aging.

== In other media ==
=== Television ===
- Gladiator appears in X-Men: The Animated Series, voiced initially by Richard Epcar, and later by Raymond O'Neill.
- Gladiator appears in the X-Men '97 episode "Lifedeath - Part 2", voiced by David Errigo Jr.

=== Video games ===
- Gladiator appears as a boss in Marvel: Ultimate Alliance, voiced by Dave Wittenberg.
- Gladiator appears as a playable character in Marvel: Future Fight.
- Gladiator appears as a playable character in Marvel Contest of Champions.
