= Ultimate Galactus Trilogy =

Collection of three comic book limited series published by Marvel Comics

- Cover of Ultimate Extinction 1 (Mar, 2006), art by Brandon Peterson
- Created by: Warren Ellis

Publication information
- Publisher: Ultimate Marvel imprint of Marvel Comics
- Schedule: Monthly
- Title(s): Ultimate Nightmare; Ultimate Secret; Ultimate Extinction
- Formats: Original material for the series has been published as a set of limited series.
- Genre: Superhero
- Publication date: Ultimate Nightmare; October 2004 — February 2005; Ultimate Secret; May — December 2005; Ultimate Extinction; March — July 2006
- Number of issues: Ultimate Nightmare: 5 Ultimate Secret: 4 Ultimate Extinction: 5
- Main character(s): Gah Lak Tus; Silver Surfer; Nick Fury; Fantastic Four; Ultimates; Mahr Vehl; X-Men

Creative team
- Writer(s): Warren Ellis
- Artist(s): Ultimate Extinction; Brandon Peterson
- Penciller(s): Ultimate Nightmare; Trevor Hairsine (1-2, 4-5); Steve Epting (3); Ultimate Secret; Steve McNiven (1-2); Tom Raney (3-4)
- Inker(s): Ultimate Nightmare; Simon Coleby (1-2, 4); Nelson DeCastro (2-5); Tom Palmer Sr. (3-4); Mark Morales (4); Rodney Ramos (4); Ultimate Secret; Mark Morales (1-2); Scott Hanna (3-4)
- Letterer(s): Chris Eliopoulos
- Colorist(s): Ultimate Nightmare; Frank D'Armata; Ultimate Secret; Morry Jay Hollowell (1-2); Rob Schwager (3-4); Ultimate Extinction; Paul Mounts (1); Justin Ponsor (1-5); Jason Keith (5)
- Editor(s): Ultimate Nightmare; Jennifer Grünwald; Nick Lowe; Ralph Macchio; Joe Quesada; Jeff Youngquist; Ultimate Secret; Nick Lowe; Ralph Macchio; John Barber; Nicole Wiley; Ultimate Extinction; John Barber; Ralph Macchio; Nicole Wiley; Joe Quesada

Reprints
- Collected editions
- Hardcover: ISBN 0-7851-2139-0

The Ultimate Galactus Trilogy is a collection of three comic book limited series published by Marvel Comics. All three series are set in the Ultimate Marvel universe and are written by Warren Ellis. The series showcase the arrival of the planet-eating entity Gah Lak Tus on Earth.

== Publication history ==
Published from August 2004 to May 2006, the three series were titled Ultimate Nightmare (#1 - 5, Oct. 2004 - Feb. 2005), Ultimate Secret (#1 - 4, May - Dec. 2005), and Ultimate Extinction (#1 - 5, Mar. - July 2006). They were all written by Warren Ellis.

Ultimate Nightmare is a five-issue comic book limited series. Issues 1, 2, 4 and 5 were penciled by Trevor Hairsine and inked by Simon Coleby. The third issue was drawn by Steve Epting. Ellis notes that "Ultimate Nightmare was originally intended as a set-up for a big Ultimate-line event that Mark Millar was going to do. Mark, however, has had health issues for some time, and that and his workload led to him bowing out and me once again being asked to step in and help out. And then, while I was getting into Nightmare, Joe Quesada had the idea of turning this event into a trilogy...So I needed to come up with a credible second step in the trilogy fairly quickly."

Ultimate Secret is a four-issue comic book limited series with art by Steve McNiven.

Ultimate Extinction is a five-issue comic book limited series began in January 2006, cover dated March, and was illustrated by Brandon Peterson.

== Plot ==
=== Ultimate Nightmare ===
A broadcast disrupts the world's communications systems, filling televisions and computer monitors with images of death and destruction that cause thousands of people to commit suicide. The broadcast ripples across the psychic plane, and attracts the attention of S.H.I.E.L.D. and Charles Xavier, with both tracing the source to the Tunguska wasteland in Russia, the site of a massive comet crash over a century ago. S.H.I.E.L.D. Commander Nick Fury leads a team of heroes - Captain America, Black Widow and Sam "Falcon" Wilson - on a reconnaissance mission, while Professor X sends the X-Men Jean Grey, Wolverine and Colossus to investigate. Neither team is aware of the other's involvement.

The two teams trace the signal to an abandoned complex built in the era of the Soviet Union and encounter an army of mutated humans, all engineered by a now-defunct Soviet super-soldier project designed to create versions of Captain America. Two characters who make appearances, though unnamed, are Ultimate Unicorn and an Ultimate version of Red Guardian. After defeating the humans the two teams meet, with Fury's team capturing the X-Men and then discovering the source of the broadcast - a sentient, self-repairing robot called Vision. Vision explains that it traveled to Earth 100 years ago, and when its ship malfunctioned it crashed in Tunguska and was later captured by the Soviets, who amputated portions of its body and grafted them onto Soviet Army volunteers to create experimental super-soldiers. Vision has repaired itself enough to communicate with the world and warns Fury of an impending threat: the Eater of Worlds called Gah Lak Tus. The X-Men subsequently escape and Fury's team takes the Vision back to S.H.I.E.L.D for further analysis.

The cover of Ultimate Extinction #5 (July 2006), featuring the Gah Lak Tus swarm. Cover art by Brandon Peterson

=== Ultimate Secret ===
A secret S.H.I.E.L.D. installation in New Mexico investigating revolutionary methods of space travel is attacked by the alien Kree. This forces resident scientist Dr. Philip Lawson to change to his true identity of Captain Mahr Vehl and battle the attackers. Although able to successfully defend the installation, Mahr Vehl is rendered unconscious and is eventually questioned by Fury. Mahr Vehl explains he is a member of the Kree himself, and that they have been observing Earth to determine if humanity poses a threat to the Kree in the larger galaxy. Observing mankind's violent nature, Mahr Vehl reveals that the Kree have recently decided to confine humanity on Earth until the entity Gah Lak Tus can destroy them, thus ending the potential threat. Realizing that other Kree will be coming and that the threat the Vision foretold is now very real, Fury summons the Fantastic Four and the Ultimates.

A Kree force attacks the installation soon after but is stopped by a combined team of heroes. Another team of heroes - with Mahr Vehl's aid - storms the Kree ship while the aliens are on Earth. The commander, Yahn Rgg, activates the self-destruct mechanism, but not before Mahr Vehl hacks into the ship's database and downloads its contents into his memory banks. With the information gained from both Vision and the Kree, Fury contemplates how to deal with the coming threat of Gah Lak Tus.

=== Ultimate Extinction ===
Fury enlists the aid of Reed Richards and Professor Xavier once Silver Surfer arrives to "herald" the approach of Gah Lak Tus, who is discovered to be a swarm of thousands of sentient ships stretched 100,000 miles (160,000 km) long and within only a week's journey from Earth.

The heroes Captain America, Falcon, Iron Man and Mahr Vehl have several battles with Gah Lak Tus' heralds, the Silver Men, and allow Reed Richards, Charles Xavier and Jean Grey time to develop a plan. Xavier and Grey make psychic contact with Gah Lak Tus, which completely repulses the entity and distracts it. Richards then uses a weapon known as the "Nevada gun" and teleports the latent energy of a Big Bang into the heart of the Gah Lak Tus swarm. With 20% of its mass destroyed by the blast, the entity retreats. Richards then programs Vision with plans for the weapon and sends it into space, in the hopes that other races will be able to benefit and fend off Gah Lak Tus. Nick Fury's only comment on the matter is "the human race can kick the hell out of anything."

== Collected editions ==
The series has been collected into a number of volumes:

- Ultimate Galactus Trilogy (368 pages, hardcover, Marvel Comics, ISBN 0-7851-2139-0, softcover, June 2009, ISBN 0-7851-3722-X) collects:
  - Ultimate Nightmare (120 pages, Marvel Comics, March 2005, ISBN 0-7851-1497-1, Panini Comics, December 2006, ISBN 1-905239-55-6)
  - Ultimate Secret (96 pages, Marvel Comics, January 2006, ISBN 0-7851-1660-5, Panini Comics, December 2006, ISBN 1-905239-51-3)
  - Ultimate Extinction (120 pages, Marvel Comics, August 2006, ISBN 0-7851-1496-3, Panini Comics, December 2006, ISBN 1-905239-54-8)
