= Mahr Vehl =

Captain Mahr Vehl
- Promotional cover to Ultimate Secret #2 (May 2005); Art by Steve McNiven.

Publication information
- Publisher: Marvel Comics (Ultimate Marvel)
- First appearance: Ultimate Secret #1 (March 2005)
- Created by: Warren Ellis, Steve McNiven

In-story information
- Full name: Geheneris Hala`son Mahr Vehl
- Species: Kree
- Team affiliations: S.H.I.E.L.D. Kree Empire
- Notable aliases: Doctor Philip Lawson
- Abilities: Genius-level intellect; Expertise in physics and engineering; Implanted Kree combat suit granting: Superhuman strength, speed, and durability: Energy shields and projection; Weapon morphing; Mode shifting; Invisibility; Flight; Skilled hand-to-hand combatant

Geheneris Hala´son Mahr Vehl (also known as Mahr Vehl) is a character appearing in American comic books published by Marvel Comics. Created by writer Warren Ellis and penciller Steve McNiven, the character first appeared in Ultimate Secret #1 (March 2005). Mahr Vehl appears in the Ultimate Marvel universe and is the Ultimate version of Mar-Vell.

== Fictional character biography ==
Mahr Vehl is a member of the Kree, an alien race. He is a "Pluskommander"—an equivalent to captain—in the Kree's interstellar fleet, the Kree Void Navy. Mahr Vehl is also a member of the Halason family, who according to Kree religion are God's chosen. Mahr Vehl denies this view and insists that his ancestor, Hala, was not a god—rather simply a man who believed that all that innocent life was worth saving. Initially a spy sent to Earth to prevent humans from developing interstellar travel, Mahr Vehl abandons his mission and adopts the identity of physicist Philip Lawson. Under this guise, Mahr Vehl aids in an interstellar engineering program in New Mexico.

When the Kree attack the installation, Mahr Vehl is forced to reveal himself and battle the attackers. Although able to successfully defend the installation, Mahr Vehl is rendered unconscious and is eventually questioned by Nick Fury. Mahr Vehl explains he is a member of the Kree himself, and that they have been observing Earth to determine if humanity is a threat to the Kree. Observing mankind's violent nature, Mahr Vehl reveals that the Kree have decided to confine humanity on Earth until the entity Gah Lak Tus can destroy them, ending the potential threat.

Another Kree force attacks the installation soon after, but is stopped by a combined team of superheroes. Another team of heroes—with Mahr Vehl's aid—storm the Kree ship while the aliens are on Earth. The commander, Yahn Rgg, activates the self-destruct mechanism, but not before Mahr Vehl hacks into the ship's database and downloads its contents into his memory banks. Mahr Vehl later aids the heroes against the "heralds" of Gah Lak Tus, the Silver Surfers. Mahr Vehl is wounded in battle, but this diversionary action gives Mister Fantastic time to use the Ultimate Nullifier, which repels Gah Lak Tus. Mahr Vehl chooses to remain on Earth, and is given the title of "Captain" by Fury.

Mahr Vehl is under the control of the Titan Thanos when he comes into possession of the Cosmic Cube.

In the mini-series Hunger, Mahr-Vehl sacrifices himself to destroy a "merged" Galactus with a nuclear weapon.

== Powers and abilities ==
Mahr Vehl's body has been implanted with a green and white cybernetic battle suit that can be activated by a device located on his wrist (which takes the appearance of a wristwatch when he is in human form). The battlesuit flares with bio-electric energy and provides Mahr Vehl with increased strength, increased healing, speed, flight, invisibility, phasing, the ability to view the entire light spectrum, the capability to create energy shields, and the power to project energy blasts via the totalkannon on his left forearm. In later appearances, Mahr Vehl's armor suit shows other special capabilities such as shape shifting and armor expansion, causing him to bulk up into a larger, stronger physical form along with greater energy projection fired from both arms instead of just the armor control dial. They can also project massive gunnery.

== Reception ==
=== Critical reception ===
Darby Harn of Screen Rant included Mahr Vehl in their "15 Most Powerful Versions Of Captain Marvel From The Comics" list. CBR.com ranked Mahr Vehl 8th in their "Every Version Of Captain Marvel" list, and 11th in their "Every Captain Marvel Ever" list.

== In other media ==
- Elements of Mahr Vehl are incorporated into The Avengers: Earth's Mightiest Heroes' incarnation of Mar-Vell (voiced by Roger Craig Smith). He possesses Mahr Vehl's appearance, human identity of Philip Lawson, shapeshifting weaponry, and status as a blue Kree.
- Mahr Vehl appears as an alternate costume for Genis-Vell in Marvel: Ultimate Alliance.
