= Sentry (Kree) =

Marvel villain

- Sentry-459 as depicted in Marvel Super-Heroes #13 (March 1968). Art by Gene Colan.

Publication information
- Publisher: Marvel Comics
- First appearance: Fantastic Four #64 (July 1967)
- Created by: Stan Lee (writer); Jack Kirby (artist)

In story information
- Type: Robot
- Element of stories featuring: Kree

Sentry is a fictional character appearing in American comic books published by Marvel Comics. The character was created by Stan Lee and Jack Kirby in July 1967. It is one of a series of giant humanoid robots called Kree Sentries built by the Kree. The most prominent Sentry, Sentry-459, is an enemy of the Fantastic Four and Captain Marvel.

Sentry-459 has also appeared in animated adaptations. It appeared in Fantastic Four, voiced by Mark Hamill, and a self-titled episode of The Avengers: Earth's Mightiest Heroes.

== Publication history ==
The Kree Sentries first appeared in Fantastic Four #64 (July 1967) and were created by Stan Lee and Jack Kirby.

== Fictional character biography ==
=== Sentry-459 ===
The Sentries' main purpose is to stand guard over military outposts and depots throughout the Kree empire. Sentry-459 accompanies a Kree scientific party who journey to Earth to experiment on sub-humans, which eventually results in the creation of the Inhumans. When the Kree leave Earth, Sentry-459 remains to monitor Inhuman progress, with the Kree intending to use them as a militia force. Sentry-459 remains inert until it is inadvertently activated by the Fantastic Four, who battle it to a standstill. Considering itself defeated when the Fantastic Four escape, the Sentry sends a signal to the Kree alerting them to the presence of superhumans on Earth before deactivating itself. The Kree Ronan the Accuser investigates the signal and battles the Fantastic Four soon after.

The U.S. Army transports the Sentry to Cape Canaveral, where it is reactivated by Yon-Rogg, a Kree colonel and the leader of an expedition investigating Earth. Yon-Rogg attempts to use the Sentry to kill his subordinate Mar-Vell, who manages to defeat it.

Ronan the Accuser later reactivates the Sentry and uses it in an attempt to reverse the course of evolution on Earth, but it is defeated by Mar-Vell. Kree agents attempt to retrieve the Sentry, but are driven off by S.H.I.E.L.D. The Sentry is later activated by the Super-Adaptoid, who recruits it into his team Heavy Metal in a bid to destroy the Avengers. The Sentry returns in the Blackwulf series, having been found by Ultron and recruited into his Underground Legion. It is eventually destroyed in battle.

=== Other Kree Sentries ===
==== Sentry-9168 ====
Another Sentry - Sentry-9168 - is encountered by the Fantastic Four on the Moon. This Sentry is smaller than traditional Sentries, being the size of a human, and is programmed to protect the remains of a hidden Kree city on the Moon. The Fantastic Four battle and destroy the Sentry via a remote destruct mechanism.

==== Sentry-213 ====
Sentry-213 is a 30-foot (9.1 m) tall Sentry stationed in an unmanned supply depot/surveillance post on Uranus. It is destroyed by a group of Eternals led by Uranos, sparking a war with the Kree.

==== Sentry-372 ====
This Sentry only appears once, and battles several members of the Imperial Guard before being damaged by the West Coast Avengers. The Sentry self-destructs and destroys the outpost it was guarding.

==== Sentry-571 ====
Sentry-571 aided the Kree when their Lunatic Legion attacked Earth. It was defeated by Iron Man.

== In other media ==
=== Television ===
- Sentry-459 appears in the Fantastic Four episode "The Sentry Sinister", voiced by Mark Hamill.
- The Kree Sentries appear in the Fantastic Four: World's Greatest Heroes episode "Trial by Fire". These versions are floating spherical robots.
- The Kree Sentries and Sentry-459 appear in The Avengers: Earth's Mightiest Heroes. This version of Sentry-459 was created to assess Earth's inhabitants and is equipped with a Nega-Bomb.
- The Kree Sentries appear in the Avengers Assemble episode "Captain Marvel".

=== Video games ===
- A Kree Sentry appears as an assist character in Avengers in Galactic Storm.
- Kree Sentries appear in Marvel: Avengers Alliance Tactics.
- A Kree Sentry appears in Marvel: Avengers Alliance 2.
- Sentry-459 appears in Lego Marvel Super Heroes 2.
- A Kree Sentry appears in Marvel's Avengers. It is initially buried underneath San Francisco Bay before the Avengers unknowingly unearth it using their Helicarrier's Terrigen crystal power source. Five years later, MODOK activates and merges with the Sentry to kill the Avengers, only to be defeated by Kamala Khan. Following the battle, the Sentry launches a beacon into space.
