= Varra (comics) =

Marvel Comics character

Publication information
- Publisher: Marvel Comics
- First appearance: New Avengers vol. 4 #4 (December 2015)
- Created by: Al Ewing; Gerardo Sandoval

In-story information
- Alter ego: Varra
- Species: Skrull / Kree hybrid
- Team affiliations: Knights of the Infinite; Kree / Skrull Empire
- Notable aliases: Varra
- Abilities: Shapeshifting

Varra is a character appearing in American comic books published by Marvel Comics. Created by writer Al Ewing and artist Gerardo Sandova, the character first appeared in New Avengers vol. 4 #4 (December 2015). Varra was a hybrid of Skrull and Kree descent. She is a member of the Knights of the Infinite, a group of hybrids striving to bring the Kree and Skrull empires together.

Charlayne Woodard portrays Varra in the Marvel Cinematic Universe miniseries Secret Invasion, where she is depicted as Nick Fury's wife Priscilla Davis.

== Publication history ==
Varra debuted in New Avengers vol. 4 #4 (December 2015), and was created by Al Ewing and Gerardo Sandoval. She appeared in the 2020 Empyre: Aftermath Avengers #1 one-shot.

== Fictional character biography ==
Varra is one of the Knights of the Infinite, a group of Skrull-Kree hybrids tasked with uniting their species' empires. She faced the extra-dimensional sorcerer Moridun, and almost died during the battle before being rescued. Hulkling later healed her using magic.

== In other media ==
Varra appears in Secret Invasion, portrayed by Charlayne Woodard. This version is a pureblooded Skrull and Nick Fury's wife.
