= Yon-Rogg =

Marvel Comics supervillain

- Yon-Rogg as depicted in Avengers NOW! #1 (December 2014)

Publication information
- Publisher: Marvel Comics
- First appearance: Marvel Super-Heroes #12 (December 1967)
- Created by: Stan Lee; Gene Colan

In-story information
- Species: Kree
- Notable aliases: Colonel Yon-Rogg; Magnitron
- Abilities: Kree physiology granting superhuman strength, durability, and resistance to toxins and poisons; Concussive blasts of photon energy projection; Trained in armed and unarmed combatant

Yon-Rogg is a character appearing in American comic books published by Marvel Comics. Created by Stan Lee and Gene Colan, the character first appeared in Marvel Super Heroes #12 (December 1967). Yon-Rogg is a military commander of the Kree alien race who was sent to Earth on behalf of the Supreme Intelligence, in order to promote Kree genetic superiority. The character is a foe of Carol Danvers and was indirectly responsible for her transformation into Ms. Marvel.

Jude Law portrayed the character in the Marvel Cinematic Universe film Captain Marvel (2019). Law also voiced an alternate version of the character in the animated series What If...?.

== Publication history ==
Yon-Rogg first appeared in Marvel Super Heroes #12 (December 1967) and was created by Stan Lee and Gene Colan. He was introduced as a Kree commander sent to Earth to investigate how the planet's seemingly primitive inhabitants managed to destroy an advanced Kree Sentry. During this mission, he tried to kill Captain Marvel (Mar-Vell) out of jealousy and who was in a relationship with another Kree called Una. His schemes ended in Una dying, which resulted in animosity between the two.

Yon-Rogg later attempted to defeat his nemesis by kidnapping Carol Danvers and using her as a hostage. He was seemingly killed when a Kree device, a Psyche-Magnitron, exploded. That same explosion also awoke Carol's latent genetic potential, transforming her into the superhero Ms. Marvel. He returned years later as Magnitron, to enact revenge on Carol, who then known as Captain Marvel. Yon-Rogg attempted to telepathically torture Carol and destroy New York City. He was defeated once again, although it cost Carol her memories.

== Fictional character biography ==
Yon-Rogg is a Kree military officer who is the commander of the Helion, a Kree spaceship that was sent to Earth by the Supreme Intelligence. Yon-Rogg had a deep hatred towards Mar-Vell, his subordinate, due to his love for the Kree medic Una. He ends up leaving Mar-Vell on Earth so that Una can be his. Yon-Rogg later unleashes the Kree Sentry to dispose of Mar-Vell. During his fight with the Sentry, Mar-Vell learned that the Sentry attacking him was sent by Yon-Rogg. After Mar-Vell defeats the Kree Sentry, Yon-Rogg contacts Ronan the Accuser to pass judgement on Mar-Vell's actions. Ronan declines the offer stating that the mission was not jeopardized by Mar-Vell's actions.

Yon-Rogg makes multiple attempts to kill Mar-Vell and his acquaintance Carol Danvers. After Una dies from her injuries upon being caught in the crossfire between the Kree and the Aakons, Zo frees Mar-Vell from the control bands that Yon-Rogg put on him, and has Mar-Vell go after Yon-Rogg. While a supply ship is restocking the Kree ship, Mar-Vell ends having a brief fight with Yon-Rogg before returning to Earth to save Carol from Man-Slayer.

Mar-Vell meets Rick Jones, who uses his Nega Bands to battle Yon-Rogg. Yon-Rogg manages to escape afterwards. Yon-Rogg begins his next plot against Mar-Vell. When Yon-Rogg captures Carol Danvers and Mar-Vell catches up to him, Yon-Rogg uses a Psyche-Magnitron to create a Kree Mandroid to help him fight Mar-Vell. During the fight, Carol is injured and the Psyche-Magnitron is damaged, releasing energy that infuses her with Mar-Vell's Kree abilities.

Yon-Rogg is later revealed to have survived the Psyche-Magnitron's explosion. He gained a telepathic link with Carol via a shard of the Magnitron that was lodged in her brain, creating a brain-damaging lesion. After stealing the remains of the Psyche-Magnitron from Carol, Yon-Rogg tries to give it to the Kree empire, only to be turned down. He then takes the name Magnitron and uses Carol's memories and its power to recreate enemies from her past before attempting to drop a Kree city on top of New York City. Carol destroys the telepathic link and Yon-Rogg's powers by aggravating the lesion in her head until it bursts, though at the cost of all her memories.

A flashback series shows Yon-Rogg's association with Mar-Vell and Una. The three are part of a Kree mission deep into Brood territory. Their mission is to rescue or terminate a Kree general who knows valuable military intelligence. Yon-Rogg earns the thanks of the Shi'ar ruler and the Imperial Guard when the Kree rescue them from Skrull attackers. The Kree move on and find the general. A Brood attack leaves Mar-Vell, Una and Yon-Rogg stranded for weeks; this is after Mar-Vell risks his life to save Yon-Rogg. The three are rescued by the same Shi'ar they previously saved.

== Powers and abilities ==
Yon-Rogg possesses superhuman strength, durability, and resistance to toxins and poisons, owing to his Kree physiology. He can also project concussive blasts of photon energy from his hands. Additionally, the character is skilled in unarmed combat.

== Other versions ==
- Yahn Rgg, an alternate universe version of Yon-Rogg from Earth-1610, appears in Ultimate Secret #4.
- An alternate universe version of Yon-Rogg from Earth-9997 appears in Universe X #0.

== In other media ==
=== Television ===
Yon-Rogg appears in The Avengers: Earth's Mightiest Heroes, voiced by Fred Tatasciore.

=== Marvel Cinematic Universe ===
Jude Law as Yon-Rogg in the 2019 film Captain Marvel.

Yon-Rogg appears in media set in the Marvel Cinematic Universe (MCU), portrayed by Jude Law. This version is the leader of Starforce and Carol Danvers' mentor who leads the Kree's war against the Skrulls.

- Yon-Rogg first appears in the live-action film Captain Marvel (2019).
- An alternate timeline variant of Yon-Rogg appears in the What If...? animated series episode "What If... Nebula Joined the Nova Corps?" (2023), voiced by Law.

=== Video games ===
Yon-Rogg / Magnitron appears as an unlockable playable character and boss in Lego Marvel's Avengers via the "Classic Captain Marvel Pack" DLC.
