= Kree =

Aliens in the Marvel Universe

- Some of the most notable Kree. Art by Scott Kolins.

Publication information
- Publisher: Marvel Comics
- First appearance: Fantastic Four #65 (August 1967)
- Created by: Stan Lee (writer); Jack Kirby (artist)

Characteristics
- Place of origin: Hala (destroyed); later moved to Kree-Lar
- Notable members: See Known Kree
- Inherent abilities: Kree have a higher strength level than that of a human, and require more nitrogen to breathe comfortably

The Kree, briefly known as the Ruul, are an alien race appearing in American comic books published by Marvel Comics. They are native to the planet Hala in the Large Magellanic Cloud, and have a scientifically and technologically advanced militaristic society.

The Kree have appeared throughout the Marvel Cinematic Universe, in the television series Agents of S.H.I.E.L.D. and the films Guardians of the Galaxy, Captain Marvel and The Marvels.

== Publication history ==
The first on-panel appearance of the Kree was in Fantastic Four #65 (August 1967), and they were created by Jack Kirby and Stan Lee. In their first appearance, the Supreme Intelligence sent Ronan to Earth to investigate what happened to a Kree Sentry, who was destroyed by the Fantastic Four in the previous issue.

The Kree made their first major appearances in the first volume of Captain Marvel, who was introduced as a Kree warrior who is sent to Earth to spy on its inhabitants in Marvel Super-Heroes #12. The following issue would also see the debut of the Yon-Rogg and Carol Danvers a Human/Kree hybrid, who is the seventh and current Captain Marvel. Including Supreme Intelligence, Ronan the Accuser and Doctor Minerva, all of them would feature in the original run of Captain Marvel.

The Kree were one of the major factions involved in the 1971's Kree–Skrull War storyline, the event ran in the first volume of the Avengers. The storyline established the war between the Kree and Skrulls, it involves other groups like Avengers, the Inhumans, and the Fantastic Four. It included several plotlines interwoven around the return of Mar-Vell.

They also featured in the first ongoing series of the Inhumans, in which it is established that ancient Kree experimented on ancient humans, which resulted in a superpowered offshoot of humanity. The Kree ultimately abandoned their test subjects, and the Inhumans went on to create their own kingdom far away from humanity. The Kree appear in #18–19 of the first Ms. Marvel run. It was also originally planned that Danvers would be artificially impregnated by the Supreme Intelligence.

The conflict between the Kree and Skrull Empire continued in the pages of the third Silver Surfer volume. They returned in the Avengers storyline Operation Galactic Storm, a thematic sequel to Kree–Skrull War, the Kree Empire was at war with the Shi'ar empire, who were introduced in the Uncanny X-Men. The event introduced the Starforce team.

== Biology ==
True Kree resemble humans almost exactly, with the exception of blue skin, different visual systems, and "duplicates" of several internal organs. Kree have a higher strength level than that of a human, and require more nitrogen to breathe comfortably. Kree bodies are adapted to environmental characteristics on Hala that are unlike Earth. Hala has higher gravity and a higher concentration of nitrogen in the atmosphere than Earth. Under Earth's lesser gravity, their strength and speed increase. However, they cannot breathe in Earth's atmosphere without using a chemical "breathing formula" or artificial life-support devices.

The original Kree had blue-colored skin, but a second racial group with pink skin resembling that of human Caucasians emerged over the millennia. The blue, "purebred" Kree have become a small, but powerful, minority. Pink Kree are more durable than blue Kree.

Adult Kree range (typically) between 5 and 8 feet (1.5 and 2.4 m) tall. Some female Kree can physically influence men, and a few can even drain the life force of others. Most are born with this ability, but are required to have it surgically 'corrected' upon adulthood. They must undergo this procedure when they are adults in order to avoid 'frying' their brains. It seems that this procedure is analogous to female genital mutilation and it is also called "psychological mutilation" as witnessed with Una-Rogg.

Just like humans, some Kree also suffer from various diseases such as Blackgorge, Betath's Plague, the Wasting, and cancer, which they call Blackend.

The Kree were an evolutionarily stagnant race. This was due to a single member of the Kree race attempting to gain control of The Crystal of Ultimate Vision. This unnamed Kree found the crystal, but attempted to use it to become akin to a god, with powers as of those of the Phoenix Force. As punishment, the crystal "genetically froze their evolution in place" allowing the rest of creation to pass them by. In an attempt to further their development, some Kree bred with other species, producing the 'pink-skinned' Kree. These pinks (also called 'whites') eventually outnumbered the blue-skin Kree, but were far from accepted amongst their brethren; many pink kree were exiled from the homeworld and put into forced labor camps on barren moons due to prejudice and racism. The Kree value what they consider to be their genetic purity, to such an extent that reproduction outside of the species is a strict taboo. In the Kree empire, it is a crime for a male non-Kree to impregnate any Kree.

The Kree race has produced individual super-humanoid beings, either through natural mutation, genetic engineering, or cyborg technology, including Mar-Vell, Ronan the Accuser, Ultimus, Shatterax, Korath, and others.

The Supreme Intelligence attempted to jumpstart the evolutionary process of the Kree. Through a series of events discussed below during Operation: Galactic Storm and the Destiny War, it arranged for a large number of its people to be irradiated with a Nega-Bomb (killing 90% of the Kree), and then artificially sped up their evolution by means of an artifact called the Forever Crystal. This new brand of evolved Kree, called Ruul, have a grayish skin tone and shoulder-length tentacles atop their heads. Individuals possess the ability to consciously 'will' adaptation of physical form to different environments, affording them controlled metamorphosis, spontaneously developing the ability to breathe underwater, fly, change form or whatever their circumstances require. The females had also lost their ability, since the males now had that ability.

The Inhumans later brought to light a long-held secret about the creation of the Kree. As it turns out, the Kree are in fact of Universal Inhuman stock, the first of their kind. Unlike a great many races throughout the universe, the Kree were alternated by two races of cosmological abstracts in the likes of the Celestials and the Progenitors, which evolved them from primitives to empire builders. While the Celestials went on to spawn the Kree born Eternals, it was the Progenitors, a race of universal gardeners and cosmic scientists that made their home at the far end of the cosmos within the heart of a lone star, who through the introduction of the Prima Materia which the Progenitors mine and process on their World Farm called The Primagen, were able to force evolve the cro-magnon Kree race into the cosmic conquerors that they are today.

== Culture ==
The Kree are an imperialistic and militaristic society with the only widespread religion being worship of the Supreme Intelligence. A small minority, like the Priests of Pama, practice a pacifist Cotati religion, but this is forbidden (early Captain Marvel stories mentioned an 'idol' called Tam-Borr and a 'fabricated' god named Zo, whom Mar-Vell served between issues 11 and 15). Some are members of the Universal Church of Truth.

The Kree Empire extends throughout nearly a thousand worlds in the northwestern lobe (Earth reference) of the Greater Magellanic Cloud with outposts in other galaxies.

Kree names are usually short, being one or two syllables. Given names are separated from surnames by a hyphen. Examples include Mar-Vell, Yon-Rogg, Una-Rogg, and Zey-Rogg.

Some Kree names reference the comic book industry, such as Mar-Vell (Marvel Comics), Att-Las (Atlas Comics), Dea-Sea (DC Comics), and Star-Lyn (Jim Starlin).

Generally, the offspring of officers of the Kree Imperial Militia are immediately conscripted.

=== Population ===
The Kree population was in excess of 30 billion prior to the Nega-Bomb detonation. The Kree lost an alleged 98% of their population after the Bomb detonated. Although the pink-skinned Kree are in the majority, it is the blue-skinned Kree, such as Ronan, who dominate their society.

High population and technological development allow for highly urbanized planets. Most of the surface of Hala, the origin planet of the civilization, is covered by futuristic city-states, and the second capital planet, Kree-lar, is described as "the most heavily populated world of all".

=== Government ===
Under the Supreme Intelligence, the Kree Empire was a military dictatorship. Under Clumsy Foulup, the Kree were temporarily a monarchy, and while under Ael-Dan and Dar-Benn, they were a military dictatorship.

The Kree began their empire over a million years ago, within a hundred years of the acquisition of interstellar technology from the Skrulls (at that time, a benevolent people). The Skrulls at the time were attempting to start a galactic empire of their own, this one based on free trade, and they landed on Hala to help the barbaric natives advance to the point where they could join.

Although Hala is the official planet of the Kree's origin, for a time, the planet Kree-Lar in the Turunal system served as the capital of the Kree Empire as well as the seat of the government. The Kree Empire is ruled as a militaristic dictatorship. The permanent ruler was the organic computer-construct called the Supremor (or Supreme Intelligence), an immense computer system to which the preserved brains of the greatest intellects of the Kree race have been linked. Aiding the Supreme Intelligence were a number of imperial administrators on Kree-Lar, who are also governors of each of the member worlds, and a vast standing space militia. They also employ powerful automatons called Sentries whose job it is to keep member worlds under the empire's watchful eye.

The Kree empire is later ruled by Black Bolt and the Inhuman Royal Family, who gained power after Ronan the Accuser, ruler of the Kree after the Supreme Intelligence's demise, submitted to him.

=== Languages ===
The Kree language exist in different versions, including at least ancient Imperial Kree and Kreevian.

=== Money ===
The Kree used as currency the kredits, or credits.

=== Technology ===
The Kree Empire extends across a thousand worlds in the northwestern lobe (Earth reference) of the Greater Magellanic Cloud. They are the only race in the galaxy to possess the Omni-Wave Projector technology, a device that can enable communication across hyperspace as well as be used in an offensive capacity as a weapon. They also possess cloaking technology, which they call the 'aura of negativity'.

Kree technology includes advanced warp-drive starships, robotics (such as the Sentries and the Destructoids), bionic and cybernetic (Cy-Mek) technology, advanced genetic engineering, psionic technology (Psyche-Magnitron), advanced energy weaponry (Uni-Beam), cosmic power generation, nuclear/antimatter weapons and even dimensional linking and siphoning devices. Across the myriad of realities, further advancements of Prime Marvel Universe Kree Tech has been made in strides.

Some Kree inventions have been outlawed, such as the organic-destroying robots Null-Trons, corpse revitalizing Mim Units, and the genetic-enhance Psyche-Magnitron.

In ultimate comics, they make use of nanomolecular shapeshifting battle armor with advanced genetic tailoring capabilities which can harness thermonuclear to cosmological force as both weaponry and power source. The multiversal traveler Marvel Boy makes use of similar metamorphic technology powered by whats called Kirby Engineering, mechanical works powered through belief and mental interfacing along with shifting liquid metal or self-replicating nanotech.

== Fictional history ==
=== Antiquity ===
A million years ago, a race called the Skrulls came upon Hala. At that time, the Skrulls were a largely peaceful space-faring race, and they set about educating the natives to the point where they could join their trading empire. However, Hala was home to two equally intelligent races, the Kree and the Cotati.

The Skrulls proposed a test which involved taking members of each race to distant planetoids, with supplies for one year, and then returning at the end to judge what each group had created. The Skrulls took the Cotati to a barren moon and then brought the Kree to Earth's moon, where they created the Blue Area of the Moon. While the Cotati created a beautiful garden, the Kree constructed the magnificent Blue City.

The Skrulls returned to judge the accomplishments of the groups and return them all to Hala. Once back on their homeworld, the Kree leader Morag learned that the Skrulls had been impressed by the city, but the other Skrulls were more impressed by the Cotati's success. Enraged, the Kree wiped out the Cotati and then, when the Skrull protested, killed them as well and seized the Skrulls' starship. They then set about deciphering the technology of the starship.

=== Kree–Skrull War ===
When acquiring the technology from the Skrulls, the Kree began to spread throughout the Greater Magellanic Cloud. The Kree launched an attack upon the Skrull empire and the peaceful Skrulls were again forced to become war-like.

At the same time, the Cotati on Hala were almost driven to extinction. However, a small handful of pacifist Kree, hid and kept safe a group of Cotati. Eventually, these Kree began worshipping the Cotati that they had kept sheltered. To further hide and keep them safe, the priests relocated the surviving Cotati throughout the universe.

Years later, the Kree, aware that the Skrulls had once created the Cosmic Cube, designed a cybernetic/organic supercomputer called the Supreme Intelligence to help them in creating a Cube. When the computer became functional, it determined that a Cosmic Cube would be too dangerous to construct and refused the Science Council's request.

At the beginning of the War, the Kree established a station on Uranus. Through their work, they discovered that sentient life on Earth had genetic potential invested in it by the Celestials. Intrigued, the Kree began to experiment on humans.

Their goal was twofold – to investigate possible ways of circumventing their own evolutionary stagnation, and to create powerful soldiers to use against the Skrulls. However, the Kree abandoned their experiments.

The humans test subjects, eventually dubbed the Inhumans, went on to form a society of their own. Later, a surveillance robot, Sentry 459, that was stationed on a South Pacific island was eventually awakened by the Fantastic Four and alerted the Kree. This caused Ronan the Accuser to punish those who "murdered" the guard, but the Fantastic Four defeated him. During the war, the Supreme Intelligence is elected as absolute ruler of the Kree.

==== The War comes to Earth ====
The Earth's importance as a strategic beachhead became apparent when the Avengers became involved in the Kree-Skrull hostilities. In the meantime, the Kree were reestablishing cultural ties with the Inhumans.

At this point, the Kree hero, Captain Marvel, revealed to the Avengers that the Kree were planning to 'erase' humanity. This scheme was foiled by Mar-Vell and the Avengers.

As the war escalated, and Earth's position became increasingly precarious, the original Avengers were recalled to active service after a Skrull scouting party managed to abduct Mar-Vell, Quicksilver, and Scarlet Witch and also attempted to destroy the Inhumans' Great Refuge, but failed when the Avengers intervened. During the conflict, the Super-Skrull took his prisoners back to the Skrull home-world, leaving the remaining Avengers to pick up the pieces and reform their tattered forces.

The conflict worsened when the Avengers began to understand the scale of the war. They discovered a Skrull fleet wanting to destroy Earth and a Kree fleet wanting to stop them. All sides were determined to either invade or decimate the Earth in order to prevent it falling into the 'wrong' hands. Led by Thor, Iron Man, and Vision, the Avengers launched an attack on the Skrull flagship, somehow managing to turn back the fleet after a desperate battle.

The war came to a close when the Supreme Intelligence managed to bring Rick Jones into his presence and temporarily altered Rick's DNA to release his 'full evolutionary potential.' Armed with godlike powers, Rick freezes the Kree and Skrull forces, allowing the Intelligence to re-establish control over his people and bring the war to a halt.

=== Further Kree–Skrull Wars ===
At several points in the years after the end of the first Kree–Skrull war, hostilities were said to have broken out again between the two empires.

The most significant of these instances came when the Skrulls lost their ability to shapeshift, and a Skrull Warlord provoked new hostilities. During this war, the Supreme Intelligence was incapacitated by the Silver Surfer. Afterwards, Nenora, a Skrull spy in the guise of a high ranking Kree official, took command of the Kree empire. The war ended with Nenora's death at the hands of S'ybill, the Skrull Empress. Rulership of the Kree was assumed by an alien named Clumsy Foulup, who was soon assassinated by Kree military officers.

The machinations of Thanos led to the sudden elimination of half the universe's life-forms. Unaware of Thanos' role in the disappearance, the Kree and the Skrull blamed each other and temporarily renewed fighting.

=== Kree-Shi'ar War ===
Not long after the conflicts with the Skrull ended, the Kree again found themselves embroiled in a war, this time with the Shi'ar empire. This war was much shorter, and was engineered by the Skrulls and the Supreme Intelligence.

The Avengers of Earth became involved in the conflict when the Shi'ar opened a wormhole in Earth's solar system to gain rapid access to Kree territory, unconcerned about the damage that would be caused to Earth's Sun as a result. Their involvement inadvertently set off a chain of events that led to a powerful artifact known as Nega-Bomb being detonated in Kree space, causing an explosive and radioactive reaction that devastated the Kree empire, with ninety percent of the Kree dying, and led to its surrender to the Sh'iar. It was later revealed that the Supreme Intelligence was ultimately responsible for the Bomb's detonation as part of an attempt to kick-start the Kree race's genetic development. Appalled by this callous disregard for the life of its people, a group of Avengers executed the living supercomputer. The Kree territory was then annexed by the Sh'iar, with Majestrix Lilandra naming her sister Deathbird as the territory's administrator. Deathbird has since abandoned this post.

=== Ruul and retcon ===
The remaining Kree slowly began evolving which was sped up through the machinations of the Supreme Intelligence and the Forever Crystal until they transformed and renamed themselves into a new species: the Ruul. Under the ruse of being a spacefaring species from beyond charted space, the race orchestrated the events of Maximum Security that temporarily turned Earth into a prison. Their plans for Earth was prevented when their Kree origin and behind-the-scenes manipulations were revealed. The machinations of the Supreme Intelligence were undone when Genis-Vell, son of Mar-Vell, restored the Kree race to its original form when he destroyed and recreated the universe.

Kree soldiers also appeared during "Avengers Disassembled", when they attacked the Earth and were driven off by the Avengers.

=== Annihilation ===
In Annihilation #2, it is revealed that many Kree soldiers, commanded by the merchant House of Fiyero, joined the United Front to fight the Annihilation Wave. After killing the Supreme Intelligence and wiping out the House of Fiyero, Ronan the Accuser assumes control of the Kree Empire.

=== Annihilation: Conquest ===
During Annihilation: Conquest, the Kree Empire is assimilated by the Phalanx and Ultron, and isolate Kree space from the rest of the universe, but are stopped by the Guardians of the Galaxy, Nova, Warlock, and Warlock's adopted son Tyro.

=== Secret Invasion ===
The Kree have an agent on Earth that learns about the Skrull "Secret Invasion" but he is supposedly killed before he can summon help.

Noh-Varr proclaims the planet under Kree protection and takes part in the final battle. He is deemed a hero by the planet's population and by the Kree that learn of his bravery during the attack. He serves on Osborn's Avengers until he learns of their true nature. While on the run, he manages to communicate with the Supreme Intelligence who grants him the title and position of Protector of Earth and bestows a pair of custom Negabands to him.

=== War of Kings ===
Shortly after the Invasion of Earth occurs, the Inhumans begin their personal assault on the Skrull Empire. After destroying a Skrull warship that has fled into Shi'ar Space, as well as three Shi'ar Warbirds, the Inhumans next travel to Kree-Lar and claim dominion over the Kree Empire.

Emperor Vulcan, leader of the Shi'ar, declares war against the Kree and launches a surprise attack during the wedding of Ronan and Crystal. The Kree retaliate and through the actions of the various royal family members they endear themselves to the Kree.

After the assassination of former Empress Lilandra, the Kree launch a T-Bomb powered by Black Bolt's voice, intended to end the war swiftly and decisively. Black Bolt is attacked by Vulcan and the two are presumed dead when the bomb explodes in Shi'ar territory. The Kree claim victory and control of the Shi'ar empire.

=== Realm of Kings ===
Medusa briefly struggles as sole ruler of the Kree Empire until Black Bolt returned to Attilan shortly after his supposed death. He led the Kree and Inhumans into battle during the War of Four Cities.

=== Avengers vs X-Men ===
In "Avengers vs. X-Men," in the wake of the Phoenix Force's advent, making its way towards earth in search for its latest host. Noh-Varr is contacted by the Supreme Intelligence demanding that he capture its power for the Kree Empire. Once after initial failure, earth's mightiest are eventually successful in the acquisition of its essence, however, Protector betrays the team and hands it to the Supremor as per his mission directive.

But then realizing the Kree had no intention of saving Earth from the Phoenix, Noh-Varr quickly turns on them and returns the Phoenix essence to the enraged Avengers who leave him behind on Hala as they return to earth. Noh-Varr on the other hand is hunted mercilessly for his betrayal. Before they manage to find him, however, he plants a bomb that eviscerates his assailants along with the Supremor's main housing.

A secret group working around the Kree hierarchy through Plex like mind control would later use the power of the cosmic force in conjunction with the M'Kraan Crystal to resurrect Mar-Vell. With Mar-Vell at their command, the Kree designate heroes Carol Danvers and Noh-Varr would soon fall under command of Mar-Vell and the gene-based manipulatory broadcast used to manipulate the Kree into their service. Causing them to turn on the Secret Avengers and order a public execution for some of them as the Phoenix arrives.

As it was later revealed, disgraced descendants of Mar-Vell would act to draw the Phoenix away from Earth and towards Hala in a suicidal attempt to kick-start the races transcendence. This plan failed as the Vision emitted a counter broadcast to said grand nephew's unique telepathic abilities controlling everyone on Hala, as the father committed suicide before killing his own son, The Kree homeworld was spared when Captain Marvel sacrificed his own life and the Phoenix energies sustaining him as the entity came to take it back.

=== Infinity ===
During the "Infinity" storyline, Ronan the Accuser and the Supreme Intelligence appear as members of the Galactic Council, representing the Kree Empire. In the aftermath of the fight with the Builders and the fight against Thanos, the Supreme Intelligence pardons Ronan and the Kree army.

=== The Black Vortex ===
During "The Black Vortex" storyline, Ronan the Accuser steals the Black Vortex from the cosmically-powered X-Men, who then rampage on Hala. They eventually leave, but Mister Knife uses the opportunity to steal the Black Vortex and then destroys Hala and the Supreme Intelligence out of petty revenge. Ronan and the Imperial Fleet survive, while the last remaining seed of the Supreme Intelligence is stolen by Captain Victoria.

=== Royals ===
As the Inhuman royal family, aided by Noh-Varr, make their way to the ruins of Hala in search of the Primagen. They are encountered by the still cosmically empowered Ronan the Accuser, who traps them in a prison tailored to torment each of its detainees.

Marvel Boy works around it with his own battlefield device. Moving to free the Inhumans with the help of Maximus while soothing the accuser with simulations of a thriving Kree Emperium.

Having helped sow the seeds to reestablish the reformation of the fallen Kree, the Royals depart. Leaving the last accuser to pick up the pieces and hopefully mend itself with the help of the steadily regrowing Plex Intelligence, with Crystal coming along.

=== Death of the Inhumans ===
It was later revealed that the Kree soldiers behind Vox had actually captured Ronan and those loyal to him to be experimented on. After breaking free and killing some Kree soldiers, Black Bolt finds where Ronan, now a cyborg, is being held and kills him out of mercy. Vox ordered an army of brainwashed Inhumans to fight Black Bolt when he entered the area where the Kree kept the brainwashed Inhumans under control during the Inhuman Royal Family's last attack on the Kree. To thwart the Kree's schemes, Black Bolt had to exterminate everyone there with his mighty voice. Eventually, Vox and his Kree masters had to go.

=== Empyre ===
In the "Road to Empyre," Teddy Altman is made a mysterious offer at the cost of leaving Billy Kaplan. He accepts the offer which was to become the new ruler of the Kree-Skrull Alliance, adopting the mantle of "Dorrek VIII," and beginning the preparations of invading the Earth for "the final war."

== Known Kree ==
- Aa-Garn – A Kree corporal loyal to Generals Ael-Dan and Dar-Benn during their coup attempted to attack the robotic Silver Surfer, but was killed by General Ael-Dan.
- Ael-Dan – Blue Kree General. He, along with Dar-Benn, used a Silver Surfer robot to execute Clumsy Foulup and General Dwi-Zann during the Infinity Gauntlet. He was killed by Deathbird during the Kree-Shi'ar war.
- Ahmbra – A Kree who assumed the human identity of Amber Watkins to watch Ultra Girl.
- Ajes'ha – A Kree member of The Chosen Eight of Fate, the guardians of the Lifestone Tree. She originally held the Moonstone that would eventually empower Karla Sofen.
- Captain Atlas (Att-Lass) – A Kree who is a member of Starforce and ally of Minerva. He was later mutated by the Psyche-Magnitron.
- Av-Rom – A Kree who is part of a group of Kree seeking to claim Hulkling.
- Bar-Konn – A Kree captain who represents the Kree on the Alpha Flight Space Program's board of governors.
- Bas-For – A Kree lieutenant aboard a Destructoid Battle Cruiser.
- Bav-Tek – A Kree who is a member of the Kree Resistance Front.
- Bel-Dann – A Kree Colonel who is a member of the Kree Peace Battalion. Bel-Dann battled Raksor on behalf of the entire Kree empire.
- Bheton – A Kree who is the leader of Ultra-Girl's would-be mentors that resided on Earth.
- Brock – A Kree who is a bodyguard to the Supereme Intelligence.
- Bron-Char – A Kree who is a member of Galen-Kor's Lunatic Legion.
- Bronek – The leader of the Kree circa 78000 BC. Bronek was the one who created the Sentries.
- Bun-Dall – Servitor to Supremor
- Chief – Stationed on Drez-Lar under Ko-Rel. Killed by Gamora and the Phalanx.
- Ciry – Member of the Lunatic Legion.
- Dandre – A Kree who resided on Earth and is one of Ultra-Girl's would be mentors.
- Dantella – Member of the Kree Resistance Front. Currently deceased.
- Dar-Benn – A Pink Kree general who used a Silver Surfer robot to execute Clumsy Foulup and General Dwi-Zann during the Infinity Gauntlet. Killed by Deathbird during the Kree-Shi'ar war.
- Dea-Sea – A Kree who was last seen as a child.
- Devros – A Kree who is also known as the Brood King. Devros was a grand admiral and former commanding officer of Zen-Pram. He was transformed into a Brood and later killed by Mar-Vell.
- Dimples – A Kree stationed on Drez-Lar under Ko-Rel; killed by Gamora and the Phalanx.
- Dwi-Zann – A white Kree who was a general and ally of Clumsy Foulup; he was executed by the Silver Surfer robot controlled by Ael-Dann and Dar-Benn
- Dylon Cir – A member of Galen-Kor's Lunatic Legion; he was converted into energy for the Omni-Wave Projector.
- Ell-Vokk – Lieutenant Kar-Vokk's wife.
- En-Vad – A captain who trained Mar-Vell; he was part of an expedition to conquer Toped but was killed by Genis-Vell.
- Ess – was absorbed by the Phalanx.
- Doctor Eve – Rogue doctor who created the outlawed shape-shifting Mim Units. She attempted to restore the Kree empire to its former glory.
- Falzon – Scientist; father of Shatterstar (Arides); currently deceased.
- Fer-Porr – A member of the Lunatic Legion.
- Flagpole – A Kree stationed on Drez-Lar under Ko-Rel; killed by Gamora and the Phalanx.
- Galen-Kor – Founder and leader of the Lunatic Legion. He is apparently killed along with the rest of the Legion when they are converted into energy to fuel the Omni-Wave.
- Captain Glory (Gla-Ree) – A Kree who is a member of the alien version of the Lethal Legion.
- Hala the Accuser – A member of the Kree's Accuser Corps.
- Hav-Ak – A member of the Kree Peace Battalion; later killed.
- House of Fiyero – The ruling house on Hala who ordered that the Supreme Intelligence be lobotomized. They later saw Ronan as a threat and gave Tana Nile information on Thanos in exchange for framing Ronan for conspiring against them. The House of Fiyero attempted an alliance with Annihilation Wave, but were all killed by Ronan.
- Huran the Accuser – A previous member of the Kree's Accuser Corps thousands of years ago.
- Jat Vor-Thrul – Kree Cyborg who was a pirate. He was the engineer of the crew known as the Salvagers.
- Jella – A member of the Kree Peace Battalion; later killed.
- Jul – A Kree who was killed by the Phalanx.
- Kaer-Linn – A forgotten Kree scientist. Kaer-Linn built the Silver Surfer robot that executed Clumsy Foulup and General Dwi-Zann. He in turn was killed by Ael-Dan.
- Kalum Fahr – A major in the Kree army
- Kar-Sagg – A scientist who helped transfer Midnight Sun into a clone body.
- Kar-Vokk – A Kree Lieutenant and a subordinate of General Pad-Varr.
- Keeyah – A former member of the Starjammers, was the pilot for a time.
- Kid Kree (Mel-Varr) – A Kree child from Nova Hala IV who wanted to capture Moon Girl and attempted to use the moniker "Captain Kree".
- Klaer – A member of the Kree Peace Battalion.
- Kona Lor – A member of Galen-Kor's Lunatic Legion; he was converted into energy for the Omni-Wave Projector.
- Korath the Pursuer (Korath-Thak) – A member of Starforce and a cyber-geneticist; founded the Pursuer project; later imbued with the power of Pursuer.
- Ko-Rel (Nova 0001) – The mother of Zam; stationed on Drez-Lar; she had the Xandarian Worldmind uploaded into her to become a member of the Nova Corps so she could protect Richard Rider from the Phalanx; eventually killed by Gamora.
- Koth – The Kree lawgiver, who wrote "wheresoever Kree sets foot so shall Kree law hold sway", which was added to the Tablets of Koth.
- Kree Peace Battalion –
- Kree Resistance Front – A group of Kree who desired freedom from Shi'ar.
- Lar-Ka – A former field commander in United Front who was executed by Ronan.
- Lauri-Ell - A Kree who was grown in a lab and is responsible for the destruction of the experimental city of Ki'nal on the planet Mar-da'en. Carol Danvers discovered that her mother is Mari-Ell, making Lauri-Ell the half-sister of Carol. Because of this, Carol was unable to kill her and made off with her.
- Leigh Marshall – A Kree who was posing as a human girl on Earth with her father; dated a Skrull boy.
- Levan – A member of Freebooter.
- The Lunatic Legion – A Kree conspiracy group; the first Legion, led by Zarek, was based on the Blue Area of the Moon; the second, led by Galen-Kor, was also based on the Moon but were agents of the unwilling Supreme Intelligence.
- Mac-Ronn – Scientist and ally of Ronan.
- Mar-Kann – Pink Kree General that rebelled and became the Supreme Leader.
- Mar-Koll – Kree salesman, he considers himself to be the best salesperson in the seven galaxies, and prefers to call himself, "Captain Miracle", but is popularly known as Scott Kree.
- Captain Marvel (Mar-Vell) – A pink Kree Captain who defected to Earth and became the first hero known as Captain Marvel.
- Mari-Ell – A Kree spy, and elite guard of the Supreme Protectorate, sent to Earth, but fell in love with Joseph Danvers, Sr. and gave birth to Carol Danvers. She is killed by a Kree Kleaner for betraying the Empire.
- Maston-Dar – A Kree general who once led the Kree forces to reclaim the Blue Area of the Moon from the Inhumans.
- Doctor Minerva (Minn-Erva) – A geneticist and member of Starforce who attempted to mate with Mar-Vell to sire a superior offspring to advance the evolutionary potential of the Kree.
- M-Nell (Commando) – A member of the Imperial Guard; joined to symbolize unity between Kree and Shi'ar.
- Mon-Tog – A black Kree who is the commander of an outpost near Stent.
- Morag – A Kree tribal leader from ions ago who oversaw the construction of the Blue Area of the Moon.
- Murius – Wife of Falzon and mother of Shatterstar (Arides); later killed by her son.
- Nenora – Also known as Agent K6; Skrull that infiltrated Kree; former lover of Aptak and agent of Kylor; former chief coordinator of the Supreme Intelligence; she secretly informed Skrulls of Kree plans, until she became the Kree Empire's leader; she was revealed to be a Skrull by S'byll and deposed.
- Noh-Varr – A Kree soldier from a parallel reality, called Marvel Boy.
- "OMG" Olivia – A young girl Kree who is a direct descendant of the original Kree scientists who created the Inhumans and hopes to restore her family name by controlling humanity with mind-controlling nanites.
- Om-Fad – Lamentis-based member of the Priests of Pama; ally of Quasar (Phyla-Vell) and Moondragon.
- Pad-Varr – A Kree General and father of Mel-Varr (Kid Kree).
- Pap-Tonn – A Kree scientist.
- Phae-Dor – The former leader of the Kree Science Council; attempted to capture Mar-Vell from the ship of Dr. Minerva for use in the War of the Three Galaxies.
- The Priests of Pama – Pacifists; trained Libra and Mantis.
- Priests of Shao Lom – A splinter group of Priests of Pama that trained Moondragon on Saturn's moon Titan.
- Pulse – Kree bio-mechanical lifeform and a member of the underground resistance to the Shi'ar occupying force, following the Kree/Shi'ar war.
- Ra-Venn – A Kree Resistance fighter during the Phalanx attack that attempted to recruit Wraith to her cause. They met again while her ship was being attacked but was rescued by the combined effort of Super-Skrull, Praxagora, and Wraith, whom she convinced to work together. They managed to free Hala from occupation. During the battle between the Inhumans and Shi'ar, she joined a strike team led by Triton. When Black Bolt was lost they investigated a noise that matched his acoustic frequency, but only found a spectral image of him repeating the last battle inside of the Fault. When the energies of the Cancerverse began to mutate and merge the Kree members of Triton's strikeforce, she and the crew were killed by Medusa and the Chorus Sentries.
- Raz-El - A Kree commander who led his forces in an attempt to apprehend Lauri-Ell.
- Ronan the Accuser – The former Supreme Public Accuser of the Kree empire; leader of the Kree Accuser Corps, formerly administered justice on behalf of the Kree, acted for the Shi'ar once they took over Kree empire, allied himself with Richard Rider during the assault by the Annihilation Wave. Ronan turned the Empire over to the Inhumans and married into the Inhuman Royal Family.
- Sallen Bei – A Kree drafted the record of the events of the Kree/Shi'ar war that was recovered by the future "Lunatic Legion"
- Sals-Bek – A Kree assassin.
- Saria – A Kree who had an affair with Genis-Vell.
- Sar-Torr – A Kree who was aboard the Helion.
- Sen – A Kree. Killed by the Phalanx.
- Shatterax (Roco-Bai) – A cybernetically enhanced member of Star Force.
- Shatterstar (Arides) – A super-powered soldier of the Personal Service Corps, Son of Kree photometric scientists Falzon and Murius whom he betrayed when they attempted to rebel and raise their child properly. His mother was killed when caught.
- Shymr – A member of the Kree Resistance Front.
- Sim-Del – A brilliant scientist who was exiled from the Kree Empire. Killed by Kree agents, after saving his son, Zak-Del, from his execution.
- Singhre (Shen-Garh) – One of Ultra-Girl's would be mentors who posed as her doctor; assumed the identity of Dr Steven Singer.
- Sinta the Accuser – An Accuser who met and escorted Noh-Varr to the Supreme Intelligence.
- Sintaris – High Kronaster and ambassador to the Intergalactic Council.
- Soh-Larr – Husband of Skrull Ryga'a and father of Dorrek Supreme.
- Sro-Himm – A member of the Lunatic Legion.
- Staak the Evolver – Kree bio-organism and ultimate assassin.
- Starstealth – Kree warriors attempting to avenge the loss of the Kree/Sh'iar war; formerly imprisoned in the Vault; extradited to an interstellar War-Crimes Tribunal.
  - Kalum Lo – A Kree major in the Kree army and leader of Starstealth; he led an assault on Earth that temporarily destroyed Wonder Man.
  - Bo‘sun Stug-Bar – A member of Starstealth.
  - Zamsed – Terrorist of Starstealth, former Kree military.
  - Zenna – A member of Starstealth.
- Stella Nega – Kree Leader of the Guardians of the Galaxy 1000 A.D.
- Supreme Intelligence – The collective minds of the greatest Kree of Hala who is the supreme ruler of the Kree. It was originally created in order to lead creation of a counterpart to the Skrull Cosmic Cube. The Supreme Intelligence was executed by the Avengers, lobotomized by the House of Fiyero and then mercy killed by Ronan. Eventually revived by the accuser after Realm of Kings only to be killed again as Mr. Knife and his cosmic Slaughter Lords destroyed Hala.
- Talla Ron – A member of Galen-Kor's Lunatic Legion; he was converted into energy for the Omni-Wave Projector.
- Tanalth the Pursuer – Current leader of the Kree Pursuer Corps.
- Tarnok-Kol – A Kree Major in the Kree army.
- Ten-Cor – A Kree who worked alongside Peter Quill on Hala until being assimilated by the Phalanx.
- Tel-Kar – Tel-Kar was recruited to bond to a newborn Symbiote (which would become Venom) and use its shapeshifting ability to act as a double agent to the Skrulls. He got lobotomized by Venom's offspring Sleeper which bonded to him as revenge for what he did Venom and Eddie Brock. He is now used by Sleeper as a body so it can explore the universe.
- Tiptoe – Stationed on Drez-Lar under Ko-Rel; killed by Gamora and the Phalanx.
- Tir-Zar – Served under Yon-Rogg.
- Tol-Nokk – An assassin.
- Tus-Katt – A coordinator for the Supreme Intelligence.
- Ultimus (Ard-Con) – Kree Eternal; also known as Demon Druid; member of Starforce; buried under Stonehenge 3000 years ago by Tantalus; adopted a new name when he learned of his true origin from the Supreme Intelligence.
- Una – Medic stationed under Yon-Rogg; was the romantic interest of Mar-Vell; killed by a stray blast during a battle with the Aakon.
- Una-Rogg – The daughter of Yon-Rogg and former lover of Ronan. She is an enemy of Genis-Vell.
- Uni – A Kree who participated in an expedition to conquer Toped.
- Underground Militia – Pink-Skinned Kree penal slaves turned fanatical terrorist cell on Earth. Incensed at their own people for ancestral persecution, they eventually turned their rage towards Earth after discovering the homeworld's fate in Operation: Galactic Storm. Blaming the superpowered populace of earth for the destruction of the Kree empire, seeking to turn the world against its heroes while priming a Nega Bomb like device to destroy it.
  - Nera – A white terrorist Kree.
  - Primus – A white Kree; former pawn of the Supreme Intelligence; he led an underground militia.
  - Tellis – A white terrorist Kree
- Star Brand (Va-Sohn) – Kree given the powers of the Star Brand during a White Event in Kree-Pama.
- Vron-Ikka – A Major in the Kree army; slept with Rick Jones in an attempt to gain the rights to his memoirs; believed they held the secret to his Destiny Power.
- William Kevin Wagner – A Kree living as a human; lover of Carol Danvers; blackmailed into staying away from Carol by Sarah Day.
- Wraith (Zak-Del) – A rogue Kree that houses Exolon parasites in his body and the son of the exiled Sim-Del, a brilliant inventor that was banished for his work. After witnessing his parents getting killed by agents members of the Kree, Wraith set out on a quest of vengeance, feeling no particular loyalty to his race or anyone else, but is eventually recruited to help with the war against the Phalanx in the Annihilation: Conquest storyline.
- Yan – A Kree who was killed by the Phalanx.
- Yon-Rogg – A Kree colonel who is the father of Zey-Rogg and Una-Rogg; led the Helion in mission to investigate Earth; former superior to Mar-Vell; later opposed him. Absorbed the power of a Psyche-Magnitron and gained abilities similar to Captain Marvel (Carol Danvers).
- Zam-Rel – The son of Ko-Rel (Nova 001).
- Zarek – A Kree Prime Minister.
- Zen-Pram – Commander in the Kree army; captured and hatched into a Brood; killed by Mar-Vell.
- Zey-Rogg – The son of Yon-Rogg; brother of Una-Rogg; transported to the Microverse by Captain Marvel (Carol Danvers) and wounded by an execution squad intending to assassinate Rick Jones.
- Zyro – A technician serving under Yon-Rogg.

=== Kree hybrids ===
The following are known Kree hybrids:

- Car-Ell / Carol Danvers – Earth superheroine who was born to a Kree mother and human father and raised on Earth. Originally believing herself fully human, her latent Kree abilities were triggered by the exploding Psyche-Magnitron.
- Hulkling (Dorrek VIII / Teddy Altman) – A member of the Young Avengers; son of Mar-Vell and Princess Anelle making him half-Kree/half-Skrull; husband of Billy Kaplan (Wiccan); was taken to Earth where he was raised.
- Captain Marvel / Photon (Genis-Vell) – A former member of the Thunderbolts; genetically engineered son of Mar-Vell and Elysius who was artificially aged to adulthood and imbued with memories of growing up on Titan.
- Knights of the Infinite – A group of Kree/Skrull hybrids who believed in a prophecy about unifying the two empires and becoming their protectors.
  - Dorrek Supreme – The group's leader and the first wielder of the "Excelsior" Sword.
  - M'ryn – A member of the group who founded the prophecy and father of Mur-G'nn. Killed by the wizard Moridun to be used as body for the latter.
  - K'kyy – A female member of the group. She assisted in kidnapping Dorrek VIII for the latter to become king of the new empire.
  - Mur-G'nn – A female member of the group. She assisted in kidnapping Dorrek VIII.
  - Lan-Zarr – A member of the group. He guided Dorrek VIII through the test to see if he was Dorrek Supreme reincarnated.
  - Varra – A female member of the group. She is killed by Moridun who wanted to possess Wiccan, but was saved by Hulkling.
- Hav-Rogg – The son of Zey-Rogg and grandson of Yon-Rogg.
- Quasar (Phyla-Vell) – The genetic daughter of Mar-Vell and Elysius; created in an alternate timeline that was woven into current reality (Earth-616) when Genis led Entropy to remake the universe; developed romance with Moondragon; gained Quantum Bands after taking them from Annihilus. Killed by Thanos.
- Ultra Girl (Suzanna Sherman / Tzu-Zana) – An Earth superheroine who is a former member of the New Warriors; she was a member of the Initiative.
- The child of Vulcan and Deathbird was infused with Kree genes.

== Other versions ==
=== House of M ===
In the House of M reality, Genis-Vell is a Kree ambassador who was a guest to the House of Magnus on Genosha.

=== MC2 ===
The Earth Sentry is a human/Kree hybrid from the MC2 reality.

=== Ultimate Marvel ===
The Ultimate Marvel version of the Kree are ichthyoid humanoids who are unable to speak English without surgical modification. The Kree have referred to a Supreme Intelligence, but it has not yet been shown. Some of them worship, or follow the teachings of, a being called Hala, a historic figure comparable to Buddha who preached on the preservation of life while claiming not to be a god. The Ultimate Marvel version of Captain Marvel (Mahr Vehl) is a Kree spy who was surgically altered to appear human and is an alleged descendant of Hala.

=== Earth-200080 ===
The reality from which the 18th Diplomatic Gestalt Envoy that crashed on the prime Marvel Universe hailed from. The Reality from which Noh-Varr, the dimensional lost hero and rogue of said universe, hails. In his own words and the We Plex unit's historical account, it is a utopian parallel helmed by an intergalactic as well as inter-dimensional spanning Kree Empire. Where travel and interaction with parallel worlds across the quasiverse is par the course for the Kree Diplomatic Gestalt Naval fleet of their continuum.

=== Ruins ===
In Ruins, Mar-Vell and his Kree fleet intended to invade Earth, but were exposed after energy from Silver Surfer's corpse disabled their ship's cloaking. The surviving Kree were captured by the government and sent to a concentration camp built on a nuclear test site, inflicting them with terminal cancer.

=== Thirty years into the future ===
In an alternate timeline set thirty years into the future, the Kree Empire was united with the Skrull Empire under the rulership of Emperor Dorrek VIII and they were successful in eliminating all life on Earth.

== In other media ==
=== Marvel Cinematic Universe ===
The Kree were informally introduced into the Marvel Cinematic Universe through the TV series Agents of S.H.I.E.L.D. In the episode "T.A.H.I.T.I.", S.H.I.E.L.D. agent Phil Coulson discovers a blue-skinned corpse in the Guest House facility, which executive producer Jeffrey Bell confirmed to be a Kree. In the episode "Yes Men", Sif states that she has encountered Kree in the past. In the second-season episodes "...Ye Who Enter Here", "What They Become", and "Who You Really Are", it is revealed that a rogue Kree faction visited Earth as part of their experiments to create genetically altered soldiers, resulting in the Inhumans.

The Kree are featured in the 2014 film Guardians of the Galaxy, with Ronan the Accuser (Lee Pace) and Korath the Pursuer (Djimon Hounsou) apparenting prominently. The Kree Empire is stated to have just signed a peace treaty with the Nova Corps of Xandar, thereby ending a centuries-long war between the two races. This treaty prompts Ronan to embark on a genocidal campaign against the Xandarians.

The Kree briefly appear in the 2017 film Guardians of the Galaxy Vol 2, where their planet Hala was nearly destroyed by Ego.

The Kree appear in the 2019 film Captain Marvel. Pace and Hounsou reprise their roles as Ronan and Korath, and are joined by Jude Law as Yon-Rogg, Gemma Chan as Minn-Erva, Algenis Perez Soto as Att-Lass, and Rune Temte as Bron-Char, who are members of the Kree military team Starforce. Mar-Vell and the Supreme Intelligence also appear in the film, both played by Annette Bening. Yon-Rogg came to Earth when the Kree discovered that Mar-Vell was working on a light-speed engine experiment and harboring a group of Skrulls. When Mar-Vell died in a crash with Carol Danvers and Yon-Rogg arrived, Danvers shot the engine and was exposed to its energies. After a blood transfusion from Yon-Rogg, Danvers' memories of her life on Earth were lost and she came to work for Yon-Rogg and the Supreme Intelligence. In the present, Danvers regains her memories and battles the Kree forces, which results in most of them either being killed or incapacitated.

The Kree Dar-Benn appeared in The Marvels as the film's main antagonist, battling against Carol Danvers, Kamala Khan and Monica Rambeau sometime after the former had shut down the Supreme Intelligence.

=== Television ===
- The Kree appear in a flashback in the Fantastic Four episode "Inhumans Saga: Beware the Hidden Land".
- The Kree appear in X-Men: The Animated Series.
- The Kree appear in Silver Surfer.
- The Kree, most notably Ronan the Accuser and the Supreme Intelligence, appear in the Fantastic Four: World's Greatest Heroes episode "Trial by Fire".
- The Kree appear in The Avengers: Earth's Mightiest Heroes. The featured Kree are Mar-Vell, Yon-Rogg, Ronan the Accuser, Kalum Lo, and the Supreme Intelligence. In the episode "459", they send one of their sentries to defang Earth as it is useful as a strategic outpost in their war with the Skrulls. After being attacked by Ant-Man, Wasp, and Carol Danvers, the Sentry attempts to activate a Kree nega-bomb and wipe out humanity. This is prevented by Iron Man, Thor, and Mar-Vell, a captain in the Kree Navy's science division who intends to protect humanity. In the second season, the Avengers and Mar-Vell shut down the Supreme Intelligence, with Mar-Vell planning to lead the Kree into a new era of peace.
- The Kree appear in Hulk and the Agents of S.M.A.S.H. The featured Kree are Ronan the Accuser and the Supreme Intelligence.
- The Kree appear in Guardians of the Galaxy. Known Kree are Ronan the Accuser, Korath the Pursuer, the Supreme Intelligence, Wraith, Phyla-Vell, and Doctor Minerva.
- The Kree appear in the Avengers Assemble episode "Captain Marvel".

=== Video games ===
- The Kree appear in Marvel: Ultimate Alliance.
- The Kree appear in Marvel Avengers Alliance.
- The Kree appear in Marvel Strike Force.
- The Kree appear in Guardians of the Galaxy: The Telltale Series.
