= Justice (New Universe) =

Publication information
- Publisher: Marvel Comics
- First appearance: Justice #1 (November 1986)
- Created by: Archie Goodwin

In-story information
- Alter ego: John Roger Tensen
- Team affiliations: Forsaken; NSA; DEA
- Notable aliases: Net Prophet, the Prophet of Thor, the Justice Killer, Justice Warrior Tensen
- Abilities: Ability to create psionic "shields" and psionic "swords" Ability to read auras

Justice (John Roger Tensen) is a fictional character appearing in American comic books published by Marvel Comics. The character appeared in the New Universe imprint of Marvel Comics, primarily as the protagonist of a 32-issue comic book series of the same name published from 1986 to 1989. Most of its run was written by Peter David and penciled by Lee Weeks, though it also featured rare 1980s Marvel work from Keith Giffen. David later reintroduced Justice as a supporting character in Spider-Man 2099, a series with a very different setting. This version of the character, also known as the Net Prophet, was older and had different powers.

In 2007, the New Universe concepts were also revived, in a modified form, as a single-title ongoing series, newuniversal. A new version of John Tensen is one of the main characters featured in that series and two other characters with 'Justice' powers have also appeared.

This is a different character from the Justice of Marvel's standard Marvel Universe continuity, belonging instead as per the Official Handbook of the Marvel Universe: Alternate Universes 2005 to Earth-148611 (the New Universe).

== Publication history ==
Justice was one of four New Universe titles created by Archie Goodwin, who also wrote the first issue of the series. The original premise didn't fit well with the central concept of the New Universe: as a visitor from another dimension, Justice contradicted the rule that there had been no superhumans before the White Event, and the fact that this other dimension was peopled by a race biologically identical to humans, who all spoke English, and who lived in a society closely resembling a romanticized Medieval Europe, overrode the New Universe's advertised basis in realism.

The first regular creative team on Justice consisted of Steve Englehart (writer), Geoff Isherwood (penciler, occasional writer), and Vincent Colletta (inker). Isherwood had been suggested for the series by editor-in-chief Jim Shooter. However, only Colletta stayed on past issue #8, with Gerry Conway taking on writing chores and Keith Giffen becoming the penciler. This team lasted only three issues, and was unable to finish the story arc begun back in issue #1. With no new creative team ready, the series went over to fill-in issues for the next three months. Despite this, Justice was one of four New Universe titles (along with Psi-Force, D.P. 7 and Star Brand) to survive beyond the line's first year.

Issue #15 introduced the new creative team of Peter David and Lee Weeks, and presented a wholesale retcon which revealed that almost all of the events of the past 14 issues had been a hallucination created by a comatose paranormal, and that Justice was actually a normal human, not from another dimension. This retcon, which was conceived by D.P. 7 writer Mark Gruenwald to bring Justice into line with the New Universe concept, allowed David to introduce an entirely new cast of characters in issue #16, along with a new costume for Justice. Only the title character's "sword" and "shield" powers and general likeness were retained from the series' first 14 issues. In issue #22 John Tensen joins the National Security Council, and Justice became essentially a team book, with the title character working alongside paranormals such as Playback and Kleenex.

For the last year that they were published, the New Universe comics switched to direct sales format only. Justice was cancelled with issue #32.

Justice later appeared (in his original costume) in Quasar and Starblast. In March 2006, Marvel Comics released a Justice special as part of the "Untold Tales of the New Universe" event. This issue, written by David, ostensibly takes place between Justice #16 and 18, but is inconsistent with the series canon.

== Fictional character biography ==
Justice was a middle-aged DEA agent named John Tensen, whose wife was killed by vengeful members of organized crime. He was undercover at the time of the "White Event", investigating Daedalus Darquill and his son Damon Conquest, who were running drugs out of their front company, Conquest Dynamics. He begins experiencing headaches as his psionic powers manifest. Eventually his cover is blown, and Darquill uses his own newfound parability to remake himself, Tensen, and the others around him into characters from a fantasy dimension, the "Far Place". Tensen's new identity is that of a law-enforcing knight called a "Justice Warrior", who was having an illicit affair with Queen Endolana of the Land of Spring when he was exiled to Earth.

As a Justice Warrior, Tensen has a self-assured, black-and-white sense of right and wrong, supported by his ability to see people's inner auras and thus determine at a glance whether they are good or evil; it is never revealed whether Darquill was able to give him this power for real or the power of suggestion convinced Tensen that he was seeing people's auras, with a combination of simple observation and luck contributing to its accuracy. Using his normal paranormal powers, he almost invariably executes people with evil auras, even if they surrender. His primary mission is to stop Darquill and Conquest, who in Darquill's fantasy are evil wizards from the Land of Winter. He learns Earth's ways while befriending Rebecca Chambers, a DEA agent with a "golden aura" denoting utmost purity, and Arnie, a cab driver. He battles Hounds, soulless creatures created by Darquill. Eventually, Chambers is brainwashed by the Wizards of Winter against Justice. This helps Damon to manipulate Justice into deep despair and anger, and these dire emotions feed a machine constructed by the Wizards to destroy Spring. The wizard Webstral escapes to Earth and, as he tells of Spring's fall and the king's death, heals Justice of the impurity caused by his earlier injuries before perishing.

Before he can return to liberate the land of Spring, Justice finds himself tormented by memories of his real past as John Tensen. He turns to dream therapist Keith Remsen. Darquill sends Chambers to kill them, and Justice is forced to kill her in their defense. He travels to the Far Place and kills Conquest before Darquill again banishes him to Earth. By this time, Remsen has determined that the Far Place is entirely constructed by a comatose Darquill, and shows his sleeping body to Justice as proof. Against Remsen's warnings, Justice kills Darquill in his sleep; this destroys his identity as the Justice Warrior and leaves only John Tensen. Afterwards, Remsen spends months honing Tensen's mental defenses so that he will never again be enthralled. However, whenever Tensen is drugged or fatigued these defenses are weakened, and he once again retreats into his "Justice Warrior" persona, suffering severe audiovisual hallucinations.

No longer able to see good and evil auras, Tensen's ability to see the distinct aura of a paranormal surfaces, and he turns to executing paranormals who abuse their abilities, leaving only his victims' heads and hands intact and drawing the scales of justice in their ashes. He becomes known as "The Justice Killer" by newspapers. During this time, his interest is captured by Miriam Morse, a.k.a. Playback, a psychic who can replay images of crime scenes. The authorities, including the National Security Agency, pursue and catch Justice at Pitt-Aid, a benefit concert. Remembering his roots as an agent for the Department of Justice, Tensen agrees to serve as a special operative of the NSA. They reintroduce him to Playback, now one of his co-agents, and his teenage daughter, Angela, who has the paranormal ability to reanimate the dead. As his first assignment, the NSA tells him to deal with a gang of vigilantes who emulate him. An order from Justice for them to cease their activities is misinterpreted, and they commit mass suicide. This tragedy helps to convince Tensen to end his "Justice Killer" doings and to temper his justice with mercy.

The NSA comes into conflict with Judge Mental, leader of the Forsaken, a group of freakish paranormals hiding at Coney Island. One of Judge Mental's agents blows up NSA headquarters. Tensen kills Judge Mental and his right-hand man, Seraph. Along with Angie and her boyfriend, Victor "Kleenex" Pasko, he then presides over the Forsaken in Judge Mental's place.

== Powers and abilities ==
Justice was able to create a personal force-field with his left hand (which he referred to as his "shield") and fire a deadly blast of energy with his right (his "sword"). Furthermore, he was able to see people's auras and thereby judge instantly whether they were inherently good or evil (this being the primary reason for his draconian morality, though later it was said he could mainly read paranormals). In addition, he was a master of hand-to-hand combat and could apparently heal severe injuries by concentrating. At one point, he apparently regenerated his right hand over a period of one month after it had been lost in a fight with one of Darquill's creatures; however, for a time his "sword" no longer functioned reliably. Since Justice never performed such a feat after his illusions were dispelled, and since these events happened during the period Justice had trouble differentiating fantasy from reality, it is unknown whether this power, too, was an illusion.

Later, when Justice surfaced in the Marvel Universe of 2099, his powers changed drastically. Gone were his trademark psionic "sword" and "shield", replaced by Optic Beams, and Spatial Translocation powers that required his hands be freed.

The newuniversal version of Justice also has different abilities; he appears to possess a limited form of telepathy, allowing him to read misdeeds from someone else's mind. He also manifests solid constructs made from glowing energy; these appear as either flat, rectangular panels which he uses as shields or platforms, or angular shapes which he uses as cutting blades. He also possesses matter displacement abilities and seemingly vanishes and reappears at will wherever he so chooses.

== Other versions ==
=== Marvel 2099 ===
Despite the collapse of the New Universe, Peter David retained a fondness for the character, and in late 1993 re-introduced a version of Justice in the Marvel 2099 line's Spider-Man 2099 comic book as the "Net Prophet", a.k.a. the Prophet of Thor. He appeared from a portal into a dimension 2099 scientist Jordan Boone dubbed "Virtual Unreality", from whence also came Thanatos, an alternate-timeline version of Rick Jones in search of powerful relics from other worlds. Although Tensen claimed to remember Thanatos, the events surrounding any such encounter are unclear. Tensen began his life in 2099 as an amnesiac, and with minutely altered powers. He and Spider-Man defeated Thanatos, then Tensen had adventures of his own, confronting similar themes of hero worship as on his Earth. Keeping near the Church of St. Patrick in New York's Downtown area, he befriended and later romanced Jennifer D'Angelo, a priest at the church and sister to Spider-Man's fiancee, Dana. When last seen in 2099, Tensen had remembered his real name and met Spider-Man's former girlfriend, Xina Kwan, who was then leaving New York City for parts unknown. He joined her, and in that particular timeline, neither was seen again.

=== Exiles ===
A version of Justice, along with many other characters from the New Universe, has appeared in Exiles as part of their "World Tour" story arc. The Justice depicted in this storyline is as the character originally appeared, still believing to be a warrior of another dimension. In this story, Justice battled Kevin MacTaggert, the mutant called Proteus (possessing the body of Mimic), in order to thwart his attempts to possess the Star Brand. He lost the battle, and Proteus possessed him, in addition of discovering Justice's true backstory. In a scenario similar to the events which brought Tensen to 2099 on Earth-928, Proteus and Justice arrived via Alchemax scientist Jordan Boone's Virtual Unreality portal. His body degenerating due to Proteus' abilities, he allied himself with Boone long enough to find a suitable replacement host: John Eisenhart, the Hulk of 2099. The Tensen of this divergent timeline apparently perished, his life force spent by the powerful mutant.

=== newuniversal ===
The re-imagined New Universe called newuniversal presents three different versions of Justice:

- John Tensen becomes Justice when the White Event in 2006 grants him the Justice glyph. John is a well known and respected NYPD detective who, having no family, has completely dedicated himself to his job. John and his partner are involved in a shootout, and the very same bullet that kills his partner lodges in his brain, sending him into a coma (declared "98% dead"). John is a deeply disturbed individual, having gone insane by having effectively died and been resurrected by the Justice glyph. He fully believes that he is dead and that he has been sent to hell, which has been made to look like New York. Further, the city has been completely populated by sinners. He takes it upon himself to kill them, cleansing hell. By the end of newuniversal: shockfront #1, John has fallen completely into his delusion, and is seen sitting amongst his latest victims, talking to both them and to himself. John is in shock, saying that they (his latest victims) were worse than anything he had found in two weeks of killing. John is too afraid to see if hell is larger than Manhattan, demanding that the dead bodies tell him how to kill more of them quicker.
- Veronica Kelly was granted the Justice glyph during the failed White Event called The FireWorks, and is introduced in the newuniversal: 1959 one-shot. Veronica Kelly is a resident of Kansas City and the widow of a police officer who was killed by a corrupt colleague. Veronica is one of three people who become superhuman as a result of the Fireworks in April 1953, gaining the Justice glyph. Kelly's powers were portrayed slightly differently from John Tensen's, forming energy blades in the shape of scissors and knives. Although she evidently had a similar ability to see a person's guilt in their aura, newuniversal: 1959 does not show her manifesting any energy shields.
- Ukru is newuniversal's first Justice, having gained the glyph in 2689BCE, some years after the first failed White Event, and is introduced in the newuniversal: conqueror one-shot. Conqueror details the events surrounding the first superhumans, explaining that Ukru helped found the Latvian city of Zardath, which is ruled by Starr the Slayer, bearer of the Starbrand. Ukru's mind has collapsed and he is being used as a hunting animal - drugged on "poppybrew", chained, controlled by handlers, and left to sleep in an "ice-engine" device when he is not required. It is later revealed that his mind has been deliberately destroyed by the city's Nightmask, Trull, who has been using Ukru to locate and abduct other superhumans before they can join Zardath. Ukru is a giant of a man, far taller than the other inhabitants of Zardath - large enough to grasp someone around the waist with one hand. It is never explicitly stated that this is due to the damage that Trull has done to his mind, but Trull's other superhuman victims are physically mutated by their uncontrolled powers after their minds are drained and Ukru is the only Justice to be transformed in this way. It is possible that Ukru is meant to be similar to Mastodon, the giant muscular team-mate of New Universe's DP7. Maintaining the shield part of his energy powers, Ukru utilizes them in order to create blue energy limbs to act as an accelerated mode of transportation to cover greater distances than he normally would on foot.

== In other media ==
=== Psi-Man references ===
A version of Justice's story completed itself in the 1992 novel, Psi-Man, Book 6: Haven, published by Diamond Books. Original Justice series writer Peter David wrote the novel under the pseudonym of David Peters. The novel's protagonist, Chuck Simon, possessed superhuman mental powers; as such, he was constantly chased by government operatives. In the finale of the six-book series, Simon arrived at Coney Island for a final showdown. For legal reasons, David could not use the name or likeness of Tensen, so instead he tweaked the character's name and role, inventing the character of Tom Jensen, a.k.a. The Magistrate, who presided over freakish superhuman beings at the former Coney Island amusement park circa 2021. With some deviations, Jensen shared most of the abilities and some history with his Marvel Comics counterpart. Jensen allied himself with Simon and saved his life, dying in the process.

The entire Psi-Man novel series was re-released in 2000 by Ace Books in new editions under David's real name.

== Writers ==
- Archie Goodwin - Justice #1 (November 1986)
- Steve Englehart - Justice #2-5, 7 (December 1986-March 1987, May 1987)
- Geof Isherwood - Justice #6, 8 (April 1987, June 1987)
- Gerry Conway - Justice #9-11 (July 1987-September 1987) (Note: Justice #13 credits Conway as writer, Giffen as penciler, and Colletta as inker, but it is easily recognizable that the script is not Conway's and the pencils are not Giffen's. The crediting is presumably a clerical error, since Conway/Giffen/Colletta was the regular creative team on issues #9-11.)
- Dan Chichester - Justice #12 (October 1987)
- Margaret Clark - Justice #12 (October 1987)
- Sandy Plunkett - Justice #14 (December 1987)
- Mark Gruenwald - Justice #15 (Plot) (January 1988)
- Peter David - Justice #15-32 (January 1988-June 1989), Untold Tales of the New Universe: Justice #1 (May 2006)
- Gregory Wright - "Madman II" in The Star Brand #18 (March 1989) [back-up story]

== Pencilers ==
- Geof Isherwood - Justice #1-3, 6-8 (November 1986-January 1987, April 1987-June 1987)
- Joe Staton - Justice #4 (February 1987)
- Tom Morgan - Justice #5 (March 1987)
- Tony Salmons - Justice #5 (March 1987)
- Keith Giffen - Justice #9-11 (July 1987-September 1987)
- Tom Grindberg - Justice #12 (October 1987)
- Dave Hoover - Justice #14 (December 1987)
- Lee Weeks - Justice #15-23, 25-27, 29-31 (January 1988-September 1988, November 1988-January 1989, March 1989-May 1989)
- Michael Gustovich - Justice #24, 28 (October 1988, February 1989)
- Alan Kupperberg - Justice #32 (June 1989)
- Kieron Dwyer - "Madman II" in The Star Brand #18 (March 1989) [back-up story]
- Carmine Di Giandomenico - Untold Tales of the New Universe: Justice #1 (May 2006)
- John Stanisci - Untold Tales of the New Universe: Justice #1 (May 2006)

== Cover art ==
- Geof Isherwood - Justice #1-2, 4-9 (November 1986-December 1986, February 1987-July 1987)
- Javier Saltares - Justice #3 (January 1987)
- Tom Grindberg - Justice #10-12 (August 1987-October 1987)
- Tom Morgan - Justice #13 (November 1987)
- Sandy Plunkett - Justice #14 (December 1987)
- Lee Weeks - Justice #15-25, 27-32 (January 1988-November 1988, January 1989-June 1989)
