= Spitfire (New Universe) =

Spitfire and the Troubleshooters
- Issue #1 cover

Publication information
- Publisher: Marvel Comics
- Schedule: Monthly
- Format: Ongoing series
- Publication date: October 1986 - October 1987
- No. of issues: 13
- Main character: Professor Jenny Swensen

Creative team
- Created by: Eliot R. Brown; Jack Morelli

Spitfire and the Troubleshooters (renamed Spitfire with issue #8 and Codename: Spitfire with issue #10) is a short-lived comic book series from Marvel Comics' New Universe line. It followed "Spitfire" (Professor Jenny Swensen) and a group of brilliant but eccentric college students as they used high-tech powered exoskeletons to combat the mysterious terrorist organization called The Club.

Following the series' cancellation, Swensen was redesigned as the armor-skinned paranormal Chrome, and became a regular character in DP7.

A different version of the character – Dr. Jennifer Swann – was introduced in 2007 as part of Warren Ellis' newuniversal, a single-title reworking of the New Universe concepts.

== Publication history ==
Spitfire and the Troubleshooters was created for the New Universe line by Eliot R. Brown and Jack Morelli. Brown recalls that it was Morelli who first came up with the idea of doing the series. On Spitfire's conception, Brown commented: "It was more than Iron Girl, it was a different technological attitude, more reality-based. Iron Man was not unreal, but Iron Man as a concept did too much. Even in the 1980s, the suit was so smart, it could have gone off and had its own adventures. I tried to do something that was more of a garbage can with legs and a good brain in it, something more mechanical". The concept of the Troubleshooters was based on a series of escapades Brown shared with a childhood friend, a student at the Massachusetts Institute of Technology, while visiting him at the MIT campus in the mid-1970s.

Brown and Morelli wanted to write Spitfire and the Troubleshooters themselves, going so far as to take reference photos of the MIT campus and petitioning for Herb Trimpe to be the series artist. However, when Brown approached Bob Harras to turn in the first half of the script for issue #1, he saw that Harras had already accepted a completed script from Gerry Conway. Issues #4 and 5 saw dramatic turns in the series plot, as Fritz Kroetze (originally marked as the main villain of the series) is killed off, and the Spitfire armor is destroyed, leaving protagonist Jenny Swensen an ordinary human. Conway remained the regular writer until issue #6, which he co-wrote with his replacement, Cary Bates.

Bates immediately restructured the series, eliminating the Troubleshooters, taking away Swensen's vocation as a teacher, introducing a new supporting cast of government operatives, and generally replacing the concept of Spitfire and the Troubleshooters with a new espionage series, Codename: Spitfire. Issue #10 saw the completion of this metamorphosis, but was also the final issue of Bates's brief run. A single-issue stint by Fabian Nicieza saw Swensen don a new Spitfire armor, and the series closed out with two fill-in issues. Mediocre sales placed Codename: Spitfire among the four New Universe titles to be cancelled at the end of its first year.

An eight-page Spitfire solo story was printed in February 2006 as a backup story in Amazing Fantasy #19 as part of the Untold Tales of the New Universe event, which was created to commemorate the twentieth anniversary of the New Universe. The story is set a few weeks before Spitfire and the Troubleshooters #1.

== Writers ==
- Eliot R. Brown – Spitfire and the Troubleshooters #1 (plot) (October 1986)
- Gerry Conway – Spitfire and the Troubleshooters #1–6 (October 1986 – March 1987)
- Jack Morelli – Spitfire and the Troubleshooters #1 (plot) (October 1986)
- Roy Thomas – Spitfire and the Troubleshooters #5 (February 1987)
- Cary Bates – Spitfire and the Troubleshooters #6–10 (March 1987 – July 1987)
- Fabian Nicieza – Codename: Spitfire #11 (August 1987); "The Sublet" in Psi-Force #20 (June 1988) [back-up story]; "The Travest Termination" in Justice #28 (February 1989) [back-up story]
- Len Kaminski – Codename: Spitfire #12 (September 1987)
- Sandy Plunkett – Codename: Spitfire #13 (October 1987)

== Art ==
- Herb Trimpe – Spitfire and the Troubleshooters #1–2, 5 (October and November 1986, February 1987)
- Ron Wagner – Spitfire and the Troubleshooters #3 (December 1986)
- Todd McFarlane – Spitfire and the Troubleshooters #4 (January 1987)
- Vincent Giarrano – Spitfire and the Troubleshooters #6 (March 1987)
- Alan Kupperberg – Spitfire and the Troubleshooters #7–9 (April 1987 – June 1987)
- Marshall Rogers – Codename: Spitfire #10 (July 1987)
- Grant Miehm – Codename: Spitfire #11 (August 1987)
- Javier Saltares – Codename: Spitfire #12 (September 1987)
- Dave Hoover – Codename: Spitfire #13 (October 1987)
- Sandy Plunkett – Codename: Spitfire #13 (October 1987)
- Mark Bagley – "Healing Time" in Psi-Force #20 (June 1988) [back-up story]
- Donald C. Hudson – "The Travest Termination" in Justice #28 (February 1989) [back-up story]

== Other versions ==
=== newuniversal – Dr. Jennifer Swann ===
An alternate version of Jenny Swensen is introduced as Dr. Jennifer Swann in Warren Ellis' re-imagining of New Universe, newuniversal. Swann works for Project Spitfire, continuing her father's work on the H.E.X. (Human Enhancement eXperimental) Initiative, working to create a robotic battle suit. In the wake of the White Event and police reports regarding Kenneth Connell, Swann's supervisor Philip Voight informs her that H.E.X funding has been increased by a factor of twenty and that the true mandate of Project Spitfire is to monitor or kill all superhumans. Swann is later granted the Cipher glyph, becoming one of the superhumans she was tasked to hunt down and kill.

=== Exiles ===
An alternate version of Spitfire was rescued (and later recruited) by Quentin Quire, as part of Quire's version of the Exiles, in which the team helped the surviving heroes battled the Annihilation Wave that was led by a banished Hulk.
