= Cary Bates =

American writer

- Born: 1948 (age 77–78) Pennsylvania, U.S.
- Area: Writer
- Notable works: Action Comics; Captain Atom; The Flash; Superboy; Superman

Cary Bates (born 1948) is an American comic book, animation, television and film writer. He is best known for his work on The Flash, Superman, Superboy, Legion of Super-Heroes, and Captain Atom. Bates is the longest-serving Superman writer, at twenty years.

== Biography ==
=== Early career ===
A native of Philadelphia, Bates began submitting ideas for comic book covers to DC Comics at the age of 13, and a number of them were bought and published, the first as the cover to Superman #167 (Feb. 1964). Bates began to sell stories to DC when he was a college freshman at Ohio University.

Bates is best known for his work for DC Comics on such titles as Action Comics, Captain Atom, The Flash, Superboy and the Legion of Super-Heroes, and Superman. He began working for the publisher in 1963 and continued to do so until the early 1990s. Among his contributions to the Superman mythos, he and artist Curt Swan co-created the supervillains Terra-Man and the 1970s version of the Toyman as well as the superhero Vartox. In November 1972, Bates and artist Art Saaf launched the first Supergirl series. Bates wrote two stories which featured a superhero wedding. In Superboy Starring the Legion of Super-Heroes #200 (Feb. 1974), the characters Bouncing Boy and Duo Damsel were married and Justice League of America #121 (Aug. 1975) featured the marriage of Adam Strange and the character's longstanding love interest Alanna. Superman #300 (June 1976) featured an out-of-continuity story by Bates and Elliot S. Maggin which imagined the infant Superman landing on Earth in 1976 and becoming a superhero in 2001. The tale was an inspiration for Mark Millar's Superman: Red Son limited series published in 2003. Bates would end the marriage of another character when he wrote The Flash #275 (July 1979) wherein the title character's wife, Iris West, was killed.

Bates appeared in his own comics as himself several times, alongside superheroes such as the Silver Age version of the Flash and the Justice League of America.

=== 1980s ===
Bates and artist Kurt Schaffenberger were the creative team for The New Adventures of Superboy, a series debuting in January 1980, which took the character out of the Legion of Super-Heroes and back into solo adventures. He and artist Carmine Infantino crafted a Batman backup story for Detective Comics #500 (March 1981). Infantino returned to The Flash title with issue #296 (April 1981) and he and Bates collaborated on the series, including issue #300 (Aug. 1981) which was in the Dollar Comics format, until its cancellation with issue #350 (October 1985). A major shakeup occurred when The Flash would inadvertently kill his wife's murderer, the Reverse-Flash, in The Flash #324 (Aug. 1983). This led to an extended storyline titled "The Trial of the Flash" in which the Flash faces the repercussions of his actions. Bates became the editor as well as the writer of The Flash title during this time and oversaw it until its cancellation in 1985. "The Trial of the Flash" was collected in a volume of the Showcase Presents series in 2011.

His final Superman stories were "Trapped in IMP-TV" in Superman #421 and "Superman for a Day" in Action Comics #581 (both cover dated July 1986). Bates was one of the contributors to the DC Challenge limited series in 1986. In 1987 and 1988, he wrote some stories for Marvel Comics' New Universe line and created the Video Jack series at Epic Comics with Keith Giffen. His post-Superman work for DC included a Captain Atom series with Pat Broderick and the Silverblade limited series with Gene Colan.

=== Later career and other work ===
His other work includes the comic strips The Lone Ranger (1980–1983), and Buck Rogers in the 25th Century (1981–1983).

Cary Bates was head scriptwriter on the 1988–1992 live action Superboy television series, and co-wrote (with Mario Puzo and John Briley) the 1992 film Christopher Columbus: The Discovery, produced by Superman: The Movie producers Alexander and Ilya Salkind. He also wrote for Disney's Gargoyles during the 1990s and acted as story editor for the series.

In 2008 he returned after a 20-year absence to Marvel and wrote True Believers, a limited series about a team trying to uncover secrets in the Marvel Universe.

Bates made a return to writing Superman, this time as an Elseworlds story titled Superman: The Last Family of Krypton, published in August 2010. Bates worked on the DC Comics nostalgic event DC Retroactive writing stories for the one-shot specials DC Retroactive: Flash - The '70s (with art by Benito Gallego and Sal Buscema), and DC Retroactive: JLA - The '70s (drawn by Gordon Purcell and Andy Smith), both released with September 2011 cover dates.

In 2017, Bates returned to the character Captain Atom and wrote The Fall and Rise of Captain Atom #1–6 together with co-writer Greg Weisman who had also worked with him on many issues of the 1980s Captain Atom series.

In 2023, Bates was interviewed about his career by writer Mark Millar for his YouTube series about comic book creators.

== Bibliography ==
Comics work includes:

=== Continuity Comics ===
- Toyboy #2–6 (1987–1988)

=== DC Comics ===
- Action Comics (Superman): #354, 356, 358, 366–370, 383–390, 392, 401, 403, 405, 407–408, 410, 412, 414–416, 419, 421–423, 425–428, 430–435, 438–439, 441–442, 444–446, 450, 453–454, 456, 460–466, 468–476, 480–485, 487–499, 501–512, 544, 548–549, 581 (1967–1986)
- Adventure Comics (Supergirl): #381–382, 384, 386, 388–389, 391–392, 394, 396; (Vigilante): #426–427; (The Flash): #459–466 (1969–1979)
- Captain Atom #1–46, 50, Annual #1–2 (1987–1991)
- DC Challenge #11 (1986)
- DC Comics Presents #10–11, 15, 73, 82 (1979–1985)
- DC Comics Presents: Hawkman #1 (2004)
- DC Retroactive: The Flash - The '70s (2011)
- DC Retroactive: JLA - The '70s (2011)
- DC Science Fiction Graphic Novel #2 (Nightwings) (1985)
- DC Special Series (The Flash): #1, 11; (Superman): #5 (1977–1978)
- DC Super Stars #12 (1977)
- Detective Comics #500 (1981)
- The Fall and Rise of Captain Atom #1–6 (2017)
- The Flash #179, 206, 209–212, 216, 218–292, 294–305, 307–312, 314–350 (1968–1985)
- Hercules Unbound #10–12 (1977)
- Heroes Against Hunger #1 (among others) (1986)
- House of Mystery #240, 282 (1976–1980)
- House of Secrets #144 (1977)
- Justice League of America #116, 120–121, 123–124, 138–139 (1975–1977)
- The New Adventures of Superboy #1–23, 26–30, 32–33 (1980–1982)
- New Guardians #2–12 (1988–1989)
- Secret Origins vol. 2 #34, 40 (1988–1989)
- Silverblade #1–12 (1987–1988)
- Strange Sports Stories #4 (1974)
- Superboy (Superboy): #148; (Legion of Super-Heroes): #173, 183–184, 188, 190–193, 195, 197–209, 211, 214–216, 218, 220, 222 (1965–1976)
- Supergirl #1–4, 7–10 (1972–1974)
- Superman #198, 200–201, 204, 209, 213, 214, 219, 221, 223, 230–231, 238, 240, 243, 246, 249–250, 255–259, 261, 263–264, 269, 275, 278–279, 281, 283–284, 288–289, 291, 294, 296–300, 327, 329, 353–369, 372–375, 379–386, 388–392, 401–402, 410, 412–413, 415, 418, 421, Annual #9, 12 (1967–1986)
- The Superman Family #166, 169–173, 176–183, 195–198 (1974–1979)
- Superman's Girl Friend, Lois Lane #96, 108–109, 112, 120–121, 123–127, 130–132, 134–137 (1969–1974)
- Superman's Pal Jimmy Olsen #107, 109, 111, 157 (1967–1973)
- Superman Movie Special #1 (Superman III adaptation) (1983)
- Superman Special #2 (1983)
- Superman: The Last Family of Krypton, #1–3 (2010)
- V #1–6, 9–16 (1985–1986)
- Weird Western Tales #12–13, 15–17, 19 (1972–1973)
- Wonder Woman #206, 213, 215 (1973–1975)
- Wonder Woman vol. 2 #26 (1989)
- World's Finest Comics #151, 167–169, 174, 176, 178, 180–182, 184, 189–191 (1965–1970)

=== Marvel Comics ===
- Codename: Spitfire #10 (1987)
- Fantastic Four Cosmic-Size Special #1 (2009)
- Nightmask #3, 5 (1987)
- Spitfire and the Troubleshooters #6–9 (1987)
- Star Brand #8–9 (1987)
- True Believers 1–5 (2008–2009)
- Video Jack #1–6 (1987–1988)

=== Warren Publishing ===
- Creepy #83, 89, 92, 95, 99–100, 102, 109–111 (1976–1979)
- Eerie #81, 96, 99–105, 107–109, 117 (1977–1980)
- Vampirella #59, 67, 75, 79–80, 82, 111 (1977–1983)

== Screenwriting credits ==
=== Television ===
- Jem (1988)
- Superboy (1989)
- Gargoyles (1995–1997)
- Bureau of Alien Detectors (1996)
- Mummies Alive! (1997)
- RoboCop: Alpha Commando (1998–1999)
- Roughnecks: Starship Troopers Chronicles (1999)
- Max Steel (2000)
- W.I.T.C.H. (2005–2006)

=== Film ===
- Christopher Columbus: The Discovery (1992)

Preceded by Leo Dorfman	Action Comics writer 1972–1980	Succeeded by Marv Wolfman
Preceded by Robert Kanigher	The Flash writer 1971–1985	Succeeded by Mike Baron (The Flash vol.2)
Preceded by Elliot S! Maggin	Superman writer 1974–1976	Succeeded by Gerry Conway
Preceded by Dennis O'Neil	Justice League of America writer 1975	Succeeded by Elliot S! Maggin
Preceded by Gerry Conway	Superman writer 1980–1984	Succeeded by Elliot S! Maggin and Bob Rozakis
Preceded by n/a	Captain Atom writer 1987–1991	Succeeded by Kelly Puckett
