= Newuniversal =

Comic book series

newuniversal
- Cover to newuniversal #1.

Publication information
- Publisher: Marvel Comics
- Schedule: Monthly
Title(s)
newuniversal #1-6
newuniversal: shockfront #1-2
newuniversal: 1959 #1
newuniversal: conqueror #1
- Formats: Original material for the series has been published as a set of limited series and one-shot comics.
- Genre: Superhero
- Publication date: February 2007 – October 2008
- Number of issues: newuniversal 6 newuniversal: shockfront 2 newuniversal: 1959; 1 newuniversal: conqueror 1
- Main character(s): Justice; Nightmask; Cipher; Star Brand; Dr. Emmett Proudhawk

Creative team
- Writer(s): newuniversal and newuniversal: shockfront Warren Ellis newuniversal: 1959; Kieron Gillen newuniversal: conqueror Simon Spurrier
- Artist(s): newuniversal Salvador Larroca newuniversal: 1959; Greg Scott; Kody Chamberlain newuniversal: conqueror Eric Nguyen
- Penciller(s): newuniversal: shockfront Steve Kurth
- Inker(s): newuniversal: shockfront Andrew Hennessy
- Colorist(s): Jason Keith

Reprints
- Collected editions
- Everything Went White Premiere: ISBN 0-7851-2858-1
- Everything Went White: ISBN 0-7851-2302-4

newuniversal is a comic book series by writer Warren Ellis, artist Salvador Larroca, and colorist Jason Keith that was published by Marvel Comics. A re-imagining of Marvel's New Universe concepts, the series was launched in 2006 in order to coincide with the twentieth anniversary of the New Universe's creation in 1986.

As with the original New Universe, newuniversal is set in a world where several people suddenly develop superhuman abilities. However, where the New Universe began with the "real" world as its starting point, the world of newuniversal was already markedly different.

== Publication history ==
newuniversal imagines concepts and characters that were introduced as part of Marvel's New Universe series during the 1980s. The New Universe was a set of eight linked titles launched in 1986 to celebrate Marvel's twenty-fifth anniversary, and championed by Marvel's editor-in-chief Jim Shooter. The New Universe comics were not a long-term success, with four titles canceled after a year. The entire line was canceled by the end of 1989.

The original series initially had no links to the shared continuity of the Marvel Universe and did not present traditional superheroes. Instead, the comics offered "the world outside your window," one that was identical to the historical world in every respect until it was suddenly changed by the White Event, a mysterious incident that gifted some humans with inexplicable powers.

Ellis has stated that he believed that "the original creators and editors [had not] realized until it was too late [that] it was all a single story. It shouldn't have been eight books (or whatever) that were eventually consolidated into ensemble miniseries. It was a single story that should have spun new series and serials off of it." Ellis took this approach to newuniversal, with his first storyline intentionally revolving around the four lead books of the original New Universe in Justice, Nightmask, Star Brand, and Spitfire and the Troubleshooters. Among the many changes that newuniversal presents is that the four main characters all possess extra-dimensional glyphs that grant them their powers. As well, the character Spitfire (Professor Jenny Swensen, later known as Chrome) becomes Cipher (Dr. Jennifer Swann).

Artist Salvador Larroca has stated that he "wasn't a big fan" of the original New Universe, while Ellis has mentioned that he had "paid little or no attention" to the New Universe books when they were first published. In December 2006, newuniversal #1 sold out through Diamond Comic Distributors. A second printing was later released with a new variant cover by artist Esad Ribic. newuniversal #2 sold out and Marvel reissued the comic with another second printing, this time with a variant cover by Esad Ribic. After issue #6, newuniversal went on hiatus and Salvador Larroca left the project.

In 2008, the story was continued in a mini-series written by Ellis, newuniversal: shockfront, which was illustrated by penciller Steve Kurth and inker Andrew Hennessy. The shockfront series was accompanied by two one-shot stories exploring the past of the universe in newuniversal: conqueror and newuniversal: 1959.

From the first issue of newuniversal: shockfront onwards, all newuniversal comics included a statement acknowledging that the series is based on original concepts by Jim Shooter, Archie Goodwin, Eliot R. Brown, John Morelli, Mark Gruenwald and Tom DeFalco, some of the creators who worked on the original New Universe comics. In 2009, Warren Ellis reportedly lost his story files in a computer accident; he subsequently announced that the project is "basically dead."

== Setting ==
Writer Warren Ellis describes the setting of newuniversal as "an alternate world where America is somewhat isolationist, Soviet Russia fell apart early and China took the lead in spaceflight"; newuniversal #1 mentions Chinese moonbases, as well as hundreds of flights by Chinese spaceplanes. There are also other, smaller changes to the world's history; for example, Paul McCartney is dead and John Lennon is still alive. Chinese manhua comics have all the market penetration that manga does in the real world. The September 11, 2001 attacks never happened and the World Trade Center towers are still standing in 2006, as seen in newuniversal #1. Hillary Clinton is President of the United States. In Newuniversal: Shockfront #2, Charlotte Yolanda Beck shows how history changed after Richard Nixon won the 1960 election.

Aspects of the wider universe also play a direct role in the setting. The sudden changes to the world are triggered by the Earth's contact with the "newuniversal structure", an artificial web of strange matter. Each strand of the web is several light years across. The structure, assembled by a long-gone race, is mechanical in nature and deliberately alters several sentient beings on each world entering its strands, modifying them to perform specific roles.

Ellis has confirmed that the alternate universe of newuniversal is also part of the larger Marvel Multiverse, designated as Earth-555. This is briefly touched upon in newuniversal #2, with a passing reference to the "Superflow for Universe 555".

The first few issues of newuniversal state specific dates and times for their events, in keeping with the original New Universe concept—and quite different from the established Marvel Universe, where characters do not age in 'real time' and their histories are sometimes updated.

== Characters ==
The main characters of newuniversal are based on the main characters from the original New Universe imprint, although Ellis felt that the New Universe "featured an awful lot of people with similar names, which I found odd -- Swensen, Remsen, Tensen" and some of the newuniversal characters have been renamed to avoid this.

Some of the newuniversal characters are alternate versions of existing Marvel Universe characters, such as Tony Stark, who apparently was among the first to receive hyperscientific powers and built an armored suit to escape Vietnam. Mostly, these are characters who appear as main or supporting characters in other Marvel titles, but fulfill relatively minor roles in the newuniversal plot.

=== White Event Glyph Quartet ===
Four powerful extra-dimensional glyphs (which manifest as tattoos) confer superhuman powers on different sentient beings (who often take on the names of these glyphs). Originally the Starbrand was the only extra-dimensional glyph, but Warren Ellis' re-imagining broadened the concept to allow others to exist: Justice, Cipher, and Nightmask. The purpose of glyphs is to aid in the transition of any given world through the inevitable paradigm shift caused when it comes into contact with the "newuniversal structure", which is a web of strange matter wherein normal physical laws operate differently. Whenever a world enters the web, it can become unstable, taking thousands of years before it finishes traveling along one of its many strands, thus contact implies the danger that any given world could be destroyed if its transition period is not guided.

- Nightmask Glyph: Izanami Randall is a sarcastic Japanese-American woman living in San Francisco. After the White Event, Randall obtains the Nightmask glyph and is contacted by an alien communications station within the superflow, and believed her encounter with it, being the first, to be a dream or drug-induced hallucination. This station explains the nature of the White Event and informs her of the Nightmask's role in the changes that will follow for her world. Her ability to enter and leave the superflow at will lets her travel vast distances, and it is hinted that the superflow's role in human dreaming and creativity allow her power over that domain - periods of scientific and creative growth or stagnation are described as the results of "weather changes" in the universal system.
- Cipher Glyph: Dr. Jennifer Swann is a scientist employed by Project Spitfire, working on a powered exoskeleton battle suit that's intended to enable its wearer to combat superhumans. Prior to the White Event, the work is encountering difficulties, and the suit is only partially functional. Swann herself is transformed into a superhuman by the White Event, and now possesses the ability to interface with some types of technology remotely - something which she conceals from her employers. Once Project Spitfire becomes aware of the Starbrand, Dr. Swann is briefed and informed that superhumans have resurfaced, the H.E.X suit must be built and working, and the new superhumans must be hunted down and killed. Her newfound superhuman abilities let her immediately fix the numerous problems with her H.E.X suit, enabling the creation of a machine designed to hunt superhumans like herself.
- Justice Glyph: John Tensen is a NYPD detective, a man with no family, who is described as "living for the police". The night before the White Event, Tensen is left hospitalized and comatose after a gunshot wound to the head. When the White Event occurs, he suddenly wakes, healed and marked with the lightning-bolt 'Justice' glyph. Tensen immediately realises that he possesses superhuman powers, including the ability to sense a person's guilt and "see" their sins superimposed over his vision. His first act is to execute the nurse who was about to euthanise him. He then tracks down and kills the gang members who shot him, before embarking on a crusade as a vigilante, going so far as to slaughter a crowd of outwardly innocent people after determining that their sins outweigh their lives, and showing no apparent remorse over this act. He has demonstrated marked delusions, stating repeatedly that he believes he is in hell and that the people he kills are merely disguised demons.
- Starbrand Glyph: Kenneth Connell wakes after the White Event to find that his right palm now bears the Starbrand glyph, and that his girlfriend, Maddie, who was with him at the time of the White Event, has been killed as a side-effect of his transformation. Connell is arrested and Maddie's father, the town sheriff, then attempts to execute him, believing that he is responsible for Maddie's death. Connell's abilities activate and he kills the sheriff in self-defense. After escaping, razing the jail in the process, a shocked and half-awake Connell flies to a mountain. He then encounters two Starbrands from alternate universes and a future version of himself. The three explain Connell's new role and Maddie's accidental death, then reveal that he can choose to leave his universe behind or can make a stand against the forces who intend to kill him, and those like him, in order to maintain the status quo.

=== Other characters ===
- Philip L. Voight is the presiding officer of Project Spitfire, part of a government project tasked with monitoring and killing superhumans. He was originally a field operative and later the Director of the project. Before the White Event the government had only encountered three superhumans, created by the "Fireworks" in the 50s. In 1959, Voight was responsible for the deaths of these three, and also killed a baby, the child of two superhumans, in case he had inherited his parents' abilities. He believes that superhumans are inherently a different species, so different from normal humans that there is no hope of a dialogue, and that by their very nature, they will kill humanity and thus must be sterilized to the last.
- Dr Leonard Carson, Dr Hannah Ballad and Jim Braddock are archaeologists, first seen investigating unexplained ancient ruins in Latvia. Later working at an archaeological dig discuss the white event and a landslide, which occurred at the same time, revealing a huge complex tomb. Inside, they find the skeletal remains of the legendary warrior Starr the Slayer and numerous artifacts from the technologically advanced Shining City, including a primitive electric arc light.
- Dr. Emmett Proudhawk is a Native American CIA consultant who, while on a vision quest, is contacted by the Superflow, just as Izanami Randall was.
- Jack Magniconte is a quarterback for the New York Smashers Football team who strikes and kills an opposing player with a single blow during a charity exhibition game. This display of superhuman strength brings him to the attention of Project Spitfire and Philip L. Voight attempts to kill him by detonating a bomb left in a suitcase. It is not known if Magniconte survived the explosion, or if any civilians were harmed in the detonation.

== Creators ==
- Warren Ellis (writer, newuniversal #1–6, newuniversal: shockfront #1–2)
- Salvador Larroca (artist, newuniversal #1–6)
- Steve Kurth (penciller, newuniversal: shockfront #1–2)
- Andrew Hennessy (inker, newuniversal: shockfront #1–2)
- Kieron Gillen (writer, newuniversal: 1959 #1)
- Greg Scott (artist, newuniversal: 1959 #1)
- Kody Chamberlain (artist, newuniversal: 1959 #1)
- Simon Spurrier (writer, newuniversal: conqueror #1)
- Eric Nguyen (artist, newuniversal: conqueror #1)

== Collected editions ==
The initial newuniversal series has been collected into individual volumes:

- newuniversal: Everything Went White (collects newuniversal #1–6, premiere hardcover, August 15, 2007, ISBN 0-7851-2858-1, softcover April 9, 2008, ISBN 161558062X)
