= Dave Hoover =

American comics artist

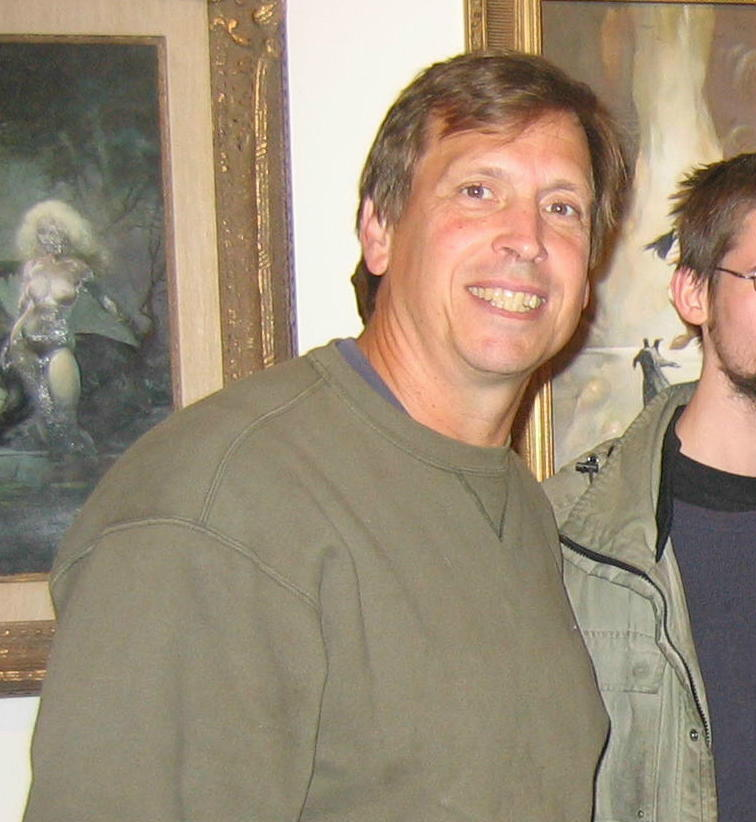
- Born: May 14, 1955 Berrysburg, Pennsylvania
- Died: September 4, 2011 (aged 56) Philadelphia, Pennsylvania
- Areas: Penciller, Inker
- Notable works: Captain America; Starman; The Wanderers

David Harold Hoover (May 14, 1955 – September 4, 2011) was an American comics artist and animator. He was most known for his art on DC Comics' The Wanderers and Starman, and Marvel Comics' Captain America.

== Biography ==
=== Early life ===
Hoover received his B.S. in Media Arts and Animation from the Art Institute of Philadelphia; and his Associate of Specialized Technology in Visual Communication from the Art Institute of Pittsburgh.

=== Career ===
==== Animation ====
Hoover started his career in animation, first as a layout artist for Filmation Studios from 1977–1985. During this time, he also worked for several other animation studios, including Hanna-Barbera and Mihan Productions.

Over his career as an animator, Hoover worked on such programs as Fat Albert and the Cosby Kids, The Archie Show, Tarzan, Lord of the Jungle, The New Adventures of Flash Gordon, He-Man and the Masters of the Universe, She-Ra: Princess of Power, The Super Friends, The Smurfs, Men in Black: The Series, The Godzilla Power Hour, RoboCop: Alpha Commando, and many more.

Hoover worked on two animated feature films, Fire and Ice (1983), the Frank Frazetta-inspired movie; and Starchaser: The Legend of Orin (1985).

In 1997, Hoover worked as a freelance animator for Columbia/Tri Star Children’s TV.

==== Comics ====
From 1987 to 1997, Hoover worked in the comics industry. In addition to his stints on The Wanderers, Starman, and Captain America; Hoover worked on The Amazing Spider-Man, Starman, The Punisher, Tarzan, and The Invaders. In 1995, he drew the first chapter of the "Planet of the Symbiotes" storyline which featured Spider-Man and Venom.

In 2003, he returned to the comics industry with his creator-owned adult series Wilde Knight with co-creator/writer Gary Petras; and in 2004 Hoover joined EAdultComics's lineup of artists. Having established himself as a good girl artist, Hoover's first assignment for the online adult comics publisher was Jungle Love.

Hoover pencilled the interiors of the first three Charmed comics and its prequel which Zenescope began releasing in June 2010.

==== Teaching ====
Hoover was part of the Digital Media faculty at the Art Institute of Philadelphia from 1999 until his death.

=== Personal life ===
Hoover died in September 2011 and was survived by Karen, his wife of 22 years.

== Bibliography ==
=== Basement Comics ===
- Wilde Knight #1 (2003)

=== Comico Comics ===
- Elementals #13 (1990)

=== Continuity Comics ===
- Samuree #8–9 (1990–1991)
- Megalith #8 (1991)

=== DC Comics ===
- Dragonlance #20 (1990)
- Hawk and Dove #13, Annual #1 (1990)
- Starman #26–28, 30–34, 36–37 (1990–1991)
- Star Trek: The Next Generation - Embrace the Wolf (2000)
- TSR Worlds #1 (1990)
- Wanderers #1–13 (1988–1989)
- Who's Who in the DC Universe #2, 11 (1990–1991)
- Who's Who in the Legion of Super-Heroes #2, 7 (1988)
- Who's Who: The Definitive Directory of the DC Universe Update '88 #4 (1988)

=== First Comics ===
- GrimJack #46 (1988)
- Sable #26–27 (1989)

=== Marvel Comics ===
- The Amazing Spider-Man Super Special #1 (1995)
- Captain America #425–443 (1994–1995)
- Codename: Spitfire #13 (1987)
- Conan the Barbarian #253 (1992)
- Cosmic Powers Unlimited #4 (1996)
- Doctor Strange, Sorcerer Supreme Annual #2 (1992)
- Excalibur #40–41 (1991)
- Fantastic Four Unlimited #1 (1993)
- Invaders vol. 2 #1–4 (1993)
- Justice #14 (1987)
- Lunatik #1 (1995)
- Marc Spector: Moon Knight #51 (1993)
- Marvel Comics Presents #83, 102, 123–128, 130–131 (1991–1993)
- Namor, the Sub-Mariner Annual #1 (1991)
- Nick Fury, Agent of S.H.I.E.L.D. #32 (1992)
- Night Thrasher: Four Control #1–4 (1992–1993)
- Punisher #80, Annual #6, Back to School Special #3 (1993–1994)
- Quasar #26–27 (1991)
- Savage Sword of Conan #171 (1990)
- Uncanny Origins #1–3 (1996–1997)
- What If...? vol. 2 #36 (1992)
- What The--?! #9 (1990)
- Wolverine #60 (1992)
