= Nightmask =

Fictional character in Marvel Comics

Publication information
- Publisher: Marvel Comics
- First appearance: Nightmask #1 (November 1986)
- Created by: Archie Goodwin

In-story information
- Alter ego: Keith Remsen
- Species: Paranormal Human
- Abilities: Dream manipulation

Nightmask is a fictional character appearing in American comic books published by Marvel Comics. He was created by writer Archie Goodwin, and first appeared in Nightmask #1 (November 1986), a series which was published under Marvel's New Universe imprint. The 2006 series newuniversal and Marvel's 2012 rebranding, Marvel NOW!, reintroduced the character with different civilian alter egos.

== Publication history ==
The original Nightmask, Keith Remsen, was created by Archie Goodwin (Note: Nightmask #1 erroneously credits Tony Salmons as co-creator. Later publications, such as The Draft and The War, list Goodwin as Nightmask's sole creator.) and first appeared in Nightmask #1 (November 1986), a series which was published under Marvel's New Universe imprint. Remsen is a paranormal, one of the people affected by the "White Event", and has the ability to manifest himself in other people's dreams. Issue #1 was penciled by Tony Salmons, as lobbied for by editor Eliot R. Brown, who later explained: "I thought Tony was the quentisential [sic] dreamscape person because he is the last, best, natural delineator of a Ditko-esque world, aside from Steve himself". Goodwin was the initial writer on the series, but left after issue #4. As a consequence, the 'Gnome' storyline which began in issue #1 was abandoned and subsequently ignored until long after the series' cancellation, finally being resolved in Untold Tales of the New Universe: Nightmask (published in 2006). Like most of the New Universe lineup of 1986-87, Nightmask was unable to secure a stable creative team; one out of every three issues was a fill-in. The series was cancelled after 12 issues, although Remsen continued to feature as a significant New Universe character, with a supporting role (and occasional back-up stories) in other titles.

In 2006, Warren Ellis and Salvador Larroca introduced a different version of the Nightmask character when they revived the New Universe concepts in a new series, newuniversal. Izanami Randall, who first appears in newuniversal #1 (February 2007), is a young Japanese-American woman living in San Francisco. After the White Event, Izanami discovers that she has been appointed as the Nightmask and has gained the power to manipulate the "superflow", a "transuniversal space" through which dreams, ideas and telepathy interact with the physical world.

== Fictional character biography ==
Keith Remsen is an eighteen-year-old whose parents send him to study with Doctor Horst Kleinmann, an expert on dreams. Kleinmann has perfected a way of entering dreams cybernetically, and is worried that Remsen's parents are trying to steal his research. Kleinmann plants a bomb which kills Remsen's parents, paralyzes his little sister Theodora ("Teddy"), and leaves Keith himself in a coma, where he remains until he is awakened by the White Event and his sister calling to him.

After awaking, he gradually discovers that he has the power to enter people's dreams telepathically, which he uses to assist in psychotherapy. His sister Teddy is able to communicate with him while he is in the dream state and serves as his anchor to reality. He also fights Kleinmann in the dreamscape.

After the Black Event, in which the city of Pittsburgh is destroyed, Teddy is left in a coma, and Remsen becomes one of the first paranormally gifted people drafted into the military. His training and abilities earn him a commission and he is assigned to use his abilities to scan paranormal draftees for signs of mental aberration. Without his sister to act as his anchor, his dream self becomes more unhinged until he feels he can no longer tell the sane from the insane. This leads him to approve Harlan Mook, a candidate with a dangerously unstable personality. Mook has a mental breakdown and attempts to assassinate the President of the United States, thwarted only because the unnamed President has developed regenerative abilities.

Remsen enters Teddy's dreams in order to release her from her coma. Though initially his Nightmask persona torments Teddy in the same way it had all the dreamers he treated since the Black Event, Keith's love for his sister overcomes the Nightmask persona, freeing Teddy from her coma and restoring the stability of his powers. Remsen stalks Mook in his dreams, baiting Mook to seek him out personally. Remsen kills Mook with a single gunshot.

== Powers and abilities ==
Nightmask has the ability to enter and manipulate dreams of others. He can project illusions into another person's mind, as well as travel between dimensions to some extent.

== Other versions ==
=== Exiles ===
An alternate version of Keith Remsen attempts to defeat the mutant Proteus within his dreams. The attempt fails and Proteus strikes back - Remsen appears to suffer a heart attack, but is unclear whether he survived.

=== newuniversal ===
The re-imagined New Universe called newuniversal presents two different versions of Nightmask:

- Izanami Randall is a Japanese-American girl living in San Francisco, who gains the Nightmask glyph during the 2006 White Event. Izanami is pulled from the world into a transdimensional space called the superflow by an alien communication station just after receiving the glyph. The station informs her that she is one of the heralds of the paradigm shift which is in progress, sparked by the White Event; specifically, she is this age's Nightmask. It is the purpose of the Nightmask to help smooth the transition period of the paradigm shift due to the inevitable initial chaotic effects.
- Trull is the first Nightmask of the newuniversal imprint, and is introduced in the newuniversal: conqueror one-shot, set in the year 2,689 BCE (some years after the first failed White Event). Trull helped to found Latvian city of Zardath ruled by Starr the Slayer, bearer of the Starbrand. It is revealed that Trull, who might have once been good, is a wholly evil man who plots Starr's death and desires to become king. Trull hunts down other superhumans and drains them of their minds and powers, a process that causes them to be monstrously mutated.

=== Earth-616 ===
A new Nightmask appears on Earth-616 during the Marvel NOW! relaunch. This Nightmask is a dark-skinned, artificial human created by Ex Nihilo. After a fierce battle with the Avengers, Nightmask is taken to Earth and given residence in Avengers Tower.

Nightmask reveals his true name upon Tamara Devoux (the current Captain Universe) deciphering its language, and reveals that the universe is dying, and that the White Event is coming. Nightmask accompanies Captain Universe and the Avengers to the ruins of a college where they encounter a college student who was transformed into Star Brand. Nightmask and Star Brand go on to join the Avengers.

Nightmask next appeared in the six-issue Starbrand & Nightmask comic by Greg Weisman and Domo Stanton.

== Writers ==
- Archie Goodwin - Nightmask #1-2, 4, 8 (November 1986-December 1986, February 1987, June 1987)
- Cary Bates - Nightmask #3, 5 (January 1987, March 1987)
- Dann Thomas - Nightmask #6-7, 10-12 (April 1987-May 1987, August 1987-October 1987)
- Roy Thomas - Nightmask #6-7, 10-12 (April 1987-May 1987, August 1987-October 1987)
- Sandy Plunkett - Nightmask #9 (July 1987)
- David Wohl - "The Real Me" in Justice #25 (November 1988) [back-up story]
- Mark Gruenwald - "Night of the Mask" in D.P. 7 #25 (November 1988) [back-up story]
- Gregory Wright - "Madman" in The Star Brand #16 (November 1988) [back-up story]
- Fabian Nicieza - "Teddy Bare!" in The Star Brand #17 (January 1989) [back-up story]

== Artists ==
- Tony Salmons - Nightmask #1 (November 1986)
- Ernie Colón - Nightmask #2 (December 1986)
- Alex Saviuk - Nightmask #3 (January 1987)
- Ron Wagner - Nightmask #4 (February 1987)
- Arvell Jones - Nightmask #5 (March 1987)
- Javier Saltares - Nightmask #6 (April 1987); "Night of the Mask" in D.P. 7 #25 (November 1988) [back-up story]
- Michael Bair - Nightmask #7 (May 1987)
- Keith Giffen - Nightmask #8 (June 1987)
- Mark Bagley - Nightmask #9, 10, 12 (July 1987, August 1987, October 1987)
- Kyle Baker - Nightmask #11 (September 1987)
- Tom Morgan - "The Real Me" in Justice #25 (November 1988) [back-up story]
- Kieron Dwyer - "Madman" in The Star Brand #16 (November 1988) [back-up story]
- Ron Lim - "Teddy Bare!" in The Star Brand #17 (January 1989) [back-up story]

== Collected issues ==
- Nightmask: New Universe (trade paperback), collecting NIGHTMASK #1-12, STAR BRAND #9, JUSTICE (1986) #15, UNTOLD TALES OF THE NEW UNIVERSE: NIGHTMASK; MATERIAL FROM DP7 #25, JUSTICE (1986) #25, STAR BRAND #16-18; first printing: July 2018. ISBN 9781302912574
