= Roy Thomas =

American comic book writer (born 1940)

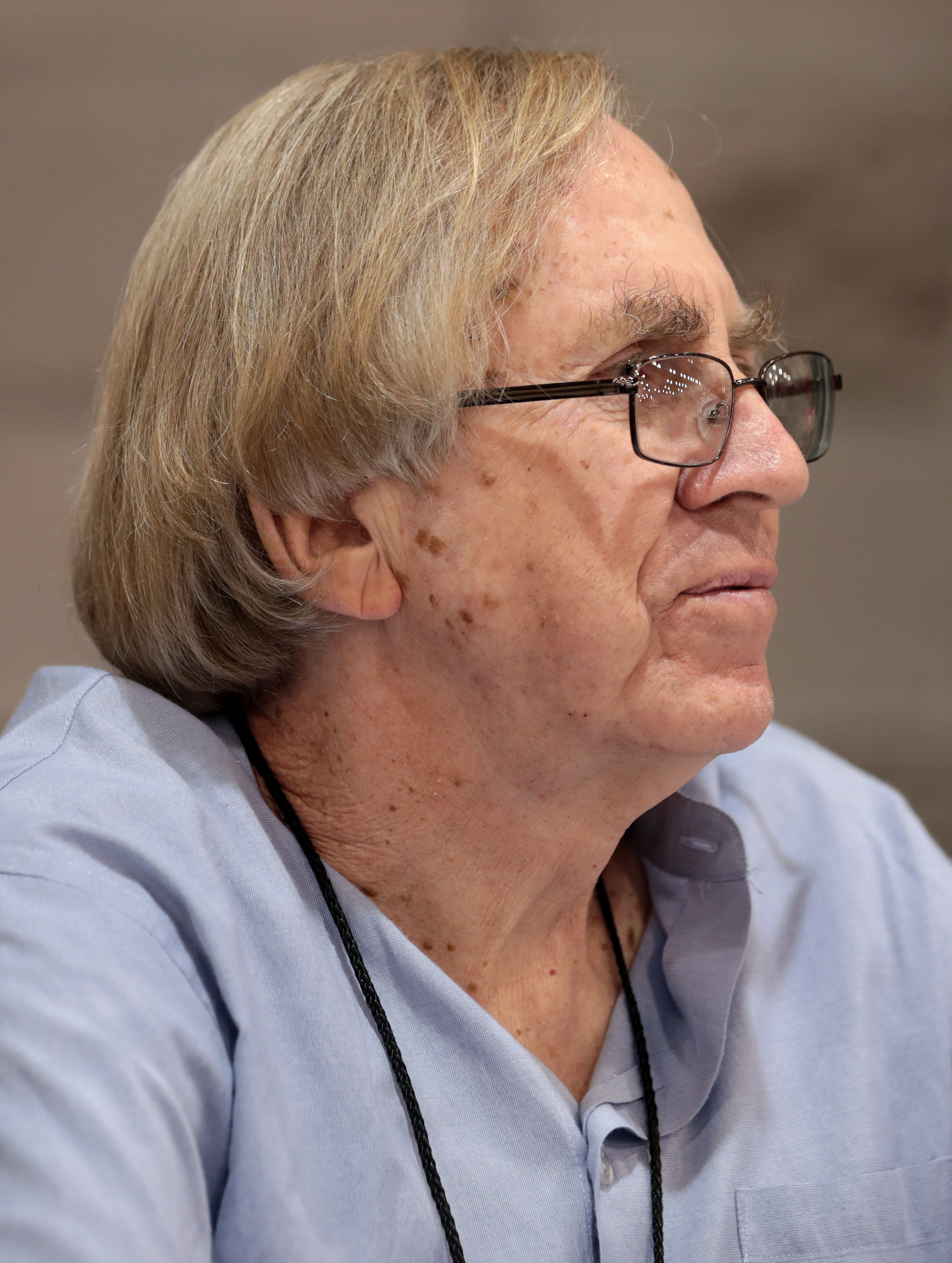
- Thomas in May 2019
- Born: Roy William Thomas Jr. November 22, 1940 (age 86) Jackson, Missouri, U.S.
- Areas: Writer, Editor
- Notable works: The Avengers; Alter Ego; Conan the Barbarian; The Defenders; Invaders; Uncanny X-Men; Thor; Iron Fist; All-Star Squadron; Arak, Son of Thunder; Infinity, Inc. Secret Origins; Young All-Stars
- Awards: Alley Award (1969); Shazam Award (1971 and 1974); Goethe Awards (1971 and 1973 x2 for best writer and editor); Angoulême International Comics Festival (1974 award for best foreign writer); Inkpot Award (1974); Comic Fan Art Award (1974 and 1975 x2 for best writer and editor); Eagle Award (1977); Will Eisner Hall of Fame (2011); Harvey Awards Hall of Fame (2022)

Roy William Thomas Jr. (born November 22, 1940) is an American comic book writer and editor. He was Stan Lee's first successor as editor-in-chief of Marvel Comics and possibly best known for introducing the pulp magazine hero Conan the Barbarian to American comics. Thomas is also known for his championing of Golden Age comic-book heroes—particularly the 1940s superhero team the Justice Society of America—and for lengthy writing stints on Marvel's X-Men and The Avengers, and DC Comics' All-Star Squadron and Infinity Inc., among many other titles.

Among the comics characters he co-created are Vision, Doc Samson, Carol Danvers, Luke Cage, Iron Fist, Ultron, Yellowjacket, Defenders, Man-Thing, Red Sonja, Morbius, Ghost Rider, Squadron Supreme, Invaders, Black Knight (Dane Whitman), Nighthawk, Grandmaster, Banshee, Sunfire, Thundra, Arkon, Killraven, Wendell Vaughn, Red Wolf, Red Guardian, Daimon Hellstrom, and Valkyrie.

Thomas was inducted into the Will Eisner Comic Book Hall of Fame in 2011 and into the Harvey Awards Hall of Fame in 2022.

== Early life ==
Thomas was born in Jackson, Missouri, United States. As a child, he was a devoted comic book fan, and in grade school, he wrote and drew his own comics for distribution to friends and family. The first of these was All-Giant Comics, which he recalls as having featured such characters as Elephant Giant. He was enrolled at a parochial Lutheran school and attended St. Paul Lutheran Church in Jackson. As an adult, Thomas is "not religious" and has been described as a "lapsed Lutheran". He graduated from Southeast Missouri State University in 1961 with a BS in education, having majored in history and social science.

Thomas became an early and active member of Silver Age comic book fandom in the early 1960s. Enthusiasm for the rebirth of superhero comics during that period led Jerry Bails to found the fanzine Alter Ego, and Thomas, then a high school English teacher, took over as editor in 1964. Letters from Thomas appeared regularly in the letters pages of both DC and Marvel Comics, including Green Lantern #1 (August 1960), The Flash #116 (Nov. 1960), Brave and the Bold #35 (May 1961), Fantastic Four #5 (July 1962), Fantastic Four #15 (June 1963), Fantastic Four #22 (Jan. 1964), and Blackhawk #211 (Aug. 1965).

== Career ==
=== Marvel Comics ===
In 1965, Thomas moved to New York City to take a job at DC Comics as assistant to Mort Weisinger, then the editor of the Superman titles. Thomas said he had just accepted a fellowship to study foreign relations at George Washington University when he received a letter from Weisinger, "with whom I had exchanged one or two letters, tops", asking Thomas to become "his assistant editor on a several-week trial basis." Thomas had already written a Jimmy Olsen script "a few months before, while still living and teaching in the St. Louis area," he said in 2005. "I worked at DC for eight days in late June and very early July of 1965" before accepting a job at Marvel Comics. The Marvel "Bullpen Bulletins" in Fantastic Four #61 (April 1967) describes Thomas "admitting that he gave up a scholarship to George Washington University just to write for Marvel!"

This came after his chafing under the notoriously difficult Weisinger, to a point, Thomas said in 1981, that he would go "home to my dingy little room at, coincidentally, the George Washington Hotel in Manhattan, during that second week, and actually feeling tears well into my eyes, at the ripe old age of 24." Familiar with editor and chief writer Stan Lee's Marvel work, and feeling them "the most vital comics around", Thomas "just sat down one night at the hotel and – I wrote him a letter! Not applying for a job or anything so mundane as that – I just said that I admired his work, and would like to buy him a drink some time. I figured he just might remember me from Alter Ego." Lee did, and phoned Thomas to offer him a Marvel writing test.

The writer's test, Thomas said in 1998, "was four Jack Kirby pages from Fantastic Four Annual #2 ... [Stan Lee] had Sol [Brodsky] or someone take out the dialogue. It was just black-and-white. Other people like Denny O'Neil and Gary Friedrich took it. But soon afterwards we stopped using it." The day after taking the test, Thomas was at DC, proofreading a Supergirl story, when Lee's secretary Flo Steinberg called asking Thomas to meet with Lee over lunch, and at that meeting Thomas, agreed to work for Marvel. He returned to DC to give "indefinite notice" to Weisinger, but Weisinger ordered him to leave immediately and "I was back at Marvel less than an hour after I first left, and had a Modeling with Millie assignment to do over the weekend. It was a Friday." His employment was announced in the "Bullpen Bulletins" section of Fantastic Four #47 (Feb. 1966) under the heading "How About That! Department" ("Roy's a fan who's made it!"). Thomas later described his early days at Marvel:

I was hired after taking [the] 'writer's test', and my first official job title at Marvel was 'staff writer'. I wasn't hired as an editor or assistant editor. I was supposed to come in 40 hours a week and write scripts on staff. ... I sat at this corrugated metal desk with a typewriter in a small office with production manager Sol Brodsky and corresponding secretary Flo Steinberg. Everybody who came up to Marvel wound up there, and the phone was constantly ringing, with conversations going on all around me. ... Almost at once, even though Stan proofed all the finished stories, he and Sol started having me check the corrections before they went out, and that would break up my concentration still further. ... [and] they kept asking me to do this or that, or questions like in which issue something happened, or Stan would come in to check something, because I knew a lot about Marvel continuity up to that time. ... It quickly became apparent to them, too, that the staff writer thing wasn't working, and Stan segued me over to being an editorial assistant, which immediately worked out better for all concerned.

To that point, editor-in-chief Lee had been the main writer of Marvel publications, with his brother, Larry Lieber, often picking up the slack scripting some of the stories plotted by Lee. Thomas soon became the first new Marvel writer to sustain a presence at a time when comics veterans such as Robert Bernstein, Ernie Hart, Leon Lazarus, and Don Rico, and fellow newcomers Steve Skeates (hired a couple of weeks earlier) and O'Neil (brought in at Thomas' recommendation a few months later) did not. His Marvel debut was the romance-comics story "Whom Can I Turn To?" in the Millie the Model spin-off Modeling with Millie #44 (Dec. 1965)—for which the credits and the logo were inadvertently left off due to a production glitch, resulting in this being left off most credit lists. Thomas' first Marvel superhero scripting was an "Iron Man" story in Tales of Suspense #73 (Jan. 1966), entitled "My Life for Yours", working from a Lee plot and a plot assist from secretary Steinberg. Thomas estimates that Lee rewrote approximately half of that fledgling attempt.

Thomas' earliest Marvel work also included the teen-romance title Patsy and Hedy #104–105 (Feb.-April 1966), and two "Doctor Strange" stories, plotted by Lee and Steve Ditko, in Strange Tales #143–144 (April–May 1966). Two previously written freelance stories for Charlton Comics also saw print: "The Second Trojan War" in Son of Vulcan #50 (Jan. 1966) and "The Eye of Horus" in Blue Beetle #54 (March 1966). "When Stan saw the couple of Charlton stories I'd written earlier in more of a Gardner Fox style, he wasn't too impressed," Thomas recalled. "It's probably a good thing I already had my job at Marvel at that point! I think I was the right person in the right place at the right time, but there are other people who, had they been there, might have been just as right."

Thomas took on what would be his first long-term Marvel title, the World War II series Sgt. Fury and his Howling Commandos, starting with #29 (April 1966) and continuing through #41 (April 1967) and the series' 1966 annual, Sgt. Fury Special #2. He also began writing the mutant-superteam title [Uncanny] X-Men from #20–43 (May 1966 – April 1968), and, finally, took over The Avengers, starting with #35 (Dec. 1966), and continuing until 1972. That notable run was marked by a strong sense of continuity, and stories that ranged from the personal to the cosmic—the latter most prominently with the "Kree-Skrull War" in issues #89–97 (June 1971 – March 1972). Additional work included an occasional "Nick Fury, Agent of S.H.I.E.L.D." and "Doctor Strange" story in Strange Tales. When that title became the solo comic Doctor Strange, he wrote the entire run of new stories, from #169–183 (June 1968 – Nov. 1969), mostly with the art team of penciler Gene Colan and inker Tom Palmer.

As Thomas self-evaluated in a 1981 interview, shortly after leaving Marvel for rival DC Comics, "One of the reasons Stan liked my writing ... was that after a few issues he felt he could trust me enough that he virtually never again read anything I wrote – well, at least not more than a page or two in a row, just to keep me honest."

Thomas eloped in July 1968 to marry his first wife, Jean Maxey, returning to work a day late from a weekend comic-book convention in St. Louis, Missouri. Thomas said in 2000 that Brodsky, in the interim, had assigned Doctor Strange to writer Archie Goodwin, newly ensconced at Marvel and writing Iron Man, but Thomas convinced Brodsky to return it to him. "I got very possessive about Doctor Strange," Thomas recalled. "It wasn't a huge seller, but [by the time it was canceled], we were selling in the low 40 percent range of more than 400,000 print run, so it was actually selling a couple hundred thousand copies [but] at the time you needed to sell even more." He eventually did have a Caribbean honeymoon, where he scripted the wedding of Hank Pym and Janet van Dyne in The Avengers #60 (Jan. 1969). Thomas, who had turned over X-Men to other writers, returned with issue #55 (April 1969) when the series was on the verge of cancellation. While efforts to save it failed—the title ended its initial run with #66—Thomas' collaboration with artist Neal Adams through #63 (Dec. 1969) is regarded as a Silver Age creative highlight. Thomas won the 1969 Alley Award that year for Best Writer, while Adams and inker Tom Palmer, netted 1969 Alley Awards for Best Pencil Artist and Best Inking Artist, respectively.

Thomas and artist Barry Smith launched Conan the Barbarian in October 1970, based on Robert E. Howard's 1930s pulp-fiction sword-and-sorcery character. Thomas, who stepped down from his editorship in August 1974, wrote hundreds of Conan stories in a host of Marvel comics and the black-and-white magazines Savage Tales and The Savage Sword of Conan. During that time, he and Smith also brought to comics the sword-wielding woman-warrior Red Sonja, initially as a Conan supporting character, based on a character created by Howard for a story set in a different historical era. Comics historian Les Daniels noted that, "Conan the Barbarian was something of a gamble for Marvel. The series contained the usual elements of action and fantasy, to be sure, but it was set in a past that had no relation to the Marvel Universe, and it featured a hero who possessed no magical powers, little humor and comparatively few moral principles."

In 1971, with Stan Lee, Gerry Conway and Gray Morrow, Thomas created Man-Thing and wrote the first Man-Thing story in color comics, after Conway and Len Wein had introduced the character in the black-and-white comics magazine Savage Tales. Later that year, Thomas wrote the "Kree–Skrull War" storyline across multiple issues of The Avengers penciled variously by Sal Buscema, Neal Adams, and John Buscema. Thomas was the first person other than Stan Lee to receive a writer's credit for The Amazing Spider-Man, and he and artist Ross Andru launched the Spider-Man spin-off title Marvel Team-Up in March 1972.

Thomas, with Marvel writers and artists, co-created many other characters, among them Ultron (and the fictional metal adamantium), Carol Danvers, Morbius the Living Vampire, Luke Cage, Iron Fist, Ghost Rider, Doc Samson, Valkyrie, Werewolf by Night, Banshee and Killraven. Thomas also co-created several characters based on pre-existing characters, including the Vision, Yellowjacket, the Black Knight, and Adam Warlock.

==== Editor-in-chief ====
In 1972, when Lee became Marvel's publisher, Thomas succeeded him as editor-in-chief. Thomas also continued to script mainstream titles, including Marvel's flagship, Fantastic Four. He launched such new titles as the "non-team" The Defenders, as well as What If, a title that explored fictional alternate histories of Marvel's existing characters and stories. In addition, he indulged his love of Golden Age comic-book heroes in the World War II-set superhero series The Invaders. He was instrumental in engineering Marvel's comic-book adaptation of the 1977 film Star Wars, without which, 1980s Marvel editor Jim Shooter believed, "[W]e would have gone out of business". In 1975, Thomas wrote the first joint publishing venture between Marvel and DC Comics—a 72-page Wizard of Oz movie adaptation in an oversized "Treasury Edition" format with art by John Buscema. He and Buscema crafted a comics adaptation of Tarzan for Marvel in June 1977.

=== DC Comics ===
In 1981, after several years of freelancing for Marvel and a dispute with then editor-in-chief Jim Shooter, Thomas signed a three-year exclusive writing/editing contract with DC. He marked his return to that company with a two-part Green Lantern story in Green Lantern #138–139 (March–April 1981), and briefly wrote Batman, DC Comics Presents, and the Legion of Super-Heroes. DC gave Thomas' work a promotional push by featuring several of his series in free, 16-page insert previews.

Thomas married his second wife, Danette Couto, in May 1981. Danette legally changed her first name to Dann and would become Thomas' regular writing partner. He credits her with the original idea for the Arak, Son of Thunder series drawn by Ernie Colón. Writer Gerry Conway was also a frequent collaborator with Thomas. Together, they wrote a two-part Superman-Shazam team-up in DC Comics Presents; a series of Atari Force and Swordquest mini-comics packaged with Atari 2600 video games; and three Justice League-Justice Society crossovers. Conway also contributed ideas to the talking animal comic Captain Carrot and His Amazing Zoo Crew!, created by Thomas and Scott Shaw. Thomas and Conway were to be the co-writers of the JLA/Avengers intercompany crossover but editorial disputes between DC and Marvel caused the project's cancellation. During that era, Roy Thomas and Gerry Conway collaborated on the screenplays for two movies: the animated feature Fire and Ice (1983) and Conan the Destroyer (1984). The duo also worked on a live-action X-Men film for production company Nelvana that never went into production.

As a solo writer, Roy Thomas wrote Wonder Woman and, with artist Gene Colan, updated the character's costume and introduced a new supervillainess, the Silver Swan. His final work on the series, issue #300 (Feb. 1983), was co-written with his wife Dann Thomas, who, as Roy Thomas noted in 1999 "became the first woman ever to receive scripting credit on the world's foremost super-heroine." Joye Hummel and Dorothy Woolfolk ghostwrote some early Wonder Woman stories but were not credited.

Thomas realized a childhood dream in writing the Justice Society of America (JSA). Reviving the Golden Age group in Justice League of America #193 and continuing in All-Star Squadron, he wrote retro adventures, like those of The Invaders, set in World War II. In addition to the JSA's high-profile heroes, Thomas revived such characters as Liberty Belle, Johnny Quick, Robotman, Firebrand, the Tarantula, and Neptune Perkins. He used the series to address the complicated and sometimes contradictory continuity issues surrounding the JSA.

In 1983, Thomas and artist Jerry Ordway created Infinity, Inc., a group composed of the JSA's children. The characters debuted in All-Star Squadron #25 (Sept. 1983) and were launched in their own series in March 1984. Thomas wrote several limited series for DC including America vs. the Justice Society, Jonni Thunder a.k.a. Thunderbolt, Shazam!: The New Beginning, and Crimson Avenger as well as two issues of DC Challenge. From 1986 to 1988, Thomas contributed to the Secret Origins series and wrote most of the stories involving the Golden Age characters including Superman and Batman. In 1986, DC decided to write off the JSA from active continuity. A one-shot issue titled The Last Days of the Justice Society involved most of the JSA battling the forces of evil while merged with the Norse gods in an ever-repeating Ragnarok-like Limbo was written by Thomas, with art by David Ross. Young All-Stars replaced All-Star Squadron following the changes to DC's continuity brought about by the Crisis on Infinite Earths limited series. Thomas' last major project for DC was an adaptation of Richard Wagner's Ring cycle drawn by Gil Kane and published in 1989–1990. Since then, Thomas has written a trio of Elseworlds one-shots combining DC characters with classic cinema and literature: Superman's Metropolis (1996), Superman: War of the Worlds (1998), and JLA: The Island of Dr. Moreau (2002).

=== Return to Marvel and other comic work ===
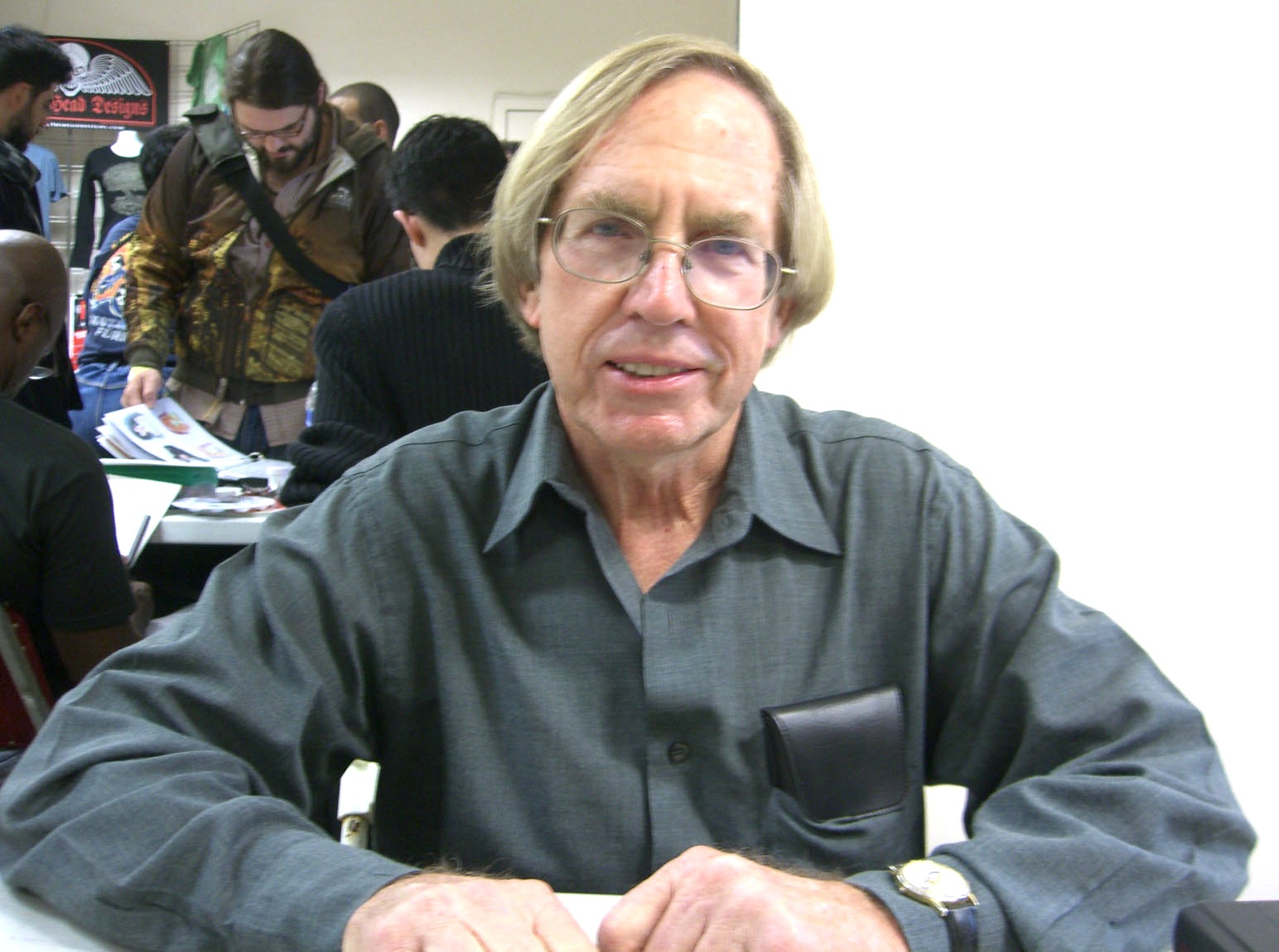
Thomas at the Big Apple Con, November 14, 2008

In 1984, Thomas sent Jim Shooter a letter in which he hoped ...

... to let bygones be bygones, and if possible, to avoid adverse comment on Marvel and its policies. I've even long regretted the fact that your elevation to the position of editor-in-chief, in which you've obviously done a fine job, came at a time after I'd moved to the West Coast. Perhaps if we'd had more personal communication from 1977 to 1980, we could have come to some sort of agreement at that time or at least parted under more amicable circumstances. I leave it to you to decide if we should ever make any attempt to rectify that situation; certainly I've never been a grudge-carrier in other cases. ...

By 1986, Thomas wrote for Marvel's New Universe line, beginning with Spitfire and the Troubleshooters #5 (Feb. 1987), followed by a multi-issue run of Nightmask, co-scripted by his wife Dann Thomas. He scripted titles starring Doctor Strange, Thor, the Avengers West Coast, and Conan, often co-scripting with Dann Thomas or Jean-Marc Lofficier.

Over the next ten years Thomas did less work for the mainstream comics press. For a series of independent publishers, he wrote issues of the TV-series tie-ins Xena: Warrior Princess, Hercules: The Legendary Journeys and The X-Files for Topps Comics. He also wrote for television, and relaunched Alter Ego as a formal magazine published by TwoMorrows Publishing in 1999. In 2005, he earned a master's degree in humanities from California State University.

With Marvel's four-issue miniseries Stoker's Dracula (Oct. 2004 – May 2005), Thomas and artist Dick Giordano completed an adaptation of Bram Stoker's novel Dracula, which the duo had begun 30 years earlier in 10- to 12-page instalments, beginning with Marvel's black-and-white horror-comics magazine Dracula Lives! #5 (March 1974). They had completed 76 pages, comprising roughly one-third of the novel, through issues #6–8 and 10–11 and Marvel Preview #8 ("The Legion of Monsters"), before Marvel canceled Dracula Lives and later many of its other black-and-whites.

Anthem, a comic book series by Thomas and artists Daniel Acuña, Jorge Santamaria Garcia and Benito Gallego, about World War II superheroes in an alternate reality, was published by Heroic Publishing in January 2006. Thomas returned to Red Sonja in 2006, writing the one-shot Red Sonja: Monster Isle for Dynamite Entertainment. In 2007 Thomas wrote a Black Knight story for Marvel's four-issue miniseries Mystic Arcana.

From 2007 to 2010, Thomas wrote adaptations of classic literature for the Marvel imprint Marvel Illustrated, including The Last of the Mohicans (2007), The Man in the Iron Mask (2007–2008), Treasure Island (2007–2008), The Iliad (2008), Moby-Dick (2008), The Picture of Dorian Gray (2008), The Three Musketeers (2008–2009), and Kidnapped (2009). In 2010, Marvel Illustrated released a collection of all the Dracula material adapted by Thomas and Giordano, originally published in the 1970s and mid-2000s.

=== Later career ===
In 2011, Roy Thomas wrote the one-shot DC Retroactive: Wonder Woman – The '80s with art by Rich Buckler. In 2012, Thomas teamed with artists Mike Hawthorne and Dan Panosian on Dark Horse's Conan: The Road of Kings, which lasted 12 issues. In 2014, he wrote 75 Years of Marvel: From the Golden Age to the Silver Screen for Taschen, a 700-page hardcover history of Marvel Comics. The following year, he compiled three volumes of World War II-era comics stories featuring Batman, Superman, and Wonder Woman for Chartwell Books.

Thomas had a cameo appearance as a prison inmate on the third season of Marvel's Daredevil, released in October 2018 on Netflix, and wrote a blog entry about this experience.

On November 10, 2018, Thomas visited Stan Lee at Lee's home in Beverly Hills to discuss Thomas' book The Stan Lee Story. Lee told Thomas' manager, John Cimino, "Take care of my boy Roy" before Lee and Thomas were photographed together. Lee died less than 48 hours later.

On February 23, 2019, Jackson, Missouri, declared Roy Thomas Day. In a ceremony, he was awarded the key to the city.

On March 23, 2019, the final Amazing Spider-Man newspaper comic strip was published. Thomas had been the ghost writer for Stan Lee on the strip since 2000.

Thomas made a return to Marvel Comics in 2019 with the release of the Captain America and The Invaders: Bahamas Triangle one-shot drawn by Jerry Ordway, contributed to the Marvel Comics #1000 celebration issue and did a two-part Savage Sword of Conan story with artist Alan Davis. In 2020, Thomas wrote a 10-page story in the Marvel one-shot King-Size Conan #1.

On February 23, 2021, Thomas criticized Abraham Riesman's controversial Stan Lee biography True Believer: The Rise and Fall of Stan Lee. In a guest column in The Hollywood Reporter, Thomas took issue with Riesman's assessment of conflicting accounts of the work of Lee and Jack Kirby, who is credited with co-creating many classic Marvel characters. Thomas stated, "Something like 95 percent of the time, [the book] is a very good biography. However, the remaining (and crucial) 5 percent of its content, scattered amid all that painstaking research and well-written prose, renders it often untrustworthy...i.e., a very bad biography. Because the author often insists, visibly and intrusively, on putting his verbal thumb on the scales, in a dispute he seems ill-equipped to judge."

In 2022, Thomas returned to write the X-Men in the first two issues of X-Men: Legends which tells new in-continuity stories of early X-Men adventures.

Thomas serves on the Disbursement Committee of the comic-book industry charity The Hero Initiative.

== Awards ==
- 1969: Alley Award for Best Writer
- 1971: Shazam Award for Best Writer (Dramatic Division)
- 1971: Goethe Award for Favorite Pro Writer
- 1973: Shazam Award for Best Individual Story ("Song of Red Sonja", with artist Barry Smith, in Conan the Barbarian #24)
- 1973: Goethe Award for Favorite Pro Writer
- 1973: Goethe Award for Favorite Pro Editor
- 1974: Shazam for Superior Achievement by an Individual
- 1974: Angoulême International Comics Festival Award for Best Foreign Author
- 1974: Inkpot Award
- 1974: Comic Fan Art Award for Favorite Pro Editor
- 1975: Comic Fan Art Award for Favorite Pro Writer
- 1975: Comic Fan Art Award for Favorite Pro Editor
- 1977: Favourite Comicbook Writer at the Eagle Awards
- 1977: Nomination: Favourite Single Comicbook Story at the Eagle Awards for Fantastic Four #176: "Improbable as It May Seem the Impossible Man is Back in Town" with penciler George Pérez
- 1978: Nomination: Favourite Writer at the Eagle Awards
- 1978: Nomination: Favourite Continued Story at the Eagle Awards for Star Wars #1–6 with George Lucas and Howard Chaykin
- 1979: Nomination: Best Comic Book Writer (US) at the Eagle Awards
- 1979: Nomination: Best Continued Story at the Eagle Awards for Thor #272–278 with John Buscema
- 1980: Roll of Honour at the Eagle Awards
- 1985: Named as one of the honorees by DC Comics in the company's 50th anniversary publication Fifty Who Made DC Great.
- 1996: Author That We Loved at the Haxtur Awards
- 2011: Will Eisner Comic Book Hall of Fame
- 2017: Sergio Award from the Comic Art Professional Society (CAPS)
- 2022: Harvey Awards Hall of Fame

== Bibliography ==
=== Charlton Comics ===
- Blue Beetle #54 (1966)
- Charlton Premiere #1 (1967)
- Romantic Story #87 (1967)
- Son of Vulcan #50 (1966)

=== Cross Plains Comics ===
- H.P. Lovecraft's The Return of Cthulhu oneshot (2000)
- Red Sonja: A Death in Scarlet oneshot (1999)
- Robert E. Howard's Myth Maker oneshot (1999)
- Robert E. Howard's Wolfshead oneshot (1999)

=== Dark Horse Comics ===
- Conan: Road of the Kings #1–12 (2010–2012)
- Cormac Mac Art #1–4 (1990)
- Creepy Archives #2 (text article) (2023)
- Edgar Rice Burroughs’ Tarzan of the Apes Vol. 1 HC (2022)
- Kings of the Night #1–2 (1989)
- Michael Chabon Presents the Amazing Adventures of the Escapist #3, 5 (2004–2005)
- Robert E. Howard's Ironhand of Almuric #1–4 (1991)

=== DC Comics ===
- Action Comics Weekly #623–626 (1988)
- All Star Comics 80-Page Giant #1 (1999)
- All-Star Squadron #1–67, Annual #1–3 (1981–1987)
- America vs. the Justice Society #1–4 (1985)
- Arak, Son of Thunder #1–50, Annual #1 (1981–1985)
- Atari Force #1–5 (promo) (1982–1983)
- Batman #336–338, 340 (1981)
- Captain Carrot and His Amazing Zoo Crew! #1–11, 16, 18 (1982–1983)
- Crimson Avenger #1–4 (1988)
- DC Challenge #9, 12 (1986)
- DC Comics Presents #31–34, 37, 41, 48–49, Annual #3 (1981–1984)
- DC Retroactive: Wonder Woman – The '80s #1 (2011)
- DC Special Series #26 (1981)
- The Dragonlance Saga GN vol. 1–5 (1987–1991)
- Green Lantern #138–139 (1981)
- Heroes Against Hunger #1 (1986)
- History of the DC Universe HC (text article) (1988)
- Infinity, Inc. #1–53, Annual #1–2, Special #1 (1984–1988)
- JLA: The Island of Dr. Moreau #1 (2002)
- Jonni Thunder a.k.a. Thunderbolt #1–4 (1985)
- Justice League of America #193 (All-Star Squadron insert preview), 207–209, 219–220 (1981–1983)
- Last Days of the Justice Society Special #1 (1986)
- Legion of Super-Heroes vol. 2, #277–283 (1981–1982)
- The New Teen Titans #16 (Captain Carrot insert preview) (1982)
- The New Teen Titans vol. 2, #38 (1987)
- The Ring of the Nibelung #1–4 (1989–1990)
- Secret Origins vol. 2, #1, 3, 5–9, 11–13, 15–22, 24–26, 28–31, 42, Annual #1 (1986–1989)
- Shazam!: The New Beginning #1–4 (1987)
- The Superman Family #207 (1981)
- Superman's Metropolis #1 (1996)
- Superman's Pal Jimmy Olsen #91 (1966)
- Superman: War of the Worlds #1 (1998)
- Swordquest #1–3 (1982)
- The Warlord #48 (Arak, Son of Thunder insert preview) (1981)
- Wonder Woman #288–296, 300 (1982–1983)
- World's Finest Comics #271 (1981)
- Young All-Stars #1–31, Annual #1 (1987–1989)

=== Don Lawrence Collection ===
- Storm: De Kronieken van Roodhaar #1 (2014)

=== Dynamite Entertainment ===
- Red Sonja #100, #1973, Giant Size #1 (2007, 2013)
- Red Sonja: Ballad of the Red Goddess OGN (2019)
- Red Sonja Holiday Special oneshot (2018)
- Red Sonja: Monster Isle oneshot (2006)

=== First Comics ===
- Alter Ego #1–4 (not to be confused with the magazine of the same name) (1986)
- Elric: Sailor on the Seas of Fate #1–7 (1985–1986)
- Elric: The Bane of the Black Sword #1–6 (1988–1989)
- Elric: The Vanishing Tower #1–6 (1989–1988)
- Elric: The Weird of the White Wolf #1–5 (1986–1987)

=== Heroic Publishing ===
- Captain Thunder and Blue Bolt #1–10 (1987–1988)
- Heroic Spotlight #10–12, 15–16 (2013–2014)
- Liberty Comics #6 (2012)
- Roy Thomas' Anthem #1–5 (2006–2009)

=== Millenium Publications ===
- H. P. Lovecraft's Cthulhu: The Festival #1–3 (1993–1994)

=== Marvel Comics ===
- Amazing Adventures vol. 2, #5–6, 8, 18 (1971–1973)
- The Amazing Spider-Man #101–104 (1971–1972)
- Astonishing Tales #1–2, 7–8, 10–13 (1970–1972)
- The Avengers #35–104, 132; Annual #1–2, 19–20, 22–23; Giant-Size #1, 3, King-Size Special #1 (1966–1975, 1991–1994)
- Avengers Spotlight #37–39 (1990)
- Avengers West Coast #60–63, 65–101, Annual #5–8 (1990–1993)
- Avengers: The Ultron Imperative #1 (2001)
- Black Knight #1–4 (1990)
- Captain America #215, 217, 423, Annual #9, 11, 13 (1977–1994)
- Captain America: Medusa Effect #1 (1994)
- Captain America and The Invaders: Bahamas Triangle #1 (2019)
- Captain Marvel #1–4, 17–21 (1968–1970)
- The Cat #1 (1972)
- Chamber of Chills #3 (1973)
- Chamber of Darkness #2–5, 7 (1969–1970)
- Conan the Adventurer #1–14 (1994–1995)
- Conan the Barbarian #1–115, 240–275; Annual #2, 4–7; Giant-Size #1–4 (1970–1982, 1991–1993)
- Conan the Savage #1–6, 10 (1995–1996)
- Conan: Death Covered in Gold #1–3 (1999)
- Conan: Flame and the Fiend #1–3 (2000)
- Conan: Scarlet Sword #1–3 (1998–1999)
- Conan: The Lord of the Spiders #1–3 (1998)
- Conan: The Ravagers Out of Time GN (1992)
- Creatures on the Loose #10, 16–17 (1971–1972)
- Daredevil #50–69, 71 (1969–1970)
- Doc Savage #1 (1972)
- Doctor Strange #169–178, 180–183 (1968–1969)
- Doctor Strange, Sorcerer Supreme #5–24, 26–47, 52–56, Annual #2 (1989–1993)
- Dracula Lives #1–3, 5–8, 10–11 (1973–1975)
- Epic Illustrated #2–5, 14, 34 (1980–1986)
- Eternals: The Herod Factor #1 (1991)
- Fantastic Four #119, 126–133, 136, 157–179, 181, 303, Annual #11, 22 (1972–1977, 1987–1989)
- Fantastic Four Unlimited #1–7, 9–12 (1993–1995)
- Giant-Size Super-Villain Team-Up #1–2 (1975)
- Haunt of Horror #1 (1974)
- Hulk: Broken Worlds #1 (2009)
- Impossible Man Summer Vacation Spectacular #1 (1990)
- The Incredible Hulk vol. 2, #105–106, 121–145, 147, 158, 172–178 (1968–1974)
- Invaders #1–9, 11–23, 25–28, 32–36; Annual #1; Giant-Size #1 (1975–1979); Giant Size #2 (2005)
- Invaders vol. 2, #1–4 (1993)
- Iron Man #44, 47; Annual #11–12 (1972, 1990–1991)
- Iron Man and Sub-Mariner #1 (1968)
- Journey into Mystery vol. 2, #1 (1972)
- Kid Colt Outlaw #127, 136 (1966–1967)
- King Conan #1–8 (1980–1981)
- King-Size Conan #1 (2020)
- Kull the Conqueror/Kull the Destroyer #1–3, 11, 16 (1972–1976)
- Legion of Monsters #1 (Dracula story) (1975)
- Marvel Comics #1000 (2019)
- Marvel Comics Presents #44 (1990)
- Marvel Comics Super Special #2 (1978)
- Marvel Double Feature:Thunderstrike/Code: Blue (Code: Blue segment) #13–16 (1994–1995)
- Marvel Feature #1–4 (1971–1972)
- Marvel Feature vol. 2 (Red Sonja) #1, 6–7 (1975–1976)
- Marvel Graphic Novel #2 (Elric) (1982)
- Marvel Graphic Novel: Conan of the Isles (1989)
- Marvel Graphic Novel: Conan the Rogue (1991)
- Marvel Graphic Novel: Conan: The Horn of Azoth (1990)
- Marvel Illustrated: The Iliad #1–8 (2008)
- Marvel Illustrated: Kidnapped #1–5 (2009)
- Marvel Illustrated: The Last of the Mohicans #1–6 (2007)
- Marvel Illustrated: The Man in the Iron Mask #1–6 (2007–2008)
- Marvel Illustrated: Moby-Dick #1–6 (2008)
- Marvel Illustrated: The Picture of Dorian Gray #1–6 (2008)
- Marvel Illustrated: The Three Musketeers #1–6 (2008–2009)
- Marvel Illustrated: Treasure Island #1–6 (2007–2008)
- Marvel Illustrated: The Trojan War #1–5 (2009)
- Marvel Premiere #1–2, 15, 29–30, 33–37 (1972–1977)
- Marvel Preview #1, 9, 19 (1975–1979)
- Marvel Spotlight #2 (1972)
- Marvel Super Special #9 (1979)
- Marvel Super-Heroes #13, 17, 20 (1968–1969)
- Marvel Super-Heroes vol. 2, #6–7, 12, 14 (1991–1993)
- Marvel Team-Up #1 (1972)
- Marvel Treasury of Oz Featuring the Marvelous Land of Oz #1 (1976)
- Marvel Treasury Edition #23 (Conan) (1979)
- Marvel Two-in-One #20; Annual #1 (1976)
- Millie the Model #135–136 (1966)
- Modeling with Millie #44–46 (1965–1966)
- Monsters on the Prowl #16 (1972)
- Monsters Unleashed #1, 3 (1973)
- Mystic Arcana: Black Knight #1 (2007)
- Namor, the Sub-Mariner #42–43; Annual #1 (1991–1993)
- Nick Fury, Agent of S.H.I.E.L.D. #4, 6 (1968)
- Nightmask #6–7, 10–12 (1987)
- Not Brand Echh #1–5, 7–9, 11–13 (1967–1969)
- Patsy and Hedy #104–105 (1966)
- Pizzazz (Star Wars comic) #1–8 (1977–1978)
- Rawhide Kid #67, 91 (1968–1971)
- Red Sonja #1–15 (1977–1979)
- Red Sonja vol. 2, #1–2 (1983)
- Red Wolf #1 (1972)
- Saga of the Original Human Torch #1–4 (1990)
- Saga of the Sub-Mariner #1–12 (1988–1989)
- Savage Sword of Conan #1–79, 190–235 (1974–1984, 1991–1995)
- Savage Sword of Conan vol. 2, #10–11 (2019)
- Savage Tales #1–5 (1971–1974)
- Secret Defenders #1–8 (1993)
- Sgt. Fury and his Howling Commandos #29–41; Annual #2 (1966–1967)
- Spider-Man/Dr. Strange: The Way to Dusty Death #1 (1993)
- Spider-Woman #1–4 (1993–1994)
- Spoof #1–2 (1970–1972)
- Spitfire and the Troubleshooters #5 (1987)
- Stan Lee Meets the Thing #1 (2006)
- Starbrand #7 (1987)
- Star Wars #1–10 (1977–1978)
- Stoker's Dracula #1–4 (2004–2005)
- Strange Tales #143–144, 150, 153–154, 158–159 (1966–1967)
- Sub-Mariner #1–40 (1968–1971)
- Submariner Comics 70th Anniversary Special #1 (2009)
- Supernatural Thrillers #1, 3 (1972–1973)
- Tales of Suspense #87 (1967)
- Tales of the Zombie #1 (1973)
- Tales to Astonish #93–95, 97–98 (1967)
- Tarzan #1–14; Annual #1 (1977–1978)
- Thor #239–240, 272–278, 280, 283–299, 472–489; Annual #7–8, 14–15, 17, 19 (1975–1980, 1989–1995)
- Timely Comics Presents The Human Torch oneshot (afterword) (1999)
- Tower of Shadows #2–3, 5, 9 (1969–1971)
- Two-Gun Kid #88 (1967)
- Unknown Worlds of Science Fiction #3, 5–6 (1975)
- Vampire Tales #1–2, 5 (1973–1974)
- Warlock #1–2, 6 (1972–1973)
- Western Gunfighters vol. 2, #1 (1970)
- What If ...? #1–2, 4, 6, 13 (1977–1979)
- What If ...? vol. 2, #1, 9, 15, 19, 24, 35–39 (1989–1992)
- What If ...? vol. 9, #200 (text article) (2011)
- Within Our Reach #1 (1992)
- Worlds Unknown #2–3, 5 (1973–1974)
- X-Men #20–43, 55–64, 66 (1966–1970)
- X-Men: Black Sun #3 (2000)
- X-Men: Gold #1 (2014)
- X-Men Legends #1–2 (2022)

=== Marvel Comics/DC Comics ===
- MGM's Marvelous Wizard of Oz #1 (1975)

=== Topps Comics ===
- Bram Stoker's Dracula: Official Comics Adaptation of the Francis Ford Coppola Film #1—4 (1992–1993)
- Bombast #1 (1993)
- Captain Glory #1 (1993)
- Cadillacs and Dinosaurs #1–9 (1994)
- The Frankenstein / Dracula War #1–3 (1995)
- Hercules: The Legendary Journeys #1–5 (1996)
- Jack Kirby's Secret City Saga #0–4 (1993)
- Mary Shelley's Frankenstein #1–4 (1994–1995)
- Xena: Warrior Princess #1–2 (1997)
- Xena: Warrior Princess – The Dragon's Teeth #1–3 (1997–1998)
- Xena: Warrior Princess Vs Callisto #1–3 (1998)
- Xena: Warrior Princess: Year One #1 (1997)
- The X-Files: Season One Episodes "Pilot", "Squeeze", "Deep Throat", "Conduit", "Ice", "Space", "Fire", "Beyond the Sea", Shadows" (1997–1998)

=== TSR, Inc. ===
- Warhawks #1–3 (1990)

== Screenwriting credits ==
=== Television ===
- The New Fantastic Four (1978)
- The Plastic Man Comedy/Adventure Show (1979–1980)
- Thundarr the Barbarian (1980–1981)
- G.I. Joe: A Real American Hero (1985)
- Conan the Adventurer (1992–1993)
- Xena: Warrior Princess (1996)
- G.I. Joe Extreme (1997)

=== Films ===
- Fire and Ice (1983)
- Conan the Destroyer (1984)

Preceded by Stan Lee	Marvel Comics Editor-in-Chief; 1972–1974	Succeeded by Len Wein
Preceded by Stan Lee	(Uncanny) X-Men writer 1966–1968	Succeeded by Gary Friedrich
Preceded by Stan Lee	The Avengers writer 1966–1972	Succeeded by Steve Englehart
Preceded by Arnold Drake	(Uncanny) X-Men writer 1969–1970	Succeeded by Chris Claremont
Preceded by Stan Lee	Daredevil writer 1969–1970	Succeeded by Gerry Conway
Preceded by Stan Lee	The Incredible Hulk writer 1970–1972	Succeeded by Archie Goodwin
Preceded by n/a	Conan the Barbarian writer 1970–1980	Succeeded by J. M. DeMatteis
Preceded by Stan Lee	The Amazing Spider-Man writer 1971–1972	Succeeded by Stan Lee
Preceded by Len Wein	Man-Thing writer 1972	Succeeded by Gerry Conway
Preceded by Stan Lee	Fantastic Four writer 1972–1973	Succeeded by Gerry Conway
Preceded by Steve Englehart	The Incredible Hulk writer (with Gerry Conway); 1974	Succeeded by Len Wein
Preceded by Gerry Conway	Fantastic Four writer 1975–1977	Succeeded by Len Wein
Preceded by Jack Kirby	Captain America writer 1977	Succeeded by Donald F. Glut
Preceded by n/a	What If ... ? writer 1977	Succeeded by Donald F. Glut
Preceded by Len Wein	Thor writer 1978–1980	Succeeded by Mark Gruenwald and Ralph Macchio
Preceded by Ron Marz	Thor writer 1994–1995	Succeeded by Warren Ellis
