= Tom Grindberg =

American comic illustrator

- Born: November 3, 1961 (age 65)
- Area: Penciller
- Notable works: Batman: Bride of The Demon; Silver Surfer vol. 3

Tom Grindberg (born November 3, 1961) is an American comic book illustrator. Noted for his work for Marvel and DC comics, his portfolio also includes 2000 A.D. Presents #16–19 and Judge Dredd #10–11 for Fleetway in 1987.

== Early life ==
Grindberg attended Bethesda-Chevy Chase High School in Bethesda, Maryland.

His start in comics came, he said, when “I went to both Marvel and DC comics back in 1981 when I was still 19 years old and began my career in comics. I went to Marvel and met Jim Shooter who was the EIC at the time and he basically asked which rock did I crawl from under and gave me my first assignment. It was an inventory job to test me out on. That same day I went to DC’s offices and met Ernie Colon, their art director at the time. He offered about the same thing but did mention something about illustrating Batman, which really was not as hot as the Marvel characters at the time and since I already had a commitment from Marvel I stayed put with my first offer.”

== Career ==
Among his earliest DC Comics work was illustrating "Round 8", an eight-page story in New Talent Showcase #7 (July 1984), a comics anthology series intended to provide work for up-and-coming artists who did not have a regular assignment. In 1990, Grindberg collaborated with writer Mike W. Barr on the Batman: Bride of the Demon graphic novel. Grindberg's other DC work includes Action Comics, Adventures of Superman, Aquaman, Azrael, Detective Comics, Batman, Captain Atom, Firestorm the Nuclear Man, Green Lantern, Hawk and Dove, Checkmate, and Ion.

His Marvel Comics work includes Marvel Comics Presents, Silver Surfer, Daredevil, and work on several Conan the Barbarian books, including Conan, Conan Saga, Conan the Savage, and Savage Sword of Conan.

Grindberg drew the 1996 Doom comic book, and also worked on Solar, Man of the Atom for Valiant Comics in 1995 with writer Dan Jurgens.

== Bibliography ==
=== Comic books ===
==== Continuity Comics ====
- Armor #1–4 (1985–1988)

==== Dark Horse Comics ====
- Tarzan: The New Adventures HC reprints strip numbers #3693–3753 with storylines drawn by Grindberg (2022)

==== DC Comics ====
- Action Comics #613–614 (Phantom Stranger); #749, 757 (Superman) (1988, 1998)
- The Adventures of Superman #563, 570 (1998–1999)
- Aquaman vol. 5 #1,000,000 (1998)
- Azrael #20 (1996)
- Batman #484–485 (1992)
- Batman: Bride of The Demon graphic novel (1990)
- Batman: Catwoman Defiant #1 (1992)
- Captain Atom #34 (1989)
- Checkmate #27–29 (1990)
- Deathstroke #58 (1996)
- Detective Comics Annual #4 (1991)
- Elvira's House of Mystery #1, 5–6, 11 (1986–1987)
- Firebrand #6 (1996)
- Firestorm vol. 2 #80–85 (1988–1989)
- Flash & Green Lantern: The Brave and The Bold #4 (2000)
- Green Lantern vol. 3 #82, 87, 93, 80-Page Giant #1, Annual #4 (1997–1998)
- Guy Gardner: Warrior (with Marc Campos) (1996)
- Hawk and Dove vol. 3 #25–26 (1991)
- Ion #5–6 (2006)
- New Talent Showcase #7, 11–12, 17 (1984–1985)
- The New Titans Annual #6–7 (1990–1991)
- The Outsiders vol. 3 #37 (2006)
- Secret Origins vol. 2 #9 (Star-Spangled Kid); #12 (Golden Age Fury) (1986–1987)
- Sovereign Seven #35 (1998)
- Superboy Annual #4 (1997)
- Supergirl/Prysm: Double-Shot (1998)
- Superman vol. 2 #140, 147, Annual #8 (1996–1999)
- Superman: The Man of Steel #84, 92 (1998–1999)
- Teen Titans Annual #1 (with other artists) (2006)

==== Marvel Comics ====
- The Avengers #379 (1994)
- Cosmic Powers #5 (1994)
- Daredevil #333–337 (1994–1995)
- Iron Man and X-O Manowar in Heavy Metal #1 (1996)
- Justice #12–13 (1987)
- Marvel Comics Presents #1–8 (Shang-Chi) (1988)
- Marvel Holiday Special #2–3 (1992–1993)
- Marvel Team-Up vol. 2 #5 (Spider-Man) (1998)
- The Punisher: The Ghosts of Innocents #1–2 (1993)
- Savage Sword of Conan #149 (1988)
- Secret Defenders #9–14 (1993–1994)
- Silver Sable and the Wild Pack #11–12 (1993)
- Silver Surfer vol. 3 #84, 93–94, 100–102, 104–109, 111–116, Annual #7 (1993–1996)
- Spider-Man 2099 #14, 25, Annual #1 (1993–1994)
- Spider-Man Team-Up #2 (1996)
- Star Trek: Deep Space Nine #1 (1996)
- Thor Annual #18 (1993)
- Venom: Along Came A Spider #2 (1996)
- Warlock and the Infinity Watch #16–17, 19, 21, 23, 24, 26–27 (1993–1994)
- What If? vol. 2 #73 ("What If the Kingpin adopted Daredevil?") (1995)
- X-Factor Annual #2 (1987)

==== Valiant Comics ====
- Solar, Man of the Atom #51–54 (1995)

=== Comic strips ===
- Tarzan (Edgar Rice Burroughs, Inc., 2012–2016)

=== Role-playing games ===
- Conan: Adventures in an Age Undreamed Of (Modiphius Entertainment, inner pages illustrations by Tom Grindberg, among others) (2016)
