= Psi-Man =

Psi-Man is a series of six novels written by Peter David (originally writing under the pseudonym "David Peters"). The books were published starting in 1990 by Diamond Books, and the series was re-released by Ace Books in 2000 (under David's real name).

The series concerns Chuck Simon, a teacher who develops psionic powers including telepathy and telekinesis, but his abilities are discovered by a government agency who wish to turn Chuck into a covert weapon. He goes on the run across a dystopian future landscape of ruined ecologies and elaborate entertainment facilities, often encountering others with strange abilities and mutations. He is joined by a telepathic dog (Rommel), that he meets while honing his telekinetic skills at one of the facilities owned by the government agency called Complex.

Cover art consultants: Hal Steiner, Certified Master Trainer, (Canine consultant) Robin M. Rosenthal, M.A. (Self-defense consultant)

== Titles ==
- Psi-Man 1: Mind-Force Warrior (1990)
- Psi-Man 2: Deathscape (1991)
- Psi-Man 3: Main Street D.O.A. (1991)
- Psi-Man 4: The Chaos Kid (1991)
- Psi-Man 5: Stalker (1991)
- Psi-Man 6: Haven (1992)
