= New Universe =

Marvel Comics imprint

- Parent company: Marvel Comics
- Founded: 1986
- Founder: Jim Shooter, Archie Goodwin, Eliot R. Brown, John Morelli, Mark Gruenwald, Tom DeFalco, Michael Higgins
- Defunct: 1989
- Country of origin: U.S.
- Headquarters location: New York City
- Publication types: Comic books
- Fiction genres: Superhero
- Owners: Marvel Entertainment, LLC (now owned by The Walt Disney Company)

The New Universe is an imprint from Marvel Comics that was published in its original incarnation from 1986 to 1989. It was the first line produced by Marvel Comics utilizing a pre-conceived shared universe concept. It was created by Jim Shooter, Archie Goodwin, Eliot R. Brown, John Morelli, Mark Gruenwald, Tom DeFalco, and edited by Michael Higgins.

In 1986, in honor of Marvel Comics' 25th anniversary, Editor-in-Chief Jim Shooter launched the New Universe line of comics. This was to be a distinctly separate world, fully divorced from the mainstream continuity of the Marvel Universe, consisting of its own continuing characters and stories in a more realistic setting. There would be no hidden races, gods, mythological beings, magic, or supertechnology. Superhuman characters and powers would be limited and thus more subdued in their activities, and their actions would have more realistic consequences. This was in contrast to the traditional Marvel Universe, which always purported to take place in a mirror of the real world, yet public knowledge of superheroes, supervillains and their activities had little effect on normal day-to-day business.

Adding to the sense of realism, the New Universe titles were designed to operate in real-time: a month would lapse in the universe for each month that passed in reality. The limitation of fantasy elements, and the low-key nature of the characters' activities in the New Universe, gave the imprint verisimilitude, to seem like "the world outside your window", which was the imprint's catchphrase.

== Original titles ==
The New Universe initially launched with eight monthly titles:

- DP 7 (created by Mark Gruenwald and Paul Ryan) (32 issues, one annual)

DP 7 focuses on a group of seven paranormals on the run from a sinister medical facility created to deal with the booming paranormal population.

- Justice (created by Archie Goodwin) (32 issues)

The titular hero is an alien knight exiled to Earth by his enemies. With no way to return to his home dimension, he metes out justice to evildoers everywhere.

- Kickers, Inc. (created by Tom DeFalco and Ron Frenz) (12 issues)

Kickers Inc. is a group of heroes-for-hire, all former pro-football players, led by Jack Magniconte, who gains super-human strength, speed, and invulnerability after the White Event at the cost of his brother's life.

- Mark Hazzard: Merc (created by Archie Goodwin) (12 issues, one annual)

Mark Hazzard is a Vietnam veteran turned soldier of fortune whose mercenary lifestyle has cost him the love of his family.

- Nightmask (created by Archie Goodwin) (12 issues)

Orphaned Keith Remsen is a counselor, aided by his sister Teddy, who uses his newfound ability to enter people's dreams to help them recover from trauma and mental illness.

- Psi-Force (created by Archie Goodwin and Walt Simonson) (32 issues, one annual)

Psi-Force is a group of paranormals on the run from a government that seeks to control them. They can meld their abilities into a powerful psionic being called The Psi-Hawk.

- Spitfire and the Troubleshooters (created by Eliot R. Brown and John Morelli) (13 issues; renamed Spitfire from issue #8; renamed Codename: Spitfire from issue #10)

Aided by five prankster students, Professor Jenny Swensen steals her father's M.A.X. armor (a construction suit built for use in a variety of capacities) when she suspects his murderer intends to use it as a weapon of war.

- Star Brand (created by Jim Shooter) (19 issues, one annual; renamed The Star Brand from issue #11)

Ken Connell is given a power called the Star Brand by a mysterious visitor from space, who tells him to guard it well. Driven by his conscience, Connell struggles to find the most just and appropriate use for the Brand's unlimited power.

== Publication history ==
=== Concept and creation ===
To discuss how to capitalize on Marvel Comics's upcoming 25th anniversary, president Jim Galton held a meeting with Marvel's vice presidents, including Jim Shooter, who was also Marvel editor-in-chief. Shooter proposed an idea similar to the later Ultimate Marvel line: end the Marvel Universe, and relaunch all the titles in a remade universe which would use the same characters and story concepts as the original Marvel Universe, but updated to the present era. This idea was rejected because it was seen as meddling with a line that was very successful at the time, and so Shooter instead proposed creating a new universe entirely, one that would supplement the Marvel Universe rather than replace it. This new proposal was approved and given a $120,000 budget.

After a false start in which Tom DeFalco was placed in charge of the project and reportedly made little progress, Shooter conceived a line of comics that would be the next innovation for greater realism in superhero comics. The concept was fleshed out, and ideas for the individual series proposed, at a meeting with Shooter, DeFalco, Archie Goodwin, Eliot R. Brown, John Morelli, and Mark Gruenwald.

The premise behind the line of comics was that, prior to July 22, 1986, the New Universe was identical to the real world. The New Universe's first divergence from normal reality was the White Event, a strange astronomical phenomenon that occurred on that date, at 4:22 a.m., EDT, and lasted for mere moments. It bathed the Earth in a bright white light and caused genetic anomalies in two out of every one million humans, which led to their developing superhuman powers. Many looked completely normal, but for others the anomaly resulted in a physical manifestation that led to horrible disfiguration. Human beings who developed a reaction to the White Event were referred to as paranormals. According to Goodwin, it was intended from the beginning that all the major characters in the New Universe would be either paranormals or in some other way linked to the White Event. However, three of the eight launch titles, including two created by Goodwin himself, had no connection of any sort to the White Event: Mark Hazzard: Merc, Spitfire and the Troubleshooters, and Justice.

=== First year ===
The New Universe was heavily marketed but faced substantial problems. Jim Shooter had planned to recruit top creators, but this became unfeasible when Marvel's parent company, Cadence Industries, threatened to sell off the company, creating immense pressure for Marvel to cut costs and increase revenues. As a result, the New Universe's budget was cut to nothing, and the titles in the line were staffed almost entirely by editors and creators who were new to the industry or otherwise could not get work elsewhere. Because of false starts, and delays in developing the New Universe concept, production of the first issues faced harsh deadline pressures as the 25th anniversary approached. Following the launch, certain books lacked focus as creative teams were swapped. Shooter was also involved with complex politics at Marvel Comics (which eventually led to his termination), and thus could not give the line as much attention as he would have liked. In addition, many readers felt that the line did not follow the advertised "world outside your window" concept; especially strong contradictions to the line's supposed realism were Justice (about an alien knight from a quasi-medieval civilization), Kickers Inc. (a team of five professional football players who work as heroes-for-hire as a sideline), and Codename: Spitfire (whose later issues involved technology that verged on the fantastical). In 2007, comics journalist Philippe Cordier went so far as to declare Jim Shooter's run on Star Brand to be "the New Universe's only good title".

By the end of the imprint's first year, four of the titles (Kickers, Inc., Mark Hazzard: Merc, Nightmask and Codename: Spitfire) were cancelled, while a fifth (Star Brand) had been downgraded to bimonthly status, and Shooter himself had departed Marvel. Though the news bulletins published in the comics reassured readers that the cancellations were only a case of some series not selling as well as others, in fact, even the four remaining New Universe titles were on the brink of cancellation.

=== The "New New Universe" ===
In an effort to save the line, DeFalco (now Marvel's editor-in-chief), Gruenwald, John Byrne, and editor Howard Mackie ended up removing some of the more fantastic elements from it and, in a few cases, doing radical revamps. Byrne signed up to write and do breakdowns on Star Brand, altering the series so that it focused less on Ken Connell and more on the power of the titular object itself. This began initially with the idea of having Ken Connell go public with his identity as Star Brand. Similarly, the premise of Justice was revealed to be a hallucination that had been artificially induced in the title's protagonist by another paranormal. From this point on, Justice becomes a serial killer who targets paranormals who abuse their powers. Some of the characters whose titles had been cancelled returned as backup features or even as supporting characters in the remaining books.

One of the founding ideas of the New Universe was that the existence of paranormals would have real and lasting consequences, but so far these had been few and on the personal level. Gruenwald elaborated:

There was a big misunderstanding among all of the creators, myself included, that we should keep the New U the world outside your window -- that it should never change too much, or else we'd lose reader identification or something. We missed the point of having a virgin universe, uncluttered by known super-beings, aliens, other dimensions, hidden civilizations, and all that. The point is enabling the reader to experience the first time the weird stuff starts happening -- and, more importantly, letting the weird stuff actually affect the status quo of the world.

This changed in issue #12 of Star Brand, in which Ken Connell transfers a portion of the Star Brand to an inanimate object. This same issue reveals that a similar transfer of the Star Brand's power into an asteroid was the trigger for the White Event in the first place. Connell's effort results in a tremendous release of energy, which scoops out a massive crater, obliterating the city of Pittsburgh, Pennsylvania, and most of the surrounding area in what became known as the Black Event. The crater that existed where Pittsburgh had once been became known as "The Pitt", and its creation marked a turn into a generally grimmer tone for the line, with a more militarized international political scene, and some themes of post-apocalyptic fiction being explored. The increasingly unstable political scene would have effects such as the forcible military recruitment of paranormals for a war with the Soviet Union (believed by the Americans to have caused the disaster), as portrayed in the graphic novel The Draft.

Despite all of this, the imprint was discontinued in late 1989 after a total of 170 comics had been published. Readers often assumed that the New Universe had suffered from poor sales, but in fact, all four series were solidly profitable right up until their cancellation; the actual reason for discontinuing the line was that, with Marvel Comics in one of its most successful eras, it was felt that staff and production resources would be better used on new, more promising series. The lineup's discontinuation was immediately followed by a four-issue limited series, The War, which was intended as the conclusion of the New Universe.

=== 1993–2005 ===
Writer Peter David introduced an amnesiac character known as the Net Prophet into Spider-Man 2099. He eventually revealed that Net Prophet was actually the New Universe character Justice, who slowly regained his memories during the course of the storyline.

- Spider-Man 2099 #12–14 (1993)
- Spider-Man 2099 #25 (1994)
- Spider-Man 2099 #41, 42, 44 (1996)
- Spider-Man 2099 Annual #1 (1994)

Following the dissolution of the New Universe imprint, Mark Gruenwald, the writer of the New Universe title DP7, decided to bring the Star Brand and other New Universe characters into the Marvel Universe proper some years later, when he was the writer for Quasar. He later incorporated them into the Marvel Multiverse, allowing crossovers with other Marvel titles, in the "Starblast" storyline:

- Part 1: Starblast #1 (January 1994)
- Part 2: Quasar #54 (January 1994)
- Part 3: The Secret Defenders #11 (January 1994)
- Part 4: Starblast #2 (February 1994)
- Part 5: Quasar #55 (February 1994)
- Part 6: Namor the Sub-Mariner #47 (February 1994)
- Part 7: Fantastic Four #385 (February 1994)
- Part 8: Starblast #3 (March 1994)
- Part 9: Namor the Sub-Mariner #48 (March 1994)
- Part 10: Quasar #56 (March 1994)
- Part 11: Fantastic Four #386 (March 1994)
- Part 12: Starblast #4 (April 1994)

In addition, Namor the Sub-Mariner #46, Quasar #31-53, and Quasar #57-60 were unnumbered tie-ins to the crossover.

In this crossover, Kayla Ballantine is Quasar's secretary at the time that she receives the Star Brand. Once her powers begin to manifest, she becomes the target of numerous alien individuals and groups. These include: the Dance, the Chief Examiner, and a group of interplanetary marauders known as the Starblasters. Quasar recruits some of Earth's most powerful heroes to stop them when the Starblasters try to push the moon away from Earth’s orbit.

The Imperial Guard were informed about a hijacked Shi'ar craft and later joined Quasar. When it becomes clear that the Starblasters are working for the Stranger, Guard members Solar Wind, Voyager and Moondancer opt to help Quasar's team against the Stranger, even though it means they have to resign from active Guard duty. These three Guardsmen were once captured and caged by the Stranger some years before. After helping Quasar, these three 'former' Guardsmen are never seen again serving the Shi'ar Imperial Guard, and their whereabouts are unknown.

Ballantine would eventually pass the Star Brand on to the Stranger in order to prevent Skeletron (the leader of the Starblasters) from forcibly taking the Star Brand. The Stranger uses the Star Brand to move the Earth of the New Universe into orbit around his Labworld. The Living Tribunal then judges the Star Brand to be a threat to the hierarchy of the greater powers of the Marvel Multiverse. The New Universe's Earth is quarantined and surrounded by an impenetrable energy barrier so that no one can enter or leave it, and none of the greater powers are ever allowed to observe it again. After the threat posed by the Starblasters is over, the Star Brand is returned to Ballantine. She remains on the New Universe Earth after it is moved into the Marvel Universe and cut off from the rest of that universe.

=== 2005–present ===
The Official Handbook of the Marvel Universe: Alternate Universes 2005 features a two-page entry on the New Universe wherein New Universe Earth is designated Earth-148611.

In late 2005, the Exiles find a Proteus-possessed Mimic in an approximation of New Universe era Pittsburgh. After observing this world, Proteus becomes determined to retrieve the most powerful weapon in the known universe, the Star Brand, by attempting to take the body of Ken Connell. He also encounters Justice, DP 7, and Nightmask. This arc runs through Exiles #72–74 and is the second of six stops on the "World Tour" storyline.

This alternate universe has the Marvel Multiverse designation Earth-15731 and exists circa 1986, shortly after the White Event. As a result of Proteus's actions, including the premature death of Justice, it is completely divorced from the original New Universe continuity. Other notable differences include Connell, Nightmask, and Lenore Fenzl of the D.P. 7 becoming aware of each other's existence and abilities long before the characters did so in the original continuity (due to the Exiles gathering them to combat Proteus) and Connell beginning to develop a greater sense of responsibility towards the Star Brand after Proteus threatens his life and the lives of people he cares for.

In 2006, Editor-In-Chief Joe Quesada and Editor Mark Paniccia set in motion events to celebrate Marvel Comics' 20th Anniversary of the New Universe. In late February and early March, Marvel launched the Untold Tales of the New Universe, a five-week comic event that took place in a pre-Pitt timeframe in the original continuity.

These were released as a lead-in to Warren Ellis's then-forthcoming newuniversal, an ongoing title that would re-introduce the New Universe Saga to the world.

Promotional advertisement and cover of newuniversal #1, Marvel Publishing, circa 2006

The line of Untold Tales of the New Universe titles included the following:

- The New Avengers #16, Untold Tales of the New Universe - Kickers, Inc.: "Kickin' It in Hell"
- Amazing Fantasy #18, Untold Tales of the New Universe - Mark Hazzard: Merc
- Marvel Milestones: Star Brand & Quasar
- Untold Tales of the New Universe — Star Brand: "Adventures in the Mulletverse"
- Untold Tales of The New Universe: Nightmask - "Kingdom of the Gnome" - this issue served as the conclusion of a story arc in the original comic never completed because of a change in creative team.
- Untold Tales of The New Universe: Justice - "Who Judges the Judge?"
- Amazing Fantasy #19 - Spitfire: "Danger Zone"
- Untold Tales of the New Universe: DP 7 - "The Dead Plains Seven"
- Untold Tales of the New Universe - Psi-Force: "An Army Of One"

New Universe reference material is given in the All New Official Handbook Of The Marvel Universe A - Z series. Issue #6 of this series features a biography of John Tensen (Justice). Issue #10 features a biography of the Starblasters, who are instrumental in Quasar: Prelude to Starblast (1992–1994) and Starblast (1994). The Starblasters had frequent interactions with many of the New Universe characters throughout these storylines. This was followed by a 2007 update series, All-New Official Handbook Of The Marvel Universe A - Z: Update, the first issue of which (January 2007) features an updated biography of Mark Hazzard: Merc, Quasar, and Spider-Man 2099. Issue #2 (March 2007) features an updated biography of Jack Magniconte, the All-American. Issue #3 (July 2007) features an updated biography of Chrome.

In November 2006, Marvel released a 1980s version of The Official Handbook of the Marvel Universe. The profiles within covered everything published by Marvel Comics in that decade and featured D.P. 7, Nightmask, and Psi-Force.

In 2007, to coincide with the 20th anniversary of the New Universe, Marvel launched newuniversal, a mini-series re-imagining of the New Universe concepts by writer Warren Ellis, artist Salvador Larroca and color artist Jason Keith. As with the original New Universe, newuniversal is set in a world where a number of people suddenly develop superhuman abilities. However, where the New Universe began with the 'real' world as its starting point, the world of newuniversal is already markedly different.

The one-shot Exiles: Days of Then and Now (January 2008) celebrates 100 issues of The Exiles and features an appearance by Jenny Swensen (Spitfire) in "Chapter 4: World Tour".

In 2013, as part of Marvel's NOW! initiative, in the fifth volume of The Avengers, writer Jonathan Hickman resurrects several concepts from the New Universe including The White Event, Nightmask and Star Brand, as well as elements from newuniversal like the Superflow.

== Collections ==
- Star Brand Classic Volume 1 (trade paperback)
  Collecting Star Brand #1-7. First printing: December 6, 2006. ISBN 0-7851-2352-0.
- D.P. 7 Classic Volume 1 (trade paperback)
  Collecting D.P. 7 #1-9. First Printing: August 15, 2007. ISBN 0-7851-2859-X.
- Nightmask: New Universe (trade paperback)
  Collecting NIGHTMASK #1-12, STAR BRAND #9, JUSTICE (1986) #15, UNTOLD TALES OF THE NEW UNIVERSE: NIGHTMASK; MATERIAL FROM DP7 #25, JUSTICE (1986) #25, STAR BRAND #16-18 First Printing: July, 2018. ISBN 9781302912574
- Psi - Force Classic Volume 1 Trade Paperback
  Collecting Psi - Force #1-9. First Printing: May 14, 2008. ISBN 0-7851-3084-5.
- Exiles Volume 12: World Tour Book 1 Trade Paperback
  Collecting Exiles #69-74. First Printing: March 15, 2006. ISBN 0-7851-1854-3.
- Untold Tales of the New Universe Trade Paperback
  Collecting Untold Tales Of The New Universe: Nightmask, Star Brand, Psi-Force, Justice, and D.P. 7; and stories from Amazing Fantasy #18-19 and New Avengers #16. First Printing: July 26, 2006. ISBN 0-7851-2185-4.
- newuniversal Volume 1: Everything Went White Premiere (hardcover)
  Collecting newuniversal #1-6. First Printing: August 15, 2007. ISBN 0-7851-2858-1.
- newuniversal Volume 1: Everything Went White Trade Paperback
  Collecting newuniversal #1-6. First Printing: April 9, 2008. ISBN 0-7851-2302-4.

== Parodies ==
- Failed Universe (Blackthorne Publishing, 1986)
- Legends #5 (DC Comics, March 1987)
- Aristocratic Xtraterrestrial Time-Traveling Thieves (vol. 2) #2 (Comics Interview, April 1987) -- a suitcase containing the embodiment of reality is hurled into the New Universe, where Ken Connell remarks, "Admit it, reality -- even confined like that, aren't you thrilled to be back home?!"
- What The--?! #2 (Marvel, September 1988) has a story starring Dr. Deranged (a parody of Dr. Strange) visiting a parody of the DC Universe, before ending up in Pittsburgh. Issue #4 (Marvel, November 1988) contains two single-page, single-panel parodies of the New Universe: "When Titans Clash" (written by Justice and Mark Hazzard: Merc writer Peter David) and "The You Universe".
