= Jack Morelli =

American comic book letterer and author

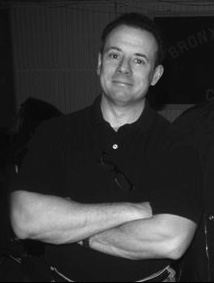
- Jack Morelli at Kids Comic Con
- Born: John Morelli; October 26, 1962 (age 64)
- Areas: Writer, Letterer

John Morelli (born October 26, 1962) is an American comic book letterer and author. He has designed many comic book logos. His lettering is notable for being the basis for the computer font used by John Byrne when he letters his own work.

Morelli was the Marvel Comics intern from 1978-79, and became a staff letterer in the Marvel Bullpen during the 1980s, where he was known by the affectionate nickname "Squid" because he had previously worked as a deckhand on a fishing boat in his native Sheepshead Bay, Brooklyn.

During this time at Marvel, Morelli also worked in editorial, was Special Projects Production Coordinator, and wrote some comics, most notably the 1998 Peter Parker Annual featuring Elektra, where he created the enigmatic supervillain Silencer.

Morelli appeared on two Marvel Comics photo covers, wearing the Spider-Man costume opposite artist Joe Jusko as Capt. America on the Marvel Team-Up #128 cover, and as Poltergeist on the Spider-Woman #50 cover.

The G.I. Joe character Dial-Tone is named Jack S. Morelli after him, with the "S" standing for his office nickname of "Squid".

Morelli has also worked for DC Comics and Archie Comics and Image Comics among many others. Grand Comics Database credits him with having worked on over 6000 stories.

In 2007, Morelli and Mark Chiarello authored Heroes of the Negro Leagues, published by Abrams, Inc., a book about the history of Negro league baseball. It was named the second best sports book of 2007 by Amazon.com.

Morelli won the 2015 Harvey Award for Best Letterer for his work on Afterlife with Archie.

== Personal life ==
Morelli is an avid weightlifter, and during the 1980s some Marvel staffers thought he looked like Namor, the Sub-Mariner.
