= Star Brand =

Comic book

- Cover to Star Brand #1, art by John Romita Jr.

Publication information
- Publisher: Marvel Comics
- First appearance: Star Brand #1 (October 1986)
- Created by: Jim Shooter

Star Brand

Publication information
- Schedule: Monthly (1–7); Bi-monthly (8–19)
- Formats: Original material for the series has been published as a set of ongoing series.
- Genre: Superhero
- Publication date: October 1986 – May 1989
- Number of issues: 19, plus 1 Annual
- Main character(s): Ken Connell

Creative team
- Writer(s): Jim Shooter; John Byrne
- Penciller(s): John Romita, Jr. John Byrne

The Star Brand is the name of a number of similar objects of power in the world of the Marvel Comics. The name "Star Brand" is also often adopted by the wielders of these objects. Three of these Star Brands have been prominently featured in series published by Marvel.

The original Star Brand is a black star-shaped tattoo-like mark that first appeared in the comic book series Star Brand, published by Marvel Comics as a part of its New Universe imprint from 1986 to 1989. All of the other Star Brands are alternates of this original version. The Star Brand gave its bearer infinite, god-like powers, limited only by the wielder's imagination. After the end of the series and the New Universe imprint, this specific Star Brand made appearances in Marvel's main shared universe, the Marvel Universe.

The second Star Brand is a glowing glyph, shaped like the original Star Brand and giving identical powers. This Star Brand is featured in newuniversal, a series featuring a universe that is a reimagining of the original New Universe that began publication in 2006. This series was abandoned, the story never completed.

The third Star Brand was introduced in 2013's Avengers Infinity and is the first to be native to Marvel's main continuity.

== New Universe's Star Brand ==
=== Publication history ===
The Star Brand was created by Marvel Comics editor-in-chief Jim Shooter to be the flagship series of the New Universe line. Mark Gruenwald's notes from the meeting in which the New Universe concept was fleshed out indicate that the original title was "Will Power", and that the name "Star Brand" was taken from an unused concept by Archie Goodwin.

The series was originally written by Shooter. The New Universe had no budget with which to hire big-name talent, so it was to Shooter's surprise that John Romita, Jr. (a rising industry star) and Al Williamson (an esteemed comics veteran) volunteered to be the penciler and inker, respectively, of Star Brand. The stories followed protagonist Ken Connell in his struggle to use his near limitless power in the right way. Jim Shooter's run on Star Brand was unique in that, unlike nearly every other superhero comic up to that time, it was not told from omniscient point-of-view, and instead showed only Ken Connell's firsthand experiences. After issue #7, Shooter was fired from Marvel, and Romita and Williamson left the series. Star Brand was taken down to bi-monthly status, and consisted of fill-in issues for the next half year.

John Byrne, at the prompting of New Universe editor Howard Mackie (a close friend of Byrne), took over both the writing and breakdowns with issue #11. Shortly after, a meeting between Byrne, Mackie, and DP 7 writer Mark Gruenwald was held to come up with a plot device to raise interest in the New Universe. The idea of the Star Brand destroying Pittsburgh was devised at this meeting and implemented in The Star Brand #12. Following this issue, Ken Connell was reduced to a supporting character, and the series became a more generalized account of the effects of the Star Brand on humankind. The series was cancelled with issue #19.

=== Powers and abilities ===
The Star Brand grants the bearer potentially infinite power, limited in application only by their imagination. What this actually means in execution varies with each depiction, though it usually includes the traditional super-powers of flight, invulnerability, super-strength and energy blasts. One user transferred the Star Brand to an inanimate object (an asteroid) in hope of ridding themselves of the burden of the power. Immediately the Brand, unchecked by a higher intelligence, released a huge amount of force in a single blast, bombarding the Earth with mutating energy endowing a small percentage of all living humans with various paranormal traits and abilities, an occurrence called the White Event.

=== Wielders ===
There were four men who wielded the power of the Star Brand during the course of the original series run:

- The Old Man is the first known wielder of the brand. Originally he claimed to be an alien warrior. Later it was revealed that he was a centuries-old Dutch trader who had received the Star Brand from a blast from the sky and had been kept alive by its power. After his failure to get rid of the Star Brand by placing it on an asteroid in space (an action that triggered the White Event), he returned to Earth and gave the brand to Ken Connell. Later regretting this decision, he attempted to trick or terrorize Ken into giving the brand back to him. He was eventually revealed to be an older version of Connell himself who had been thrown 500 years into the past by the Star Child.
- Kenneth Connell is the main character throughout most of the series. He is a car mechanic from Pittsburgh who receives the Star Brand from the Old Man in the woods while dirtbiking. Connell tries to use his powers to help others, but is plagued by his limited knowledge of the power and questions of how much he can do without abusing it. He was given a costume by the Old Man based upon his dirtbiking suit. Later, at the urging of his girlfriend Madelyne "Debbie the Duck" Felix, Connell became a traditional superhero (the first of his kind on the New Universe version of Earth), donning a spandex bodysuit and mask to openly thwart terrorists. However, during a battle with the Old Man he became flooded with excess power, and by transferring the excess to a non-living object, he unintentionally destroyed Pittsburgh in what became known as the "Black Event" (in contrast to the White Event). His guilt and the unstable power of the Brand drove him insane, and for a year he wandered the Earth aimlessly, stripped of his powers by the Star Child. He eventually regained his sanity and contributed to removing the Star Brand from his universe.
- The Star Child is biologically the son of Ken Connell and Madelyne Felix. Conceived while Connell wielded the Star Brand, he was born fully possessed and conscious of its power, growing at an extremely accelerated rate both physically and mentally; he birthed himself by bursting out of Felix's womb, unintentionally killing her in the process. In contrast to his father, he had a strong understanding of the Star Brand, but almost no understanding of the ways of the world. After several naïve attempts to improve the world, he retreated to space to meditate for an extended time on how best to apply his potential. Eventually, he realized that the Star Brand was a cosmic anomaly, having effectively "created itself" due to a time paradox, and that he, his father, and the Old Man were all actually the same person. The Star Child managed to seal the Star Brand's power away by gathering himself, Connell, and the Old Man together and locking them into a loop of time, but the Star Child neglected to isolate the power which had accidentally been transferred to pilot Jim Hanrahan.
- Jacob Burnsley was chosen by the Star Child to watch over the world while he contemplated the Star Brand's role in isolation. The Star Child chose Burnsley, a retired janitor and veteran of World War II, for his age and perceived wisdom. Burnsley was more eager to use the power than Connell, but his attempts at large-scale improvements to the world, such as the restoration of Pittsburgh, met with only limited success.

=== Writers ===
- Jim Shooter - Star Brand #1–7 (October 1986 – May 1987)
- Roy Thomas - Star Brand #7 (May 1987)
- Cary Bates - Star Brand #8–9 (July 1987 – September 1987)
- George Caragonne - Star Brand #10 (November 1987)
- John Byrne - The Star Brand #11-19 (January 1988 – May 1989)
- Bobbie Chase - Star Brand Annual #1 (1987)

=== Art ===
- John Romita Jr. - Star Brand #1–2, 4–7 (October 1986 – November 1986, January 1987 – May 1987)
- Alex Saviuk - Star Brand #3 (December 1986)
- Arvell Jones - Star Brand #8 (July 1987)
- Keith Giffen - Star Brand #9 (September 1987)
- Mark Bagley - Star Brand #10 (November 1987)
- John Byrne - The Star Brand #11–19 (January 1988 – May 1989)
- Geof Isherwood - Star Brand Annual #1 (1987)

=== Reintroduction ===
Cover to Quasar #49 featuring Kayla Ballentine using the Star Brand.

Following the dissolution of the New Universe imprint, Mark Gruenwald, the writer of the New Universe title DP7, used the Star Brand and other New Universe characters some years later in Quasar. He later used them in the Starblast limited series and crossover which ended when the Stranger used the Star Brand to move the Earth of the New Universe into orbit around his labworld.

=== Wielders ===
During this period, there were five individuals who wielded the Star Brand:

- Jim Hanrahan first appeared in the final issue of the original Star Brand series, though his last name was not given until Quasar #56. Hanrahan was a fighter pilot who during a flight encountered the Star Child, lost control of his jet, and crashed. When he awoke on the ground, he was unharmed and bore the Star Brand. The revelation of this remnant of the Star Brand surviving its destruction was the last panel of the original series, and served as a "stinger" ending to the complete story. After recovering, Hanrahan's new powers manifested and he had a recurring dream in which the Star Child saved him during his crash and used the Star Brand to heal him by imparting it to him. Fearing a repetition of the paranormal disaster which had destroyed Pittsburgh, Hanrahan kept his abilities a secret and never used them, intending for the power to die with him. Stranded in the New Universe, the hero Quasar sought him out to acquire the Star Brand's power to return home. Hanrahan spent hours questioning Quasar to learn his character before relenting and giving the Star Brand away.
- Quasar (Wendell Vaughn) returned to the mainstream Marvel Universe through the use of the Star Brand. At first, he believed that the supreme effort of bridging not just dimensions but whole quanta of reality (the New Universe was not simply a parallel reality but a fundamentally different continuum from any of the alternate Marvel Universes) had used up all the power of the Star Brand. However, Quasar's bands covered the tattoo effectively containing the Starbrand. Once back he accidentally passed part of it on to his secretary Kayla Ballantine, unknowingly imprinting the Star Brand on to the base of her neck.
- Kayla Ballantine was Quasar's secretary at the time she received the Star Brand. Once her powers began to manifest, she became the target of numerous alien individuals and groups. These include the Dance, the Chief Examiner, and a group of interplanetary mauraders known as the Starblasters. Ballantine eventually passed the Star Brand on to the Stranger to prevent Skeletron (the leader of the Starblasters) from forcibly taking the Star Brand. After the threat posed by the Starblasters was over the Star Brand was returned to Ballantine. She remained on the New Universe Earth after it was moved into the Marvel Universe and cut off from the rest of that universe.
- Ereshkigal, a Deviant who briefly succeeded in taking the Star Brand from Kayla Ballantine and began to wreak havoc with it. Ereshkigal was swiftly confronted by Quasar and the Silver Surfer. When the Living Tribunal intervened, she chose suicide over surrender, using the Brand's power to disintegrate herself.
- The Stranger's first action after taking possession of the Star Brand was to move the Earth of the New Universe into the Marvel Universe and place it in orbit around his labworld. His intention was to use it for his experiments. This was prevented when the Living Tribunal arrived and judged the Star Brand to be a threat to the hierarchy of the cosmic powers of the Marvel Universe. A barrier was placed around the New Universe Earth to quarantine it from the rest of the universe.

== newuniversal's Starbrand ==
The Star Brand seen in newuniversal: shockfront #2 (2008), art by Steven Kurth and Chris Chuckry.

Writer Warren Ellis re-imagined the New Universe and has since named it newuniversal, portraying Kenneth Connell as the Star Brand, originally from Optima Down, Oklahoma. The origin of the Star Brand is central to the entire New Universe re-imagining. The Star Brand was supposedly artificially created by a long-dead alien race as a tool that confers amazing powers to its wielder. The purpose of the Star Brand glyph (tattoo) is to help the transition of a world through the inevitable paradigm shift caused when it comes into contact with a web of strange matter, called "newuniversal structure", wherein normal physical laws operate differently. Specifically, the newuniversal web causes normal humans to become superhumans, or paranormals.

Connell represents an average man whose life is drastically changed, which is one of the major themes in newuniversal. Ken's life is a relatively normal one where the most dangerous thing about it is that the city's sheriff hates him because he is dating his daughter, Madeline Felix. After a night out drinking, Kenneth and Madeline fall asleep on a hillside. In the early hours of March 1, 2006, the White Event takes place, granting Connell the Star Brand glyph and killing Madeline.

== Other versions ==
=== Earth-616 (Prime Earth) ===
A new Star Brand was introduced into the main Earth-616 continuity in the series Avengers. College student Kevin Connor receives the brand from a flawed White Event, causing him to be selected rather than a qualified candidate. His sudden transformation results in the annihilation of his entire college, killing hundreds. Star Brand joins the Avengers when they leave Earth to fight the Builders.

Kevin Connor becomes frenzied and attacks Ghost Rider in South Africa, mistakenly believing that he is seeking to unearth an ancient Celestial that was buried there many years ago. Connor is apparently killed by Ghost Rider's Penance Stare, leaving the Star Brand symbol burned into the ground.

Months after Connor's death, the Star Brand travels into space in response to the presence of Suzanne Selby, who was hired to work on grape harvests around the Shi'ar Galaxy during her pregnancy. After she and her boyfriend are separated, Selby is detained by the Shi'ar border patrol for being an illegal alien. During transport to Ravenstarr, and as she is going into labor, Selby is given the power of the Star Brand. Selby dies in labor; the Star Brand is passed to her baby, who the Avengers name Brandy.

After being transported to another universe, Brandy is found by Rocket Raccoon and Groot, who take her in. When Brandy is a child, Rocket is hired to kill Doctor Spectrum. Brandy passes the Star Brand to Rocket, but fails to save him from being killed by Spectrum. The Star Brand returns to Brandy.

=== Fantastic Four ===
In Fantastic Four #572 (2009), one of "The Council", an interdimensional think-tank and activist group composed entirely of parallel versions of Reed Richards, wields the Star Brand.

=== Exiles ===
Alternate versions of Ken Connell and the Star Brand appear in the Exiles story arc "World Tour". This story is set in a version of the New Universe (designated as Earth-15731), prior to the Pitt.

=== Avengers Forever ===
In Avengers Forever, a version of Ken Connell appears briefly as one of the alternate Avengers fighting in the Destiny War.

=== Untold Tales of the New Universe ===
Untold Tales of the New Universe: Star Brand (2006) briefly mentions three more alternate versions that have been investigated by Arden and her fellow Lateral Shifters:

- The Star Brand of Earth-541 united the world under his own rule, appointing himself as a global monarch and imposing world peace.
- The Star Brand of Earth-723 channeled his power into music to unite the people of his world.
- The Star Brand of Earth-886 protects her world from "powerful evil forces" and is the "idol of billions".

=== Legends ===
In the DC Comics series Legends (1987), Guy Gardner battles a villain called Sunspot, who is a parody of Ken Connell and thus, by proxy, of original Star Brand/New Universe creator Jim Shooter.

=== Tyrannosaurus ===
In prehistoric times, the Star Brand fell from space, causing the extinction of the dinosaurs. A Tyrannosaurus who survived was selected as the Star Brand's first bearer and went on to protect Earth from threats.

=== Vnn ===
Millions of years later in 1,000,000 B.C., the Star Brand chose a new host, a caveman named Vnn. Vnn, Agamotto, Lady Phoenix, Odin, and prehistoric versions of Black Panther, Ghost Rider, and Iron Fist battled a Celestial called the Fallen and sealed it underground in what would become South Africa.

== In other media ==
The Vnn incarnation of Starbrand appears as a playable character in Marvel Strike Force.

== Collected editions ==
| Title | Material collected | Published date | ISBN |
|---|---|---|---|
| Star Brand Classic Volume 1 | Star Brand #1-7 | December 2006 | 978-0785123521 |
| Star Brand: New Universe Vol. 1 | Star Brand #1-10, Annual #1; Spitfire and The Troubleshooters #5 | May 2016 | 978-0785195405 |
| Star Brand: New Universe Vol. 2 | Star Brand #11-19, The Pitt #1, Untold Tales of The New Universe: Star Brand #1 | August 2016 | 978-1302900878 |
| Star Brand & Nightmask: Eternity's Children (Attend University) | Star Brand & Nightmask #1-5 | July 2016 | 978-0785196662 |
