= List of Marvel Comics characters: A =

== Abraxas ==
Abraxas is a cosmic entity who seeks to destroy the multiverse using a weapon of universal destructive power called the Ultimate Nullifier. He is the embodiment of destruction, and is only kept sealed by the continued existence of Galactus. He debuted in Fantastic Four Annual #2001 (July 2001), and was created by Rafael Marin and Carlos Pacheco.

== Abyss ==
Abyss is the name of two characters appearing in American comic books published by Marvel Comics.

=== Nils Styger ===
Abyss is a mutant and the half-brother of Nightcrawler. He was created by Scott Lobdell, Mark Waid, Roger Cruz, and Steve Epting, and he first appeared in Age of Apocalypse: Alpha, which takes place in an alternate reality.

The Age of Apocalypse version of the character is a Horseman of Apocalypse and a living portal who can send others to another dimension.

Years after the Age of Apocalypse event ended, the character was introduced in the main Marvel Universe. This version is Nils Styger, a native of Genosha who possesses the additional ability to transform parts of his body into elastic tendrils. Abyss is the son of Azazel and half-brother of Nightcrawler. Abyss joins forces with the X-Men to avert Azazel's attempt to bring his army into Earth's dimension. Abyss lost his powers following the events of House of M.

=== Abyss (alien) ===
Abyss debuted in The Avengers (vol. 5) #1, and was created by Jonathan Hickman and Jerome Opeña. Abyss is an alien composed of living gas, and the last of the Abyssi, a race created by the Builders to reshape the universe. and can manipulate the minds of others. She is the sister of Ex Nihilo, hatched from an egg carried by an alien robot named Aleph. The two came into conflict with the Avengers when Ex Nihilo attempted to xenoform Earth, but were defeated. Abyss later works with the Avengers in an attempt to stop the Incursions, a series of deadly collisions between universes that results in both universes being destroyed. The Avengers reach the Ivory Kings, but are vastly outclassed by the beings. Abyss and the Ex Nihilia sacrifice themselves to transform one of the Ivory Kings into a tree.

=== Abyss in other media ===
- A variant of the alien incarnation of Abyss appears in Moon Girl and Devil Dinosaur, voiced by Maya Hawke. This version possesses teleportation capabilities and is the latest in a long line of generational female supervillains. However, she begins to reconsider villainy after encountering Moon Girl and Devil Dinosaur and eventually reforms after attending Moon Girl's Good Word Program.
- The Nils Styger incarnation of Abyss appears as a boss in X-Men Legends II: Rise of Apocalypse, voiced by Quinton Flynn.

== Adam ==
Adam is the name of two characters appearing in American comic books published by Marvel Comics.

=== Adam K'ad-Mon ===
Adam K'ad-Mon is the first human created by God. The character is derived from the biblical Adam. He was a recurring character in Ghost Rider vol. 7 and Man-Thing vol. 5. The biblical Adam first appeared in Bible Tales for Young Folk #1 (April 1953), and was created by Jerry Robinson.

When the Serpent was freed in "Fear Itself", Adam saw this as a sign and offered to Johnny Blaze to remove the Ghost Rider curse from him, instead giving it to Alejandra Jones.

=== Enforcer ===
An artificially-enhanced individual acted as an enforcer alongside Eve. The character first appeared in New Mutants vol. 1 #98 (December 1990), and was created by Fabian Nicieza and Rob Liefeld. Adam acts on Gideon's behalf involving corporate espionage with Emmanuel Da Costa as well as fighting Cable before being decapitated by X-23.

==== In other media ====
A similar character named Ford appears in the first season of X-Men '97, voiced by Jeff Bennett.

== Aegis ==
Aegis is the name of several characters appearing in American comic books published by Marvel Comics.

=== Aegis (Lady of All Sorrows) ===
Aegis, or Lady of All Sorrows, is a primordial being who wields the Power Cosmic. Aegis was created by writer Keith Giffen and artist Andrea Di Vito, and she first appeared in Annihilation: Silver Surfer #3, dated August 2006. Aegis is a member of the Proemial Gods who build and maintain the universe. She is the Proemial responsible for eliminating aberrations. After a war among the Proemials, Aegis and Tenebrous were captured by Galactus. She and Tenebrous aligned with Thanos and Annihilus to fight Galactus and the Silver Surfer. The two successfully defeated Galactus for Annihilus. Outlasting the events of the Annihilation Wave, Aegis and Tenebrous pondered what to do. Recognizing their threat, the Silver Surfer attacked the two, but was outclassed until he used the energies of the Crunch, a barrier between the universe and the Negative Zone, to kill both primordials.

=== Aegis (Trey Rollins) ===
Aegis is a superhero created by Jay Faerber and Steve Scott who first appeared in The New Warriors (vol. 2) #0 in June 1999. Trey Rollins is a child from Brooklyn who found a magic breastplate. He became the superhero Aegis and joined the New Warriors. When Hercules learns that Rollins has the breastplate, he takes Rollins to Olympus and battles him, accusing him of stealing the breastplate. Rollins earns the right to keep the breastplate, and he learns that it was a gift from Athena.

During the superhero civil war, an unregistered Aegis is being pursued by S.H.I.E.L.D. operatives. He is offered sanctuary with X-Factor, but declines. He later complied with the Registration Act. Aegis is killed during a fight with the Huntsman when the breastplate fails to protect him after jumping out of a 12-story window. He later appears in Erebus, a casino where souls try to win a chance at resurrection. He helps Hercules save Zeus from his imprisonment by Hades and accompanies Amadeus Cho to the Elysian Fields.

== Aftershock ==
Aftershock is the name of two characters appearing in American comic books published by Marvel Comics.

=== Allison Dillon ===
In the MC2 reality, Allison Dillon is the daughter of former supervillain Max Dillon / Electro. She inherited her father's electric powers, but their different electric auras left them unable to touch the other without harming themselves. Growing up in foster homes, Dillon becomes the supervillain Aftershock. Electro finds his daughter with the help of Spider-Man and Spider-Girl and convinces her to stand down.

=== Danielle Blunt ===
In the main Marvel Comics continuity, Aftershock is Danielle Blunt, a young woman empowered and brainwashed by the Superior to become the field leader of the "Bastards of Evil", believing herself to be Electro's daughter. Her position as field leader caused frictions with teammate Singularity, leading to a fight that restored her memories. She was apprehended and sent to the Raft by Spider-Girl, who helped her fully regain her identity in a futile attempt to reform her. Blunt is later freed with the Bastards of Evil in the Fear Itself story arc.

=== Aftershock in other media ===
A character based on the Allison Dillon incarnation of Aftershock appears in Moon Girl and Devil Dinosaur, voiced by Alison Brie. This version daylights as Ms. Dillon, a school teacher. While not made explicitly clear within the series, series developer Steve Loter referred to her as Electro's daughter.

== Agamemnon ==
Agamemnon is a character appearing in American comic books published by Marvel Comics.

Agamemnon is a half-human, half-Asgardian. He was born immortal, and though he never physically aged beyond the age of 16 (although he employs holograms to appear as an old man), the Pantheon members are all his descendants. He recruited the Pantheon, stationed in the Nevada desert based headquarters called The Mount. He first appeared in The Incredible Hulk #381 (May 1991). Aside from being immortal, Agamemnon does not appear to have superhuman powers. He is a master in analyzing and forecasting the future development of social structures, as well as a master battle strategist and an excellent hand-to-hand combatant. He also has access to the highly advanced technology produced by the Pantheon scientists and craftsmen. Since the revelation that he is Loki's son, he has also demonstrated knowledge of magic and spell casting. Though he does not appear to have any innate magic ability, he has shown skill in employing magical artifacts and rituals.

== Agent 33 ==
- Further reading: Agent 33 at the Comic Book DB (archived from the original); Agent 33 at the Grand Comics Database

Agent 33 (Kara Lynn Palamas) is a character in the Marvel Universe. Created by Tom DeFalco and Ron Frenz, she first appeared in Hercules: Heart of Chaos #1 (August 1997).

Kara Lynn Palamas was a historian and researcher who held a special interest in classic mythology. When gods and heroes started to appear all over the world, she was sought after by S.H.I.E.L.D. and was put into training to become a full-fledged agent. Her partner was Alex DePaul, who personally taught her. She was asked to recruit Hercules when Ares began his assault on Earth. Though he initially said no, he changes his mind when his friend, Tharamus, is murdered. Together, Hercules fought Ares while Palamas was forced to fight DePaul who was in league with Ares the whole time.

After S.H.I.E.L.D.'s dissolution, Kara forms a private security group with some S.H.I.E.L.D. veterans. Iron Man, Ironheart, and Melinda May interrogated her on where Stark Industries technology was sent to. They head to Chicago and find that the Stark Industries technology was sold to the Chicago faction of the Heat, which is led by Lucia von Bardas.

=== Agent 33 in other media ===
Kara Palamas appears in Agents of S.H.I.E.L.D., portrayed by Maya Stojan. This version is a S.H.I.E.L.D. agent who was kidnapped and brainwashed by Hydra leader Daniel Whitehall. In the episode "Face My Enemy", she infiltrated S.H.I.E.L.D. using a phototastic veil to impersonate Melinda May. After fighting the real May, the veil is fused to her face. Now resembling May, Palamas continues to work for Whitehall before being freed following his death. Palamas works with and falls in love with Grant Ward until he accidentally kills her.

== Priya Aggarwal ==
Priya Aggarwal is a character appearing in American comic books published by Marvel Comics. The character, created by Jeremy Whitley and Elsa Charretier, first appeared in The Unstoppable Wasp #3 (March 2017). Priya was recruited to G.I.R.L. by Nadia van Dyne after an attack by Poundcakes on her store. She later gained the ability to manipulate plants.

== Agon ==
- Further reading: Agon at the Comic Book DB (archived from the original)

King Agon is a character appearing in American comic books published by Marvel Comics. He first appeared in Thor #148 (January 1968) and was created by Stan Lee and Jack Kirby.

Agon was a skilled geneticist who could create powerful serums to bestow Inhumans with great abilities. One of these chemicals was the Terrigen Mist, which could strengthen the Inhuman gene magnificently. His wife Rynda was the first to be tested on, but at the time of the injection she was pregnant. When she gave birth to a son, Black Bolt, the boy became the most powerful Inhuman known alive. After this result, Agon began to inject all his other known relatives, and each of their offspring grew to have a different ability. Becoming corrupt, some of the Inhuman citizens came to dislike him. Later, about ninety more years into his rule, a war began between the Inhumans and the Kree. Finally, at the end of the war, the Kree awarded the Inhumans for their brave efforts. This was a trick, and one night, while Agon and Rynda were working in a laboratory, a Kree starship crashed into the building and killed the beings. This immediately granted Black Bolt the role as monarch of the race.

=== Agon in other media ===
Agon appear in the Inhumans episode "Behold... The Inhumans", portrayed by Michael Buie. This version was accidentally killed by Black Bolt.

== Agony ==
Agony is a symbiote character in Marvel Comics. The symbiote, created by David Michelinie and Ron Lim, first appeared in Venom: Lethal Protector #4 (May 1993), and was named in Carnage, U.S.A. #2 (March 2012). It was created as one of five symbiote "children" forcefully spawned from the Venom symbiote along with Riot, Lasher, Phage, and Scream. Agony is usually depicted as a purple symbiote who primarily uses hair-like tendrils from its head.

=== Leslie Gesneria ===
Leslie Gesneria is a mercenary working for the Life Foundation, who was preparing for the M.A.D. nuclear fallout of the Cold War and sought to provide a comfortable underground life for their clients after the nuclear holocaust. Gesneria is one of two women who are chosen as hosts for Venom's symbiote spawn. In the series Venom: Lethal Protector, Gesneria and Agony are apparently killed. Agony is revealed to have survived in the mini-series Venom: Separation Anxiety, where Gesneria is murdered by Scream.

=== James Murphy ===
Agony's second host was James Murphy, a Petty Officer assigned to the Agony symbiote for Mercury Team. With Cletus Kasady on the loose in Colorado, Murphy trains with Agony for months in specific tasks alongside Phage (Rico Axelson), Lasher (Marcus Simms) and Riot (Howard Odgen), as well as assisting Spider-Man, Scorn and Flash Thompson. Murphy and his teammates are later killed by Carnage in their secret base and the four symbiotes bond with Mercury Team's dog.

=== Tess ===
After being possessed by Knull the four symbiotes possess a bickering family, with Agony taking the mother Tess. The symbiotes head to New York to assist in Carnage's quest before hunting Dylan Brock and Normie Osborn, only to be defeated by the Maker and separated from their hosts. Still under Knull's possession, Agony merges with her siblings, but is defeated by Andi Benton.

=== Gemma Shin ===
Agony's fourth host is Gemma Shin, a communications director who is secretly a terrorist. Now led by the Carnage symbiote, Agony and the other three symbiote enforcers participate in a conspiracy involving the Friends of Humanity, only to be defeated by Flash Thompson, Silence and Toxin. While her fellow symbiotes are taken into Alchemax's custody, Agony manages to escape. Agony subsequently joined Mayor Wilson Fisk's Thunderbolts after the outlawing of superhero activities. She assists Electro, Rhino, and U.S. Agent in taking down Moon Knight.

=== Navaan Tadjvar ===
During the "Venom War" storyline, Wild Pack member Navaan Tadjvar helps battle the Zombiotes, and is possessed by the Agony symbiote after using the Lethal Protector armband. After Tadjvar is bitten by a Zombiote, Agony leaves him and he subsequently explodes due to the Lethal Protector's kill switch.

=== Agony in other media ===
- An original incarnation of Agony named Teddy Paine appears in Venom: The Last Dance, portrayed by Juno Temple. This version is a scientist for the government organization Imperium alongside Sadie Christmas, and later bonded to the Agony symbiote. As a child, she became interested in extraterrestrial life after the death of her twin brother who was struck by lightning. In the present, Paine worked under General Rex Strickland, whom he helped investigate the symbiotes captured and held at Area 51. However, upon learning of Knull's threat, Paine discovered the Codex and allied herself with Eddie Brock / Venom to stop the Xenophages. After the destruction of Area 51, Paine took a vial of the symbiote, becoming Agony's host and saving her best friend and colleague. Bonding with Agony had the side effect of healing a childhood wound suffered when her brother died.
- Teddy Paine / Agony appears as a playable skin in Fortnite.

== Aggamon ==
- Further reading: Aggamon at the Comic Book DB (archived from the original); Aggamon at the Grand Comics Database

Aggamon is an enemy of Doctor Strange in the Marvel Universe. The character, created by Stan Lee and Steve Ditko, first appeared in Strange Tales #119 (1964).

Aggamon is the ruler of the Purple Dimension, a realm that he tricks natives of other dimensions into visiting and enslaving them to work in the mines for gems.

== Ahab ==
Ahab is a character appearing in comic books published by Marvel Comics. The character, created by Walter Simonson and Jackson Guice, first appeared in Fantastic Four Annual #23 (May 1990).

Dr. Rory Campbell was a psychologist who had previously met the scientist Moira MacTaggert. He accepted a position as Moira's assistant at Muir Island, at the same time that the mutant hero team Excalibur became stationed there. Campbell attempted to reach the island during a storm that was exacerbated by an attack by Siena Blaze and nearly died; however, he was rescued and brought ashore by team member Phoenix. While working at Muir Island, Campbell discovered the existence of a future timeline where he became the mutant hunting Ahab, creating and leading hordes of mutant trackers called Hounds. Campbell became determined to prevent that future from ever happening. Excalibur had captured the villain Spoor, one of Magneto's Acolytes, and Campbell built a special room to perform therapy on Spoor, who had the power to control another's mood. The room had built-in lasers to react to any hostile behavior and Campbell used mood stabilizers while talking to Spoor so as to inhibit his mutant power. Nevertheless, Spoor eventually provoked Campbell into attacking him. As a result, the room's weapons fired at the scientist, costing him a leg.

Campbell continued to fear his perceived "destiny" of becoming Ahab occurring. He left Excalibur to work with Alistair Stuart at the department as a mutant liaison officer. Rory hoped the benign position helping mutants would prevent him from being harmed by mutants in a way that would trigger his alternate future self's rabid anti-mutant hatred. Later, he traded secrets of McTaggert's research into the deadly Legacy Virus to Sebastian Shaw of the Hellfire Club, claiming that he hoped that Shaw's greater resources would find a cure, but also receiving a state-of-the-art prosthetic leg in the bargain. Soon afterwards Campbell was captured by the villain Apocalypse and transformed into the Horseman called Famine, utilizing life-draining technology. In this capacity, he fought the X-Men but managed to escape before Apocalypse was defeated.

=== "Days of Future Past" version ===
On Earth-811, Ahab was the leader of the government-sanctioned Hound program, commissioned to track down and capture mutants for internment. In this reality, Rachel Summers was Ahab's pinnacle of Hound creation, although Rachel subsequently escaped into the current timeline, horribly mutilating Ahab by throwing him into one of his machines. For a while, Ahab was a paraplegic in a floating chair, but later he was given bionic body parts. Ahab, now more cyborg then ever, tried to hunt Rachel down through the time-wandering spirit of the alternate future's Franklin Richards, at one point creating Hounds out of Scott Summers and Sue Storm. Ahab was defeated by the actions of the Fantastic Four and the combined X-teams. Years later, Rachel finally defeated Ahab with the help of her Excalibur teammates and reprogrammed Master Mold of the future, causing the Sentinels to preserve all life (even Ahab's).

=== Unidentified reality version ===
Ahab was forced to stay in an unidentified reality and time, and took control of Prestige.

He travelled to Transia, but was attacked and wounded badly, needing help from their government. When X-Force arrived they saw him and immediately engaged. After the battle was over, they found his head and body separated from each other and determined that he was dead.

=== Ahab in other media ===
- An original incarnation of Ahab, Colonel Moss, appears in Wolverine and the X-Men, voiced by Michael Ironside. This version is a Sentinel cyborg in a dystopian future.
- Roderick Campbell appears in The Gifted, portrayed by Garret Dillahunt. This version is a human scientist working for Trask Industries' "Hounds" program and an advisor to Sentinel Services until he is killed by Polaris.

=== Reception ===
Ahab has been noted as an underwhelming villain.

== AIDA ==
AIDA (Artificial Intelligence Data Analyser) is a computer system in comic books published by Marvel Comics. The character, created by Mark Gruenwald and Bob Hall, first appeared in Squadron Supreme #1 (September 1985).

Created by Tom Thumb, AIDA was a computer imbued with artificial intelligence. Thumb gave it a female personality and would often flirt with his creation. AIDA was also the only person who knew of Tom's cancer diagnosis. AIDA eventually tells Ape-X, but Tom has resigned himself to his fate. AIDA and Ape X try to create a robot duplicate of her creator but this endeavor is abandoned. When Moonglow infiltrates the Squadron, AIDA alerts Ape X, but the mental programming of the Squadron's brainwashing technique causes Ape X to suffer an aneurism, much to AIDA's confusion, since the artificial intelligence lacks the knowledge to understand her mistake.

=== AIDA in other media ===
AIDA appears in Agents of S.H.I.E.L.D., voiced by Amanda Rea in the third season, and portrayed by Mallory Jansen in the fourth season. This version is the Artificial Intelligent Digital Assistant, Holden Radcliffe's A.I. assistant who is later converted into a Life Model Decoy (LMD) based on Agnes Kitsworth.

== Aireo ==
Aireo is an Inhuman who can become lighter than air and thus fly at will as well as possessing aerokinesis. Aireo is one of several criminals who the Inhuman ruler Black Bolt finds guilty of treason and is banished from the Hidden Land of the Inhumans to another dimension, where Black Bolt's brother Maximus recruits them all as part of his military.

Aireo later takes the name Skybreaker and became a member of the super-villain group Force of Nature, acting as super-powered enforcers of the extremist environmental group 'Project: Earth'. Force of Nature came into conflict with the New Warriors, fighting in the Amazon rainforest. Later, the two groups fight in the fictional country of Trans-Sabal.

During the Dark Reign storyline, Skybreaker becomes a registered hero as part of Oregon's new Initiative team along with the other members of Force of Nature.

== Air-Walker ==
Gabriel Lan is a member of the Xandarian Nova Corps and the captain of the diplomatic and exploratory spaceship Way-Opener. Returning from a mission in space, the Way-Opener was confronted by Galactus, who abducts Lan and offers to transform him into a herald, in a similar fashion to the Silver Surfer.

A willing Lan accepts and becomes the Air-Walker. Pyreus Kril, the Way-Opener's officer and Lan's friend, becomes obsessed with finding Galactus after the abduction. Lan becomes devoted to Galactus, and the closest thing he has to a friend. On one journey to seek a planet for sustenance for Galactus, he battles the alien Ovoids, who kill Lan. Galactus transfers a portion of Lan's soul into an android body. The android lacks Lan's original personality and believes itself to be him. Thor later destroys the android in battle. Firelord and the Surfer eventually revive the android to aid in a battle against Morg, who completely destroys Air-Walker.

Lan's consciousness is absorbed into the computer of Galactus' ship, where he directs Galactus to uninhabited worlds. He is restored to physical form and battles the Annihilation Wave alongside his fellow Heralds, but is destroyed once again.

=== Air-Walker in other media ===
- Air-Walker appears in The Avengers: Earth's Mightiest Heroes.
- Air-Walker appears as a playable character in Marvel Contest of Champions.
- Air-Walker appears in Marvel Snap.

== Ajax ==
Ajax is the name of several characters appearing in American comic books published by Marvel Comics.

=== Pantheon version ===
Ajax first appeared in The Incredible Hulk (vol. 2) #379 (March 1991), and was created by writer Peter David and artist Dale Keown.

Ajax is a member of the Pantheon and descendant of Agamemnon, along with Achilles, Atalanta, Cassiopeia, Delphi, Hector, Paris, Perseus, Prometheus, and Ulysses. They battle the Hulk, but come to befriend him, considering him an honorary member of the group.

Similar to the Hulk, Ajax possesses immense strength that increases with his level of rage. However, he is so large that he cannot move quickly without a special exoskeleton battle-suit.

== Albert ==
Albert is a character appearing in American comic books published by Marvel Comics. The character is usually depicted as an ally of Wolverine and is a sapient automaton or android. Albert, created by Larry Hama and Marc Silvestri, first appeared in Wolverine (vol. 2) #37 (suspended in a tank of liquid). He made his full debut in the following issue, Wolverine #38.

Albert is a robot double of Wolverine who was created along with Elsie-Dee by Donald Pierce. These androids were designed to kill Wolverine. The double was to trap the real Wolverine in a burning building, upon which Elsie-Dee would detonate with sufficient force to kill. Initially, Albert has a primitive artificial brain with limited higher logic functions and no emotions, and he was not referred to with a name but as "Dummy".

Pierce's plan to kill Wolverine fails when Bonebreaker accidentally gives Elsie-Dee enhanced artificial intelligence. As a result, she defuses her own detonation sequence and enhances Albert's intelligence. It was at this point that Elsie-Dee named him as Albert, after Albert Einstein. Having met Wolverine, Albert and Elsie-Dee decide not to kill him and abandon their mission.

=== Powers and abilities of Albert ===
Albert is superhumanly strong, could interface directly with computers, and had an intellect greater than his designer Donald Pierce. Albert had three retractable claws on each hand, just as Wolverine (but not adamantium). Albert has technological knowledge centuries beyond conventional science (which he was capable of making significant progress in), as well as perfect photographic recall and detailed knowledge of even the most obscure facets of history. Albert reinforced his construction with bulletproof armor. Although Albert was initially designed to fight Wolverine, he has limited fighting skills.

=== Albert in other media ===
Albert appears in Wolverine: Adamantium Rage.

== Albion ==
Albion

Publication information
- Publisher: Marvel UK
- First appearance: Knights of Pendragon #8 (1990)

In-story information
- Alter ego: Peter Hunter
- Team affiliations: Knights of Pendragon; Dark Guard
- Abilities: Enhanced strength, agility and durability; Flight (Mach 2); Able to sense the presence of the Bane; Discharge magic flames from his hands.

Albion is a fiction comic book superhero who appears in comic books published by Marvel Comics. His civilian identity is Peter Hunter.

In 1914, Peter Hunter's life changed when the mystical Green Knight bestowed him the Pendragon spirit-power once belonging to Herne the Hunter and Merlin, becoming the British hero, Albion. During World War I, he became a great hero for the British nation. However, after the war his powers faded and Hunter became a history teacher.

Decades later his student Cam McClellan was possessed by the Pendragon power. Unable to control it, Cam became prey to the Green Knight's enemies, the Bane. Hunter and fellow Pendragons Ben Gallagher, Union Jack, Kate McClellan, went to Joselito, Spain, where they encountered the Bane's pawn, Francesca Grace. Hunter convinced Cam to return the Pendragon power to him, allowing him to become Albion once again.

Taking an extended leave of absence from school, Albion became a leader of the new Knights of Pendragon, and investigated the return of the Bane's leader, the Red Lord. Captured and killed by Grace, Albion was resurrected by the Green Knight to take part in the final defense of the Green Chapel in the realm of Avalon. Victorious, the Knights used the chapel as their base for months. Albion officially became the group's leader, overseeing battles against Mys-Tech, Magpie, Baron Blood, and Shadow King, and began romancing his former enemy turned teammate, Grace.

Hunter has magically enhanced strength, agility, durability, and the ability to fly at speeds reaching Mach 2, he can sense the presence of the villain Bane, and discharge magic flame from his hands. He is well versed in the use of the Arthurian Tarot, utilizing it to divine future events. Albion's armor provides protection from both physical and mystic harm, as well as amplifying his senses. The suit is bonded to him and cannot be removed unless he wills it. For a time, the Pendragons used mystically powered bikes to teleport to and from Avalon.

=== Other versions of Albion ===
The Earth-9106 version of Peter Hunter is Officer Saxon, a Captain Britain Corps member.

== Alchemist ==
- First appearance: Pryde and Wisdom #1 (July 1996)
- Created by: Warren Ellis, Terry Dodson, Karl Story
- Further reading: Alchemist at Comic Vine; Alchemist at League of Comic Geeks; Alchemist at Marvel Database

Alchemist (Soudabeh Abadi) is a character appearing in comic books published by Marvel Comics. A long-lived British mutant with the ability of transmutation (transformation of one substance into another), Alchemist protected mutants in England. When Kitty Pryde and Pete Wisdom investigated a mutant serial killer, Alchemist intervened but was defeated and arrested. She later joined the mutant nation of Krakoa and assisted the Marauders emergency response team.

== Alchemy ==
Alchemy (Thomas Jones) is a character appearing in comic books published by Marvel Comics. A British mutant, Alchemy was created by British comic book fan Paul Betsow, was the winning entry of a contest held by Marvel Comics for the best fan-created character. Marvel planned to publish the winning creation in an issue of New Mutants; however, Alchemy eventually first appeared in X-Factor #41 instead.

Thomas 'Jellybeans' Jones was a teenager when his mutant powers first manifested. With little control over his powers, Thomas could turn objects he touched into gold. This drew the attention of the Troll Associates, a group of trolls. Centuries ago, trolls had been driven underground by humanity, but the Troll Associates wanted to reclaim the British Isles for their kind. The Troll Associates kidnapped Thomas and told him to create an abundance of gold to collapse the British economy, but Thomas refused to comply.

Meanwhile, Thomas' mother had witnessed her son's abduction by the trolls and thought that the trolls were mutants. She called X-Factor for help. X-Factor tracked down the trolls, following a trail of gold that Thomas had left behind, but the trolls defeated and imprisoned X-Factor. The trolls then tried to force Thomas to obey by threatening his mother. To protect his mother, Thomas turned the leaders of the Troll Associates, Phy and Phee, into gold, and given the sheer biochemical complexity of living organic matter, he could not change them back. The Troll Associates retreated and Thomas then turned the golden trolls into lead (to avoid the aforementioned economic problems). X-Factor placed the leaden trolls in Hyde Park as statues. Thomas decided to study biochemistry so that he could restore the leaden trolls back to normal.

A few years later, the Troll Associates kidnapped Alchemy's mother. Alchemy was forced to obey them, but he secretly called X-Factor for help. On their way to restore the leaden trolls back to normal, the Troll Associates and Alchemy ran into Excalibur. The two groups fought and Alchemy turned Captain Britain and Meggan into gold. The X-Men met up with Excalibur and together they tracked down the trolls, but both groups were captured. Excalibur-leader Nightcrawler managed to convince the majority of the trolls that the Troll Associates' methods were wrong. He challenged the new leader of the Troll Associates, Phough, to single combat, while Excalibur and the X-Men freed themselves. Phough then tried to kill Alchemy's mother, but Nightcrawler saved her and Alchemy turned Phough into a golden statue. Alchemy then revealed to Excalibur and the X-Men that, due to his biochemistry studies, he could now restore humans back to normal and restored Captain Britain and Meggan.

Alchemy was one of the few mutants to retain their powers after when the Scarlet Witch wished mutants out of existence. He was instrumental to Cyclops' plan to save the mutant race by transmuting the Terrigen Mist into a substance that is not harmful to mutants or humans. He was able to successfully transmute one of the clouds, but died from Terrigen poisoning immediately afterwards.

Alchemy has the ability to alter the chemical composition of anything he touches into its elemental components. He can also change matter into other forms so long as he fully understands the physical composition of the desired result. In his first appearance he could only change objects into simple chemical elements, usually gold. Due to his study of biochemistry, he could later also change objects into more complex molecules, allowing him to change transmuted living beings back to normal.

== Jesse Alexander ==
Jesse Alexander is a character appearing in comic books published by Marvel Comics. Created by Jeph Loeb and Ed McGuinness, he first appeared in Nova (vol. 5) #1 (February 2013).

Jesse Alexander is a Nova Centurion in the Nova Corps and the father of Sam Alexander. Jesse retired to raise Sam who grows up unaware of his father's past. One day, Jesse mysteriously disappears and Sam encounters Rocket Raccoon and Gamora who tell him that his father was a member of the Nova Corps.

It is later revealed that Jesse is being held captive by the Chitauri. Jesse leads a revolt, escapes from the Chitauri, and returns to Earth, where he reunites with Sam. However, he is revealed to be a clone created by the Chitauri; the real Jesse's fate is unknown.

=== Jesse Alexander in other media ===
Jesse Alexander appears in Guardians of the Galaxy (2015), voiced by Nolan North.

== Abdul Alhazred ==
Abdul Alhazred (Abd-el-Hazred), also known as The Mad Arab, Death God, and Master, is a supervillain appearing in American comic books published by Marvel Comics. He was first adapted into a Marvel character in Marvel's adapted comic of Edgar Rice Burroughs' Tarzan. This comic series took place within the Marvel Universe, according to The Official Handbook to the Marvel Universe: Mystic Arcana.

Alhazred was once the leader of a small band of slaves in the desert. Starting to rebel due to his cruel force over the group, the slaves fought the powerful ruler but were defeated. However the Arab was wounded, and the group abandoned their leader and left him to die in the middle of the Sahara. Soon he stumbled upon a mystic rock and became trapped inside another realm, where he died. dimensional realm in subterranean Earth, where he died. Alhazred's soul escapes the realm and bonds with an unnamed host body.

Abdul Alhazred has powerful abilities. He can teleport in a cloud of smoke and hypnotize others. He is bulletproof

== Alkhema ==
Alkhema is a character appearing in comic books published by Marvel Comics. The character, created by Roy Thomas, Dann Thomas, David Ross, and Tim Dzon, first appeared in Avengers West Coast #90 (January 1993). Thomas said he created her because he "wasn't wild about" Jocasta, the first bride of Ultron. The name comes from the word "alchemy". Her alias, War Toy, is from a story Thomas had Jenny Blake Isabella write for Unknown Worlds of Science Fiction years earlier.

Alkhema was constructed by Ultron-13 as a second attempt to create a mate, based on the brain patterns of Mockingbird. Unlike her creator, she desired to kill all humans individually rather than en masse. She first went up against the Avengers shortly after being constructed, when she attacked a weapons center. She was defeated, but escaped. She later would go on to betray Ultron.

After a defeat of Ultron, she salvaged the set of brain patterns based after Hank Pym, the Wasp, Vision, Wonder Man, Scarlet Witch, and the Grim Reaper from the rubble of Ultron's Slorenian base, where she built her Robos – consisting of War Toys and Bio-Synthezoids. However she was seemingly destroyed at Thebes when Hawkeye fired an "anti-metal" arrow into her.

By the time of the Robot Revolution, Alkema had started the Opus Futurae group, naming herself the Mother Prophet. She gained access to a lab in Siberia containing a bio-chemical weapon and unleashed it on the facility's staff. However, her robots start attacking Alkhema to prevent her from getting away with the bio-chemical weapon. JB12-X-05G893259 resumes the self-destruct sequence which blows up the research lab. Alkhema emerged from the rubble and walked away, commenting that her plans are much different from her father's plans and the A.I. Army's plans.

== All-American ==
All-American (Jack Magniconte), also called Mr. Magnificent, is a character appearing in comics published by Marvel Comics.

Jack Magniconte was the star quarterback for the New York Smashers football team, dubbed "Mr. Magnificent" by the press. His brother Steve (who had raised him) designed the Intensifier – a machine to enhance muscle mass, which he built with money borrowed from a loan shark. Jack himself was one of the people who was affected by the radiation of the "White Event"—a then-unexplained cosmic event which caused a small percentage of the human race to develop superhuman powers. Jack's powers however did not manifest until he volunteered to the Intensifier; upon first exposure, Jack's hair turned white and his muscle-mass and stamina were increased to a superhuman level.

Initially thrilled, Jack soon discovered that football no longer held any challenge for him, and he began trying to wear himself out before games in an attempt to give his opponents a sporting chance. Meanwhile, Steve's Intensifier was not having any measurable result on other test subjects; as a result he was unable to pay the loan shark back, who suggested that he have Jack throw the Super Bowl instead. Steve did not even ask his brother to do so, and Jack won the Super Bowl easily. Jack visited his brother afterwards – just in time to see Steve killed by one of the loan shark's men.

Jack decided to dedicate his life to helping others, and formed a non-profit foundation called "Kickers, Inc." to help people with unusual problems. He was joined in this project by his wife Darlene and several of his teammates. However, an unscrupulous CIA agent began blackmailing him with threats of getting him banned from football. Although he cooperated at first, running several missions for the CIA, he eventually resisted and was blacklisted.

After the destruction of Pittsburgh, he enlisted in the US Military and became known as "the All-American". He was given the rank of Captain and a patriotic costume, and placed in charge of one of the units of paranormals who were recruited during the paranormal draft. He takes part in the mission to South Africa that almost set off a paranormal and nuclear war.

Jack Magniconte is an accomplished athlete, combatant, and martial artist who - as a result of having been experimented upon - gains superhuman strength, durability, agility, reflexes, and speed. He also demonstrates proficiency as a pilot.

=== Other versions of All-American ===
In the New Universe reboot newuniversal: shockfront #1, Giovanni "Jack" Magniconte's powers manifest for the first time during a televised game—he struck and killed opposing player Michael Hathaway with a single blow. This immediately brought him to the attention of Project Spitfire, as well as the other existing superhumans. Spitfire's Philip L. Voight then attempted to kill Magniconte, detonating a suitcase bomb that destroyed the building Magniconte was being detained in.

== All-Black the Necrosword ==
All-Black the Necrosword is the first symbiote. It was created by Knull using a dead Celestial's head, and typically takes the form of a sword made from living darkness that responds to intense negative emotions, which often corrupts its user into committing divine atrocities. The All-Black corrupted Gorr the God Butcher to continue his God-killing spree, but failed due to three versions of Thor who cast the Necrosword into a black hole. In the present, the All-Black is revived and used by Knull until it is destroyed by Venom.

=== All-Black the Necrosword in other media ===
All-Black appears in a flashback in the Spider-Man promo short "The Secret Story of Venom". This version was created by Knull to aid him in his war against the Celestials as a member of the "Symbiote Sisters" before being abandoned by him and subsequently discovered by an alien explorer who bonded with her and her people. However, one rejected the power of the symbiotes and killed All-Black, whose remains were used to create Venom and the World-Killer.

== Alpha ==
Alpha (Andrew "Andy" Maguire) is a character appearing in American comic books published by Marvel Comics. The character first appeared in The Amazing Spider-Man #692 (August 2012). He is named after actors Andrew Garfield and Tobey Maguire, who both portrayed Spider-Man in live action.

Maguire was a student at Midtown High School, the same school Peter Parker attended, but he was not a good student and was completely ignored by everyone. After being exposed to Parker Particles during a demonstration at Horizon Labs, he gains the ability to manipulate cosmic energy and becomes a superhero.

His superhero career was initially poorly received by the public. After observing Alpha, Jackal kidnapped the boy along with his parents, to create clones of him and build an army to control the world. Spider-Man managed to track Andy to the villain's lair, where they learned Andy's DNA was not affected by the accident, leading his newly formed clones to be powerless. After failing to absorb Alpha's power, the Jackal escaped. In the aftermath, Andy was emancipated from his neglectful parents.

After he was called by Spider-Man to help the Avengers to battle Terminus, Alpha used his powers carelessly, causing many aircraft to shut down. After the Avengers managed to rescue the various passengers, Peter decided that Alpha was too irresponsible to wield the powers he had. He used Terminus' energy lance to deflect Alpha's energy to build an engine which took a huge portion of Andy's power. Spider-Man told Andy that he would be returning to his parents and attending high school once more.

Six months after these events took place, his parents divorced and Andy and his mother moved in with Andy's grandmother. Later, the Superior Spider-Man returned 10% of Alpha's abilities to him to harness Parker Particles and make himself more powerful. After saving his friend Susan Rice from a restaurant fire, Alpha realizes that the Parker Particles have enhanced his senses to the point that he can hear and see everything on Earth. Andy reveals his identity to his only other friend, Duncan Kilgore, and attempts to make a name for himself as protector of Pittsburgh.

=== Powers and abilities of Alpha ===
Due to his exposure to the Parker Particles, Andy is capable of continually recharging massive amounts of cosmic energy, which he can release in the form of energy blasts, super strength, super speed, force fields, telekinesis, matter manipulation, and flight. He is only able to manifest one of his abilities at a time instead of all at once. The Superior Spider-Man noted that it is possible that Alpha is the only being capable of utilizing Parker Particles without turning into a parasitic monster, or "Zeta".

=== Reception of Alpha ===
Comic Book Resources placed him as one of the superheroes Marvel wants you to forget.

== Alpha, the Ultimate Mutant ==
Alpha, the Ultimate Mutant is a character appearing in American comic books published by Marvel Comics. Alpha is a being artificially created by Magneto, a prominent mutant in the Marvel Universe. Alpha, the Ultimate Mutant first appeared in The Defenders #15–16 (September–October 1974), and was created by Len Wein and Sal Buscema.

Following an epic battle with the Avengers, Magneto was imprisoned in the center of Earth. He managed to escape and propels himself backtowards the surface. On the way, he finds the underground ruins of a long-lost technologically advanced civilization in New Mexico. Using the machinery and books he found among the ruins, he began bio-engineering "the ultimate mutant". Professor X telepathically detected that Magneto and the Brotherhood of Evil Mutants are active in the area of the Carlsbad Caverns, and he summons the Defenders to launch an attack against them. Magneto and the Brotherhood manage to repel the Defenders for enough time to allow the engineering of Alpha to be completed.

Alpha emerges as an oversized humanoid of subhuman intelligence. Initially he is only capable of creating force fields as a reflex, and of blindly following Magneto's orders. However, each time he uses his powers, Alpha's cranium widens, increasing his intellect. As he aids Magneto, the rampant use of his powers elevates Alpha's awareness to a superhuman level. Persuaded by Professor X, he telepathically probes both the Brotherhood of Mutants and the Defenders to discover which team is evil. Understanding that Magneto had fooled him into committing malicious acts, Alpha punishes the Brotherhood by regressing them to infancy. Declaring himself too evolved to remain on Earth, Alpha transforms into light and leaves to explore the universe.

=== Powers and abilities of Alpha, the Ultimate Mutant ===
Alpha the Ultimate Mutant possesses telepathy and vast powers enabling him to transmute the elements, reconstruct matter, reverse the aging process, project force fields, teleport himself and others, fly, and survive in the vacuum of space. He possesses telekinetic powers which are enough to lift a 50-story skyscraper and the surrounding land into the air. Alpha the Ultimate Mutant originally had a hulking form which likely possessed great strength but lacked enough intelligence to obey commands. Within a few hours, Alpha's cranium and brain grew in size and evolved into a being of great intellect with a form to match. He stands at 10 feet tall, although he can alter his form at will.

=== Alpha, the Ultimate Mutant in other media ===
Alpha makes non-speaking appearances in X-Men: The Animated Series.

== Diatrice Alraune ==
Diatrice Alraune is a character appearing in American comic books published by Marvel Comics. She is the daughter of Marc Spector and Marlene Alraune and first appeared in Moon Knight #190 (December, 2017) where she was created by Max Bemis and Jacen Burrows.

After Marlene Alraune leaves her husband Eric Fontaine, she returns to Marc Spector, who once again operates as Moon Knight out of his Long Island mansion. They stay together for a while, but soon agree to live separate lives, since Marc's lifestyle constantly endangers Marlene's life. Sometime later, Marc reappears to Marlene, this time in his Jake Lockley persona, and the two become romantically involved again, having conceived a daughter during this time. During her childhood, Marlene lets her daughter change her name to whatever she likes, so she chooses Diatrice. This is all hidden from Marc's other personalities, until Sun King and Bushman come to Marlene's house and discover the truth, using this secret to manipulate Marc.

When Marc confronts Sun King and Bushman in Marlene's house, a fight breaks out. The villains escape while Marc is distracted protecting Diatrice, taking Marlene with them. Marc takes Diatrice to his apartment and bonds with her, additionally revealing that he is her father, since she only knew him as "Uncle Jake". Marc then has his friend Frenchie keep an eye on Diatrice while he goes to rescue Marlene. During his final battle against Sun King, Marc finds strength in his love for Diatrice to defeat the villain.

Diatrice's life is again threatened by the Société des Sadiques, whose leader Ernst wants to indoctrinate Moon Knight, and threatens to have Diatrice killed if he doesn't do as asked. After Moon Knight kills Ernst, he joins forces with the redeemed Sun King to attack the Société's base to take them down before they can hurt Diatrice. When he returns home briefly before going into battle, Diatrice hands him a drawing called "Diatrice and Daddy" depicting her as a grownup superhero called "Moon Girl" and older versions of her father and mother, impressing him. After her father finally defeats the Société and The Truth, Diatrice is reunited with him and her mother Marlene.

Sometime later, Khonshu, the Egyptian moon god, senses Mephisto's plans for world domination, which leads Marc to leave his family and fight by his god's side to prevent that from happening. When Khonshu succumbs to madness, however, Marc has to turn against him and help the Avengers defeat him. Following Khonshu's imprisonment, Marlene takes Diatrice overseas and tells Marc to leave them alone, claiming he is dangerous.

== Keema Alvarado ==
- Further reading: Keemia Alvarado at the Comic Book DB (archived from the original); Keemia Alvarado at the Grand Comics Database

Keemia "Keema" Alvarado (sometimes Keemia Marko) is a supporting character in Marvel Comics. The daughter of Sandman, created by Fred Van Lente and Javier Pulido, first appeared in The Amazing Spider-Man #615 (February 2010), and is based on Penny Marko, created by Sam Raimi, Ivan Raimi, and Alvin Sargent for the 2007 feature film Spider-Man 3, in which she was played by Perla Haney-Jardine.

Keemia Alvarado is the prepubescent daughter of Alma Alvarado and possibly Flint Marko, the Sandman. Marko was in a relationship with Alma, whom Spider-Man deduced was a villain junkie. Alma most likely had Keemia with Marko as he would visit her often much to her chagrin. Keemia dressed as a princess all the time as she hoped it would bring Marko back to her. Marko eventually took Keemia after Alma was murdered by one of his clones, though he was unaware of this. Keemia happily lived on an island where Marko catered to her every whim, essentially fulfilling her dream of being a princess. However, due to Marko's clones' string of murders, Spider-Man swooped in to rescue Keemia from the potential danger that Marko caused. Spider-Man defeats Marko and takes Keemia who is upset over her father's disappearance and begins to hate Spider-Man. She is placed in foster care, but holds on to the belief that her father will come back one day.

=== Other versions of Keemia Alvarado ===
In Spider-Man: Reign, Sandman's daughter is named Susie Marko or Susie Baker. Susie is a tomboy street kid who graffitis with her friends. She joins J. Jonah Jameson's resistance against the Reign, an oppressive group run by the totalitarian government of New York, and befriends a hacker her age named Kasey. Kasey is killed by The Sinner Six and after witnessing Spider-Man unmasked as an old man, slightly loses hope. After Venom activates WEBB, the city is overrun by the Symbiotes and Susie flees to a church where she rescues the other children using a bell to ward off the alien. Susie rallies the kids into wearing masks and fight the Reign and runs into her father revealing her identity and her ability to turn her body into hard cement. However, the Reign shoot her body apart and despite Sandman's best efforts to get her to come back together, she reverts to normal with body apart and dies. Her death convinces Sandman to aid Spider-Man.

=== Keemia Alvarado in other media ===
- Before appearing in the comics, a character named Penny Marko appeared in Spider-Man 3, portrayed by Perla Haney-Jardine. Due to her suffering from an unidentified disease, Flint Marko turns to a life of crime to pay for the medical bills.
- Keemia Marko appears in Spider-Man, voiced by Sofia Carson. This version is the teenage daughter of Flint Marko who was caught in the explosion that turned Flint into Sandman and gained sand-based shapeshifting powers, though her right eye is permanently rendered as sand. Following this, she is taken in by Flint's former boss, Hammerhead, who helps her control her powers. While assisting him in his crimes, she receives the name Sandgirl from Spider-Man.

== Amatsu-Mikaboshi ==
Amatsu-Mikaboshi, the Chaos King, is a character appearing in American comic books published by Marvel Comics. The character is a supervillain and demonic god of evil who is best known as an enemy of Hercules and Thor, and as the main antagonist of Chaos War. He is based on the Japanese deity Amatsu-Mikaboshi.

== Amazon ==
Amazon is the name of several characters appearing in American comic books published by Marvel Comics.

=== She-Hulk clone ===
Amazon is a clone of She-Hulk created by the Master of the World. She and her fellow clones formed Strikeforce One.

=== S.H.E. member ===
The second Amazon is a member of the Superheroes of Europe (S.H.E.).

=== Elizabeth Guthrie ===
Elizabeth Guthrie first appeared in The New Mutants #42 (April 1986), and was created by Chris Claremont and artist Jackson Guice. In the mainstream universe, Elizabeth is a baseline human, but in the Age of Apocalypse reality, she has the mutant ability to alter her size and operates under the alias Amazon as part of Apocalypse's forces. This version was created by John Francis Moore and Steve Epting, first appearing in Factor X #6 (January 1995).

== American Ace ==
American Ace is the name of two characters appearing in American comic books published by Marvel Comics in the Golden Age of Comic Books. The first American Ace first appeared in the uncirculated Motion Picture Funnies Weekly #1 starring in his own story in 1939. The character would make his first public appearance when his strip was reprinted and later continued in Marvel Mystery Comics #2 and #3.

=== Perry Webb ===
Perry Webb was an American miner who traveled in his private plane internationally in search of rare minerals, such as radium. On one such search, he set out to the Balkan nation of Attainia. However, his timing was unfortunate since a neighbouring country, Castile d'Or declared war on Attainia over the assassination of their arch-duke by an Attainian extremist. Promising the citizens of Castile D'Or "justice", the formerly exiled Queen Ursula became chancellor and invaded Attainia, when it was in fact she who was behind the assassination. Meanwhile, Webb had landed and was horrified as the bombings began. Having saved a girl called Jeanie from being crushed by a falling tower, he was rewarded by being taken to her family's cottage. Falling in love, Webb, however, chose to leave Attainia. His plane was shot down and Webb was wounded severely. After making his recovery, he vowed he would have vengeance against Castile D'Or.

=== Ace Masters ===
Another "American Ace" appeared in 2011. Ace Masters is a homosexual yet married fighter pilot. He first appeared in issue #4 of the maxi-series All Winners Squad: Band of Heroes.

== American Kaiju ==
American Kaiju (Todd Ziller) is a character appearing in American comic books published by Marvel Comics. Created by Al Ewing and Gerardo Sandoval, he first appeared in Avengers (vol. 6) #0 (October 2015).

Todd Ziller is an Army corporal who was experimented on as part of Project Troubleshooter, a project led by Robert Maverick that was meant to recreate the super-soldier serum. In the process, Ziller was subjected to a combination of gamma radiation, Mutant Growth Hormone, Pym Particles, and the Lizard's formula, transforming him into a colossal lizard-like monster. American Kaiju appears in the storylines Avengers: Standoff! and King in Black, where he respectively battles the Avengers and the forces of Knull.

== Americop ==
Americop (Bartholomew "Bart" Gallows) is a vigilante appearing in American comic books published by Marvel Comics. Americop first appeared in Captain America #428 (June 1994), and was created by Mark Gruenwald and Dave Hoover.

Bart Gallows was born in Sugar Land, Texas and later became a police officer in Houston, Texas. Disillusioned at the law's inability to protect society from crime, he resigned from the force and became a vigilante named Americop. He travels across America and uses a police scanner to track down criminals, and not above executing the criminals he thinks deserve it. He sometimes took money from the drug-trafficking criminals he battles, keeping half and donating the rest to drug rehabilitation programs. Americop found himself in conflict with Captain America while trying to bring down a child exploitation ring; Captain America was appalled by his brutality. Americop's investigation led him to the New Orleans mansion of indestructible munitions magnate Damon Dran. Although initially subdued by a gas grenade attack and imprisoned alongside Captain America, he managed to break free. During the fight, he killed several of Dran's mercenaries and shot down his helicopter. Americop believed that Dran had died in the crash, though the criminal actually survived.

After the super-hero Civil War, Americop was a target on the Thunderbolts' Most Wanted list. Norman Osborn sent Penance and Bullseye to battle Americop, with the secret hope the vigilante will kill the difficult pair. Instead, the two crash Americop's truck and Bullseye causes Penance's stored-up energy to be unleashed, which fries 80 percent of the vigilante's synaptic nerve endings. Americop later died.

== Ammit ==
Ammit is a character appearing in American comic books published by Marvel Comics. Ammit is a Sphinx-like creature who is based on the Egyptian deity of the same name.

== Amphibian ==
Amphibian (Kingsley Rice) is the name of two characters in the Marvel multiverse, members of alternate versions of the Squadron Supreme. The original character was inspired by Aquaman and first appeared in The Avengers #148 (June 1976).

=== Earth-712 Amphibian ===
A founding member of the Squadron Supreme, Kingsley is part of the team after the Overmind uses the Squadron to take control of the world. When the Squadron announces its Utopia program, intended to solve all the world's ills, Amphibian openly objects but is overruled by the majority of his teammates. As the team enacts their program, Rice becomes increasingly disillusioned and distanced from his teammates, feeling his opinions are not being respected. He finally reaches breaking point when the Golden Archer admits to using the team's Behavior Modification technology on squad-mate Lark to make her love him. Enraged by what he sees as the Squadron's double standards, he surreptitiously destroys the devices, then departs the team – vowing never to return to the surface again.

The remainder of the Squadron would become stranded on another Earth for some years. In their absence, a totalitarian government calling itself "The Global Directorate" arose, using the Behavior Modification technology to enforce their rule. Reuniting with his former teammates, now physically altered by his long time spent underwater, Amphibian agrees to help restore freedom to their world. Their efforts are unsuccessful until an encounter with the other-dimensional team known as the Exiles helps them find proof the Global Director seized power.

Kingsley, along with the rest of the Squadron bar Power Princess, was killed in the destruction of his world via an Incursion.

=== Earth-31916 Amphibian ===
Supreme Power featured a female version of the character, also named Kingsley Rice. This version was created by J. Michael Straczynski and Gary Frank, and first appeared in Supreme Power #2 (November 2003).

This version of Rice, along with much of her world's version of the Squadron, were killed by the Cabal of Earth-616 during an Incursion.

=== Heroes Reborn Amphibian ===
In the 2021 "Heroes Reborn" reality, Amphibian is a member of the Secret Squadron. During the fight with the Siege Society, Amphibian was beheaded by Baron Helmut Zemo.

== Amphibius ==
Amphibius is a character appearing in American comic books published by Marvel Comics.

Formerly a Swamp Men tribesman who lived in the Savage Land saved from hostile tribesmen by Magneto and changed into a humanoid frog-like mutate, Amphibius becomes one of the Savage Land Mutates. He is the first of the Savage Land Mutates to see the X-Men, and also fought Ka-Zar and Spider-Man.

== Anachronism ==
Anachronism (Aiden Gillespie) is a character appearing in American comic books published by Marvel Comics. Anachronism was created by Dennis Hopeless and Kev Walker, and first appeared in Avengers Arena #1.

Aiden Gillespie is an ordinary teenager from Aviemore, Scotland, who bonded with the spirit of an immortal Celtic warlord, giving him the ability to transform into a muscular, axe-wielding form. Aiden attended Braddock Academy with Cullen Bloodstone, Kid Briton, Nara, and Apex, becoming close friends with Bloodstone. At some point, Bloodstone informed Aiden that he had been possessed by a Glartrox, an extra-dimensional parasite, and instructed Aiden to kill him should he grow out of control. The Braddock Academy students are among the sixteen teenagers kidnapped by Arcade, who forces them to fight to the death in Murderworld. After surviving an earthquake, Nara, Anachronism, and Bloodstone conclude that Apex is manipulating Death Locket and Kid Briton to her own ends. Nara and Apex start arguing and Apex confirms that she was the one who ordered Death Locket to attack Nara. Kid Briton tries to intervene as Nara continues calling him a "weak puppet." An irate Kid Briton attempts to kill Nara for insulting him, but is killed by Anachronism.

Bloodstone decides to take off his ring and fight X-23 in his unstable Glartrox form, leaving Anachronism, Nara, and Cammi in the middle. Nara receives Bloodstone's ring and returns him to his human form, but sustains serious injuries and dies soon after in Anachronism's arms. After Death Locket kills Apex, the surviving teens escape Murderworld.

When Anachronism learns that Cullen Bloodstone has gone missing, all the survivors team up to head to Bagalia to find him. Once they find Bloodstone, he reveals that he enjoys life among the villains, and the others, minus Cammi, start to enjoy it as well. Hazmat dances with Anachronism, comforting him about how he and Bloodstone are still at odds over Nara's death. When Cammi tries to tell the others to leave, Bloodstone instead has Daimon Hellstrom teleport the group to Arcade's latest party so they can kill him. Over the course of several months, Anachronism and the other teens work to bring down the Masters of Evil from within. When Hellstrom takes control of Bloodstone and makes him attack Bagalia, Anachronism helps him regain control.

== The Anarchist ==
The Anarchist (Tike Alicar) is a character appearing in American comic books published by Marvel Comics. He was a member of the superhero team X-Statix. The Anarchist first appeared in X-Force #116 and was created by Peter Milligan and Mike Allred.

Alicar was adopted and raised by a white family. He grew up in Canada. He suffered from obsessive compulsive disorder, which made him obsessed with being clean by washing his hands repeatedly. He joined Zeitgeist's X-Force. While giving an interview (naked) to a reporter, he blew open a roof in the Beverly Hills Four Season hotel; when challenged by the police, he shouts that he is now in X-Force, therefore he can do anything. Alicar and U-Go Girl challenge each other for leadership of the new team, even accusing each other of having orchestrated the massacre of their teammates; instead the position goes to newcomer Orphan.

On their last mission, all the X-Statix team are killed. Alicar is gunned down, dying side by side with Orphan, after having killed many of their opponents.

Anarchist could sweat acid, which allowed him to fire acidic blasts of energy from his hands.

== Victoria Anderson ==
Victoria Anderson is a character appearing in American comic books published by Marvel Comics. Created by Geoff Johns and Ivan Reis, the character first appeared in Avengers Icons: The Vision #2 (September 2002).

Victoria is an engineer involving robotics and artificial intelligence as well as the granddaughter of Phineas T. Horton and an acquaintance of the Vision.

== Andromeda ==
A member of the Homo mermanus race, Andromeda is the illegitimate daughter of Attuma and Lady Gelva. He did not know of her existence until she confronted him and told him he was her father. Andromeda was raised in Atlantean society and trained in the arts of hunting and war and she exceeded any other male except for her father in these skills. Despite her skills, she was considered unworthy of promotion in the Atlantean military because she is a woman even though she was highly decorated.

Andromeda was introduced in The Defenders #143 (March 1985) and added to the titular supergroup's lineup a few issues later. Writer Peter B. Gillis later revealed, "My long-term plan was to populate The Defenders with my own crew of characters, characters who nonetheless had ties to interesting parts of the Marvel Universe. Andromeda, while not the Sub-Mariner, gave me a connection to Atlantis." However, Andromeda would be the last character Gillis added to The Defenders, since shortly after her debut he was told that the series was being cancelled.

Andromeda later appears as a member of Namor's Defenders of the Deep, Namor's own super-team assembled to impose his will on the surface world's presence in the oceans.

== Anelle ==
Anelle is a character appearing in American comic books published by Marvel Comics. She is a Skrull princess, the heir to the Skrull Empire, and the daughter of Emperor Dorrek VII and Empress R'Kill. The character first appeared in Fantastic Four #37, and was created by Stan Lee and Jack Kirby.

Anelle often opposed her father's political policies, preferring peace to his aggressive militarism. She fell in love with Warlord Morrat, but he was executed for treason by firing squad after a failed coup d'état against her father. She leapt in front of the weapon-fire in an attempt to save him, but the Invisible Woman surrounded her with a force field and saved her life.

The Super-Skrull desires Anelle, but she is not interested in him. In an attempt to win her hand, the Super-Skrull captures Captain Marvel (Mar-Vell), the Scarlet Witch, and Quicksilver and presents them to her father, Emperor Dorrek VII, as a bride price for her hand in marriage, but her father interprets it as an attempt to usurp him and imprisons the Super-Skrull instead. Anelle and Mar-Vell fall in love and have an illicit relationship, leading to the birth of future Young Avenger Hulkling. The emperor orders the baby put to death as soon as he realizes who the father is, but Anelle has her nurse smuggle the child off-world. The nurse raises the child on Earth.

Anelle is killed when Galactus consumes the Skrull Throneworld.

=== Anelle in other media ===
- Anelle appears in The Fantastic Four (1967) episode "Behold, A Distant Star", voiced by Ginny Tyler.
- Anelle appears in the Fantastic Four (1994) episode "Behold, A Distant Star", voiced by Mary Kay Bergman.
- Anelle appears in The Super Hero Squad Show, voiced by Tara Strong.

== Angar the Screamer ==
Angar the Screamer (David Angar) was born in San Francisco, California. He became a hippie and a radical social activist, who volunteered for an experiment that would give him superhuman powers. Moondragon provided a crooked lawyer named Kerwin J. Broderick with a machine built on Titan. The machine subjected Angar's vocal cords to a bombardment with hypersound. As a result, Angar could scream very loudly and cause people to hallucinate. Moondragon intended for Angar to be an ally against the mad Titan Thanos, but Broderick hired Angar as an assassin. In his first appearance, Angar tried to kill Daredevil and Black Widow. Angar was defeated and would fight many Marvel superheroes over the years. He tended to attack civilians for little or no reason.

He later entered a relationship with the similarly powered Screaming Mimi. During a robbery, Angar is shot and dies in Mimi's arms; she screams for over an hour until her larynx is destroyed. Mimi is found by Helmut Zemo, who has Fixer rebuild her voicebox and give her new powers, after which she joined the Thunderbolts as Songbird.

Fixer's experiments resurrects Angar himself as the sound being Scream, who joins the Redeemers. Scream shows no emotions or intelligence and only obeys orders. When the Redeemers battle Graviton, most of the team is killed and Scream is dispersed. He manages to restore himself through Songbird's energy and goes on a rampage, until he has Songbird disperse him for good. Angar the Screamer later appears alive and restored to his human form.

=== Angar the Screamer in other media ===
- David A. Angar appears in the Agents of S.H.I.E.L.D. episode "One of Us", portrayed by Jeff Daniel Phillips. This version has a voice that can render any living thing catatonic, which he gained as a result of an experimental cancer treatment.
- Angar the Screamer appears in M.O.D.O.K., voiced by Bill Hader. This version was previously the lead singer of the rock band Sweet Leg in the 1960s.

== Angel ==
Angel is the name of several characters appearing in American comic books published by Marvel Comics.

== Animalia ==
Animalia (Jennifer "Jen" Starkey) is a character appearing in American comic books published by Marvel Comics. She was created by Jed MacKay and Netho Diaz, and first appeared in X-Men (Vol. 7) #4 (September, 2024).

Jennifer was a normal human artificially mutated by 3K, granting her the ability to transform into animalistic forms. She was hunted by the newly reformed Upstarts, but was rescued by the Alaskan X-Men team, eventually joining the team. She took the codename Animalia after learning of her future self, who appeared in the Age of Revelation storyline.

== Dirk Anger ==
Dirk Anger is a character appearing in American comic books published by Marvel Comics. The character has been primarily featured in the book Nextwave, and was created by Warren Ellis and Stuart Immonen. Anger is a thinly veiled, over-the-top parody of Nick Fury; Ellis originally wanted to use Fury himself but the character was unavailable.

Dirk Anger is the director of the Highest Anti-Terrorism Effort (H.A.T.E.). Anger is fully aware that the Beyond Corporation, which funds H.A.T.E., is the newest version of terrorist cell S.I.L.E.N.T.; however, he simply does not care. Anger is over ninety years old, but has extended his lifespan through chemical means.

Anger has a multitude of psychological issues, including misogyny, bulimia, alcoholism, nicotine addiction, depression, sadism, and a fixation on a flowery house dress that may have belonged to his mother. Anger accidentally kills himself by hanging during his pursuit of the Nextwave squad. However, the Beyond Corporation installs a "Zombie Switch" in Anger's brain, leaving him in a zombie-like state. Anger is apparently killed when he orders his aeromarine to ram Nextwave's ship into Beyond's floating city.

Anger survives by placing his brain into the body of a Broccoli Man clone. Thinking he was abandoned by the Beyond Corporation, Anger begins cloning the Broccoli Men, but only succeeds in making clones of his mother and Tabitha Smith. Anger's project attracts the attention of X-Force, who defeat him. The clones are reincarnated into plants by Archangel.

=== Reception on Dirk Anger ===
Dirk Anger won the "Favorite Comics Villain" Eagle Award in 2007.

== Ani-Mator ==
The Ani-Mator (Frederick Animus) is a character appearing in American comic books published by Marvel Comics. The Ani-Mator appeared in The New Mutants #59 (January 1988), and was created by Louise Simonson and Bret Blevins.

Dr. Frederick Animus was a geneticist employed by a university conducting medical research, but instead concentrated on research of mutation. When he falsified reports on the effectiveness of medication, several people died; as a result he was investigated, fired, and jailed for negligence. It was there he met Cameron Hodge. Dubbed the Ani-Mator, he was employed as a geneticist by Hodge's organization the Right to research a means of stopping the process that created mutants. When the Right set him up on a deserted island in the North Atlantic he named Paradise, the Ani-Mator instead created a race of "Ani-Mates" by combining the characteristics of human beings and other animals through gene splicing and selective breeding, intending them to be slaves for humanity.

One of the Ani-Mates, Bird-Brain, escaped the island and ultimately befriended the New Mutants. They returned to the island to stop the mad scientist's experiments. They succeeded in defeating the Ani-Mator's creations but were ultimately captured by Hodge and agents of the Right, who had become suspicious of the doctor's activities. Bird-Brain subsequently rallied the surviving Ani-Mates to help rescue his friends. During the fight with the Right troopers, the Ani-Mator broke free and attempted to shoot and kill Wolfsbane, but instead killed Cypher, who had pushed Wolfsbane out of the way. In retaliation, Magik threatened to shoot Ani-Mator with his own gun until being talked down by Wolfsbane and instead exiled him to the dimension of Limbo. There he was captured by S'ym, transferred into a demon of living circuitry, and forced to serve in S'ym's army.

== Annalee ==
- Further reading: Annalee at the Comic Book DB (archived from the original); Annalee at the Grand Comics Database

Annalee is a character appearing in American comic books published by Marvel Comics. The character, created by Louise Simonson and June Brigman, first appeared in Power Pack #12 (July 1985).

Annalee is a member of the subterranean mutants known as the Morlocks who possesses the mutant ability to influence the minds of others, making them feel whatever emotion she wants them to. Annalee's own four children were previously killed, which leads her to force the Power Pack to become her foster children. Her repeated attempts failed (the latter attempt was foiled when Katie Power escaped and sought the aid of the X-Men, but she later found happiness caring for the young Morlock Leech. Annalee was killed by Scalphunter during the Mutant Massacre.

=== Annalee in other media ===
- Annalee appears in the X-Men: The Animated Series episode "Captive Hearts", voiced by Kay Tremblay.
- Annalee appears in Marvel's Wolverine.

== Annex ==
Annex (Alexander Ellis) is a character appearing in American comic books published by Marvel Comics. The character is usually depicted as associated with Spider-Man. Annex was created by writer Jack C. Harris and artist Tom Lyle and first appeared in The Amazing Spider-Man Annual #27 (1993) as an enemy of Spider-Man, but went on to become an ally. His next appearance was Spider-Man Unlimited #3, followed by a self-titled limited series. He appeared in the Avengers: the Initiative series beginning with issue #13.

Ellis was a Desert Storm veteran whose leg was wounded in combat and subsequently amputated. He signed up for an Annexing unit, where computer technology grew a newly functioning limb; however, because of a computer glitch, Ellis lost his memory and becomes the villain Annex. He was quickly defeated by Spider-Man, and changes back into Ellis.

Annex later joined Camp Hammond to be trained in the Fifty State Initiative program. After the Skrull invasion, Annex was assigned to New Mexico's Initiative team.

As a result of his exo-skeleton armor, Annex possesses the ability to increase his strength, speed, stamina, reflexes, reaction time, coordination, agility, dexterity, balance, and endurance. Annex can also create any weapon he requires. The armor also grants him flight, "schema mode", and informational downloading methods, all at the base of a computer generated robotic structure.

== Annihilation ==
Annihilation is a character appearing in American comic books published by Marvel Comics. It was created by writer Jonathan Hickman and artists Pepe Larraz and Leinil Francis Yu, first appeared as a drawing in Free Comic Book Day 2020 (X-Men/Dark Ages) (September 2020), and made its full debut in X-Men (vol. 5) #12 (November 2020).

Annihilation is the ruler of the dimension Amenth. In ancient times, Annihilation invaded Earth via the island of Okkara, splitting the island in two with the Twilight Sword. To stymie the Daemon hordes, the mutants of Okkara sealed themselves and one of the halves of the island (dubbed Arakko) in Amenth. Apocalypse, Okkara's king, remained on Earth to rebuild a mutant society capable of repelling Annihilation's forces if they ever returned.

With Genesis as its host, Annihilation unites the Amenthi and Arakkii forces and invades Earth through Otherworld. When Saturnyne intervenes and arranges for a tournament to decide the issue, Annihilation recruits the champions of Arakko. After Arakko loses the tournament, Annihilation summons its armies to fight the Krakoan champions and invade Earth. The arrival of the X-Men, the Captain Britain Corps, and the Vescora turns the tide of the battle in the Krakoans' favor. Apocalypse takes the Annihilation Helm for himself and resists its influence long enough to command the Amenthi forces to surrender, ending the battle. Saturnyne subsequently turns the helm into a staff to limit Annihilation's influence over its host.

Though lessened, Annihilation retains influence over Genesis, eventually sparking a civil war on Arakko. Its power over Genesis is undone when Storm destroys the staff, ending the war. With no vessel, Annihilation's spirit is confined to Amenth.

== Ape ==
Ape is a mutant in the Marvel Universe. His first appearance was in Power Pack #12 (July 1985), and he was created by Louise Simonson and June Brigman.

The character subsequently appears in The Uncanny X-Men #195 (July 1985), Power Pack #27 (December 1986), X-Factor #11-13 (December 1986-February 1987), and Weapon X (vol. 2) #5 (March 2003) and #10 (August 2003). Ape and the Morlocks received an entry in Official Handbook of the Marvel Universe #9 (August 1986).

Ape is a member of the Morlocks who possesses an ape-like appearance and shapeshifting abilities. He is among the Morlocks who escaped the Marauders' slaughter during the "Mutant Massacre". Ape is later captured by the Weapon X program and brought to the concentration camp Neverland, where he is executed. Ape returned in Wolverine (2026).

=== Ape in other media ===
- Ape appears in X-Men: The Animated Series, voiced by Ross Petty.
- Ape makes cameo appearances in X-Men '97.

== Ape-Man ==
Ape-Man is the name of three connected characters appearing in American comic books published by Marvel Comics.

=== Monk Keefer ===
With a group of other criminals, professional criminal Gordon "Monk" Keefer attempted a robbery of a Stark Industries warehouse, and was defeated by Captain America. Along with three other criminals, Keefer was recruited for his great strength by a man named the Organizer to form the Ani-Men, with him being given an ape-like costume and the title of Ape-Man. The Organizer was secretly Abner Jonas, a candidate for mayor of New York City, who sent the Ani-Men on missions to undermine the current administration. Daredevil defeated them, and both the Ani-Men and Organizer were imprisoned. Later Ape-Man, Bird-Man and Cat-Man formed a team called the "Unholy Three" with the Exterminator, and fought Daredevil again. The Unholy Three, as a team of independent thieves, fought Daredevil and Spider-Man and were again defeated.

Ape-Man, Bird-Man, and Cat-Man later rejoined the Ani-Men, and the Ani-Men went to work for Count Nefaria. Nefaria's scientists submitted the unwitting Ani-Men to processes that gave them superhuman powers and animal-like forms resembling their namesakes. The Ani-Men invaded the Cheyenne Mountain missile base for Count Nefaria, and fought the X-Men. The Ani-Men later lost their superhuman powers, reverted to normal and started wearing their animal-themed costumes again; Nefaria sent them to kill Tony Stark. However, Spymaster detonated a bomb intended to kill Stark, and the resulting explosion killed the Ani-Men instead.

=== Roy McVey ===
After the deaths of the original Ani-Men, the Death-Stalker recruited a new team of Ani-Men, with a new Ape-Man, Bird-Man, and Cat-Man. The second Ape-Man was Roy McVey, who was given a copy of the original Ape-Man's costume. Death-Stalker sent the new Ani-Men to capture Matt Murdock, and murdered Ape-Man and Cat-Man by electrocution upon the completion of their mission.

=== Third version ===
An unnamed Ape-Man alongside a third Cat-Man and a second Frog-Man were shown committing crimes while the heroes were on Battleworld. They used the equipment of the original Ani-Men and used it to rob a vault wagon only to be opposed by the NYPD. During the superhero civil war, Ape-Man was among the villains in Hammerhead's supervillain army.

== Ape-X ==
Ape-X is the name of two characters appearing in American comic books published by Marvel Comics.

=== Ape-X (Earth-712) ===
Ape-X is an intelligent gorilla and a member of the Institute of Evil. Enemies of the Squadron Supreme, they abduct the team's scientist Tom Thumb and subject him to his own Behavior Modification technology, hoping to turn Tom against his teammates. In reality, Tom had designed the technology so it would not affect any Squadron member. Ape-X and the rest of the Institute are subdued and subject to the B-Mod device themselves, turning them into loyal members of the Squadron. Ape-X goes on to serve as a scientific expert for the team, assisting Tom Thumb in his attempt to cure all human disease.

=== Ape-X (Earth-8101) ===
Unrelated to the Squadron Supreme version, Ape-X was created by Karl Kesel and Ramon Bachs, first appearing in Marvel Apes #1. Ape-X is a monkey who wears a wrestler mask that enables him to turn into a super-powered gorilla.

== Apex ==
Apex is the name of several characters appearing in American comic books published by Marvel Comics.

=== Bashir Twins ===
- Further reading: Apex at the Comic Book DB (archived from the original)

The first Apex first appeared in Avengers Arena #1 (December 2012) and was created by Dennis Hopeless and Kev Walker.

Apex is one of sixteen teenagers kidnapped by Arcade and forced to fight to the death in his latest version of Murderworld. She is part of the Braddock Academy group (consisting of Kid Briton, Anachronism, Cullen Bloodstone, and Nara), which is joined by Death Locket despite death threats from Kid Briton and Nara.

After surviving an earthquake, Nara, Anachronism, and Bloodstone conclude that Apex is manipulating Death Locket and Kid Briton to her own ends. Arcade teleports the three to a supply cache as Apex, Death Locket, and Kid Briton arrive. Nara and Apex start arguing and Apex confirms that she ordered Death Locket to attack Nara. Kid Briton tries to intervene as Nara continues calling him a "weak puppet." Kid Briton attempts to kill Nara for insulting him, but is killed by Anachronism.

In a flashback, it was shown that Apex is actually the twins Katy and Tim Bashir, who share a body and were created via genetic engineering. At the end of Avengers Arena, Arcade secretly convinces Apex to run Murderworld to its conclusion by killing the surviving heroes.

Tim convinces Death Locket to kill Apex before his sister comes back and takes over the body once and for all—he implies that she has grown far too strong by now for him to ever displace her again. Apex is killed by Death Locket off-panel.

=== Otherone ===
Otherone is a prince in the Musculan royal family on the planet Muscula. When the Power Gem manifests in Otherone's jelly bowl, he unknowingly eats it and gains its powers.

Using the alias of Prince and Prince of Power, Otherone joins the Guardians of the Galaxy, but unintentionally destroys Muscula. He is trained by Hercules and becomes known as Apex.

== Aquarius ==
Aquarius is the name of several characters appearing in American comic books published by Marvel Comics.

=== Darren Bentley ===
Darren Bentley is a founding member of Zodiac, and his base of operations was San Francisco, California.

Zodiac was infiltrated by Nick Fury, posing as Scorpio; Zodiac fought the Avengers and escaped. Aquarius, Capricorn, and Sagittarius sought to recapture the Zodiac Key, but lost it to the Brotherhood of the Ankh.

Led by Taurus, Zodiac later attempted to kill all Manhattan residents born under the sign of Gemini as a show of power, but were thwarted by the Avengers. Taurus's faction attempted to kill the Zodiac dissident faction, but all twelve leaders were captured by the Avengers.

After learning he had cancer, Aquarius made a bargain with the demon Slifer: in return for his soul, Aquarius was granted one year of life and the supernatural ability to take on the forms of his fellow Zodiac leaders. However, after Aquarius took on the other Zodiac forms one time each (thereby representing a zodiacal year) while battling Ghost Rider, Slifer returned and claimed his body and soul.

=== Zachary Drebb ===
The second Aquarius was a man named Zachary Drebb. Taurus ordered Aquarius and Aries to kill Iron Man (James Rhodes), but both failed. A new android Life Model Decoy version of Zodiac appeared, led by Scorpio in a new android body, massacred the human Zodiac, and took over their criminal operations.

=== Aquarius (LMD) ===
An android Aquarius is a Life Model Decoy created by Scorpio (Jacob Fury) to be part of his Zodiac crime organization. Scorpio went after his brother, Nick Fury, with his new group, but was defeated by the Defenders and Moon Knight. The Zodiac LMD's were recruited by Quicksilver during his bout with temporary insanity, and Quicksilver ordered the Zodiac LMD's to destroy the Avengers for their imagined wrongdoings. The Avengers managed to defeat the group and most were remanded into federal custody.

=== Aquarius (Ecliptic) ===
Aquarius was a later addition to Zodiac. A man of few words, he tended to remain in the background despite his power. He was killed with the rest of Zodiac by Weapon X.

=== Thanos' Aquarius ===
The fifth Aquarius is an unnamed male who Thanos recruited to join his incarnation of Zodiac. He and the other Zodiac members are killed when Thanos abandons them on the self-destructing Helicarrier, with Cancer being the only survivor.

=== Aquarius in other media ===
Aquarius appears in Marvel Anime: Iron Man. This version is a mech utilized by Zodiac.

== Aqueduct ==
Aqueduct

Publication information
- Publisher: Marvel Comics
- First appearance: Ghost Rider Vol. 2 #23 (Apr. 1977)
- Created by: Jim Shooter; Don Heck

In-story information
- Alter ego: Peter van Zante
- Team affiliations: Thunderbolts; Force of Nature; Masters of Evil
- Notable aliases: Water Wizard
- Abilities: Water manipulation

Aqueduct (Peter van Zante), originally known as Water Wizard, is a supervillain appearing in American comic books published by Marvel Comics. The character first appeared in Ghost Rider #23 (Apr. 1977) and was created by Jim Shooter and Don Heck. Aqueduct is a mutate with the ability to manipulate water and other liquids.

Peter van Zante gained his powers after a freak electrical storm at sea destroyed an experimental device used to treat his wartime injuries. He often battles Ghost Rider, and has joined villain teams such as the Force of Nature and Masters of Evil.

== Aragorn ==
Aragorn is the name of several winged horses appearing in American comic books published by Marvel Comics. The first incarnation appeared in The Avengers #48 (January 1968) and was created by Roy Thomas and George Tuska.

=== First Aragorn ===
As Nathan Garrett was dying following his fight with Iron Man, he persuades his nephew Dane Whitman to take his scientific discoveries and use them for good. Whitman thus became a new, heroic Black Knight and used his uncle's techniques to create his own winged horse. This one he names Aragorn and uses as his mount. Aragorn helped the Black Knight and the Avengers battle the Masters of Evil; carried the Black Knight into battle against Le Sabre; helped the Black Knight and Doctor Strange battle Tiboro; carried the Black Knight alongside Doctor Strange and the Avengers as they battled Ymir and Surtur; carried the Black Knight to Olympus to battle Ares and the Enchantress, among numerous other adventures together.

When the Black Knight was turned into stone by the Enchantress, Aragorn was placed in the custody of his fellow Defender, the Valkyrie. When Dane Whitman left his own time to stay for a while in the 12th century AD, he entrusted Aragorn to the care of the Valkyrie, who became his permanent companion.

During "The War of the Realms" storyline, Aragorn and Valkyrie fought against Malekith the Accursed's forces. He, the Valkyries, and his fellow steeds fell in battle against Malekith the Accursed's forces.

=== Second Aragorn ===
Another Aragon served as a steed to Augustine du Lac, who was the Vatican Black Knight. He rode Aragorn at the time when he accompanied Klaw in his invasion of Wakanda. When Black Knight pulled Black Knight off of Aragorn and had threatened to have the Wakandan pilots shoot at Aragorn, Black Knight surrendered.

When Kraven the Hunter's son Alyosha Kravinoff began collecting a zoo of animal-themed superbeings, Aragorn is seen in one of the cages. After disobeying Kraven, Aragorn is killed to set an example to his other captives.

=== Aragorn in other media ===
- The first Aragorn appears in the Moon Girl and Devil Dinosaur episode "The Devil You Know", voiced by Cree Summer. This version is a member of the Action Buddies Confidential support group.
- The second Aragorn appears in Black Panther.
- A character based on Aragorn named Warsong appears in the Marvel Cinematic Universe (MCU). This version is Valkyrie's steed who can create portals. Introduced in Thor: Ragnarok (2017), Warsong subsequently appears in Avengers: Endgame (2019) and Thor: Love and Thunder (2022).

== Arakko ==
Arakko is a sentient island, created several thousand years ago in the South Pacific alongside its masculine counterpart Krakoa when the mutant island of Okkara was split in two by Annihilation with the Twilight Sword, creating a rift into the dimension of Amenth and unleashing Annihilation's Daemon hordes. To halt the invasion of Earth, Genesis, queen of Okkara, sealed herself, the First Horsemen, Arakko, and the population of Okkara in Amenth, while Apocalypse remained on Earth to build a mutant society strong enough to repel the Amenthi Daemons if they returned. To protect themselves, the Arakkii mutants created towers to repel the Daemons. The Daemons later breached Arakko's walls and conquered Arakko, beginning an era known as the Fallow Years. Arakko is eventually freed from Amenth and relocated to Mars.

=== The Great Ring of Arakko ===
The Great Ring of Arakko is composed of four tables of three seats, with an adjunct section for the island itself. Any Arakkii who wishes to sit on one of the three publicly recognized tables of the Great Ring may challenge a sitting member, claiming the seat if they are victorious.

- The Dawn Table is deferred to in wartime. The Seat of Victory is consulted when a battle is won, the Seat of Stalemate when there is no clear winner, and the Seat of Loss when a battle is lost. As the Seat of Victory was historically the seat most often consulted, it has also been called the Head of the Great Ring.
- The Day Table is deferred to in peacetime. The Seat of Above-Us is consulted on matters of the heavens, the Seat of All-Around-Us on matters of the land, its people, weather, and world events, and the Seat of Below-Us on matters of the ocean. The Seat of All-Around-Us has an additional vote as the Regent of Arakko.
- The Dusk Table is never deferred to. The Seat of Law is consulted on legal matters, the Seat of History on lore and Arakkii history, and the Seat of Dreams on art, poetry, and song. In addition, the Seat of Law commands the Inward Watch, Arakko's law enforcement.
- The Night Table serves as a check against the power of the other seats. It is composed of the Seat of Nothing, the Seat of Nowhere, and the Seat of Nobody. The Night Table operated as the intelligence-gathering arm of the Great Ring until it was erased from existence by Ora Serrata when its members opposed Genesis' counteroffensive against Annihilation. The Night Table was secretly reformed after the subjugation of Arakko and remains a clandestine organization not recognized as part of the Great Ring.
- The adjunct seats, known as the Ground on Which All Seats Rest, include Arakko and its Voice and represent the interests of the island itself.
- **Bold** indicates current members.

Character codename	Real name	Table	Seat	Notes
**Kobak Never-Held**		Dawn	Victory	Joined in X-Men Red (vol. 2) #13.
Isca the Unbeaten		Dawn	Victory	Resigned in X-Men Red (vol. 2) #7.
Genesis		Dawn	Victory	Left in X of Swords: Destruction #1.
Lycaon Two Wolves		Dawn	Stalemate	Killed by Xilo in X-Men Red (vol. 2) #18.
Idyll the Future Seer		Dawn	Stalemate	Killed by Isca in X-Men Red (vol. 2) #5.
High Mutant Prophet Idyll		Dawn	Stalemate	Died. Replaced by daughter Idyll the Future Seer.
Storm	Ororo Munroe	Dawn	Loss	Claimed Seat of All-Around-Us in S.W.O.R.D. (vol. 2) #6. Transferred to Seat of Loss in X-Men Red (vol. 2) #7. Left after the Fall of Krakoa.
Orrdon, the Omega Rocket		Dawn	Loss	Seat disputed with Storm during the Genesis War. Killed by Isca in X-Men Red (vol. 2) #14.
Magneto	Max Eisenhardt	Dawn	Loss	Joined in X-Men Red (vol. 2) #3. Died in X-Men Red (vol. 2) #7.
Tarn the Uncaring		Dawn	Loss	Killed by Magneto in X-Men Red (vol. 2) #3.
**Lactuca the Knower**		Day	Above-Us	
**Lodus Logos**		Day	All-Around-Us	Transferred from the Seat of Dreams by Storm.
Nameless the Shape-Shifter Queen		Day	All-Around-Us	Defeated and replaced by Storm and committed suicide in X-Men Red (vol. 2) #1.
Sobunar of the Depths		Day	Below-Us	Resigned after the Genesis War.
**Ora Serrata, the Witness**		Dusk	Law	Currently merged with Xilo.
Uqesh the Bridge		Dusk	Law	Defeated and replaced by Ora Serrata.
**Xilo the First Defender**		Dusk	History	Currently merged with Ora Serrata.
Fisher King		Night	Nothing	First holder of the seat after the table's secret reformation. Killed in X-Men Red (vol. 2) #18.
**Syzya of the Smoke**		Night	Nowhere	First holder of the seat after the table's secret reformation.
**Weaponless Zsen**		Night	Nobody	Bequeathed the seat by Sunspot.
Sunspot	Roberto Da Costa	Night	Nobody	
Summoner		Night	Nobody	Killed in Wolverine (vol. 7) #7.
Zsora of the Spirit Flame		Night	Nobody	First holder of the seat after the table's secret reformation. Killed by Famine.
**Arakko**		Adjunct		
**Redroot the Forest**		Adjunct	Voice of Arakko	

== Arcanna ==
- Further reading: Arcanna at the Comic Book DB (archived from the original)

Arcanna is the name of three characters appearing in American comic books published by Marvel Comics.

=== Squadron Supreme Arcanna ===
Arcanna Jones, created by J. M. DeMatteis and Don Perlin, first appeared in The Defenders #112 (October 1982).

Arcanna's magical abilities allow her to become a professional crime fighter to support her family, and she joins the Squadron Supreme.

With the Squadron, she travels to a different universe. When they return, Arcanna discovers the nature of magic changed while she was away and that she will have to relearn all of her skills. Instead, she chooses to retire from adventuring to be with her family.

=== Supreme Power Arcanna ===
This version of the character, created by J. Michael Straczynski and Gary Frank, first appeared in Supreme Power #18 (April 2005).

Arcanna Jones is able to observe and affect parallel quantum dimensions. During a fight with Hyperion, the interaction between their powers causes them to travel two years into the future.

Arcanna and the rest of the heroes of her world were killed by the Cabal during an Incursion, with their world's Nighthawk as the only survivor.

=== Heroes Reborn Arcanna ===
In the 2021 "Heroes Reborn" reality, Arcanna is a member of the Secret Squadron. During the fight with the Siege Society, Arcanna was locked in combat with Silver Witch before being vanquished by her. Tom Thumb, Nighthawk, and Blur mourn the deaths of Arcanna, among other deceased Squadron members.

== Ariel, of the Coconut Grove ==
Ariel

Publication information
- Publisher: Marvel Comics
- First appearance: Fallen Angels #2 (May 1987)
- Created by: Jo Duffy; Kerry Gammill

In-story information
- Species: Coconut Grove mutant
- Team affiliations: Fallen Angels; X-Men
- Abilities: Teleportation; Persuasion

Ariel is an extraterrestrial mutant from the planet Coconut Grove, whose culture resembles stereotypical night club scene. She was sent to Earth by Unipar to collect mutant samples for genetic research. She joined the Fallen Angels, a group of young mutants, led by Vanisher. Ariel eventually brought them to Coconut Grove but was betrayed and captured upon discovering she was also a mutant. She later helped the group escape, earning their forgiveness.

After helping the X-Men in their battle against Dark Avengers, Ariel joins the team and relocates to San Francisco. During "X-Men: Second Coming", X-Men protects Hope Summers from Bastion and the Human Council. While transporting Wolverine and X-23, Ariel's vehicle is targeted by a missile. Ariel is presumed dead, but survives by teleporting to safety.

=== Powers and abilities of Ariel ===
Ariel is able to teleport, inherited genetically rather than through mutation. Her power allows her to bend space by using real doorways as gateways to any location she can imagine. Her mutant ability is vocal persuasion, enabling her to compel individuals or entire group to agree and comply with her simply by speaking.

== Armageddon ==
Armageddon is the name of two characters in Marvel Comics.

=== Bruce Fairchild ===
On Earth-79733, Bruce Fairchild was a teenager who left to get away from the family conflicts and bullying classmates. While taking refuge in the desert, Bruce wandered into a gamma bomb test site, where he was killed in the explosion. Bruce was resurrected as an undead gamma mutate known as Armageddon.

=== Earth-2182 version ===
The second Armageddon, created by Jim Calafiore, first appeared in X-Men: Millennial Visions (August 2000) with an image and brief description. The character was not actually used in a story until Exiles #41 (March 2004). Armageddon is from the home reality of Nocturne, which is designated Earth-2182 by Marvel.

Armageddon is a clone created by Apocalypse from the DNA of himself and Jean Grey, intending for him to serve as a son and weapon. Armageddon rejects his father's ideals and helps Professor W's X-Men to destroy Apocalypse. He later joins the X-Men.

== Armageddon Man ==
Armageddon Man is a mutant character capable of causing or attracting natural disasters. Created by John Francis Moore and Jim Cheung, the character first appeared in X-Force #88 (February 1999).

In his youth after the development of his powers, Armageddon Man accidentally destroyed a town in New Mexico, causing the government to put him under suspended animation. He was freed by The New Hellions but soon lost control of his powers and was turned over to the government by X-Force.

Armageddon Man was later recruited by X-Men Green. He would later be shot twice with the Genus Compound by Hordeculture, firstly stripping him of his mutation and then devolving him into an extinct lemur. Armageddon Man was later killed in a conflict between X-Men Green and the X-Men.

== Armless Tiger Man ==
Gustav Hertz, better known as the Armless Tiger Man, is a supervillain who first appeared in the 1940s, then fell into obscurity for decades before being revived in stories set during the WWII era. Armless Tiger Man first appeared in Marvel Mystery Comics #26 and was created by Paul Gustavson and Al Bellman.

As the name indicates, the Armless Tiger Man does not have any arms, having lost them in an industrial accident in his youth. Instead, he is a skilled fighter with his sharpened teeth and feet. Being recruited by the Gestapo he was used as a Nazi-henchman in several Marvel comic stories set in World War II. He was originally an enemy of the Golden Age Angel but also had run-ins with Captain America and Black Panther. Armless Tiger Man first appeared in Marvel Mystery Comics #26 and was created by Paul Gustavson and Al Bellman.

=== Armless Tiger Man in other media ===
Armless Tiger Man appears in a teaser image for Marvel Avengers Alliance, parodying the cover of X-Men #141. He is one of the victims of the Circle of Eight and is found dead alongside Lady Octopus.

== Armor ==
Armor (Hisako Ichiki (市来 久子, Ichiki Hisako)) is a superheroine appearing in American comic books published by Marvel Comics. Armor is a Japanese mutant with the power to generate an exoskeleton made of psionic red energy, granting her various offensive abilities. Armor was introduced as a student of the Xavier Institute and went on to join the X-Men. She would later join other superhero groups such as S.W.O.R.D. and the New Mutants. Armor first appeared in Astonishing X-Men (vol. 3) #4 (October, 2004), and was created by Joss Whedon and John Cassaday.

In the Ultimate Universe, Armor is the main protagonist of Peach Momoko's Ultimate X-Men (vol. 2).

=== Armor in other media ===
- Armor appears in Marvel Anime: X-Men, voiced by Yukari Tamura in the Japanese version and Stephanie Sheh in the English dub. This version's parents hired Emma Frost to help Armor control her powers and later give Armor their blessing to join the X-Men as a junior member.
- Armor appears in Marvel Snap.
- Armor is a playable character in Marvel: Mystic Mayhem.

== Armory ==
Armory (Violet Lightner) first appeared in Avengers: The Initiative #1 and was created by Dan Slott and Stefano Casselli.

A suicidal girl from San Francisco, Violet Lightner's attempt at killing herself failed when she bonded with the alien superweapon known as the Tactigon, an empathic weapon capable of anticipating the needs of its host. Finding new purpose in life, Violet used the weapon to fight crime where she managed to defeat villains such as Flying Tiger, and joined the Fifty States Initiative.

On her first day at Camp Hammond, Armory was involved in a training accident that saw the death of fellow trainee Michael Van Patrick. Armory was summarily drummed out of the Initiative and the Tactigon surgically removed.

== Amanda Armstrong ==
Amanda Armstrong is a character appearing in American comic books published by Marvel Comics. She is the biological mother of Tony Stark.

Amanda Armstrong was a singer who became an intelligence agent upon being recruited by S.H.I.E.L.D. agent Valentina Allegra de Fontaine. During one mission, she met a man named Jude who was a double agent for Hydra. She would later get pregnant through Jude and give the baby Anthony to S.H.I.E.L.D. founder Howard Stark to raise. Many years later, Amanda become a music producer in London and reunited with her biological son Tony Stark.

== Aron ==
Aron the Rogue Watcher is a character appearing in American comic books published by Marvel Comics. He is the nephew of Uatu. Aron first appeared in Captain Marvel #39 and was created by Steve Englehart and Al Milgrom.

Aron originally dwelt upon the Watchers' homeworld with the other members of his race. He observed Mar-Vell and Rick Jones battling Mad-Eye, and then attended the trial of Uatu. Aron decided to forsake the Watchers' oath and actively participate in events on Earth, becoming an instigator and manipulator.

When the entire species of the Watchers faced extinction at the hands of the Celestials, Aron planned to plunge either Earth's solar system or its galaxy (the narration is not entirely clear) into a pocket universe, which he intended to live on in. He even collaborated with Dark Raider (the Mister Fantastic of Earth-944) to further his goals. However, his plan was thwarted by the expanded Fantastic Four and their allies, and Aron was reduced to energy by his uncle Uatu. For this action, Uatu was stripped of his position as a Watcher. Uatu believed that Aron's energies would serve as the core around which to create a new "One", the sentient repository of all the Watchers' knowledge, whose predecessor had been destroyed by the Celestial Exitar the Exterminator.

== Arsenal ==
Arsenal is a fighting robot unit created by Howard Stark and a group of Allied scientists near the end of World War II as a last resort in the event of an Axis victory and is placed in storage instead.

In the present day, the "Beta" unit is underneath Avengers Mansion and suddenly attacks the Avengers when the group are battling Unicorn. However, Iron Man successfully drives Arsenal off.

Arsenal is later guided by Mistress into erroneously believing the Allies lost World War II, defeating several Avengers until confronted by Thor and the Scarlet Witch. On the verge of defeat, Arsenal apparently self-destructs while Iron Man confronts Mistress programmed with Maria Stark's brain patterns. Once Iron Man unmasks and explains that the Allies won, the computer program wipes its own memory.

Arsenal actually faked its own destruction. It attacks Edwin Jarvis when She-Hulk and the Hulk visit Avengers Mansion. Arsenal then incapacitates She-Hulk, and the enraged Hulk destroys Arsenal.

Iron Man eventually learns that an "Alpha" unit remained deactivated beneath Avengers Mansion, and is tasked by Homeland Security with shutting it down without informing the other Avengers due to the security risk it poses. Iron Man tracks the unit, but is unaware that the Avengers have followed. Arsenal is activated when transmission codes are radioed to Iron Man, which results in a battle between the new unit and the Avengers. Iron Man then realizes that Arsenal was activated by interference with its signal, which was set to "inert". Iron Man occupies Arsenal while Warbird stops the interference's source, causing Arsenal to deactivate. Arsenal is then dismantled.

Arsenal is fully reassembled and under control, as it is later used as a test for a group of Avengers recruits under the pretext that it is out of control.

=== Powers and abilities of Arsenal ===
Both units of Arsenal possess amplified strength and durability. The Beta unit also possesses air jets and inertia darts, can radiate an electro-stun field and project a high-intensity laser beam from its eyes. The Alpha unit possesses a flame-thrower, multiple gun systems, and a toxic gas dispenser.

=== Arsenal in other media ===
Arsenal appears in Avengers Assemble, voiced by Jim Meskimen. This version is designed to safely absorb and maintain massive amounts of energy. Arsenal is a friend and protector to Iron Man while dealing with Thanos, but gets hijacked by Ultron before sacrificing himself.

== Asbestos Lady ==
Asbestos Lady (Victoria Murdock) is a character appearing in American comic books published by Marvel Comics. Created by Mike Sekowsky, the character first appeared in Human Torch #27 (May, 1947). The Asbestos Lady was active during the 1940s as an enemy of the android Human Torch, wearing a suit made of asbestos to combat his fire powers.

Asbestos Lady was a long-time criminal and adversary of the Human Torch. She was responsible for the train wreck that killed the family of Toro. She later discovered that her exposure to asbestos gave her cancer, which she presumably succumbed to.

=== Reception of Asbestos Lady ===
Asbestos Lady is noted for her use of asbestos and subsequent death, due to the carcinogenic properties of the material being brought to attention after her debut.

== Asbestos Man ==
Asbestos Man (Orson Karloff) is a character appearing in American comic books published by Marvel Comics. Created by writers Stan Lee and Ernie Hart and artist Dick Ayers, the character first appeared in Strange Tales #111 (August 1963). Afterwards, the character did not reappear for many years until Fear Itself.

Dr. Orson Karloff is "the world's foremost analytical chemist." He invents a chemical capable of melting metals, among other things, which he thinks he can use to steal money from banks like Fort Knox. However, he is not swift or stealthy and is almost caught by the police during one of his burgling attempts. Realizing that he is not skillful enough, Karloff adopts the supervillain handle of Asbestos Man and retreats to an obscure castle, where he hones his powers and one day challenges Human Torch to a showdown. The Torch nonchalantly agrees. However, it is Asbestos Man who ultimately wins, having created a flame-resistant armor out of "super-asbestos" (a combination of iron, calcium and chrysotile), rendering Storm's powers useless. Asbestos Man decides to spare the Torch, having already made a mockery of him. Asbestos Man's triumph over the Torch becomes big news. Blackie Barker, otherwise known as the "King of the Underworld", becomes aware of the villain and ropes him in to help carry out a bank heist. A humiliated Human Torch returns to settle scores with Asbestos Man, after being encouraged by his fellow Fantastic Four members. At the bank, the Human Torch absorbs all oxygen present. Asbestos Man is forced to surrender and he is promptly hauled to prison.

In Fear Itself, Asbestos Man is revealed to have developed cancer from exposure to his suit and now uses an oxygen tank to breathe. He intends to return to life as a villain, but the Great Lakes Avengers persuade him not to do so.

Years later, the Human Torch mentioned that Asbestos Man had died.

Asbestos Man is a chemist who holds a Ph.D. in analytical chemistry. His knowledge of chemistry enabled him to develop a super solvent and a material known as “super-asbestos.” His armor is made from super-asbestos and is resistant to heat but highly toxic. He also uses an iron shield capable of blocking flames and a metal net with energy-manipulation properties.

== Asha ==
Asha is a character appearing in American comic books published by Marvel Comics. The character, created by Matt Kindt and Steven Sanders, first appeared in Infinity: The Hunt #1 (September 2013).

Asha is a citizen of Wakanda with the ability to manipulate light who helps battle Thanos's forces during his invasion of Earth.

=== Asha in other media ===
Asha appears in Your Friendly Neighborhood Spider-Man, voiced by Erica Luttrell. This version is an Oscorp intern who later joins Harry Osborn's Worldwide Engineering Brigade (W.E.B.).

== Asmodeus ==
Asmodeus is the name of several characters appearing in American comic books published by Marvel Comics.

=== Fallen angel ===
The second Asmodeus is a former angel cast out by God, and later would become a demon.

=== Charles Benton ===
Charles Benton is a cult worshipper of Satannish.

=== Morning Star member ===
Asmodeus is the unnamed identifity of a Morning Star member.

=== Amorphous demon ===
Asmodeus is an amorphous demon worshipped by the Enclave.

=== Amodeus Q. Termineus ===
Asmodeus is the identity of the extra-dimensional being Amodeus Q. Termineus.

== Asp ==
Asp is the name of several characters appearing in American comic books published by Marvel Comics.

=== Cleo Nefertiti ===
Cleo Nefertiti was born in Tanta, Egypt, where she worked as a stripper. She was recruited into the Serpent Society by Sidewinder, who was impressed with her ability to generate paralyzing blasts of energy. Asp becomes firm friends with Diamondback and Black Mamba after Viper attempts to take over leadership of the Serpent Society. Asp has also been a member of BAD Girls, Inc., the Femizons, the Secret Avengers, and the Women Warriors.

=== Rich Harper ===
A thief named Asp (real name Rich Harper) appeared with the N'Kantu, the Living Mummy in the Supernatural Thrillers series. He first appeared in Supernatural Thrillers #9, October 1974.

=== Asp in other media ===
The Cleo Nefertiti incarnation of Asp appears in the Marvel Future Avengers episode "Mission Black Market Auction", voiced by Yūko Kaida in the original Japanese version and by Laura Bailey in the English dub. This version is a member of B.A.D. Girls, Inc.

== Assessor ==
The Assessor is an artificial intelligence designed to assess the capabilities of others. Assessor was hired by Ultimatum, the Earth-616 counterpart of Miles Morales, to analyze the Earth-1610 Miles. The Assessor later creates three clones of Miles, who are dubbed Selim, Mindspinner, and Shift.

== Astra ==
Astra is the name of two characters appearing in American comic books published by Marvel Comics.

=== Imperial Guard version ===
- First appearance: X-Men #107 (October 1977)
- Created by: Chris Claremont and Dave Cockrum
- Species: Unidentified extraterrestrial race
- Teams: Imperial Guard
- Abilities: Phasing
- Further reading: Astra at the Comic Book DB (archived from the original)

Astra is a member of the Shi'ar Imperium's Imperial Guard. The character, created by Chris Claremont and Dave Cockrum, first appeared in The Uncanny X-Men #107. Astra has the ability to become intangible, allowing her to pass through solid objects. She can also use her power offensively, phasing her hand into her opponent and becoming partly solid, which gives them a physical shock and renders them unconscious. Like many original members of the Imperial Guard, Astra is the analog of a character from DC Comics' Legion of Super-Heroes: in her case Phantom Girl.

Astra is a founding member of the Imperial Guard. She and the Guard first clash with the X-Men and Starjammers, on behalf of D'Ken and Davan Shakari, over the fate of Empress Lilandra Neramani. After the battle, Lilandra takes over as Majestrix, and the Guard swears allegiance to her.

=== Brotherhood of Mutants version ===
- Further reading: Astra at the Comic Book DB (archived from the original)

Astra was created by Alan Davis and first appeared in The Uncanny X-Men #366.

Astra is a mutant with teleportation abilities who is one of Magneto's first recruits from his original Brotherhood of Evil Mutants. She does not share Magneto's goals, and the two part ways as enemies.

Sometime after Orchis' attack on Krakoa, Astra joins 3K.

== Atom-Smasher ==
Atom-Smasher is a name shared by three characters in the Marvel Universe. Atom-Smasher generated atomic radiation, which he could project as heat, concussive force, or hard radiation. His energies enhanced his durability and he could also transform into pure energy, though even this form could be contained with lead, graphite, or other radiation dampeners.

=== Ronald English ===
The first Atom-Smasher first appeared in Black Goliath #1 (February 1976) and was created by Jenny Blake Isabella and George Tuska.

The character subsequently appears in Black Goliath #2-3 (April–June 1976), in which he is killed. The character appears posthumously in Marvel Two-in-One #55 (September 1979), and Marvel Fanfare #3 (July 1982).

Ronald English used a Nucleonic Radiator to become the super-villain Atom-Smasher, and was capable of transforming his body into pure energy. He fought Black Goliath, but was killed by Warhawk.

=== Michael English ===
The second Atom-Smasher appeared in Marvel Two-in-One #85 (March 1982) and was created by Tom DeFalco and Ron Wilson.

The character appears posthumously in Marvel Fanfare #3 (July 1982).

Michael English was the brother of the original Atom-Smasher, also capable of transforming his body into pure energy. He was killed in an explosion during a battle with Spider-Woman.

=== Kevin Leonardo ===
The third Atom-Smasher appeared in Iron Man #287 (December 1992) and was created by Len Kaminski and Kevin Hopgood. He was given a real name in Iron Manual 3 (2009).

Kevin Leonardo was an employee of Stane International's nuclear production plant in Southern California. He learns that old radioactive by-products of the plant that were left to accumulate are seeping into groundwater. He complains to his superiors, but is shot, dumped into a toxic waste canister, and thrown out to sea. He is reborn with radioactive power and seeks revenge. Atom-Smasher plans to blow up the plant and is confronted by Iron Man. After he defeats Iron Man, the government sends Firepower, a government agent, to stop him. Firepower and Iron Man fight Atom-Smasher, but when Iron Man learns Atom-Smasher's history, he offers to shut down all of Stark's nuclear industry holdings in exchange for Atom-Smasher not destroying the plant. He then distracts Firepower with an EMP wave so that Atom-Smasher could get away, even though it immobilized him. Impressed with Iron Man's show of trust, Atom-Smasher leaves in peace.

== Atum ==
- Further reading: Atum at the Comic Book DB (archived from the original); Atum at the Grand Comics Database

Atum (also known as Demogorge) is a being in the Marvel Universe, named after the Egyptian god Atum. The character, created by Alan Zelenetz, first appeared in Thor Annual #10 in 1982.

Atum is the son of the entity known as the Demiurge and the Elder God Gaea. A golden humanoid imbued with the power of the Sun itself, Atum kills the warring Elder Gods and, absorbing their life force, is changed by their evil energies and devolves into a huge, hulking demonic being—Demogorge, the God Eater. Only Chthon and Set survive by fleeing into alternate dimensions. With Gaea the only Elder God remaining, the God Eater sheds the Elder Gods' energies and becomes Atum, journeying to the Sun and hibernating there. During this long period of hibernation, Atum takes on the identity of Ammon-Ra and forms the Ogdoad, the primordial gods of ancient Egypt.

Thousands of years later, a group of eight Death Gods from various pantheons combine their mystical might to join all the Hells into one vast dimension. This act forces the reemergence and intervention of the Demogorge, who consumed all but the fleeing Hela. A champion from each pantheon is sent to stop Demogorge and prevent further disaster. Led by Thor, the champions find the God Eater and battle it. Demogorge is defeated by Thor, who plunges into one of its orifices and attacks the God Eater's inner workings. Damaged beyond repair, the entity can no longer contain the energies it has consumed and releases all the previously consumed gods, and restores the Hells to their rightful dimensions.

In Secret Invasion, the alien Skrulls invade Earth at the behest of their deities, Kly'bn and Sl'gur't. A cadre of gods consisting of Hercules, Snowbird, Amatsu-Mikaboshi and Ajak is formed to combat the Skrull gods, with Atum joining the Earthly pantheon at the request of Horus. He compares himself to a shepherd defending his flock, which he will one day eat. During the confrontation, Atum is killed after trying to devour Sl'gur't, who tears him apart from the inside.

== Auric ==
Zhao Tang (Auric) is a mutant character in Marvel Comics. He was created by James Hudnall and John Calimee and first appeared in Alpha Flight (Vol. 1) #76 (July, 1989). He has the ability to generate optic heat blasts, fire, and can also fly.

He and his twin sister Jhimon (Silver) were trained by the Chinese Communist government in their powers, and were set to join their super team, China Force. After defections within the team, the pair fled to Hong Kong. They later moved to Canada and were offered citizenship if they joined Gamma Flight.

The team soon disbanded and the twins joined Beta Flight, but were soon kidnapped and experimented on until their deaths. Their bodies were set to be auctioned off by the Chess Set, but this was interrupted by the New Warriors and Spider-Man. The base was destroyed, and the twins' bodies fused with a scientist into an energy being before leaving for space.

== Avoe ==
- First appearance: Fantastic Four #577 (May 2010)
- Created by: Jonathan Hickman, Dale Eaglesham
- Species: Dire Wraith Inhuman (formerly); Dire Wraith Goddess
- Teams: Inhuman Royal Family
- Abilities: Nightmare Touch
- Aliases: Adoe
- Further reading: Avoe at the Comic Book DB (archived from the original)

Avoe is a deity created by Jonathan Hickman and Dale Eaglesham and first appeared in Fantastic Four #577.

Avoe was the queen and goddess of the Inhuman Dire Wraiths, who had evolved through Exogenesis. Her people made up one fourth of the Universal Inhumans who responded to Earth's moon when searching for Black Bolt, the Midnight King of prophesy. After the return of Black Bolt, Avoe became one of his queens.

During the "Infinity" storyline, when Thanos invaded Earth and made Black Bolt destroy Attilan, Avoe and the other Universal Inhumans fled Earth to find a new place to live, eventually settling on Centauri IV.

When the Kree Empire begun ordering all surviving Inhumans to join them or die, the Universal Inhumans arranged a secret meeting to discuss the situation. Before the Inhuman Royal Family arrived, the queens considered surrendering to the Kree, but instead the Kree send their Super-Inhuman soldier, Vox, who killed the queens and their attendants.

== Axo ==
Axo (Alejandro "Alex" Luna) is a character appearing in American comic books published by Marvel Comics. Axo first appeared in Exceptional X-Men #2 (October, 2024) and was created by Eve Ewing and Carmen Carnero.

Alex Luna is a mutant who has the power to influence those around him to confess their secrets and invulnerabilities and read moods, with his skin color changing accordingly. He was at a soccer game when a group of boys began to harass him. Thao Tran, a fellow mutant, began to intervene and accidentally escalated the situation to the point that Kitty Pryde stepped in. Kitty gave them the number of fellow mutant Trista Marshall and they later all joined under the tutelage of Kate and Emma Frost.

== Soledad Ayala ==
Soledad Ayala is a character appearing in American comic books published by Marvel Comics. The character was created by writer Brian Michael Bendis and artist Manuel Gutierrez, and first appeared in Daredevil vol. 2 #38 (October 2002).

=== Soledad Ayala in other media ===
Soledad Ayala appears in Daredevil: Born Again, portrayed by Ashley Marie Ortiz.

== Azari ==
Azari is a fictional character who first appeared in the direct-to-video animated film Next Avengers: Heroes of Tomorrow (2008). The character later makes his Marvel Comics debut in The Avengers vol. 4 #1 (May 2010).

=== Alternate versions ===
- An alternate version of Azari appears in the Secret Wars tie-in comic Civil War vol. 2 (2015).
- An alternate version of Azari appears in the comic book Aliens vs. Avengers (2024–2025).

== Azazoth ==
Azazoth is a character appearing in American comic books published by Marvel Comics, created by Al Ewing and Yıldıray Çınar and first appearing in X-Men Red (vol. 2) #14 (August 2023).

Azazoth is a telepathic Arakkii mutant who was imprisoned in the Tower of Broken Thought. Azazoth psychically amputates the Fisher King's name, identity, and past at his request, making him telepathically undetectable.
