= The War (comics) =

Four-issue comic book mini-series

Publication information
- Publisher: Marvel Comics
- Schedule: Monthly
- Format: Mini-series
- Publication date: October 1989 - March 1990
- No. of issues: Four

Creative team
- Written by: Doug Murray
- Artist: Tom Morgan

The War is a four-issue comic book mini-series, published by Marvel Comics. It was the final publication in Marvel's New Universe line, and resolved a number of unfinished plotlines, as well as radically changing the New Universe setting.

== Major characters ==
=== The Platoon ===
- Major Kathi Blizzard: The ability to telepathically interface with up to a dozen people.
- Captain Jack Magniconte: Superhuman strength and endurance. Former leader of Kickers, Inc.
- Sergeant Haldeman: Possesses the ability to project extreme suffering (which he calls Weltschmertz) into the minds of others. Haldeman is a drill sergeant.
- Christopher Barrett (Metallurgist): Has a 1949 Chevy hubcap that he can apparently control with his mind. He's able to use it to fly.
- Jacob Lao (Norad): Able to create force fields against radiation.
- Bob Loeser (Pretty Boy): Has the ability to blend into social situations, looking like somebody familiar to whoever looks at him.
- Jonathan Matthews (Mapper): Powers unrevealed, though presumably related to mapping.
- Garth Mengeling (Gridlock): Able to create tubes of force in geometric forms.
- Gaylord Picaro (Pitt Bull): Superhuman strength and endurance. Previously appeared in DP 7.
- Brian Pickett (Troll): Powers unrevealed. Pickett dies early in the mini-series.
- Vincent Sahno (Shooter): Possesses superhuman accuracy with firearms.
- Jeff Walters (Blur): Possesses superhuman speed. Previously appeared in DP 7.

=== Others ===
- Harlan Mook (Blowout): Has the ability to teleport, with the unusual twist that the space he leaves explodes. The greater the distance he teleports, the greater the explosion. He is unable to handle the pressure of boot camp, and goes crazy. He becomes an assassin working for the Ayatollah of Iran after being converted by paranormal persuasion. He attempts to kill the unnamed president of the United States, but fails because of the president's own paranormal regenerative ability.
- Lieutenant Keith Remsen (Nightmask): Possesses the ability to enter the dreams of others. Because of his separation from his sister, who serves as his anchor in reality, he is losing control of himself in the dreamstate, and because of his uncertainty, he declares Mook psychologically fit. When Mook becomes unstable and begins killing, Remsen uses his powers to taunt Mook into coming after him. Mook intends to kill Remsen, but Remsen is prepared with a sidearm and kills him.

== Plot ==
The War is a sequel to The Pitt and The Draft. The Pitt told of the Black Event, the accidental destruction of Pittsburgh by Ken Connell, wielder of the Star Brand, a vast cosmic energy source. This destruction, mistaken by the U.S. government for a nuclear attack, is blamed on the then-Soviet Union, and led to The Draft - a selective conscription of the New Universe's super-powered Paranormals.

In The War #3, the conflict leads to a general exchange of nuclear missiles, but before the missiles impact, the Star Child, the son of Ken Connell who acquired the Star Brand's vast power while still in the womb, destroys the missiles, but this does not end the conflict; the Star Child temporarily disables all weapons of war on Earth, and announces his existence and powers to the entire planet, demanding that the fighting cease.
