= DP 7 =

Fictional comic book series

D.P. 7
- Art by Doug Alexander.

Publication information
- Publisher: Marvel Comics
- Schedule: Monthly
- Format: Ongoing series
- Publication date: November 1986 to June 1989
- No. of issues: 32, plus one Annual
- Main character: See main characters

Creative team
- Created by: Mark Gruenwald; Paul Ryan
- Written by: Mark Gruenwald
- Penciller: Paul Ryan
- Inker(s): Danny Bulanadi; Romeo Tanghal

D.P. 7 is a comic book series published by Marvel Comics as part of its New Universe imprint. It ran for 32 issues and an Annual (January 1987), which were published from 1986 to 1989.

The title stands for Displaced Paranormals and refers to the seven main characters of the series (who never refer to themselves as displaced). All of them received superhuman powers as a result of the stellar phenomenon known as the White Event.

D.P. 7 was the only New Universe series to maintain a stable creative team during its first year: its entire run was written by Mark Gruenwald, pencilled by Paul Ryan, and coloured by Paul Becton. Inker Danny Bulanadi (who began work on the title with issue #10) and letterer Janice Chiang (who began with issue #16) also stayed with D.P. 7 through to the final issue.

== Publication history ==
Eager for the chance to work on a "virgin universe", writer Mark Gruenwald signed on to the New Universe staff and developed D.P. 7, shocking many readers (and even editor-in-chief Jim Shooter) who saw Gruenwald as strictly associated with the Marvel Universe. In an effort to set the series apart from other team books, Gruenwald wrote an analysis of 14 superhero groups in categories such as age makeup, origin, purpose, and budget, and deliberately constructed the group to differ from these 14 established groups in every category. He originally wanted the series to be called "Missing Persons", with a line-up consisting of Antibody, the Blur, Man Power, Quicksand, Twilight, and Vice Versa. Of these six, only the Blur and Twilight were included in the finalized line-up, though the name "Antibody" was used for a completely different character and the character Vice Versa served as a minor villain of the series. Gruenwald also changed the name to "M.P. 7 (Missing Paranormals)", before Jack Morelli suggested D.P. 7. Gruenwald explained that he wanted the book to have a real punk, new wave name.

At the time that he conceived the "Missing Persons" skeleton concept, Gruenwald was working on the final issues of the Squadron Supreme limited series with penciler Paul Ryan. He invited Ryan to work with him on the New Universe series; Ryan, being intrigued by the New Universe concept and having no prospects lined up after the end of Squadron Supreme, agreed. He later recounted his experience working on the series: "Mark absolutely believed in the New Universe and especially the cast of D.P. 7. We talked about them as if they were people we knew and cared about. We brought many of our real-life experiences, both positive and negative, to the series. We loved our characters".

Despite the creators' enthusiasm, the series met with mixed reactions from readers. Many criticized the fact that, though the New Universe line-up was supposed to take place in real time, the first 13 issues of D.P. 7 (more than a year in real time) cover less than half a year in New Universe time. The remaining 19 issues were widely criticized for the way the series branched off into an increasing number of unrelated plotlines and an almost overwhelming large cast, and Gruenwald himself admitted at the time that "D.P. 7 really hasn't been seven guys for a while, and certainly not the original seven". The lack of a central plotline stemmed from the fact that Gruenwald did not plot the series more than one issue in advance. Praise for D.P. 7 tends to centre on its compelling characters, particularly mainstays Randy O'Brien and David Landers.

D.P. 7 was cancelled in June 1989 along with the rest of the New Universe line. The creators' interest in the characters remained, and in Quasar #31 (February 1992), Gruenwald had Quasar travel to the New Universe, thus allowing the D.P. 7 cast to guest star in the issue. Ryan claims that he and Gruenwald had discussed doing a D.P. 7 limited series or graphic novel, but Gruenwald died before he was able to finish the plot.

== Plot synopsis ==
Randy O'Brien first encounters David Landers when he is wheeled into the hospital in incredible pain. Landers rages until two dark arms spring from O'Brien's torso that restrain him long enough for O'Brien to give Landers a tranquilizer that renders him unconscious. The two compare their experiences, and O'Brien reads a classified ad for the Clinic for Paranormal Research, a facility designed to help individuals who have acquired strange abilities. He relays the information to Landers, and they travel to the clinic under assumed names. They are at first convinced of the clinic staff's sincerity and are enrolled into therapy group C, where they meet Walters, Beck, Cuzinski, Harrington, and Fenzl. Late one night, O'Brien's antibody intrudes on the clinic staff, at least four of whom are paranormals themselves, and learn the clinic has plans to make an army out of them, to be led by Philip Nolan Voigt, the clinic director.

Therapy group C fights off the clinic staff and the paranormal Hackbarth, who can manipulate others' nervous systems. They escape into the night and over the next few months, the paranormals adjust to life with their powers. They are eventually apprehended by bounty hunters and returned to the clinic. O'Brien and Landers, the last two to arrive, find that their friends' memories have been modified not to remember their escape or the ulterior motives of clinic personnel. O'Brien and Landers defeat Voigt and he disappears from the clinic, although he later reappears to successfully run for President of the United States in 1988.

Without Voigt and his senior staff (Hackbarth is in a coma, memory-manipulator Charne was choked to death by an Antibody, and telepathic Speck was shot) to surreptitiously maintain order, paranormals at the clinic soon form their own special interest groups/gangs (such as one composed of teenagers, and another of African Americans). The potential for disaster is soon fulfilled, and law enforcement comes in to shut the clinic down, killing many of the patients in the process. By this time, most of the reformed therapy group C (along with a few other residents of the clinic) left to find Walters, who had run to Pittsburgh where his family had been caught in a major disaster. Except for Scuzz, the Displaced Paranormals begin to work with the government after all male paranormals are drafted into the United States Army following the destruction of Pittsburgh, believed to be caused by a nuclear weapon. Female paranormals become highly sought-after assets for other agencies like the CIA. With the exception of Walters, who continues in the Army, the other paranormals either go AWOL or leave the CIA and many of them move into New York City trying to live normal lives, in the face of the public wariness of paranormals.

While in the city, some ongoing romances play out, while other paranormals decide to become part of a superhero team.

When the war is over, the paranormals (who had not been cured) return to lives that are as normal as they can be.

== Main characters ==
=== Initial members ===
- Randy O'Brien, nicknamed Antibody, is a medical resident who can project dark figures (also called "antibodies") that can fly, become intangible, and transfer their memories to another person by physical contact. All of O'Brien's antibodies appear to be identical, but he is able to tell them apart and gives them individual names. After being exposed to Pitt-Juice, O'Brien is trapped inside one of his antibodies, with the other antibodies he creates being reduced to a few inches tall. O'Brien is drafted into the Army's Paranormal Platoon, but goes AWOL, then moves to New York.
- David Landers, nicknamed Mastodon, is a cheese factory worker who possesses immense strength, allowing him to lift up to 15 tons and resist light gunfire. Mark Gruenwald's description of Landers's muscle growth was inspired by an article in a science magazine about a treatment in which electrical currents are used to contract a person's abdominal muscles, producing the equivalent of 500 sit-ups in a single minute. Landers is drafted into the Army's Paranormal Platoon, but goes AWOL, then moves to New York.
- Jeff Walters, nicknamed Blur, is a fast food restaurant manager who possesses superhuman speed. Walters' metabolism is accelerated, meaning that he requires vast amounts of food to sustain himself and that his body vibrates so fast that he cannot stand still. He is drafted into the Army's Paranormal Platoon and participates in the War. After the events of Secret Wars, Walters is transported to Earth-616 and joins the Squadron Supreme. The Squadron Supreme later disbands, leading Walters to join S.H.I.E.L.D.
- Charlotte "Charly" Beck, nicknamed Friction, is a dance student who can eliminate friction in herself and other objects, allowing her to slide at high speeds. During the Draft, Beck becomes a special CIA operative until the program is discontinued.
- Dennis "Scuzz" Cuzinski is a teenage dropout with the ability to produce a corrosive substance from his skin, which he is immune to. He can increase the rate at which he generates the substance, making his body so caustic that it can incinerate flammable material on contact. However, Cuzinski is unable to completely turn off his powers, gradually destroying his clothes and other objects that he comes into regular contact with. By the end of D.P. 7, Cuzinski joins the Cult of the White Event, which believes that paranormal powers are a gift from God. Cuzinski attempts to assassinate the Cure, a paranormal with the power to remove others' paranormalities. He is unsuccessful, leaving himself and the Cure powerless.
- Stephanie Harrington, initially nicknamed Viva and later known as Glitter, is a housewife and mother of three who can heal and energize others via contact. Harrington also possesses enhanced strength and speed. During the Draft, Harrington is recruited into the CIA until the program is discontinued.
- Lenore Fenzl, nicknamed Twilight, is a retired Latin teacher with the ability to generate luminescent energy that can paralyze or knock out those exposed to it. It is later revealed that Fenzl's energy gives her increased vitality and youth. During the Draft, Fenzl is recruited into the CIA. She is later killed battling a paranormal creature called the Famileech.

=== Later members ===
- Miriam Sorenson, nicknamed Sponge, is able to absorb moisture and release it as pressurized streams of water. She had her abilities removed by the Cure.
- George Mullaney, nicknamed Mutator, is able to uncontrollably mutate into a new form every 48 hours. He had his abilities removed by the Cure.
- Jenny Swensen, originally introduced in Codename: Spitfire, was incorporated into D.P.7 when Codename: Spitfire was canceled. Exposure to toxic sludge from the Pitt mutated her body and gave her durable metallic skin. Swensen is later recruited into the CIA and moves to New York. Now known as Chrome, Swensen becomes a sidekick to Captain Manhattan, who she falls in love with.
- Evan Heubner is a young orphan who ended up at the Clinic. Heubner possesses no powers, but is able to pilot Antibody's antibodies. Shadowman, Heubner's primary antibody, is killed saving him and Antibody from the Famileech.

== Alternate versions ==
As the Exiles are chasing Proteus, the team recruits D.P.7 to help them. In the following battle, Proteus takes over the body of Justice and fled their universe and the Exiles followed, leaving the team behind, but now aware of other paranormals.

== Parodies and references ==
- In Quasar #4, drawn by D.P.7 penciler/co-creator Paul Ryan, the title character encounters two joggers who resemble Stephanie Harrington and Charly Beck.
- The splash page of Avengers West Coast #65 (December 1990), also drawn by Paul Ryan, features Wonder Man in a graveyard among several D.P.7 members' gravestones.

== Collections ==
- D.P. 7 Classic Volume 1
  - Contains material originally published in magazine form as D.P. 7 #1–9. First printing: August 2007. ISBN 0-7851-2859-X.

== Creators ==
=== Writers ===
- Mark Gruenwald—D.P. 7 #1-32 (November 1986–June 1989); D.P. 7 Annual #1 (January 1987)

=== Art ===
- Paul Ryan—D.P. 7 #1–32 (November 1986–June 1989)
- Lee Weeks—D.P. 7 Annual #1 (January 1987)

=== Cover art ===
- Paul Ryan—D.P. 7 #1–32 (November 1986–June 1989)
