= The Pitt (comics) =

1987 one-shot comic book

- Cover to The Pitt one-shot, art by Michael Heisler.

Publication information
- Publisher: Marvel Comics as part of its New Universe line
- Format: One-shot (47 pages, no ads)
- Publication date: December 1987

Creative team
- Written by: John Byrne, Mark Gruenwald
- Penciller: Sal Buscema
- Inker: Stan Drake
- Colorist: Janet Jackson

The Pitt is a 1987 one-shot comic book written by John Byrne and Mark Gruenwald, and illustrated by Sal Buscema and Stan Drake. It was published by Marvel Comics as part of its New Universe line. The story depicts the total destruction of the city of Pittsburgh, Pennsylvania, and its immediate twelve-hour aftermath. The Pitt was the first graphic novel published for Marvel's New Universe series.

== Major characters ==
- Starbrand (Ken Connell) – a young aspiring superhero and native of Pittsburgh bearing a mysterious sigil granting him potentially infinite power. Though the instigator of the Pitt, his presence in the story is limited, appearing in only a few panels without dialog or being named.
- The Witness (Nelson Kohler) – a man who went into a coma precisely when the White Event occurred and subsequently died. His intellect reincorporating as a ghost-like psychic projection, he cannot be seen or heard, neither can he interact physically with the world in any way, but he can travel anywhere at will to observe events. He is compelled by a strange pull to witness people manifesting paranormal abilities.
- MacIntyre (Mac) Browning – Colonel in the Army's Defense Intelligence Agency called in to assess and handle the situation.
- Jenny Swensen (Spitfire) – government agent and operator of the M.A.X. Armor, which is used to investigate the scene and try to rescue survivors.

== Background ==
The storyline of The Pitt begins in issue #12 of Star Brand. In the previous issue, Ken Connell used his power to become the world's first costumed superhero. Now enjoying growing fame, he makes an appearance at a local Pittsburgh comic-book convention. A recurring enigmatic foe known only as the Old Man ambushes Connell at the show, destroying the building and killing hundreds of by-standers. After escaping, Connell realizes that he was able to read the Old Man's mind during the encounter, and thus learned that he is a centuries-old human bearing a brand like his own who was driven insane by it. Fearing the same thing may happen to him, Connell resolves to rid himself of the star brand immediately by flying to the far side of the Moon and dissipating as much of its energy as he can. However, as he begins the flight he has second thoughts about possibly being stranded so far from medical aid if anything should go wrong, and instead deems that ten miles (16 km) above the Earth is far enough. The issue ends with a splash page depiction of a massive ball of light erupting from Ken Connell.

== Synopsis ==
The destruction of Pittsburgh occurs at exactly 6:06 pm Eastern Standard Time on December 22, 1987. The spontaneous release of the Star Brand's energy instantly and silently annihilates all matter in a massive spherical volume, 50 miles in diameter, centered ten miles (16 km) above ground level. The sphere's intersection with the ground creates a perfectly symmetrical concave crater in the Earth's crust 15 miles (24 km) deep (exposing the hot mantle). The entirety of Pittsburgh, its immediate suburbs, and the nearly half a million people within cease to exist. As the atmosphere rushes into the sudden vacuum, creating violent winds several times greater than hurricane strength, thousands more are killed in neighboring areas.

The destruction of Pittsburgh (and the unsolved mystery of its cause) lead to a dramatic rise in international tension and a vast militarization of American society, including the suspension of some civil rights. Many cities suffer dramatic drop in population as residents fear becoming victims of another "Pitt". New York and surrounding areas in particular suffer severe economic downturn as, in addition to general depopulation, ash and smoke drifting Eastward from the Pitt have a negative environmental impact.

The Pitt led into the following mini-series The Draft and then The War, and ultimately the conclusion of the entire New Universe.
