= The Draft (comic book) =

Publication information
- Publisher: Marvel Comics under their New Universe imprint
- Format: One-shot (46 pages, no ads)
- Publication date: November 1988
- Main character: See main characters

Creative team
- Written by: Mark Gruenwald, Fabian Nicieza
- Penciller: Herb Trimpe
- Inker(s): Kyle Baker, Michael Gustovich, Klaus Janson, Lee Weeks, Keith Williams
- Colorist: Michael Higgins

The Draft is a comic book in Marvel's New Universe imprint, detailing the aftermath of the reintroduction of the draft following the destruction of Pittsburgh. The Draft was put into effect on January 28, 1988, and its unstated purpose was to establish a fighting force of soldiers with paranormal abilities. Paranormals were detected by a number of means, and were sent to a boot camp separate from non-paranormals.

== Major characters ==
- Lieutenant Keith Remsen (Nightmask): Possesses the ability to enter the dreams of others. His ability is used to evaluate the mental fitness of potential soldiers.
- Sergeant Haldeman: Possesses the ability to project extreme grief (which he calls Weltschmertz) into the minds of others. Haldeman is a drill sergeant.
- Christopher Barrett (Metallurgist): Has a 1949 Chevy hubcap that he can apparently control with his mind. He's able to use it to fly. Barrett turns 18 the day before the United States Congress approves the draft.
- Garth (Gridlock): Able to create tubes of force in geometric forms, Garth is 34 years old, and married with a daughter, but enlists out of a desire to take charge of his life.
- Harlan Mook (Blow Out): He has the ability to teleport, with the unusual twist that the space he leaves explodes. The greater the distance he teleports, the greater the explosion.

== Plot synopsis ==
The comic follows three draftees as they discover their abilities and decide to register for the Draft. Chris has a tense relationship with his father, who registers early in part as an act of rebellion. Garth feels like his wife and children don't respect him. Harlan's a student at the Massachusetts Institute of Technology but all his notes for his dissertation are destroyed when he teleports for the first time.

The three wind up at the paranormal boot camp and become friends of sorts, but Harlan has a lot of trouble fitting in due to his relative physical weakness and is picked on by another trainee with the nickname Pitt Bull. Lt. Remsen enters and analyzes Harlan's dreams as part of his mental evaluation, but, despite a lot of disturbing imagery, gives him a pass.

Two days later, after more harassment by Pitt Bull, Harlan attempts to kill him by teleporting away. Pitt Bull survives, and Harlan is put into solitary confinement as punishment, the stress of which finally breaks him.

The comic ends with Blowout teleporting into a live broadcast by President Reagan (although he is left unnamed) and then teleporting away, essentially making it an assassination attempt. The President survives in part because he is secretly also a paranormal.

Elements of The Draft were seen, sometimes from other perspectives, in other titles in the imprint.

== The Draft in the rest of the New Universe ==
The Draft focused mainly on new characters, but other titles, in particular DP 7 and Psi-Force had major characters impacted as they were drafted. Most of them eventually went AWOL, but a few stayed with the military. Also, The Draft and its successor, The War was an opportunity to use characters from cancelled New Universe titles.

The Draft also impacted the world in other ways, as other countries made a more concerted effort to create their own paranormal armies. Also, as the draft only applied to males, female paranormals were highly attractive to groups like the Central Intelligence Agency and offered very lucrative recruitment terms.

=== Existing New Universe characters who join the military ===
- Thomas Boyd (Psi-Force) (does not appear in The Draft)
- Tyrone Jessup (Psi-Force) (does not appear in The Draft)
- David Landers (Mastodon) (DP 7)
- Captain Jack Magniconte (Kickers, Inc.) (does not appear in The Draft)
- Randy O'Brien (Antibody) (DP 7)
- Gaylord Picaro (Pitt Bull) (DP 7)
- Jeff Walters (Blur) (DP 7)
- Major Zentner (DP 7)

== Creators ==
=== Writers ===
- Mark Gruenwald, Fabian Nicieza

=== Penciler ===
- Herb Trimpe

=== Cover art ===
- Paul Ryan
