= 1986 in comics =

Notable events of 1986 in comics.

== Events and publications ==
=== Year overall ===
- The Dark Knight Returns, a four-issue limited series written and drawn by Frank Miller and published by DC Comics, debuts. It reintroduces Batman to the general public as the psychologically dark character of his original 1930s conception, and helps to usher in an era of "grim and gritty" superheroes from the mid-1980s to the mid-1990s.
- Watchmen, a twelve-issue limited series written by Alan Moore, illustrated by Dave Gibbons and published by DC Comics, debuts. To date, Watchmen remains the only graphic novel to win a Hugo Award, and is also the only graphic novel to appear on Time's 2005 list of "the 100 best English-language novels from 1923 to the present."
- The first volume of Maus, written and drawn by Art Spiegelman debuts. Maus is a biography, presented in comics form, of Spiegelman's father, Vladek Spiegelman, a survivor of the Nazi Holocaust. Spiegelman was awarded a 1992 Pulitzer Prize Special Award for Maus shortly after its completion in 1991.
- A plethora of new independent publishers enter the comics arena, including ACE Comics, Adventure Publications, Apple Comics, Crystal Publications, Dark Horse Comics, Eternity Comics, Fantagor Press, Gladstone Comics, Malibu Comics, Pied Piper Comics, Silverwolf Comics, Slave Labor Graphics, Solson Publications, and Spotlight Comics. Conversely, Lodestone Comics and Sirius Comics/New Sirius Productions go out of business.
- The Man of Steel, a six-issue comic book limited series written and penciled by John Byrne, inked by Dick Giordano and published by DC Comics, debuts. The mini-series is designed to revamp the Superman mythos, using the history-altering effects of Crisis on Infinite Earths as an explanation for numerous changes to previous continuity.
- The "Born Again" story arc runs in Marvel Comics' Daredevil (issues #227 to #233), written by Frank Miller and drawn by David Mazzucchelli.
- The "Mutant Massacre" crossover storyline runs through Marvel Comics in the fall. It primarily involves the superhero teams the X-Men, X-Factor, and the New Mutants. Power Pack, Thor, and Daredevil cross over for an issue in their own titles.
- Captain Confederacy, created by Will Shetterly and Vince Stone, debuts, published by SteelDragon Press. It will run 12 issues.
- DC publishes Heroes Against Hunger starring Superman and Batman, an all-star benefit book for African famine relief and recovery.
- Marvel Super Special, with issue #41, about Howard the Duck, is cancelled by Marvel Comics.
- André Franquin and Jean-François Moyersoen establish Marsu Productions.

=== January ===
- January 20: The final episode of Marten Toonder's Tom Poes is published. Olivier B. Bommel marries Annemarie Doddeltje, while Tom Poes leaves and roams the Earth.
- With issue #323, DC cancels World's Finest Comics.

=== February ===
- The French publisher Delcourt enters the marketplace, cancelling the comics magazine Charlie Mensuel and merging its contents with Pilote magazine.
- With issue #329, DC cancels Wonder Woman.
- With issue #152, Marvel cancels The Defenders.
- With issue #75, Marvel cancels ROM.
- With issue #34, Marvel cancels Epic Illustrated.

=== March ===
- March 3: The first episode of Jim Davis' U.S. Acres is published. It will run until 1989.
- March 22: British comic magazine The Beano organizes a publicity stunt, where in the latest episode of Dennis the Menace and Gnasher Dennis' dog Gnasher suddenly disappears. Over the next two months, his absence is used to intrigue readers and make them wonder about the dog's whereabouts. The mystery receives remarkable media attention. On 5 May, Gnasher returns.
- March 22 - 13 April: The first annual comics festival of Knokke, Belgium (Stripfestival Knokke, nowadays Stripfestival Middelkerke), is organized.
- Wonder Man #1 one-shot, by David Michelinie, Kerry Gammill, and Vince Colletta; published by Marvel Comics.
- Broadside, a comic strip by Jeff Bacon, begins appearing in the Navy Times.

=== April ===
- April 1: In Tintin, the Ric Hochet story Les Messagers du Trepas, by André-Paul Duchâteau and Tibet, is serialized.
- April 16: A special benefit night is organized, in the presence of countless Belgian comic artists, to promote and receive funding for a comic museum devoted to Belgian comics. The action is successful and greenlighted from 24 April on, in 1989 resulting in the opening of the Belgian Comic Strip Center in Brussels.
- April 10: Metalzoic (DC Graphic Novel #6), by Pat Mills and Kevin O'Neill, published by DC Comics.
- The Enchanted Apples of Oz, First Graphic Novel #5, by Eric Shanower (First Comics).
- With issue #106, Archie Comics cancels Archie's TV Laugh-Out.
- With issue #71, DC Comics cancels The Best of DC
- Daniel Clowes's Lloyd Llewellyn makes its debut.

=== May ===
- Green Lantern #200: "Five Billion Years," by Steve Englehart, Joe Staton, and Bruce D. Patterson. (DC Comics)
- The Incredible Hulk #319: Bruce Banner marries Betty Ross. (Marvel Comics)
- With issue #20, Marvel cancels Micronauts: The New Voyages.

=== June ===
- June 7: The final episode of Bill Schorr's Conrad is published.
- With issue #201, DC changes the title of the Green Lantern comic book to The Green Lantern Corps.
- The Thing, with issue #36, is cancelled by Marvel.

=== July ===
- July 2: Dick Matena wins the Stripschapprijs. Hans van den Boom receives the P. Hans Frankfurtherprijs.
- Dark Horse Comics makes its debut as a publisher with the anthology Dark Horse Presents #1.
- Hawkman Special (DC Comics), by Jenny Blake Isabella, Richard Howell, and Ron Randall.
- With issue #107, Marvel cancels its Star Wars comic.

=== August ===
- Aristocratic Xtraterrestrial Time-Traveling Thieves "Micro Series" #1 (Comics Interview), by Henry Vogel and Mark Propst.

=== September ===
- Alan Moore, Dave Gibbons and John Higgins' Watchmen is first published.
- "Whatever Happened to the Man of Tomorrow?," a two-part Superman story, appears in Superman #423 and Action Comics #583. Written by Alan Moore, with art by Curt Swan, George Pérez, and Kurt Schaffenberger; published by DC Comics.
- DC suspends publication of Superman; in 1987 the title relaunches as The Adventures of Superman (continuing the numbering of Superman).
- DC suspends publication of Action Comics (until January 1987) to allow for the publication of John Byrne's The Man of Steel limited series and Byrne's revamp of the Superman character/franchise.
- With issue #97, DC cancels DC Comics Presents.
- Power Man and Iron Fist, with issue #125, is cancelled by Marvel.
- September 27: Warlord, with issue #627, is merged with Victor (D.C. Thomson).

=== October ===
- October 1: Jean Van Hamme and Grzegorz Rosinski's graphic novel Chninkel starts serialisation in the magazine À Suivre.
- October 4:
  - The final episode of Pat Mills and Joe Colquhoun's Charley's War is prepublished in Battle Picture Weekly.
  - The final The Adventures of Tintin album Tintin and the Alph-Art, which remained unfinished, is published in its sketched-out form.
- October 18: The Dutch comics store Lambiek in Amsterdam opens their art gallery. The first exhibition centers around the comics magazine RAW. In the following years the store will host several other exhibitions, inviting national and international comics artists over to exhibit their drawings and sign their work. It will make the store internationally famous in comics circles.
- Marvel Comics launches the New Universe, an imprint created in celebration of Marvel's 25th anniversary. Comics published by New Universe are in a distinctly separate world, fully divorced from the mainstream continuity of the Marvel Universe, consisting of its own continuing characters and stories in a more realistic setting. The New Universe's first titles are Spitfire and The Troubleshooters and Star Brand.
- Batman #400: 68-page anniversary issue, "Resurrection Night," by Doug Moench and an all-star roster of artists, including Bill Sienkiewicz, John Byrne, George Pérez, Art Adams, and Brian Bolland. (DC Comics)
- L’alba dei morti viventi (The living dead’s dawn) – by Tiziano Sclavi and Angelo Stano; first album of the Dylan Dog series (Bonelli). Beyond the hero, his two partners (Groucho and Inspector Bloch) and his nemesis (Xabaras) make their debut.

=== November ===
- November 1: The first episode of Gnasher and Gipper, starring Gnasher and his son Gipper, is published in The Beano, drawn by David Sutherland.
- November 3: Ralph Dunagin and Dana Summers' The Middletons makes its debut.
- November 29: In a gag of Jan, Jans en de Kinderen (Jack, Jacky and the Juniors) by Jan Kruis, the fictional holiday Sint Pannekoek (Saint Pancake's Day) is introduced. This joke will eventually become a real holiday celebration in some parts of The Netherlands.
- Hergé's widow, Fanny Rodwell, disestablishes Studio Hergé and replaces it a year later by the Hergé Foundation, aka Moulinsart.
- Marvel's New Universe imprint launches six more titles: D.P. 7, Justice, Kickers, Inc., Mark Hazzard: Merc, Nightmask, and Psi-Force.
- DC Comics begins publishing "Legends," a crossover storyline that runs through a six-issue, self-titled limited series and various other DC titles published (22 chapters in all) in 1986 and 1987.

=== December ===
- Blue Devil, with issue #31, is canceled by DC Comics
- With issue #15, Comico publishes the final issue of Matt Wagner's Mage: The Hero Discovered
- Amazing High Adventure, with issue #5, publishes its final issue. (Marvel Comics)
- Chester Brown's Yummy Fur begins professional publication by Vortex Comics

== Deaths ==
=== January ===
- January 6: George Sixta, American comics artist (Dick Draper, Foreign Correspondent, Rivets), dies at age 74.
- January 10: Marvin Bradley, American comics artist (Rex Morgan, M.D.), dies at age 72.
- January 11: Kazuo Kamimura, Japanese manga artist (Lady Snowblood), dies at age 45 from a pharynx tumor.
- January 15: Alfred Bestall, British comics artist (continued Rupert Bear), dies at age 93.
- January 23: Frank Grundeen, American animator and comics artist (continued the Donald Duck newspaper comic strip), dies at age 74.
- January 28: Allen Saunders, American journalist, writer and comics writer (Steve Roper and Mike Nomad, Mary Worth, Kerry Drake), dies at age 86.

=== February ===
- February 21: Derek Chittock, aka Droc, aka Lucian, British art critic, painter and cartoonist (Bennie, Barley Bottom), dies at age 64.
- February 22: Ernest Shaw, British comics artist (The Gay Goblins, Mr. and Mrs. Dillwater, Dr. Gnome of Gnomansland, The Dingbats), dies at age 95.

=== March ===
- March 4: Maurice Julhès, French illustrator and comics artist (Monsieur Lezognard), dies at age 89.
- March 6: Jack Binder, American comics artist, (Daredevil) and studio founder, dies at age 83.
- March 19: Stephen P. Dowling, British comics artist (Garth, Ruggles, Belinda, Keeping Up With The Joneses), dies at age 82.
- Specific date unknown: Unk White, Australian comics artist, illustrator and painter (Freckles), dies at age 85 or 86.

=== April ===
- April 2: Jack Manning, American comics artist and animator (Disney comics, Looney Tunes comics, Hanna-Barbera comics), dies at age 65.
- April 7: Don W. Moore, American comics writer (scripted Flash Gordon and Jungle Jim), dies at age 81.
- April 16: John Churchill Chase, American comics artist, editorial cartoonist and historian (Louisiana Purchase, We The People), dies at age 80 or 81.
- April 22: Dick Moores, American comics artist and animator (Jim Hardy, Scamp, worked on Dick Tracy, Disney comics, continued Gasoline Alley), dies at age 75.
- April: Stefano Tamburini, Italian comics writer (RanXerox), dies from a drug overdose at age 40 or 41.

=== May ===
- May 8: Klaus Schönefeld, Canadian comic artist (worked on Stig's Inferno and Mister X), dies at age 23 from heart failure.
- May 15: Virginia Krausmann, American comics artist (continued Annibelle, Marianne), dies at age 73.

=== June ===
- June 19: Coluche, French comedian (collaborated with Jean-Marc Reiser on the comic series Les Sales Blagues), dies at age 41 in a traffic accident.
- June 21: Gaston Martineau, aka Aldé, French journalist, writer and comics artist (Mistouflet), dies at age 61.
- June 23:
  - William Ferguson, American illustrator and comics artist (Feathered Facts and Fancies, Who's Who in Dogdom, Our Great Outdoor Zoo, Mother Nature's Curio Shop, Your Sunday Stroll, This Curious World, Righterong, This Curious World, Glen Forrest, Cateby, Beekins), dies at age 86.
  - Lex Metz, Dutch illustrator and comics artist (De Kabouterboekjes, Pukkel en de Blauwe Ogen van Jan Beilder), dies at age 73.
  - Bela Szepes, Hungarian swimmer, skier, journalist sculptor and comics artist, dies at age 82.

=== July ===
- July 22: Floyd Gottfredson, American comics artist (Mickey Mouse comics), dies at age 81.

=== August ===
- August 10: Marie Hjuler, Danish illustrator and comic artist (Lone og Lille Lasse), dies at age 91.

=== September ===
- September 4: Edd Ashe, American illustrator and comics artist (continued Don Winslow of the Navy), dies at age 78.

=== October ===
- October 4: Mike Butterworth, British comics writer (Wulf the Briton, The Trigan Empire, Storm), dies at age 62.
- October 10: Frank O'Neal, American comics artist (Short Ribs), dies at age 64.
- October 11: David Hand, American animator and film director (Walt Disney Company, Gaumont), dies at age 86.
- October 22: Bert Hill, British comics artist (Charlie Chuckle, Barnacle Ben, the Breezy Buccaneer, Freddie Freewheel the Tramp Cyclist, Sammy Spry, Frolics in the Far West, Tommy Trot the Tudor Tramp, Harry Coe, P.C. Copperclock the Desert Cop, Willie Scribble the Pavement Artist, Lil and Lena), dies at age 84.
- October 23: Marcel Moniquet, Belgian comic artist (Aviorix), dies at age 89.
- Specific date in October unknown: Tom Cooke, American illustrator and comic artist (worked on the Gene Autry celebrity comic and Mary Worth), dies at age 62 or 63.

=== November ===
- November 19: Klaus Nordling, Finnish-American comics artist (Thin Man), dies at age 86.
- November 23: Norman Maurer, American comics artist, animator, screenwriter, film producer and animated film producer (Mighty Mouse comics, celebrity comics about The Three Stooges), dies at age 60 from cancer.
- November 23: Frank Smith, American animator and comics artist (continued the Donald Duck newspaper comic, made Hanna-Barbera comics and a comic strip based on W.C. Fields), dies at age 78.
- November 24: Al Smith, American comics artist (continued Mutt and Jeff) and founder of Al Smith Feature Service, dies at age 84.
- November 27: Colin Dawkins, American comics writer (EC Comics), dies at age 64.

=== December ===
- December 6: August Lenox, American painter and comics artist (Walt Disney's True Life Adventure Comics), dies at age 77 or 78.
- December 10: Bernard Eerden, Dutch priest and comic artist (Avonturen Van Een Ashanti-Jongen), dies at age 80.
- December 19: Frank Sels, Belgian comics artist (Zilverpijl (aka Silbertpfeil), assisted Willy Vandersteen and Karel Verschuere), commits suicide at age 44.
- December 24:
  - Paul Frehm, American comics artist (continued Ripley's Believe It or Not!), dies at age 82.
  - Gardner Fox, American comic book writer (Justice League, Batman, Flash, Green Lantern), dies at age 75.

=== Specific date unknown ===
- Joaquin Blázquez, Spanish comics artist, painter and sculptor dies at age 39 or 40.
- Les Callan, Canadian cartoonist and comics artist (Monty and Johnny), dies at age 80 or 81.
- Leslie Caswell, British comic artist and illustrator (Better or Worse, also drew episodes of Keeping Up With The Joneses), dies at an unknown age.
- Joe Certa, American comics artist (Martian Manhunter, Zook, continued Joe Palooka), dies at age 66 or 67.
- Edgardo Dell'Acqua, Italian comics artist (Gim Toro), dies at age 63 or 64.
- Renaat Demoen, Belgian comics artist and illustrator (Zonneland), dies at age 71 or 72.
- Zvonimir Furtinger, Croatian comics writer (Herlock Sholmes), dies at age 83 or 84.
- Ed Kressy, American comics artist (comics based on The Lone Ranger), dies at age 84.
- Bernard Segal, American painter and comics artist (Honey and Hank aka Elsworth), dies at age 78 or 79.

== Exhibitions and shows ==
- July 15-November 16: "Jewish Themes / Contemporary American Artists II" (Jewish Museum, New York City) — original drawings and sketches from Art Spiegelman's Maus
- September 29–October 26: "Cartoons Then" (University Gallery of Fine Art, Hoyt L. Sherman Gallery, Ohio State University, Columbus, Ohio) — historic collections from the Art Wood Collection; part of the Festival of Cartoon Art
- October 1–October 31: "Side by Side" (Main Library Gallery, Public Library of Columbus and Franklin County, Columbus, Ohio) — original cartoons and film advertising materials from OSU's Library for Communication and Graphics Arts and the Ohio Historical Society; part of the Festival of Cartoon Art
- October 6—November 21: "Cartoons Now" (Main Library Skylight Exhibit Hall, Ohio State University, Columbus, Ohio) — work by members of the Association of American Editorial Cartoonists, Cartoonists Association, and the National Cartoonists Society; part of the Festival of Cartoon Art

== Conventions ==
- April 11–13: 2nd Annual Victoria International Cartoon Festival (Victoria, British Columbia, Canada)
- May 31–June 1: Birmingham Comic Art Show (Motorcycle Museum, NEC, Birmingham, England) — presentation of the Eagle Awards
- July 4–6: Chicago Comicon (Ramada O'Hare Hotel, Rosemont, Illinois) — 5,000 attendees; official guests: Stan Lee (guest of honor), George Pérez (special guest), Doug Wildey
- July 4–6: Dallas Fantasy Fair I (Dallas Marriott Park Central, Dallas, Texas) — guests include Dave Stevens, Gary Groth, Pat Broderick, Will Eisner, Mike Gustovich, Burne Hogarth, Gil Kane, Jack Kirby, Joe Kubert, William Messner-Loebs, Frank Miller, Jean Giraud, Doug Moench, Richard Pini, Dave Sim, Donald Simpson, Alex Toth, Doug Wildey, Neal Barrett, Jr., David A. Cherry, Carole Nelson Douglas, George R.R. Martin, Ardath Mayhar, Warren Norwood, Frederik Pohl, Kay Reynolds, Fred Saberhagen, Lewis Shiner, John Steakley, Howard Waldrop, Jack Williamson, Philip José Farmer, Roger Zelazny
- July 19–20: Creation Philadelphia (Centre Hotel, Philadelphia, Pennsylvania) — guests include John Romita, Jr. and Archie Goodwin
- July 31–August 3: San Diego Comic-Con (Convention and Performing Arts Center and Hotel San Diego, California) — 6,500 attendees; official guests: Poul Anderson, Marion Zimmer Bradley, Greg Evans, Stan Lee, Dale Messick, Frank Miller, Moebius, Mart Nodell, Harvey Pekar, Jim Valentino, and Doug Wildey
- August 2–4: Atlanta Fantasy Fair (Omni Hotel and Georgia World Congress Center, Atlanta, Georgia) — 5,000 attendees; comics guests include Chris Claremont, Denny O'Neil, Stan Lee, Ralph Bakshi, Matt Feazell, Kelly Freas, Dave Gibbons, Greg Hildebrandt, Jim Starlin, John Romita, Sr., Boris Vallejo, and Bob Burden; science fiction/fantasy writers include Robert Asprin, John Varley, Brad Strickland, and Diane Duane; media guests include Carl Macek, Don Kennedy, and Steve Jackson of Steve Jackson Games
- August 9–10: Creation Los Angeles (Hyatt Hotel, Los Angeles, California) — guests include John Romita, Jr. and Terry Austin
- August 9–10: King Kon (Dearborn Civic Center, Dearborn, Michigan) — guests include Ron Frenz, Al Milgrom, William Messner-Loebs, and Max Allan Collins; participating publishers include Marvel, DC, Arrow Comics, Stabur Graphics, and Vortex Comics; c. 2,500 attendees
- August 22–23: Comix Fair (Brookhollow Marriott, Houston, Texas) — guests include Gary Groth, Gil Kane, Joe Pumilia, Jeff Millar, Bill Hinds, and Doug Potter
- August 23–24: Creation Manhattan (Roosevelt Hotel, New York City) — special tribute to Marvel Comics' 25th anniversary; guests include Stan Lee and Jim Shooter
- August 23–24: Creation San Francisco (Holiday Inn Golden Gateway, San Francisco, California)
- September 6–7: Creation Washington, D.C. (Marriott Twin Bridges Hotel, Arlington, Virginia)
- September 20–21: Creation New Jersey (Hyatt Regency, New Brunswick, New Jersey)
- September 20–21: UKCAC (University of London Union, Malet Street, London, England) — guests include Bill Marks, Seth Motter, Dean Motter, David Lloyd, Frank Miller, Lynn Varley, Steve Leialoha, Lew Stringer, Glen Fabry, Gil Kane, John Bolton, Karen Berger, Alan Moore, Jenette Kahn, Dave Gibbons, Kevin O'Neill, Brett Ewins, Carl Potts, Alan Grant, Barry Windsor-Smith, Bryan Talbot, Bill Sienkiewicz, and Chris Claremont
- October 17–19: Festival of Cartoon Art (Ohio State University, Columbus, Ohio) — guest speakers include Brian Basset, Jim Davis, Jim Berry, Will Eisner, Selby Kelly, David Hendin, Dick Locher, Nicole Hollander, M.G. Lord, Roy Peterson, Doug Marlette, Sam Rawls, Arnold Schwartzman, Jerry Robinson, Morrie Turner, Michelle Urry, and Signe Wilkinson
- October 26–November 2: Salone Internazionale dei Comics (Palazzo dello Sport, Lucca, Italy) — 17th edition of the festival
- November 8–9: Mid-Ohio Con (Richland County Fairgrounds, Mansfield, Ohio) — guests of honor: Frank Miller, John Byrne, Stephen R. Bissette, John Totleben, and Bill Sienkiewicz
- November 14–16: Dallas Fantasy Fair II (Dallas Marriott Park Central, Dallas, Texas) — celebration of the 25th anniversary of Marvel Comics; guests include Stan Lee

== Awards ==
=== Eagle Awards ===
Presented in 1987 for comics published in 1986:

==== American Section ====
- Favourite Comic: Swamp Thing, written by Alan Moore (DC)
- Favourite New Title: Watchmen, written by Alan Moore (DC)
- Favourite Finite Series: Crisis on Infinite Earths, by Marv Wolfman and George Pérez (DC Comics)
- Favourite Graphic Novel: Batman: The Dark Knight Returns (DC)
- Favourite Single or Continued Story: Batman: The Dark Knight Returns (DC)
- Favourite Comic Cover: Batman: The Dark Knight Returns #1, by Frank Miller and Lynn Varley
- Favourite Group or Team: The X-Men
- Favourite Character: Batman
- Favourite Supporting Character: John Constantine, from Swamp Thing (DC)
- Favourite Character Worthy of Own Title: Wolverine
- Favourite Villain: The Joker
- Favourite Writer: Alan Moore
- Favourite Artist: Frank Miller
- Favourite Inker: Terry Austin
- Favourite Specialist Comics Publication: Amazing Heroes

==== UK Section ====
- Favourite Artist: Alan Davis
- Favourite Writer: Alan Moore
- Favourite Comic: 2000 AD (IPC)
- Favourite Comic Album: D.R. & Quinch's Totally Awesome Guide to Life, written by Alan Moore
- Favourite Character: Judge Dredd, from 2000 AD
- Favourite Villain: Torquemada, from 2000 AD
- Favourite Supporting Character: Ukko the Dwarf (from Sláine)
- Character Most Worthy of Own Title: Captain Britain
- Favourite Single or Continued Story: Halo Jones Three, written by Alan Moore
- Favourite New Title: Redfox (Harrier Comics)
- Favourite Comic Cover: 2000 AD #500
- Favourite Specialist Comics Publication: Speakeasy
- Roll of Honour:
  - Frank Miller
    - (nominated) Jerry Siegel
    - (nominated) Joe Shuster

=== Kirby Awards ===
- Best Single Issue: "Apocalypse," Daredevil #227, by Frank Miller and David Mazzucchelli (Marvel Comics)
- Best Continuing Series: Swamp Thing, by Alan Moore, Steve Bissette, and John Totleben (DC Comics)
- Best Black & White Series: Love and Rockets by Gilbert Hernandez and Jaime Hernandez (Fantagraphics)
- Best Finite Series: Crisis on Infinite Earths, by Marv Wolfman and George Pérez (DC)
- Best New Series: Miracleman, by Alan Moore and various artists (Eclipse Comics)
- Best Graphic Album: The Rocketeer, by Dave Stevens (Eclipse)
- Best Artist: Steve Rude, for Nexus (First Comics)
- Best Writer: Alan Moore, for Swamp Thing (DC)
- Best Writer/Artist (single or team): Frank Miller and David Mazzucchelli, for Daredevil (Marvel)
- Best Art Team: George Pérez and Jerry Ordway, for Crisis On Infinite Earths (DC)

== First issues by title ==
=== DC Comics ===
Angel Love

Release: August. Writer/Artist: Barbara Slate.

Blue Beetle

Release: June. Writer: Len Wein. Artists: Paris Cullins and Bruce Patterson.

Booster Gold

Release: February. Writer/Artist: Dan Jurgens.

Electric Warrior

Release: May. Writer: Doug Moench. Artist: Jim Baikie.

Hawkman

Release: August. Writer: Jenny Blake Isabella. Artists: Richard Howell and Don Heck.

'Mazing Man

Release: January. Writer: Bob Rozakis. Artist: Stephen DeStefano.

Secret Origins

Release: April. Editor: Roy Thomas.

Teen Titans Spotlight

Release: August. Writer: Marv Wolfman. Artists: Denys Cowan and Dick Giordano.

==== Limited series ====
Batman: The Dark Knight Returns (4 issues)

Release: February. Writer/Artist: Frank Miller.

Cosmic Boy (4 issues)

Release: December. Writer: Paul Levitz. Artists: Keith Giffen, Ernie Colón, and Bob Smith.

The Legend of Wonder Woman

Release: May. Writers: Trina Robbins and Kurt Busiek. Artist: Trina Robbins.

Legends (6 issues)

Release: November. Writers: John Ostrander and Len Wein. Artists: John Byrne and Karl Kesel.

Legionnaires 3

Release: February. Writers: Keith Giffen and Mindy Newell. Artist: Ernie Colón.

Lords of the Ultra-Realm

Release: June. Writer: Doug Moench. Artist: Pat Broderick.

The Man of Steel (6 issues)

Release: July. Writer/Artist: John Byrne.

Watchmen (12 issues)

Release: September. Writer: Alan Moore. Artist: Dave Gibbons.

=== Dupuis ===
Les Femmes en Blanc (32 volumes)

Artist: Philippe Bercovici. Writer: Raoul Cauvin.

=== Marvel Comics ===
Acorn Green

Release: October

Classic X-Men

Release: September. Editor: Ann Nocenti.

G.I. Joe Special Missions

Release: October. Writer: Larry Hama. Artist: Herb Trimpe.

Master of the Universe

Release: May by Star Comics. Writer: Mike Carlin. Artists: Ron Wilson and Dennis Janke.

The 'Nam

Release: December. Writer: Doug Murray. Artist: Michael Golden and Armando Gil.

Spider-Man and Zoids

Release: March by Marvel UK. Writer: Ian Rimmer. Artist: Kev Hopgood.

Strikeforce: Morituri

Release: December. Writer: Peter B. Gillis. Artist: Brent Anderson.

X-Factor

Release: February. Writer: Bob Layton. Artist: Jackson Guice.

==== New Universe ====
D.P. 7

Release: November. Writer: Mark Gruenwald. Artists: Paul Ryan and Romeo Tanghal.

Justice

Release: November. Writer: Archie Goodwin. Artists: Geof Isherwood, Joe DelBeato, and Jack Fury.

Kickers, Inc.

Release: November. Writer: Tom DeFalco. Artists: Ron Frenz and Sal Buscema.

Mark Hazzard: Merc

Release: November. Writer: Peter David. Artist: Gray Morrow.

Nightmask

Release: November. Writer: Archie Goodwin. Artists: Tony Salmons and Bret Blevins.

Psi-Force

Release: November. Writer: Steve Perry. Artists: Mark Texeira and Kyle Baker.

Spitfire and The Troubleshooters

Release: October. Writers: Eliot R. Brown, John Morelli, and Gerry Conway. Artists: Herb Trimpe, Joe Sinnott, and Tom Morgan.

Star Brand

Release: October. Writer: Jim Shooter. Artists: John Romita, Jr. and Al Williamson.

==== Limited series ====
Dakota North (5 issues)

Release: November. Writer: Martha Thomases. Artist: Tony Salmons.

Elektra: Assassin (8 issues)

Release: August by Epic Comics. Writer: Frank Miller. Artist: Bill Sienkiewicz.

The Punisher (5 issues)

Release: January. Writer: Steven Grant. Artists: Mike Zeck and John Beatty.

Steelgrip Starkey (6 issues)

Release: July by Epic Comics. Writer/Artist: Alan Weiss. Inker: James Sherman.

=== Independent titles ===
Dark Horse Presents

Release: July by Dark Horse Comics. Editor: Randy Stradley.

Dice Man

Release: by IPC Media. Editor: Pat Mills.

Dylan Dog

Release: October by Sergio Bonelli Editore. Writer: Tiziano Sclavi.

Dynamo Joe

Release: May by First Comics. Writer: John Ostrander. Artist: Doug Rice.

Elric: The Weird of the White Wolf

Release: October by First Comics. Writer: Roy Thomas. Artists: Michael T. Gilbert and George Freeman.

Hamster Vice

Release: June by Blackthorne Publishing. Writer/Artist: Dwayne Ferguson.

Jonny Quest

Release: June by Comico. Editor: Diana Schutz

Karmatron

Release: February by ¡Ka-Boom! Estudio. Writer/Artist: Oscar González Loyo.

night life

Release: by Strawberry Jam Comics. Writer: Derek McCulloch. Artist: Simon Tristam.

Omaha the Cat Dancer

Release: October by Kitchen Sink Press. Writer/Artist: Reed Waller.

The Puma Blues

Release: October by Aardvark One International. Writer: Stephen Murphy. Artist: Michael Zulli.

Reagan's Raiders

Release: October by Solson Publications: Writer: Monroe Arnold. Artists: Dick Ayers and Rich Buckler.

Samurai Penguin

Release: June by Slave Labor Graphics: Writer: Dan Vado. Artists: Dan Buck and Mark Buck.

Yummy Fur

Release: December by Vortex Comics. Cartoonist: Chester Brown

=== Limited series ===
Rip in Time

Release: by Fantagor Press. Writer: Bruce Jones. Artist: Richard Corben.

=== Akita Shoten ===
For Mrs.

=== Shueisha ===
Young You

== Initial appearances by character name ==
=== DC Comics ===
- Bad Samaritan, in The Outsiders #3 (January)
- Booster Gold, in Booster Gold #1 (February)
- Brimstone, in Legends #1 (November)
- Duke of Oil, in The Outsiders #6 (April)
- Film Freak, in Batman #395 (May)
- Hybrid, in New Teen Titans #24 (October)
- Carrie Kelley, in Batman: The Dark Knight Returns #1 (February)
- Kilowog, in Green Lantern Corps # 201 (June)
- Prometheus, in New Teen Titans #24 (October)
- Skeets, in Booster Gold #1 (February)
- Sodam Yat, in Tales of the Green Lantern Corps Annual #2 (December)
- Amanda Waller, in Legends #1 in (November)
- Vigilante (Dave Winston), in Vigilante #28 (April)
- Vic Sage in Blue Beetle #4 (September)
- Watchmen
  - Crimebusters, in Watchmen #2 (October)
    - The Comedian, in Watchmen #1 (September)
    - Doctor Manhattan, in Watchmen #1 (September)
    - Nite Owl (Dan Dreiberg), in Watchmen #1 (September)
    - Ozymandias, in Watchmen #1 (September)
    - Rorschach, in Watchmen #1 (September)
    - Silk Spectre (Laurie Juspeczyk), in Watchmen #1 (September)
  - Minutemen, in Watchmen #2 (October)
    - Captain Metropolis, in Watchmen #1 (September)
    - Dollar Bill, in Watchmen #2 (October)
    - Hooded Justice, in Watchmen #1 (September)
    - Mothman, in Watchmen #2 (October)
    - Nite Owl (Hollis Mason), in Watchmen #1 (September)
    - Silhouette, in Watchmen #2 (October)
    - Silk Spectre (Sally Juspeczyk), in Watchmen #1 (September)
    - Bubastis in Watchmen #1 (September)
    - Moloch the Mystic in Watchmen #2 (October)
- Magpie in The Man of Steel #3 (November)
- Michelle Carter in Booster Gold #6 (July)
- Ranx the Sentient City in Tales of the Green Lantern Corps Annual #2 (December)
- Icemaiden in Infinity Inc. #32 (November)
- Kelex in The Man of Steel #1 (October)
- Twister in New Teen Titans #26 (December)
- Captain Triumph in History of the DC Universe #1
- Owlwoman in Crisis on Infinite Earths #12 (March)

=== Marvel Comics ===
- Apocalypse, in X-Factor #5 (June)
- Berzerker, in X-Factor #11 (December)
- Eddie Brock, in Web of Spider-Man #18 (September)
- Chance, in Web of Spider-Man #15 (June)
- Rusty Collins, in X-Factor #1 (February)
- Dakota North, in Dakota North #1 (June)
- Foreigner, in Web of Spider-Man #15 (June)
- Cameron Hodge, in X-Factor #1 (February)
- Artie Maddicks, in X-Factor #2 (March)
- Marauders, in Uncanny X-Men #210 (October)
  - Arclight
  - Blockbuster
  - Harpoon
  - Riptide
  - Scalphunter
  - Scrambler
- Mayhem, in Cloak and Dagger Vol. 2 #5 (March)
- Nuke, in Daredevil #232 (May)
- Persuasion, in Alpha Flight #41 (December)
- Prism, in X-Factor #10 (November)
- Sinister Syndicate, in The Amazing Spider-Man #280 (September)
- Skids, in X-Factor #7 (August)
- Solo, in Web of Spider-Man #19 (October)
- Time Variance Authority, in Thor #372 (October)
- Tollbooth, in G.I. Joe: A Real American Hero #51 (September)
- U.S. Agent, in Captain America #323 (November)

=== Independent titles ===
- Concrete, in Dark Horse Presents #1 (July, Dark Horse)
- Shojun the Warlord, in 2000 AD #451 (IPC Media)
