= Broadsheet (disambiguation) =

Broadsheet is the largest of newspaper formats and is characterized by long vertical pages.

Broadsheet may also refer to:

- Broadsheet, an art journal published by the Contemporary Art Society in Adelaide, later Contemporary Art Centre of South Australia
- Broadsheet (magazine), former New Zealand feminist magazine
- Broadsheet (TV programme), a former Irish television current affairs programme
- Broadsheet (website), an Australian online city guide
- Broadsheet.ie, a former Irish website by John Ryan
- Broadsheet ballad, a single sheet of inexpensive paper printed on one side with a ballad

== See also ==
- Broad sheet glass, a type of hand-blown glass first made in Sussex in 1226
- Broadside (disambiguation)
