= Broadside =

Broadside or broadsides may refer to:

== Naval ==
- Broadside (naval), terminology for the side of a ship, the battery of cannon on one side of a warship, or their near simultaneous fire on naval warfare

== Printing and literature ==
- Broadside (comic strip), a weekly cartoon for United States Navy personnel
- Broadside (magazine), a folk music magazine
- Broadside (music), a poster with the lyrics to a folk song on it
- Broadside (newspaper), the student newspaper of George Mason University
- Broadside (printing), any large piece of paper printed on one side not folded
- Broadside ballad, a tabloid type of street literature popular from 1500 to 1850
- Dunlap broadside, a first printing of the United States Declaration of Independence
- Broadside, the student literary arts journal of Bradley University
- Broadsides: New Irish & English Songs, a 1937 poetry collection edited by W. B. Yeats and Dorothy Wellesley, Duchess of Wellington
- Broadside Books, an American imprint of HarperCollins

== Other uses ==
- Broadside (auto collision), a type of vehicle crash where the side of one or more vehicles is impacted.
- Broadside (album) a studio album by the 11-piece folk band Bellowhead, released 2012
- Broadside (band), a five-piece pop punk band from Richmond, Virginia, US
- Broadside (TV series), an American television series that aired during 1964–1965
- Broadsides (video game), a 1983 'Age of Sail' naval combat video game
- Adnams Broadside, a beer by Adnams Brewery
- Broadside (antenna engineering), a type of radiation pattern for a linear array antenna where the axis of the main lobe is perpendicular to the axis of the array.
