= Angel Love =

- Issue #1 of Angel Love.

Publication information
- Publisher: DC Comics
- Schedule: Monthly
- Format: Ongoing series
- Publication date: August 1986 - March 1987
- No. of issues: 8 and 1 special
- Main character(s): Angel Love

Creative team
- Created by: Barbara Slate

Angel Love is a comic book series created by Barbara Slate, published by DC Comics in the 1980s, as well as the lead character of this series. The first issue was dated August 1986. Despite its cartoony style, and some superficial stylistic resemblance to "girl humor" comic books of an earlier era such as Millie the Model, Patsy Walker, and Katy Keene, it was not intended as a children's comic; it covered "adult" issues such as drug use, pregnancy, and sexual abuse, and did not bear the Comics Code Authority seal. The 1987 Angel Love Special which wrapped up the series bore a "For Mature Readers" advisory on its cover. Nevertheless, its letter column sometimes featured letters from children.

Angel Love is a young woman who has moved from her native Scranton, Pennsylvania to New York City in hopes of finding a career as an artist. So far, however, the only career she has found is as a roller-skating waitress at a restaurant. Her adventures are portrayed sometimes with realism, but sometimes with fantasy elements such as talking cockroaches and a "guardian angel" she has drawn which comes to life to attempt to grant her wishes.

This comic book's unusual combination of style and subject matter made it difficult to market successfully. The "special" issue published soon afterward wrapped up the storyline, featuring Angel's attempt to convince her long-lost sister (now running for United States Congress and worrying about the political ramifications of revealing her long-suppressed family history) to supply her bone marrow to possibly save their mother from cancer.

Angel Love only made one appearance in the normal continuity of the DC Universe. She appeared in Animal Man #24, alongside almost every other character that did not exist in the proper continuity anymore, and was seen reading a copy of her own comic book.

== Collected editions ==
- DC Through the 80s: The Experiments collects Angel Love #1, 504 pages, May 2021, ISBN 978-1779507099
