= Legends (comics) =

Comic book crossover series by DC Comics

- Cover of Legends #1 (November 1986), art by John Byrne.
- Publisher: DC Comics
- Publication date: November 1986 – May 1987
- Genre: Superhero; Crossover
Title(s)
Action Comics #586
Adventures of Superman #426
Batman #401
Blue Beetle vol. 6 #9-10
Cosmic Boy #1-4
Detective Comics #568
The Fury of Firestorm #55-56
The Green Lantern Corps #207
Justice League of America #258-261
Legends #1-6
Secret Origins vol. 2 #10, 14
Superman vol. 2 #3
Warlord #114-115
- Main character(s): Justice League; Captain Marvel; Teen Titans; Suicide Squad; Darkseid

Creative team
- Writer(s): John Ostrander; Len Wein
- Penciller: John Byrne
- Inker: Karl Kesel
- Colorist: Tom Ziuko
- The Collection: ISBN 1-56389-095-X

"Legends" is a comic book crossover story line that ran through a six-issue, self-titled limited series and various other titles published by DC Comics in 1986 and 1987. Each of the individual crossover/tie-in issues had a Legends Chapter # header added to their trade dress.

The series was plotted by John Ostrander, scripted by Len Wein, pencilled by John Byrne, and inked by Karl Kesel.

== Publication history ==
The six issues of the Legends series could be read as an abbreviated story by themselves, or all 22 chapters could be read as a longer story that included the Legends issues as well as issues from other titles including Batman, Superman, and Secret Origins. It was also the first major DC Universe crossover after the events of Crisis on Infinite Earths.

Legends served mainly as a launching pad for several new comic series, including the latter-day Flash title, Keith Giffen and J. M. DeMatteis' comedy/action take on the Justice League, and the villain-based black ops Suicide Squad. The series also saw the post-Crisis introduction into the DC Universe of Captain Marvel (who was spun off in the miniseries Shazam!: The New Beginning) as well as Wonder Woman, who had been rebooted by DC Comics at the same time Legends was being published.

== Plot ==
Darkseid makes a wager with the mysterious Phantom Stranger that he can turn humanity against its heroes. To win the bet, Darkseid sends his minion Glorious Godfrey to Earth, where Godfrey uses the sound of his voice to control people's minds and turn them against Earth's heroes. To further his scheme, Darkseid sends a fire elemental called Brimstone to Earth to defeat the Detroit-based Justice League along with Firestorm and a time-traveling Cosmic Boy. Darkseid also arranges for the cyborg villain Macro-Man to be killed by the mystic lightning that Captain Marvel uses to change into Billy Batson, and Captain Marvel is blamed by the media for Macro-Man's death. Batman suffers his own loss when Robin (Jason Todd) is trampled by a mob. Fearing widespread panic, Ronald Reagan (commander-in-chief at the time of publication) declares martial law and bans all superheroic activities in America. This angers several members of Reagan's department of defense, who - at the behest of Amanda Waller - activate "Task Force X", a.k.a. the Suicide Squad. Recruiting a team of expendable imprisoned supervillains, Waller has the Suicide Squad destroy Brimstone.

Doctor Fate is forced to intervene when Godfrey invades Washington, DC. Fate organizes Superman, Batman, Wonder Woman, Captain Marvel, Guy Gardner, Black Canary, Changeling, The Flash, and the Blue Beetle to oppose Godfrey. They are joined by Martian Manhunter, who responds to a JLA distress call from the President. They manage to defeat Godfrey's forces, including Darkseid's cyborg Hounds of War. The masses are subsequently freed from Godfrey's power when Robin gathers an army of children untouched by his powers to serve as a human shield between the heroes and Godfrey. Godfrey strikes one of the children, and the shock frees the mob from his power. Godfrey is defeated when he steals Fate's helmet and puts it on, rendering him mindless. In the aftermath, Martian Manhunter, Batman, Blue Beetle, Guy Gardner, Black Canary, Captain Marvel and Fate form a new Justice League. Superman and the Flash decline membership, stating that they will assist if needed, Wonder Woman quietly exits and Changeling opts to remain with the Teen Titans.

== Story chronology ==
The official reading order was announced as follows by DC Comics:

- Chapter 1 Cross-over: Batman #401 (November 1986): "A Bird in the Hand..."
- Chapter 2 Cross-over: Detective Comics #568 (November 1986): "Eyrie"
- Legends #1 (November 1986): "Once Upon A Time...!"
- Chapter 3 Cross-over: Green Lantern Corps vol. 1 #207 (December 1986): "Simple Minds"
- Legends #2 (December 1986): "Breach of Faith!"
- Chapter 4 Spin-off: Cosmic Boy #1 (December 1986): "Those Who Will Not Learn the Lessons of History..."
- Chapter 5 Cross-over: Justice League of America #258 (January 1987): "The End of the Justice League of America: Saving Face"
- Chapter 6 Spin-off: Secret Origins vol. 2 #10 (January 1987): "The Phantom Stranger"
- Chapter 7 Cross-over: The Fury of Firestorm #55 (January 1987): "The Stench of Brimstone"
- Legends #3 (January 1987): "Send For... the Suicide Squad!"
- Chapter 8 Spin-off: Cosmic Boy #2 (January 1987): "Is History Destiny?"
- Chapter 9 Cross-over: Justice League of America #259 (February 1987): "The End of the Justice League of America: Homecoming"
- Chapter 10 Cross-over: Firestorm #56 (February 1987): "Firestorm No More"
- Chapter 11 Cross-over: Blue Beetle vol. 6 #9 (February 1987): "Timepiece!"
- Legends #4 (February 1987): "Cry Havoc...!"
- Chapter 12 Cross-over: Warlord vol. 1, #114 (February 1987): "When A Legend Dies"
- Chapter 13 Spin-off: Cosmic Boy #3 (February 1987): "Past, Present...and Future"
- Chapter 14 Cross-over: Justice League of America #260 (March 1987): "The End of the Justice League of America: Flesh"
- Chapter 15 Cross-over: Blue Beetle vol. 6 #10 (March 1987): "Time on His Hands"
- Chapter 16 Cross-over: Warlord vol. 1 #115 (March 1987): "The Citadel of Fear"
- Chapter 17 Cross-over: Superman vol. 2 #3 (March 1987): "Legends From the Darkside"
- Chapter 18 Cross-over: Adventures of Superman #426 (March 1987): "From the Dregs"
- Chapter 19 Cross-over: Action Comics #586 (March 1987): "The Champion!"
- Legends #5 (March 1987): "Let Slip the Dogs of War"
- Chapter 20 Spin-off: Cosmic Boy #4 (March 1987): "Time Without End"
- Chapter 21 Cross-over: Justice League of America #261 (April 1987): "The End of the Justice League of America: Last Stand"
- Legends #6 (April 1987): "Finale!"
- Chapter 22 Spin-off: Secret Origins vol. 2 #14 (May 1987): "The Secret Origin of the Suicide Squad"

== Collections ==
A trade paperback Legends: The Collection (ISBN 1-56389-095-X) was published in 1993 collecting the entire 6-issue limited series.

DC Comics published Legends 30th Anniversary Edition (ISBN 978-1401263164) in June 2016. It includes Legends #1-6. The crossover/tie-in issues are not included. This edition was made available for purchase in both print and digital formats.

All 6 issues are included in the Suicide Squad: Trial by Fire DC Finest edition (ISBN 978-1799500759).

The three Superman issues have been collected in Volume 2 of the Superman: The Man of Steel trade paperback series and Volume 1 of "Superman: The Man of Steel" hardcover collection.

The Batman issue was collected neither in the Batman: Second Chances trade paperback nor in Volume 1 of the Batman: The Caped Crusader trade paperback series, but has been collected in DC Finest - Batman: Years One and Two.

The Detective Comics issue has been collected in Volume 2 of the Greatest Batman Stories Ever Told (focusing on Catwoman and the Penguin) and Volume 1 of the Batman: The Dark Knight Detective trade paperback series and in the Batman: Years One and Two Volume of the DC Finest series.

The Green Lantern Corps issue has been collected in Volume 1 of Green Lantern Corps: Beware Their Power hardcover.

In 2026, DC announced the release of an omnibus edition of Legends containing all six issues of the crossover, all twenty-two tie-in issues, and issues #58-59 of Fury of Firestorm which acted as an epilogue.

== In other media ==
This storyline serves as inspiration for the Batman: The Brave and the Bold episode "Darkseid Descending!". The Justice League International in the episode consists of Batman, Martian Manhunter, Aquaman, Blue Beetle, Booster Gold, Guy Gardner, Fire, and Ice.
