= The New Wave (comics) =

American comic book series

- The cover to The New Wave #5, art by Paul Gulacy.

Publication information
- Publisher: Eclipse Comics
- Schedule: Bi-weekly #1-8; Monthly #9-14
- Format: Ongoing series
- Publication date: June 1986 – June 1987
- No. of issues: 13 (The New Wave); 2 (The New Wave vs. the Volunteers)
- Main character(s): Avalon; Dot; Impulse; Megabyte; Polestar; Tachyon

Creative team
- Created by: Dean Mullaney; Sean Deming; Cat Yronwoode; Mindy Newell
- Written by: Sean Deming #1-5; Mindy Newell #1-13
- Penciller(s): Lee Weeks #1-5, #7-12; Erik Larsen #6; Karl Waller #9; Eric Shanower #13
- Inker(s): Ty Templeton #1-10; Sam de La Rosa #11, #13; Lee Weeks #12
- Letterer(s): Lee Weeks #1; Carrie Spiegel #2-13
- Colorist(s): Ron Courtney #1-2, #4; Sam Parsons #3, #5-13
- Editor: Cat Yronwoode

The New Wave was a superhero team comic book published between 1986 and 1987 by Eclipse Comics.

== Publication history ==
The New Wave was intended to be the flagship title of Eclipse's mooted shared universe, in a change to their previous works rarely crossing over outside Mark Evanier's DNAgents and its spin-offs. The Heap, a Hillman Periodicals character from the supporting cast of Airboy, was to be the initial common linking factor. The New Wave was a committee creation - the loose storyline was taken from an unfinished work written by Eclipse publisher Dean Mullaney some years before; editorial assistant Sean Deming had created the characters of Dot and Tachyon as separate comic pitches and the rest of the characters came out of a brainstorming session between Mullaney, Deming and editor-in-chief Cat Yronwode. They then handed the results over to Mindy Newell for further development.

The team debuted in a preview included in the pages of two other Eclipse publications, The New DNAgents #9 and Miracleman #8, before The New Wave #1 debuted with a cover date of 10 June 1986. Along with Airboy, The New Wave attempted to make Eclipse's titles come closer in price to those of Marvel and DC. By reducing the page count to 16 (with 13 of story) a price of 50¢ was possible, compared to the 75¢ price of a typical major company 32-page title. The reduced page count also meant the creative team could produce the title on a bi-weekly schedule. Yronwode believed this had never been attempted by an American publisher with an ongoing title. The first print run of The New Wave #1 had to be withdrawn and destroyed when Yronwode found pages 2 and 7 had been switched. The initial art team included penciller Lee Weeks and inker Ty Templeton. Issue #6 featured fill-in artist Erik Larsen, some of his earliest published work.

The 50¢ experiment was not a success and ended after 8 issues. Both titles went back to full-length $1.25 books; however, where Airboy remained bi-weekly, The New Wave was put to monthly status, and initially issues consists of two 13-page stories in a single comic Issue #13 was drawn by Eric Shanower. The title still failed to catch on, and was cancelled after 13 issues. Following the cancellation of the regular book, The New Wave returned in a two-issue "micro-series" called The New Wave versus The Volunteers. The mini-series was rendered in 3-D, with a very limited number of copies of each issue produced in a non-3D format for the visually impaired.

The New Wave went on hiatus before resurfacing in Eclipse's 1988-1989 crossover Total Eclipse, with the company having high hopes it would revive interest in the characters. During the events of the story Tachyon was seemingly destroyed; however, a short 'interlude' written by Steve Gerber planned to set up a potential solo series for the character. However, neither Tachyon or the other New Wave members were seen again before Eclipse folded. Following the bankruptcy of Eclipse Comics, its properties were purchased by Todd McFarlane, including the rights to the New Wave characters. The supporting character Heap has been re-imagined as an antagonist to McFarlane's character, Spawn.

== Plot ==
Professor James Holmes works for the Corporation, a large and rich company based on a space station in Earth orbit. During an experiment he accidentally teleports the powerful alien Tachyon from his own dimension to the station. Holmes soon bonds with the alien and begins to realise the Corporation is far from benign, and is in fact planning to hold Earth to ransom. Tachyon flees to Earth to get help, but his first prospective allies - teenage superheroes Avalon and Impulse - are also captured by the Corporation, as is the stowaway Polestar. However, with aid from the industrial spy Dot, who had sneaked on board the station, and Megabyte, a robotic guard who changes sides, the group are able to escape and decide to band together to end the Corporation's plans of world domination. Avalon is revealed to be the daughter of Holmes, and later discovers that her mother is Lady of the Lake of Arthurian legend. Through Dot the group also meet The Volunteers, a group of superhumans.

== Characters ==
=== The New Wave ===
- Avalon: Elizabeth Lane, the teenage daughter James Holmes and Diana Lane (the superhero known as The Lady), Avalon is a powerful witch. She resents the hereditary powers she has received and attempts to hide them due to a fear she will be persecuted for having them.
- Dot - an experienced and occasionally cynical freelance spy with the power to shrink herself and, while small, fly and fire bio-electric blasts. While Dot is a mercenary she is also patriotic, and dislikes the threat the Corporation represents to the United States government.
- Impulse - Daniel Barkin, Avalon's neighbor and later lover. He is telekinetic, and unlike Elizabeth is eager to put his powers to use and become a superhero.
- Megabyte - a robot programmed with the brain patterns of a physically disabled teenage boy.
- Polestar - Morgan, a fame-hungry and somewhat promiscuous circus acrobat. Polestar carries a telescoping pole for hand-to-hand combat.
- Tachyon - blue-skinned, blue-haired extra-dimensional being with superhuman strength and the power of flight.

=== Others ===
- Professor James Holmes: Elizabeth's father, who drinks heavily since the death of his wife and struggles with the ethics of working for the Corporation.
- Nancy Dreiser: a colleague and some-time lover of Holmes.
- Cliff Pasternak: the sinister CEO of the Corporation.
- The Heap: formerly the pilot Baron Eric von Emmelman, transformed into a swamp monster after crashing in World War I Poland, and an occasionally ally of the New Wave.

== Reception ==
Reviewing the title for The Comics Journal, Heidi MacDonald lambasted the comic, noting the first four issues featured far too much bickering, uninteresting characters and unreadable page layouts. Re-reading the series some thirty years later, Lars Ingebrigtsen largely agreed.

Conversely writer Jay Faerber, who first discovered The New Wave after he began frequenting a comic book store called Gema Books as a high school freshman, has cited the book as a seminal influence on him and his writing, citing its experimental biweekly, 16-page format, its emphasis on character depth over physical combat, and the originality of the character's personalities and motivations.
