= Legionnaires 3 =

Limited comics series

Publication information
- Publisher: DC Comics
- Schedule: Monthly
- Format: Limited series
- Genre: Superhero
- Publication date: February – May 1986
- No. of issues: 4
- Main character(s): Lightning Lad; Saturn Girl; Cosmic Boy; Time Trapper

Creative team
- Written by: Keith Giffen; Mindy Newell
- Penciller: Ernie Colón
- Inker: Karl Kesel
- Editor: Karen Berger

Legionnaires 3 is a four-issue comic book limited series published by DC Comics in 1986, the second limited series to feature the Legion of Super-Heroes. (Note: The first Legion-related limited series was the three-part Secrets of the Legion of Super-Heroes (January–March 1981).) It was written by Keith Giffen and Mindy Newell, pencilled by Ernie Colón, and inked by Karl Kesel. The series pits the Legion's three founders against one of their deadliest enemies, the Time Trapper.

== Plot ==
In his citadel at the End of Time, the Time Trapper plays a game of chess with Brainiac. He interrupts the game to confront the Controller who once masqueraded as him and was captured by the Legion of Super-Heroes. (Note: The Legion captured the Controller, believing that he was the real Time Trapper, in All-New Collectors' Edition #C-55 (1978).) The Trapper previously saved the doppelganger from dying during the Crisis, (Note: The doppelganger was imprisoned on the planet Takron-Galtos, which was destroyed during Crisis on Infinite Earths.) only to now kill him. Obsessed with defeating the Legion, the Trapper observes the moment in time that gave birth to the team: the attempted assassination of billionaire R. J. Brande, which is foiled by Rokk Krinn (Cosmic Boy), Imra Ardeen (Saturn Girl), and Garth Ranzz (Lightning Lad). (Note: The attempt on Brande's life is first depicted in Superboy #147 (June 1968).) He decides that Lightning Lad is the group's weak link, and that the plan to destroy the Legion will focus upon him.

In Metropolis, the Legion's three founders, now retired from active duty, enjoy an evening at the Ranzz home when they are attacked by the Time Trapper's militia. While they successfully repel the soldiers (who are immediately killed by the Trapper), the heroes soon realize that the entire attack was a diversion which allowed one of the soldiers to kidnap Lightning Lad and Saturn Girl's baby son Graym Ranzz. In the child's place is a doll wrapped in a blanket containing a message: "Only four players in this game — any Legion interference and the child dies!"

Lightning Lad's twin sister Lightning Lass arrives for a visit, but he concocts a story to keep her away. Upon leaving to rendezvous with Cosmic Boy, he and Saturn Girl must avoid Colossal Boy and his wife Yera. Sneaking into the Time Institute, the three founders seek the aid of honorary Legionnaire Rond Vidar in obtaining a time-travelling device, without revealing anything about Graym's kidnapping. When Rond refuses, Saturn Girl uses her mental powers to render him unconscious. The three of them steal the Time Cube, disappearing into the timestream. Unexpectedly finding a gap in the Trapper's Iron Curtain of Time, (Note: The Time Trapper erected a barrier in the timestream to prevent the Legion from travelling into the future in Adventure Comics #317 (February 1964).) they arrive at the End of Time. They are soon captured by the Trapper's militia, with Lightning Lad imprisoned separately from Cosmic Boy and Saturn Girl. Cosmic Boy and Saturn Girl escape from their cell and journey through the Citadel, discovering that Graym is safe. They realize that Lightning Lad had been the Trapper's true target.

The Time Trapper subjects Lightning Lad to a variety of psychological attacks in an attempt to crush his spirit and sanity. After failing to break Lightning Lad, the Trapper reveals that he caused the shuttle accident that killed Lightning Lad's parents years earlier. Rather than destroying the Legionnaire, the revelation allows Lightning Lad to call upon an inner strength that he did not realize he had, vowing to make the Trapper pay for his parents' deaths. The three founders and baby Graym are all returned to the Ranzz home in 30th-century Metropolis. At the End of Time, the Trapper concedes momentary defeat, noting that "there will be other games".
