= Catwoman (comic book) =

American comic book series

- Cover of Catwoman #1; Art by Joe Brozowski and Michael Bair

Publication information
- Publisher: DC Comics
- Format: List: (vol. 1) Limited series (vol. 2-5) Ongoing series
- Genre: Superhero
- Publication date: List: (vol. 1) February – May 1989 (vol. 2) August 1993 – July 2001 (vol. 3) January 2002 – March 2010 (vol. 4) November 2011 – July 2016 (vol 5) September 2018 – present
- No. of issues: List: (vol. 1): 4 (vol. 2): 94 (vol. 3): 83 (vol. 4): 52 (plus one Special and two Annuals) (vol. 5): 67 as of September 2024 (plus four Special and two Annuals)
- Main character: Catwoman

Creative team
- Written by: List: (vol. 1): Mindy Newell (vol. 2): Jo Duffy Doug Moench Deborah Pomerantz Chuck Dixon Devin Grayson John Ostrander Bronwyn Carlton John Francis Moore (vol. 3): Ed Brubaker Will Pfieffer (vol. 4): Judd Winick Ann Nocenti Genevieve Valentine Frank Tieri (vol. 5): Joëlle Jones Ram V Tini Howard Torunn Grønbekk
- Artist: List: (vol. 1): Joe Brozowski (vol. 2): Jim Balent Staz Johnson (vol. 3): Darwyn Cooke Brad Rader Cameron Stewart Javier Pulido (vol. 4): Guillem March Adriana Melo Rafa Sandoval Patrick Zircher Mirko Colak Tano Alquiza Aaron Lopresti (vol. 5): Joëlle Jones Fernando Blanco David Gianfelice Nina Vakueva Emanuela Lupacchino Cian Tormey Laura Braga Liam Sharp Caspar Wijngaard Nina Vakueva Nico Leon Fabiana Mascolo
- Colorist: List: (vol. 1): Adrienne Roy (vol. 2): Adrienne Roy Pamela Rambo Noelle Giddings Gloria Vasquez (vol. 3): Matt Hollingsworth Paul Mounts Lee Loughridge Jeromy Cox June Chung (vol. 4): Tomeu Morey Blond (Rob Schwager) Jérôme K. Moore Sonia Oback David McCaig Gabe Eltaeb (vol. 5): Laura Allred John Kalisz FCO Plascencia Jordie Bellaire Jeremiah Skipper David Baron Antonia Fabela

Catwoman is an American comic book series featuring the DC Comics character Catwoman as its protagonist. The title was first released in 1989 as a limited series written by Mindy Newell. Newell expanded on Selina's past and origin as a former prostitute in Gotham City's East End region as established in Batman: Year One, and introduced her sister Maggie and her training with the superhero Wildcat. Catwoman was since published as an ongoing series starting in 1993 with its second volume, which featured Catwoman's international heists and adventures. With its third volume first published in 2002, writer Ed Brubaker redefined the character as the antihero protector of the East End, and artist Darwyn Cooke redesigned her previously flamboyant costume to be black and practical, which has since been the basis for her modern design.

2011's New 52 reboot deaged DC's characters and replaced their backstories with new ones; the series' fourth volume first written by Judd Winick was dark, violent, and focused on Catwoman's sex appeal, and was criticized for its sexual objectification. The fourth volume saw a steady drop in sales. Continuing from Batman Eternal's depiction of Catwoman being the daughter of a mob boss, Genevieve Valentine wrote her as the head of the Calabrese crime family. Valentine also established the character's bisexuality.

In the series' fifth volume first published in 2018, Joëlle Jones explored her journey after Catwoman and Batman's failed wedding in the Batman ongoing series. Following the DC Rebirth relaunch in 2016 that restored aspects of the previous DC continuity the New 52 erased, Jones restored the character's family to the Kyles: her sister Maggie, her alcoholic father, and her mother who died by suicide.

Catwoman has been nominated for the Eisner Awards for Brubaker's writing and Matt Hollingsworth's coloring, and won the GLAAD Media Award for Outstanding Comic Book for its depiction of a lesbian couple under Brubaker's pen.

== Publication history ==
=== Volume 1 (1989) ===
Because of satisfactory reception to Mindy Newell's 1988 Action Comics arc featuring Catwoman, "The Tin Roof Club", in February 1989, DC Comics released a four-issue Catwoman limited series penned by Newell, with art by Joe Brozowski and Michael Bair. A spin-off of Frank Miller's Batman: Year One, the miniseries expanded on Year One's scenes through Catwoman's perspective and explored Catwoman's established origin as well as her established past as a prostitute in Gotham City's East End as seen in Year One. The series also introduced Catwoman's Catholic nun sister, Magdalene (nicknamed Maggie), and her training with Justice Society of America member Wildcat/Ted Grant. While the series' editor teased to a fan of Newell's Action Comics arc the possibility of Newell writing a Catwoman monthly series given adequate sales, the audience for the comic was lacking and its last issue was Catwoman's last major appearance for years.

=== Volume 2 (1993–2001) ===
External image
- The cover artwork for Vol. 2's first issue, which introduced Catwoman's new purple costume, drawn by Jim Balent.

DC launched Catwoman's first ongoing series in 1993, originally written by Jo Duffy, pencilled by Jim Balent, and inked by Dick Giordano. Balent drew for the series for six years straight, with Bob Smith providing most of the series's inks, until its 77th issue, after which they were replaced by penciller Staz Johnson and inker Wayne Faucher. Other writers who took on the series include Doug Moench, Deborah Pomerantz, Chuck Dixon, Devin Grayson, John Ostrander, Bronwyn Carlton, and John Francis Moore. The series put the character on a new direction, moving away from grittiness towards flamboyance: her design was changed to consist of lengthy hair and a vibrant purple costume from her previous buzz cut and gray color palette established in Year One, and her stories consisted of action and extravagant heists in place of "grim realism". The series focused on Catwoman's adventures and heists, often international, with a revolving cast of characters, and also tied in to various comic crossover events, such as 1994's "Knightfall". In the series, Catwoman's Year One origin was minimized, with her time as a dominatrix only appearing on a short portion of a single page in the origin retelling Catwoman #0, and was altered in one of its annuals, showing Catwoman's former prostitution as a way for her to deceive and rob clients, and integrating a subplot involving martial arts with Catwoman tangling with a group of ninjas. The series also told her tragic backstory, with Catwoman's parents having died when she was a child, with her mother dying by suicide and her father from alcohol poisoning; Carlton in the series's 81st issue added to it, depicting her mother as a dark-skinned Latina, making Catwoman a half-Latina. In July 2001, the series ended in its 94th issue because the editorial team decided to cancel and relaunch the series for writer Ed Brubaker and artist Darwyn Cooke's different take on the character.

=== Volume 3 (2002–2010) ===
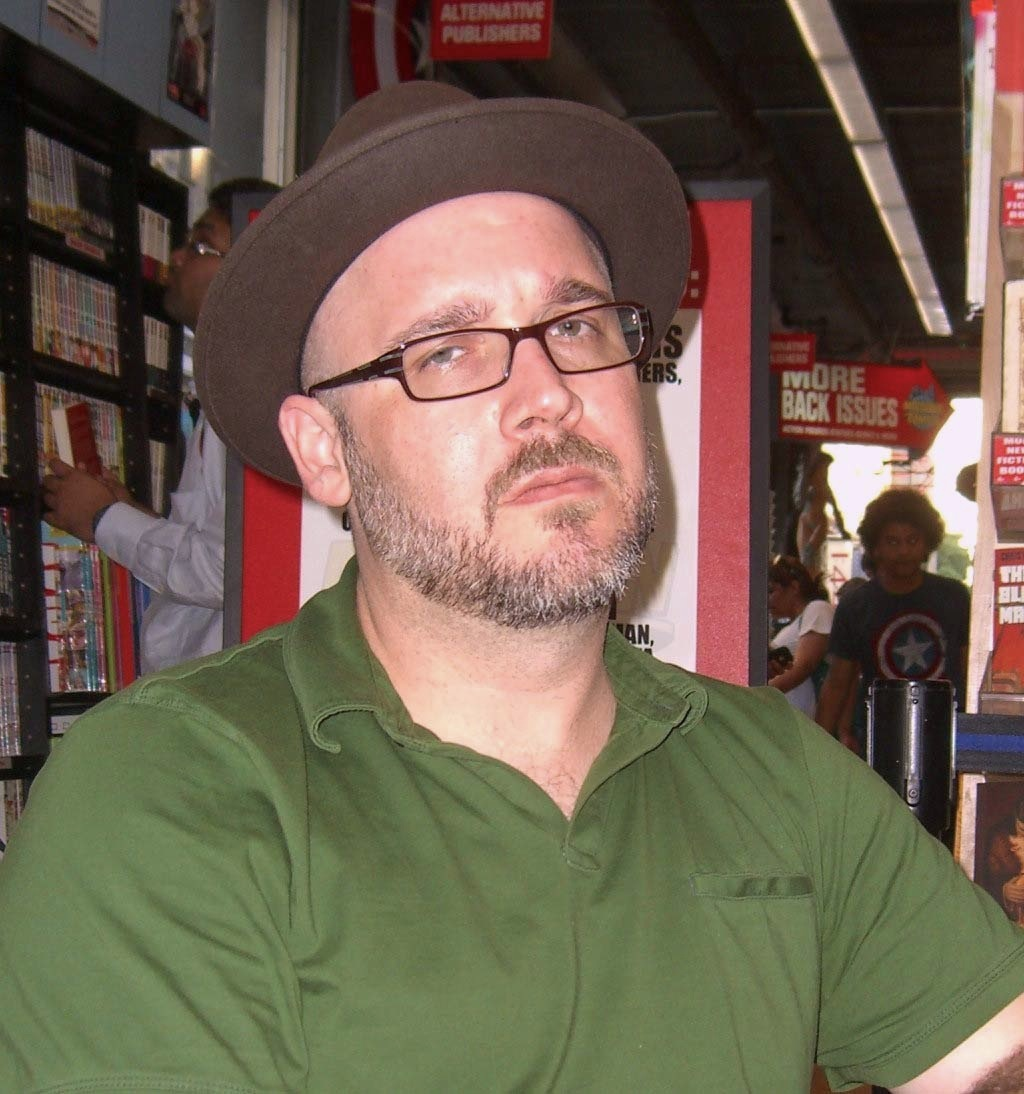
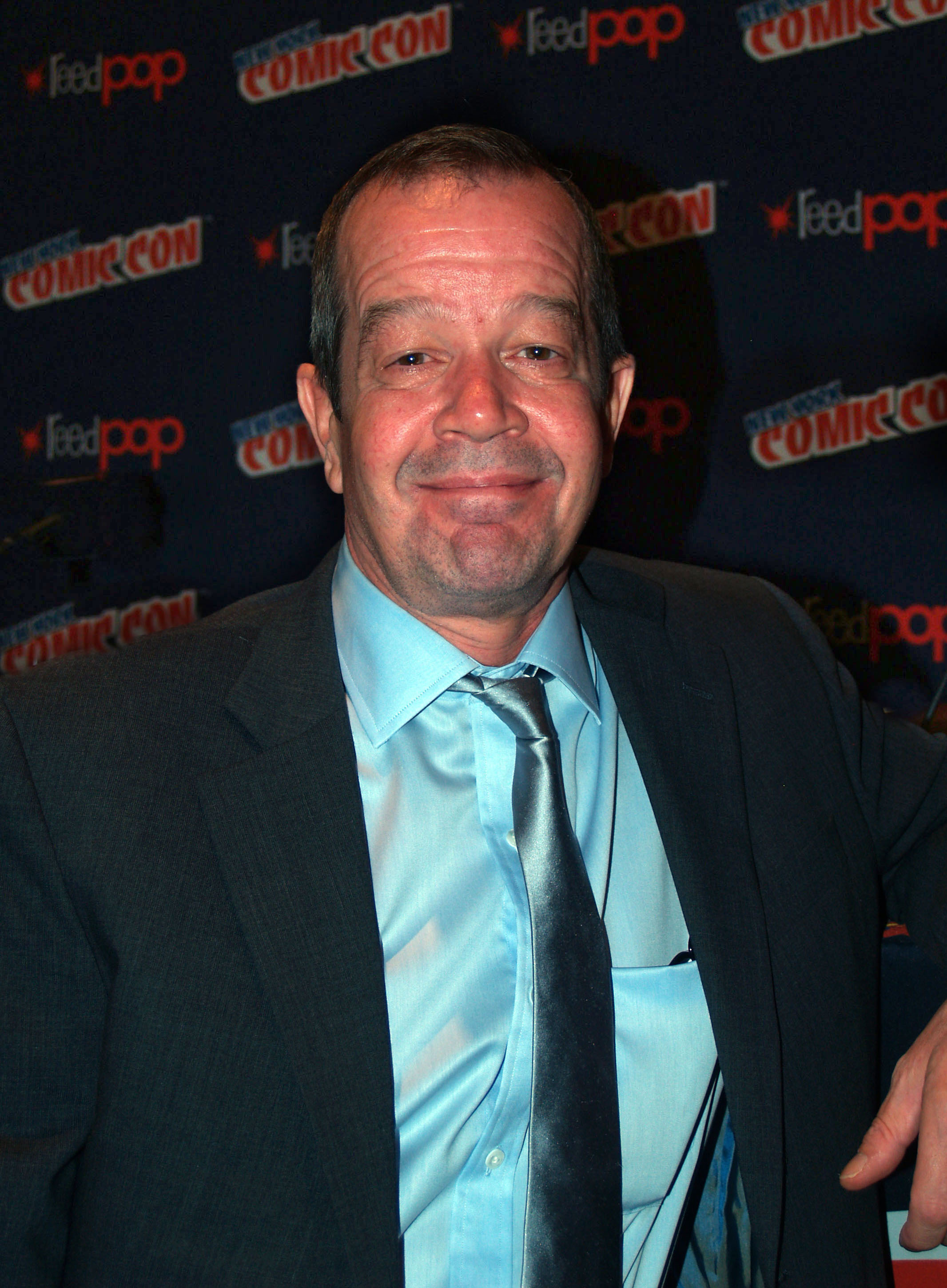
Ed Brubaker and Darwyn Cooke redefined the character in the series' third volume.

Brubaker was offered to write Catwoman by editor Matt Idelson after Idelson asked him for his opinion on the series at the time, which Brubaker thought was "kind of insulting to women readers" after having read advance copies of the comic which featured Catwoman in "naked shower fights", mentioning that he preferred Catwoman in the 1960s and 1970s comics as well as in Batman: Year One, and suggested to Idelson to take the character back to her "East End roots" while incorporating the "classiness of the high-society thief". Brubaker later accepted Idelson's offer to write the series, under the condition that they change Catwoman's design and artist, describing the previous artist as a "cheesecake artist". After searching for artists to draw the series, Brubaker sought Cooke after seeing advance copies of Cooke's art on Batman: Ego. Cooke agreed to draw the series, but mentioned that he would only draw for the first storyline given the short space in his schedule from a delay in Cooke's then-current project, DC: The New Frontier. Cooke's pencils on the start of their tenure on the series, initially Catwoman #95, impressed DC; DC decided to postpone its release for six months then relaunch it with Brubaker and Cooke's Catwoman, making the series' writer at the time rewrite their final issue with Catwoman's seeming death and having Brubaker and Cooke write a backup story for Detective Comics that would lead into the relaunched Catwoman comic. The backup centered on Slam Bradley, a private detective hired to investigate her death. In writing Catwoman, Brubaker considered the character's background and motivations of having been an orphaned child "raised in the system in the worst conditions" and "ended up on the streets", and thought of her compassion for "other people like her", "people who the system doesn't care about, the cops don't care about and who, really, Batman doesn't care about", establishing it as the foundation for the character's stories. In the book's first issue, Catwoman, having seen the police's disregard for the series of murders of prostitutes, declares, "I will speak for them. Because no one else will."

External image
- Darwyn Cooke's Catwoman/Selina Kyle design, with his notes.

Cooke's Catwoman redesign featured a black, practical catsuit with a cowl with tiny cat ears and aviation goggles resembling the eyes of a cat, and biker boots. Cooke also gave her a short haircut. This redesign has since been the longstanding foundation for her modern look.

Brubaker's Catwoman debuted in January 2002. It differed from the previous series, being a "character-driven crime noir comic" with interconnected story arcs, a permanent supporting cast, and a fixed setting, as well as Catwoman being an antihero, becoming the resident protector of the East End borough. Catwoman's supporting cast consisted of Holly Robinson (Catwoman's teenage friend from Batman: Year One that Brubaker reintroduced as Catwoman's street informant), Slam Bradley, and Leslie Thompkins (a volunteer doctor and ally of Batman who works in low-income neighborhoods), with Batman being a regular guest character. Maggie also returned in the series. After Cooke, other artists pencilled the series such as Brad Rader, Cameron Stewart, and Javier Pulido. Matt Hollingsworth colored the series. In 2002, the series won its creators the GLAAD Media Award for Outstanding Comic Book for its depiction of a lesbian couple, Holly and her girlfriend, Karon. In 2003, Brubaker and Hollingsworth were nominated for the Eisner Awards for Best Writer and Best Coloring, respectively, for their work on the series. Brubaker's Catwoman ended in January 2005 on its 37th issue. Brubaker planned for Catwoman to die pregnant with a child whose father is unknown as a culmination of a storyline of her taking over the East End, with Holly taking over the Catwoman role; however, DC disapproved of Catwoman's pregnancy being with an unknown father, and with Brubaker having set up the storyline throughout the series and not wanting to "just go back to the drawing board", Brubaker decided to quit writing the series.

"Then a couple years later, I'm over at Marvel, and DC does "One Year Later" and what is happening in Catwoman? Well, Holly's the new Catwoman and Selina's got a baby, and no one knows who the dad is. [Laughs] It turns out that Slam's son -- Slam Jr? -- is the father. I didn't even know Slam had a son, so... that was weird. I would not have had her sleep with both a father and his son, personally. [Laughs]".

— Ed Brubaker, 2014

"I like to play off that. To me, she's just someone who's had a really rough life, but she's never been beaten. She really comes out on top, and she uses her experiences and moves on from them — and she has fun while she's doing it, I think.".

— Will Pfeifer on writing Catwoman, 2008

Three writers succeeded Brubaker for six months in writing Catwoman, until Will Pfeifer became the main writer of the book, teaming up with artists David and Álvaro López. In DC's "One Year Later" initiative in which every DC comic series jumped ahead in-story by one year, Pfeifer wrote the character as a single mother who had adopted the alias Irena Dubrovna (a reference to the 1942 film Cat People), retired from her vigilantism, and moved out of the East End to Downtown Gotham, to prioritize the safety of her daughter, while still wearing the costume occasionally. The identity of the father was a mystery resolved in a flashback issue that revealed the events of the gap year. Meanwhile, Holly replaced Selina as Catwoman in the East End. Catwoman was cancelled in 2008 with its 82nd issue due to low sales. In 2010, DC briefly resurrected the series through an 83rd issue written by Tony Bedard that served as a tie-in to the "Blackest Night" crossover storyline.

=== Volume 4 (2011–2016) ===
"We're kind of taking her back to the core of what Catwoman is. I think if you grabbed 100 people on the street and asked them about Catwoman, they would probably have the gist of who she is. It's like, “Yeah, she dresses up like a cat, she's a cat burglar, she steals things, and she's really crazy sexy.”

— Judd Winick, 2011

In September 2011, DC rebooted their comic book line with The New 52, debuting 52 new series, including Catwoman. The "Flashpoint" crossover storyline concluded with the speedster superhero Flash creating a new universe wherein every character was deaged, had slightly different costumes, and new backstories, and thus Catwoman's history prior to the reboot was erased, and the new Catwoman comic featured a new cast of characters. Writer Judd Winick and artist Guillem March were the first creators to work on the series. Winick chose to write the Catwoman title, having wanted to write her as one of his favorite characters and not having written her before. According to Winick, he was given the "permission/marching orders" to create a "dark and sexy book"; he described it as a "tough, sexy, violent, somewhat over-the-top book, which is everything Catwoman should be", and as a "very sexy title", with his approach to writing the book emphasizing Catwoman's sex appeal. The first issue received negative reviews criticizing the blatant sexual objectification. Greg McElhatton of Comic Book Resources rated the issue one star, describing it as more of a "soft core skin flick" than a superhero comic, while Erik Norris of IGN rated it as "Awful". The A.V. Club's Oliver Sava stated that the issue consisted of "gratuitous images" accompanied by "cliché narration about risk and painfully stupid dialogue", while Keith Phipps described it as fitting much sex and violence into the "barest outline of a plot."

External images
- Catwoman (vol. 4) #0's controversial cover, featuring the titular character's contorted pose, drawn by March.
- A parody of March's cover by Kate Beaton.

In June 2012, DC announced #0 prequel issues for its series to celebrate the first anniversary of the New 52 to be released in September of the same year. Catwoman #0's cover artwork drawn by March, which featured Catwoman with a contorted body, having "bizarrely positioned limbs" with a "poorly defined connection to her torso" to showcase her face, breasts, and buttocks at the same time, was widely criticized. Several artists and cartoonists parodied the cover. DC released the issue with a redrawn, toned down cover.

Winick's run on the series was dark with violent action, vicious villains and an untrustworthy supporting cast. Sales dropped steadily, from 57,216 for the first issue to 34,117 for Catwoman #12, Winick and March's final issue. Ann Nocenti replaced Winick, and was joined by artists Rafa Sandoval, Jordi Tarragona, and Patrick Olliffe. Nocenti had not read any Catwoman comics at the time, instead preferring to do her own take at first. Nocenti's run started on issue 0, Catwoman's New 52 origin story that combines aspects of past stories into one, centering on her past as a traumatized orphan and referencing her origin in Tim Burton's 1992 film Batman Returns where she is "pushed off a building and licked back to life by a bunch of cats". Nocenti's arcs placed Catwoman in different directions, such as fighting a demon, exploring secret cities beneath Gotham City, crime fighting in a utopian Gotham while she was trapped in a "mass delusion", and joining a competition to determine the world's greatest thief. Readership continued to decline, with Nocenti's first storyline selling 35,200 copies, dropping to 18,945 by the end of her run.

"When they called me, they said that her being a mob boss would be at least the first arc, coming out of Batman Eternal. I think putting her in that position is so amazing. She is an amazing thief and everything else, but it's hard to keep her connected to Gotham when she's such an independent character. But putting her in something that is so much a part of the Gotham underworld — and then making it her responsibility? She doesn't like being in charge, but when she wants to be, she's damn good at it. And I think that that's the kind of tension that can easily sustain the entire arc.”

— Genevieve Valentine, 2015

Writer Genevieve Valentine and artist Garry Brown succeeded Nocenti and the former artists of the series. Valentine changed the direction of the series to a crime thriller, putting Selina into "the world of Gotham's organized crime families in the middle of a mafia war." The limited series Batman Eternal, which preceded her run, established Selina as the daughter of imprisoned crime boss Rex "the Lion" Calabrese.

Valentine wrote Selina becoming the head of the Calabreses to unite the mafia and prevent Gotham from tearing apart, an exploration of "powerful women in traditionally male spaces". To emphasize the theme, each issue featured a quote from famous historical women, such as Queen Elizabeth I and Lucrezia Borgia. Powerful women were also prominent in the cast, such as her cousin and second-in-command Antonia, and initial rival Eiko Hasigawa, who is the heir to Gotham's Yakuza. In February 2015, Valentine established Catwoman as bisexual in the series' 39th issue, after it depicted Selina kissing Eiko. David Messina drew the last few issues of Valentine's run, which ended with Selina stepping down as the head of the Calabreses and leaving Gotham. Writer Frank Tieri and artist Inaki Miranda took over the series, starting with the 47th issue which centered on Catwoman's caper in New York City. DC cancelled the book on its 52nd issue because of declining sales.

=== Volume 5 (2018–present) ===
In 2018, Catwoman was relaunched, with the first issues written by Joëlle Jones and illustrated by Jones herself as well as Fernando Blanco, Geraldo Borges, Inaki Miranda, and Aneke Murillenem. Jones' run followed from Catwoman leaving Batman at the altar during their wedding in Batman (vol. 3) #50, and centered on Catwoman leaving Gotham to a city based on Los Angeles "rebuilding and sort of reframing who she is after such a big event happened to her.” However, Jones originally pitched Catwoman before the wedding event took place.

External image
- Jones' redesign for Catwoman.

Jones redesigned Catwoman's costume, giving her a modern silhouette with exposed parts for "character movement and motion", inspired by a Helmut Lang dress and homaging her costume in Batman Returns and Batman: The Animated Series.

2016's DC Rebirth relaunch restored aspects of the former DC Universe the New 52 erased. In Jones' fourth issue, she reintroduced Catwoman's sister Maggie Kyle, and reverted Catwoman's family to the iteration before the New 52, to that of her alcoholic father Brian Kyle and her mother Maria who died by suicide. Jones' run concluded in its 21st issue. Subsequent writers consist of Ram V, Tini Howard, and Torunn Grønbekk.

== Collected editions ==
Title	Material collected	Pages	Publication date	ISBN
Volume 1 (1989)
Catwoman: Her Sister's Keeper	Catwoman vol. 1 #1-4	108	July 1991	978-0930289973
Volume 2 (1993–2001)
Catwoman: The Catfile	Catwoman vol. 2 #15-19	132	March 1996	978-1563892622
Catwoman by Jim Balent Book One	Catwoman vol. 2 #1-13	328	2017	978-1-4012-7363-7
Catwoman by Jim Balent Book Two	Catwoman vol. 2 #0, #14-24, Annual #2, and Showcase '95 #4	360	March 2019	978-1-4012-8820-4
Volume 3 (2002–2010)
Catwoman: The Dark End of the Street	Detective Comics vol. 1 #759-762 and Catwoman vol. 3 #1-4	134	2002	9781563899089
Catwoman: Crooked Little Town	Catwoman vol. 3 #5-10 and "The Many Lives of Selina Kyle", "The McSweeney Case" and "Why Holly Isn't Dead" from Catwoman Secret Files and Origins #1	167	2003	9781401200084
Catwoman: Relentless	Catwoman vol. 3 #12-19 and "Proper Planning" from Catwoman Secret Files and Origins #1	188	2004	9781401202187
Catwoman: Wild Ride	Catwoman vol. 3 #20-24	128	2005	9781845761905
Catwoman: The Replacements	Catwoman vol. 3 #53-58	135	2007	9781401212131
Catwoman: It's Only A Movie	Catwoman vol. 3 #59-65	158	2007	9781401213374
Catwoman: Catwoman Dies	Catwoman vol. 3 #66-72	156	2008	9781401216436
Catwoman: Crime Pays	Catwoman vol. 3 #73-77	123	2008	9780329683184
Catwoman: The Long Road Home	Catwoman vol. 3 #78-82	123	2009	9780329647124
Catwoman Vol. 1: Trail of the Catwoman	Catwoman: Selina's Big Score, Detective Comics #759-762, and Catwoman vol. 3 #1-9	336	2011	9781401233846
Catwoman Vol. 2: No Easy Way Down	Catwoman vol. 3 #10-24 and Catwoman Secret Files #1	400	2013	
Catwoman Vol. 3: Under Pressure	Catwoman vol. 3 #25-37	312	2014	9781401245924
Catwoman Vol. 4: The One You Love	Catwoman vol. 3 #38-49	240	2015	9781401258320
Catwoman Vol. 5: Backward Masking	Catwoman vol. 3 #50-65	232	2016	9781401260736
Catwoman Vol. 6: Final Jeopardy	Catwoman vol. 3 #66-83	424	2017	9781401265588
Catwoman of East End Omnibus	Detective Comics #759-762, Catwoman vol. 3 #1-37, Catwoman Secret Files #1, and Catwoman: Selina's Big Score #1	1064	June 21, 2022	9781779515032
Volume 4 (2011–2016)
Catwoman Vol. 1: The Game	Catwoman vol. 4 #1-6	138	2012	9781401234645
Catwoman Vol. 2: Dollhouse	Catwoman Vol. 4 #7-12	144	2013	9781401238391
Catwoman Vol. 3: Death of the Family	Catwoman Vol. 4 #13-18, story from Young Romance #1	176	2013	9781401242725
Catwoman Vol. 4: Gotham Underground	Catwoman Vol. 4 #19-24, 26, Annual #1 and Batman: The Dark Knight #23.4: Joker's Daughter	208	2014	9781401246273
Catwoman Vol. 5: Race of Thieves	Catwoman Vol. 4 #25, 27–34	232	2014	9781401250638
Catwoman Vol. 6: Keeper of the Castle	Catwoman Vol. 4 #35-40 and Annual #2	192	2015	9781401254698
Catwoman Vol. 7: Inheritance	Catwoman Vol. 4 #41-46 and DC Sneak Peek: Catwoman #1	152	2016	9781401261184
Catwoman Vol. 8: Run Like Hell	Catwoman Vol. 4 #47-52	144	2016	9781401264864
Volume 5 (2018-)
Catwoman Vol. 1: Copycats	Catwoman vol. 5 #1-6	160	2019	9781401288891
Catwoman Vol. 2: Far from Gotham	Catwoman vol. 5 #7-13 and Annual #1	216	2019	9781401294779
Catwoman Vol. 3: Friend or Foe?	Catwoman vol. 5 #16-21	152	2020	9781401299767
Catwoman Vol. 4: Come Home, Alley Cat	Catwoman vol. 5 #14-15, 22–28	248	2021	9781779504517
Catwoman Vol. 5: Valley of the Shadow of Death	Catwoman vol. 5 #29-32 and Catwoman 2021 Annual	136	2021	9781779512635
Catwoman Vol. 6: Fear State	Catwoman vol. 5 #34-38	128	2022	9781779515292
Catwoman Vol. 1: Dangerous Liaisons	Catwoman vol. 5 #39-44	158	2022	9781779517289
Catwoman Vol. 2: Cat International	Catwoman vol. 5 #45-50	176	2023	9781779520326
Catwoman Vol. 3: Duchess of Gotham	Catwoman vol. 5 #51-56	168	2023	9781779523327
Batman/Catwoman: The Gotham War	Batman/Catwoman: The Gotham War: Battle Lines, Batman #137-138, Catwoman vol. 5 #57-58 and Batman/Catwoman: The Gotham War: Scorched Earth	272	2024	9781779525987
Catwoman Vol. 4: Nine Lives	Catwoman Vol. 5 #59-68	248	2024	9781779525000
Catwoman Vol. 1: Who is Selina Kyle?	Catwoman Vol. 5 69–74	160	July 2025	978-1799501084
Catwoman Vol. 2: Never Let Them Smell Blood	Catwoman Vol. 5 75–78	112	January 2026	978-1799502869
Catwoman Vol. 3: Court of Fools	Catwoman Vol. 5 79–84	152	August 2026	978-1799508984

DC has also released a paperback in their Compact Comics line collecting the same issues and having the same subtitle as Catwoman Vol. 1: Trail of the Catwoman.

=== DC Finest ===
Title	Material collected	Pages	Publication date	ISBN
DC Finest: Catwoman: Life Lines	Catwoman stories from Action Comics #611–614; Catwoman (vol. 1) #1–4, (vol. 2) #1–12, Annual #1; Batman: Catwoman Defiant #1; Showcase '93 #1–4	600	2024	978-1779525000
DC Finest: Catwoman: Vengeance and Vindication	Catwoman (vol. 2) #0, 13–32, Annual #2; Batman: Shadow of the Bat #43–44; A story from Showcase '95 #4	624	2025	978-1799501756
DC Finest: Catwoman: Creatures of the Night	Catwoman (vol. 2) #33-53, Annual #3-4; A story from DC Universe Holiday Bash #1; A story from Catwoman Plus #1	648	2026	978-1799509813

== See also ==
- Batman (comic book)
- Harley Quinn (comic book)
- Poison Ivy (2022 comic book)
- Wonder Woman (comic book)

== Sources ==
- Hanley, Tim (July 1, 2017). Many Lives of Catwoman: The Felonious History of a Feline Fatale. Chicago, IL: Chicago Review Press. ISBN 978-1-61373-845-0.
- Wilber, Steven (July 2019). "Catwoman and Religion Through the Eyes of Mindy Newell". Back Issue!. TwoMorrows Publishing.
- Greenberger, Robert; Manning, Matthew K. (2009). The Batman Vault: A Museum-in-a-Book with Rare Collectibles from the Batcave. United States: Running Press Book Publishers. ISBN 978-0-7624-3663-7.
