= Mindy Newell =

American comic book writer and editor (born 1953)

- Born: October 24, 1953 (age 73)
- Areas: Writer, Editor
- Notable works: Catwoman, Lois Lane, Wonder Woman, Jenesis, Night Mare

Mindy Newell (born October 24, 1953) is an American comic book writer and editor, best known for her work with DC Comics.

== Early life ==
Born in Brooklyn, New York, Newell graduated from high school in 1971. She then attended the Beth Israel Deaconess Medical Center to study nursing. Following her nursing schooling, Newell enrolled at Quinnipiac University and studied biology while working as a nurse.

== Biography ==
A longtime fan of comics, particularly of Marvel's Spider-Man, Mindy Newell sent submissions to DC Comics in 1983 at a time when the company was actively looking for new talent. Her first professional work was her creation of the character Jenesis, which appeared in three issues of New Talent Showcase. Editor Karen Berger called her in for an interview four days after DC received her submission.

Hired by editors Dick Giordano and Karen Berger, Newell wrote fill-in issues for Legion of Super-Heroes and Action Comics. While working as part of the new talent program, Newell became the writer of Wonder Woman. She was the first credited woman to write the Wonder Woman series in an ongoing capacity but was limited in what she could write due to editorial mandates. In 1986, Newell and artist Gray Morrow collaborated on a Lois Lane limited series which dealt with the subject of missing children. In addition, Newell wrote Wonder Woman and Her Sister's Keeper, a seminal Catwoman limited series. Newell also briefly worked on First Comics's American Flagg and Eclipse Comics's The New Wave.

Newell has always maintained a career as a nurse while writing comics, and has since returned to that occupation full-time.

== Personal life ==
Newell is a full-time nurse and mother, while still contributing to comics and other projects. Her former husband, John Higgins, is a British comic book writer, illustrator, and letterer.

== Bibliography ==
=== Writer ===
==== Angry Isis Press ====
- Choices: A Pro-Choice Benefit Comic Anthology for the National Organization for Women #1 (1990)

==== DC Comics ====
- Action Comics (Superman) #566 (1985), (Catwoman) #611–614 (1988)
- Amethyst vol. 2 #12, 15–16, Special #1 (1985–1986)
- Amethyst vol. 3 #1–4 (mini-series, 1987–1988)
- Catwoman #1–4 (mini-series, 1989)
- Green Lantern Corps Annual #2 (1986)
- Heroes Against Hunger #1 (two pages only, 1986)
- Legionnaires 3 #1–4 (with co-author Keith Giffen, pencils by Ernie Colón and inks by Karl Kesel, mini-series, 1986)
- Lois Lane #1–2 (art by Gray Morrow, miniseries) (1986)
- New Talent Showcase #5, 7–11, 13 (1984)
- Tales of the Legion of Super-Heroes #315–317, 320–325 (1984–1985)
- V #7 (1985)
- Wonder Woman #326–328 (1985)
- Wonder Woman vol. 2 #36–46, 49 (1989–1990)

==== Eclipse Comics ====
- Miracleman #8 (The New Wave preview) (1986)
- The New Wave #1–13 (1986–1987)
- The New Wave vs. the Volunteers #1–2 (1987)
- Tales of Terror #3 (1985)

==== First Comics ====
- American Flagg! #46–49 (scripting over Howard Chaykin's plot, 1987)
- American Flagg! vol. 2 #1 (scripting over Howard Chaykin's plot, 1988)

==== IPC Magazines ====
- 2000 AD #1412–1419, with co-author and artist John Higgins (2004)

==== Last Gasp ====
- Strip AIDS U.S.A. #1 (1988)

==== Marvel Comics ====
- Daredevil Annual #10 (1994)
- Daredevil vs. Vapora #1 (1993)
- Marvel Comics Presents #135 (Black Widow) (1993)
- Power Pack Holiday Special #1 (1992)
- Thunderstrike #17 (1995)
- 2099 Special: The World of Doom #1 (1995)

=== Editor ===
==== Marvel Comics ====
- Car Warriors #3–4 (Epic, 1991)
- Deathlok #25–27 (1993)
- The Marvel X-Men Collection #1–3 (1994)

| Preceded by Paul Levitz | Tales of the Legion of Super-Heroes writer 1984–1985 | Succeeded by n/a |
| Preceded by Dan Mishkin | Wonder Woman writer 1985 | Succeeded by Gerry Conway |
| Preceded by George Pérez | Wonder Woman vol. 2 writer 1989–1990 | Succeeded by George Pérez |
