= Acorn Green =

Children's comic book series

Acorn Green was a children's comic book series in the mid-1980s based around a community of woodland creatures, all of whom had different jobs to play in the wood, for instance police officer, nurse, firefighter and postman.

== History ==
Acorn Green first appeared in 1986 in a series of comics, with a range of soft toy figures who came with accessories and clothing following from Tomy. The ethos of the characters was one of caring for our forests and woodlands, and supported the desire of the time for children to have positive, non-violent, creative influences. Each character had their own "special friend" - either a bumblebee, butterfly or ladybird which could take messages throughout the wood, summon for help or run errands. The characters has various adventures and misadventures which involved either a social or environmental issue which was resolved by pulling together and using their resources to stop the bad guys, avert disaster and ultimately to save the forest. The stories promoted the good values of teamwork, care for woodlands and wildlife, and friendship.

Each character had their own job within the wood, as listed below, and varying personalities; from the caring nurse Honey Bunny, friendly Letterbox Bear the postman, wise old Ossie Owl and wacky Flipper Frog the fireman.

The "battlecry" of the characters was "We'll save our woods together, singing Acorn Green Forever!!!!"

== Main characters ==
- Honey Bunny (Nurse)
- Sunshine Squirrel (cook)
- Bobby Badger (Police Officer)
- Ossie Owl (All round leader and wise-man, Know it all owl)
- Big Scout Beaver (Ranger)
- Flipper Frog (Firefighter)
- Scoop Fox (Journalist)
- Letterbox Bear (Postman)
- Patchwork Mouse (Tailor)
- A. Minor Mole (Miner)

== Secondary Characters ==
- Henry Hedgehog
- Holly Hedgehog
- Joker Crow
- Whizzer Crow

== Comics ==
The comic series, by Marvel UK, ran from October 1986 to July 1987 over 36 issues. It contained stories featuring the characters, puzzles, things to do and most importantly, information on wildlife, forestry issues and environmental issues in a way that young children could understand. A preview comic was seen in Get-along Gang issue ##, the week before the first comic was released. When the comic ceased in July 1987, it lived on as a single story feature in the Muppet Babies comic, also by Marvel UK. 2 annuals were also produced, for 1986 and 1987, with a collection of the best stories, puzzles and features.

== Toys ==
A range of soft plush toys were made by Tomy of 6 of the main characters : Letterbox Bear, Honey Bunny, Flipper Frog, Bobby Badger, Sunshine Squirrel and Scoop Fox. Each plush toy came with a reversible outfit which changed from their "work clothes" to casual or sleepwear, an acorn shaped charm containing their "special friend" which could be worn by the child using the plastic chain supplied, and a plaque bearing his or her "Promise" - a rhyme denoting their role in the wood, such as Honey Bunny's "I promise if anything's poorly hurt or ill, I'll make them better, honest i will". Other accessories such as push-and-go tricycles, sleeping bags and tree-stump seats were available separately.

Small 2 inch hard plastic figurines of all of the main characters were also made by Tomy (with ones of Holly Hedgehog, Joker Crow and Whizzer Crow and also associated wind-up toys seen in Tomy Catalogues but never seen in real life). The small figures were designed to fit into the Old Oak Tree House treehouse playset, a tree-shaped set with a movable top half, working lift, furniture and swing.

The toy's boxes were highly decorated with plant life, trees and nature. Many of the packages also carried a token, which could be collected on a collector's card, and sent off to The Conservation Foundation to have a tree planted in a special children's area in Sherwood Forest, Nottinghamshire.

== Other Merchandise ==
As with most comic series, a whole host of other merchandise was created featuring the characters. Lunchboxes, children's clothing and bed linen, storybooks and stationery. A single-sided flexi-disc came with the 1st issue of the comic (and also reportedly with breakfast cereal at one point). The disc featured the song "Acorn Green Forever", which was credited to The Bee Bops and incorporated a spoken section by David Bellamy encouraging respect for the natural environment. The full extent of merchandise available is not known.

== See also ==
- The Get Along Gang - a similar themed series around at the same time, also from Marvel/Tomy.
