= Solson Publications =

Defunct American comic book publishing company

- Founded: 1985
- Founder: Gary Brodsky
- Defunct: 1999
- Headquarters location: Brooklyn, New York
- Key people: Rich Buckler; Albert Occhino
- Publication types: Comics; Books

Solson Publications is a New York-based black-and-white comic book publisher active in the 1980s. The company was founded in 1985 by Gary Brodsky, the son of long-time Marvel Comics executive Sol Brodsky (who had died the year before); the name of the company was derived from Brodsky's name: "Sol's son" = Solson. Solson specialized in low-budget, derivative black-and-white comics designed to capitalize on trends in the direct market, including martial arts and ninja-themed stories. Industry veteran Rich Buckler served as editor, contributing artwork and overseeing production of many of the company’s titles.

The company's first published title was 1985's How to Draw Comics Comic, by Allan J. Fromberg, with art samples by John Byrne and John Romita Jr.. Many of Solson's titles were connected with, or spoofs of, Eastman and Laird's Teenage Mutant Ninja Turtles. One of Solson's most notorious titles was Reagan's Raiders, which featured then-U.S. president Ronald Reagan and members of his cabinet as costumed adventurers in the mold of Nick Fury and his Howling Commandos. The company also published a number of how-to books on various aspects of the comics industry, many featuring art by Buckler. Solson was active in the years 1986–1987 and then went dormant. Some contributors later reported instances of non-payment for completed work.

In 1997, the company re-emerged with a series of how-to books by Gary Brodsky and Albert Occhino, many related to erotic art. The company went defunct again after 1999.

== Titles published: 1980s ==
=== Comics series ===
Cover of Reagan's Raiders#1 (October 1986).

- Amazing Wahzoo
- Blackmoon
- The Bushido Blade of Zatoichi Walrus (2 issues, 1986–1987)
- Codename: Ninja (1987)
- Escape to the Stars vol. 2, #1 (1987)— by Philip Hwang and James E. Lyle; continuing series started in 1983 by Infinity Visual Productions (Memphis, TN) and continued (issue #4, 1985) by Visionary Graphics
- Iron Maidens
- Leonardo, written by Peter Brody, with art by Jason Rodgers, Cathy Orlando, and Rich Buckler (1986)
- Ninjutsu: Art of the Ninja (1986)
- Reagan's Raiders, by Monroe Arnold and Rich Buckler (3 issues, 1986–1987)
- Rock Heads
- Samurai Funnies (2 issues, 1986–1987)
- Santeria: The Religion
- Scream
- Solson Christmas Special: Samurai Santa, written by Philip Clarke Jr., pencils by Don Secrease, and inks by Jim Lee (his professional comics debut) (1986)
- Solson's Comic Talent Starsearch (2 issues, 1986, 1993)
- Sultry Teenage Super-Foxes (1987)
- Those Crazy Peckers
- The Three Stooges
- T.H.U.N.D.E.R. by Michael Sawyer, James Lyle, and Ron Wilber (1987) — a futuristic version of the T.H.U.N.D.E.R. Agents

=== Instructional titles ===
- Buckler, Rich (1986). How to Become A Comic Book Artist. ISBN 978-0961567118. — foreword by Stan Lee
- Buckler, Rich (1987). How to Draw Super-Heroes. ISBN 9780961567156.
- How to Draw Comics Comic, by Allan J. Fromberg with art by John Byrne and John Romita Jr. (1985)
- How to Draw Eastman and Laird's Teenage Mutant Ninja Turtles, by Allan J. Fromberg with art by Kevin Eastman, Peter Laird, and Rich Buckler (1986)
- How to Publish Comics by Gary Brodsky (1987)
- Rich Buckler's Secrets of Drawing Comics (4 issues, 1986–1987)
- Teenage Mutant Ninja Turtles Martial Arts Training Manual by Jason Rodgers & Rich Buckler; edited by Peter Brody (6 issues, 1986–1987)
- Teenage Mutant Ninja Turtles Teach Karate (2 issues, 1987)

== Titles published: 1990s ==
=== Comics series ===
- The Best of Nightmare and Psycho (2 issues, 1999)

=== Gary and Al Present series ===
By Gary Brodsky and Albert Occhino unless otherwise noted.

- The Art of Drawing Animania (1999)
- The Fine Art of Drawing Pornography by (1999)
- How to Draw Adult Anime (1998)
- How to Draw Aliens (1998)
- How to Draw Erotic Art (1998) ISBN 978-1556015915
- How to Draw Erotic Witches and Vampy Vampires
- How to Draw Fantasy Art (1998)
- How to Draw Fetish Art: the Ultimate In Sensuality (1999)
- How to Draw Girls in Every Style (1999)
- How to Draw Halloween Girls, by Gary Brodsky and Albert Occhino, with art by Rich Buckler (1998)
- How to Draw Heads Every Which Way (1998)
- How to Draw Heavenly Bodies (1998)
- How to Draw Robots, Cyborgs & Androids by Albert Brodsky, Gary Brodsky, and Albert Occhino (1999)
- How to Draw Sexy Women, by Gary Brodsky, Naser Subashi, Susan Van Der Veer, Emiel Maas, Gus Vazquez, Steve Ellis, and Louis Small, Jr. (1997) ISBN 978-1549595493
- How to Draw Sexy Women: The Comic (1998)
- How to Draw Spaceships and Futuristic Stuff (1998)
