= Barbara Slate =

American comic book creator (born 1947)

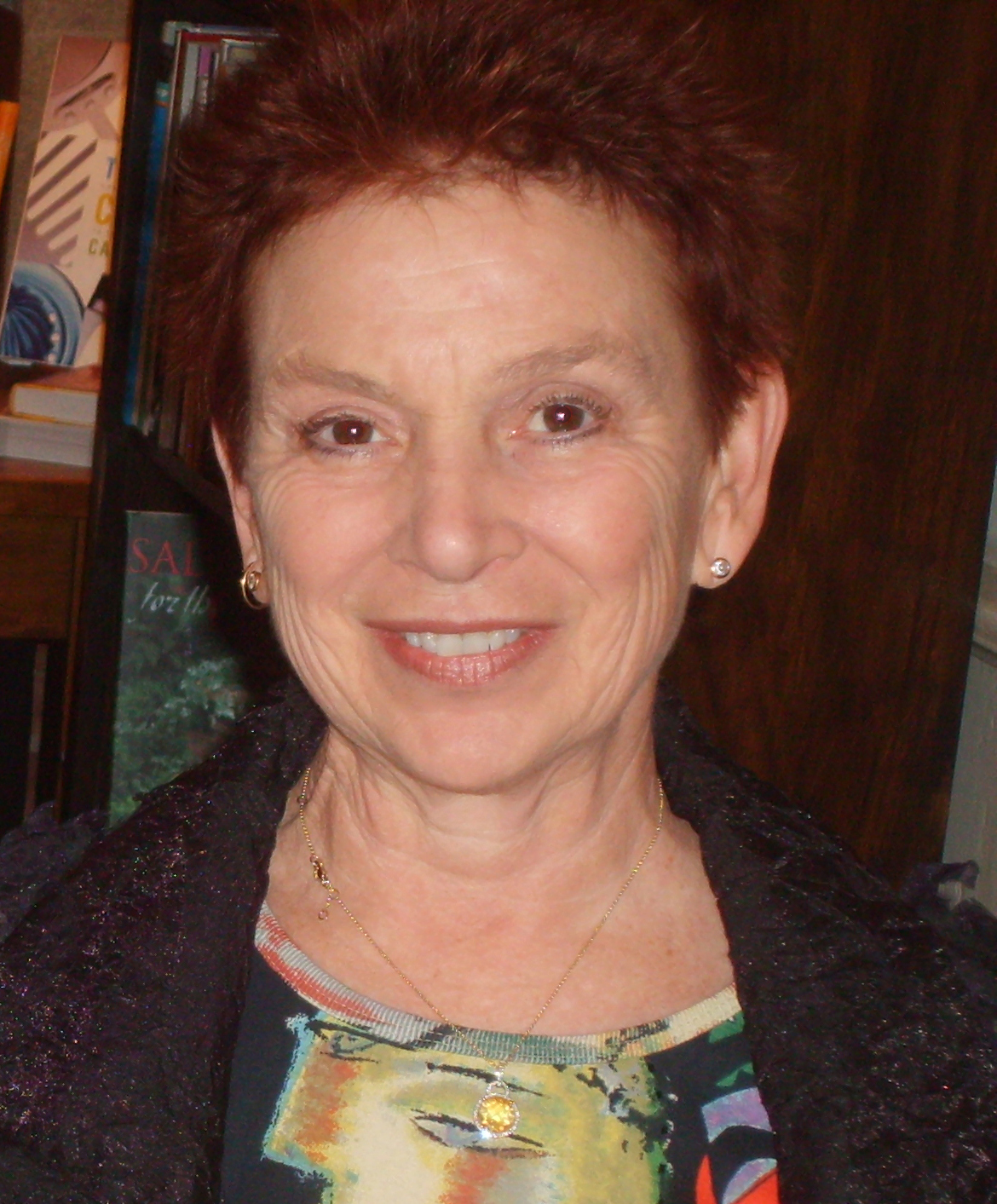
- Barbara Slate in 2010
- Born: May 9, 1947 (age 79)
- Education: The Art Institute of Pittsburgh
- Occupations: Creator, writer, artist, teacher
- Years active: 1975–present
- Notable work: Getting Married and Other Mistakes, You Can Do a Graphic Novel (Britannica eBook), You Can Do a Graphic Novel Teacher's Guide (Britannica eBook), Yuppies from Hell, Angel Love, Ms. Liz, Sweet XVI
- Awards: ComicBookResources Barbara Slate Week, Parent's Choice Award for the writing of Barbie and Barbie Fashion comic books, Forbie Award for Sweet XVI from Marvel Comics Time Out Magazine, London, England recommendation of Angel Love as "TOP 10 Comic", Cosmopolitan Magazine "Career Woman of the Month"
- Website: barbaraslate.com

Barbara Slate (born May 9, 1947) is an American artist, cartoonist, graphic novelist, comic book creator, and writer. She is one of the few female artists who has created, written, and drawn comics for both DC and Marvel Comics. Her textbook, You Can Do a Graphic Novel, was first published in 2010 by Alpha Books (Penguin/Putnam). In 1986 Barbara created Angel Love for DC Comics, an adult-themed series for teenagers. In an exhibition review, The New York Times described her art as "emphatically of our time with its narrative of passion, gun violence, and female assertiveness."

== Career ==
=== Early work ===
In 1974, Slate's feminist cartoon character, Ms. Liz, appeared on millions of greeting cards, in a regular comic strip in Cosmopolitan magazine, and as the star in a series of animated segments on NBC's Today show in 1982. Many magazines and newspapers published extensive articles about Barbara Slate and Ms. Liz. Slate was interviewed about Ms. Liz for a seven-page feature in Cartoonist Profiles in 1983.

=== Comics ===
Comic Book Resources began Barbara Slate Week May 13, 2013, with a column about Angel Love. For Marvel Comics she created, wrote, and drew Sweet XVI, wrote 65 Barbie and Barbie Fashion comics and put her own spin on the Disney films Beauty and the Beast and Pocahontas. She also wrote and did the layout for the comic New Kids on the Block for Harvey Comics and Scooby Doo for DC Comics. Barbara wrote over one hundred Betty and Veronica stories for Archie Comics throughout the 1990s and 2000s.

=== Comic strips ===
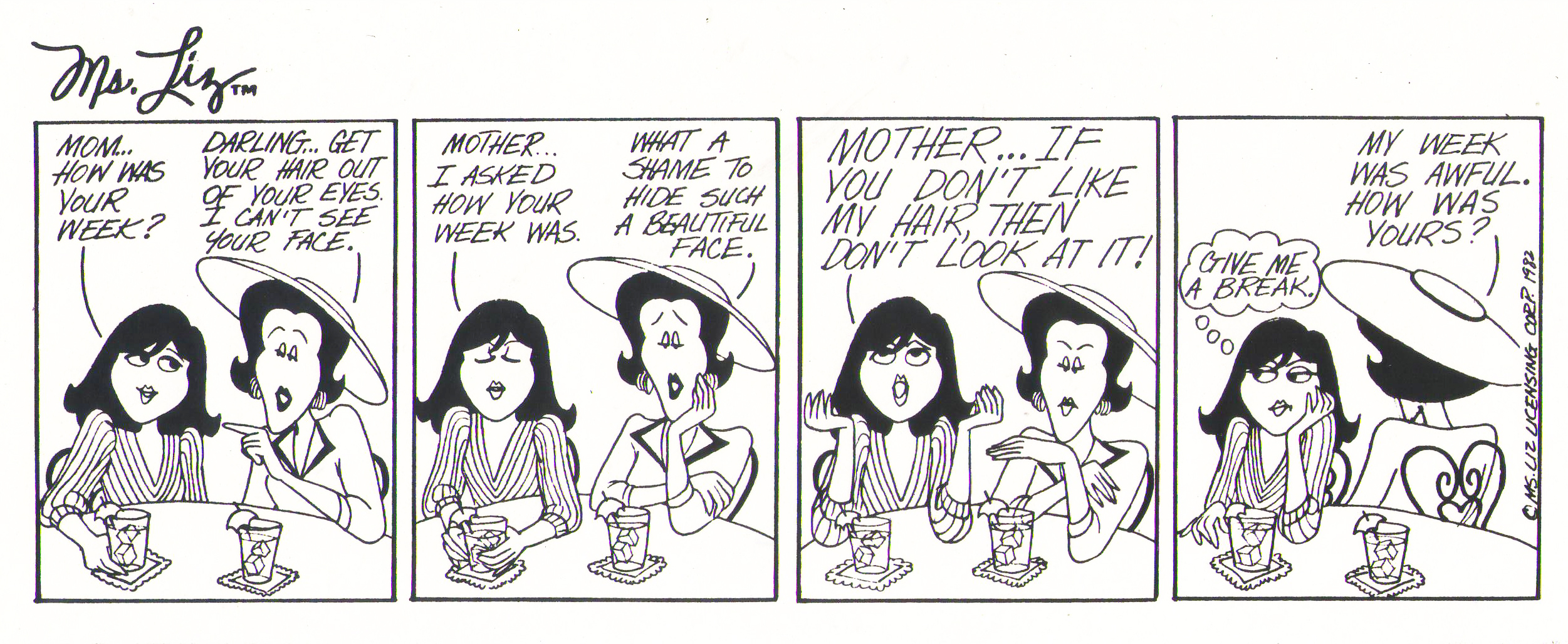
1980s: Ms. Liz was featured in Cosmopolitan, Working Woman, SELF, and New Woman

1989-90: Yuppies From Hell (Marvel Comics) was excerpted in Cosmopolitan

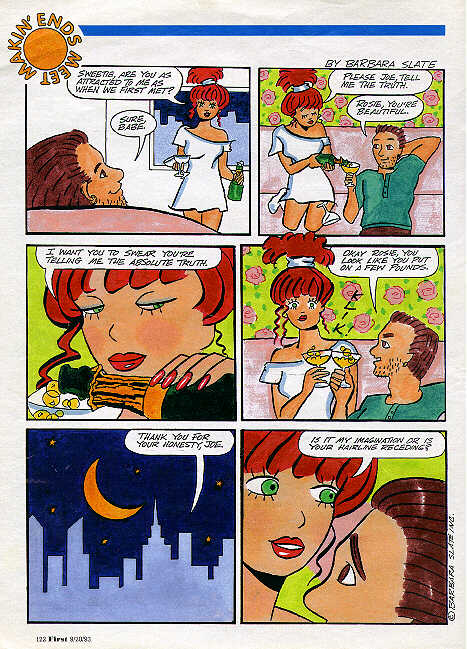
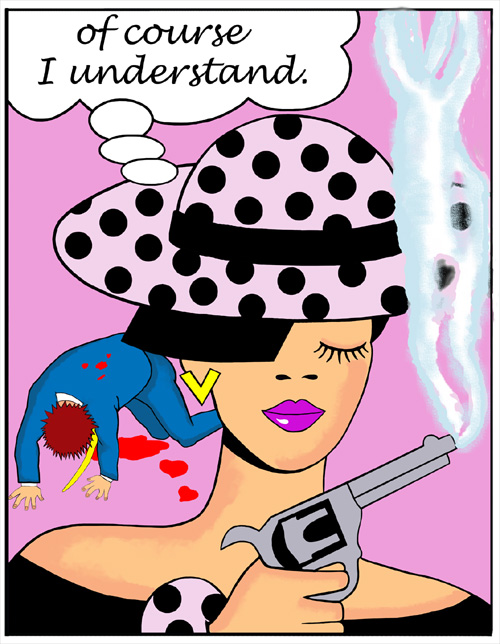
1993-94: Makin' Ends Meet appeared in First for Women magazine; 1995: Violet appeared in International magazine

1998: Spinville appeared in React Magazine
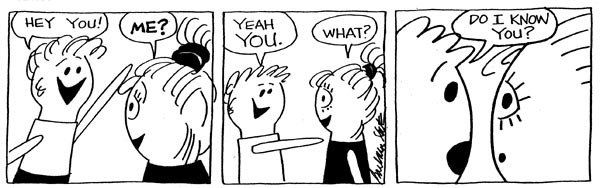

=== Columns ===
2008-2010: You Can Do A Graphic Novel] in Archie Digests, The Independent Newspaper, The Columbia Newspaper

2009: "I Got Married and Other Mistakes" in The Columbia Newspaper

=== Graphic novels ===
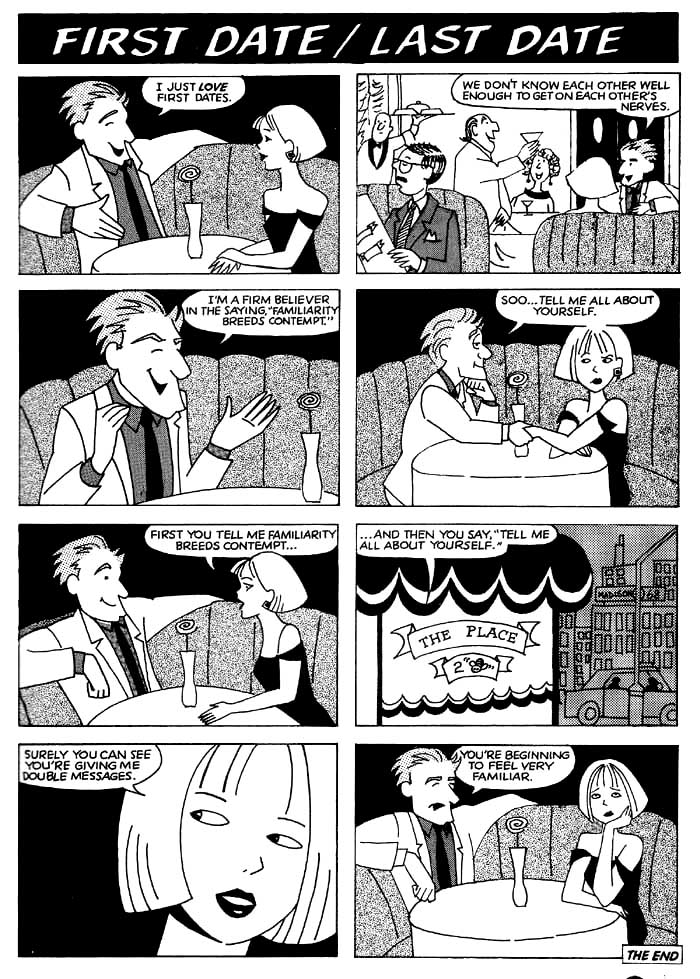
In 1989, Barbara's first graphic novel, Yuppies From Hell, was published by Marvel Comics. The 3 part novel was described as "a mixture of one-off satirical examinations of life among the world of young urban professionals (“yuppies”) and a few characters who we follow throughout the book as they make their way through the world." Comic Book Resources declared the week of May 13th, 2013, to be "Barbara Slate Week]." Brian Cronin writes that Slate "uses a 'soap opera' style to add a nice level of faux drama to the life of yuppies that works really well as a statement of the absurdity of it all."

In 2012, Other Press published Getting Married and Other Mistakes. Jo is a successful wedding photographer who had followed her mother's advice to snag a husband. After nine years of an unblissful marriage she is dumped for another woman and desperately needs to get on with her life. She realizes that her Mr. Right was actually Mr. Wrong and that she was living her life according to everyone's rules but her own. The graphic novel delves into Jo's struggle with female guilt and her quest for self-awareness.

Getting Married and Other Mistakes was featured May 17, 2013, as the final segment of Barbara Slate Week by Comic Book Resources.

=== Teaching ===
Barbara Slate travels nationwide as a keynote speaker, teacher, moderator and panelist. She teaches kids, teens, and adults how to do graphic novels at schools, libraries, and art centers nationwide, and is an instructor at The Cooper Union in New York City.

In 2010, Pearson (Penuin/Alpha) published Slate's textbook, You Can Do a Graphic Novel. Tom DeFalco, editor-in-chief of Marvel Comics from 1987 to 1995, wrote the foreword for YCDAGN.
YCDAGN was endorsed by Stan Lee, "...if anyone can bring out the writer and artist hidden within society's somnambulant psyche it's the titanically talented Barbara Slate. So please don't read this book. I have a family to support!"
A Teacher's Guide is used with this book at all levels of classroom education.

=== Books ===
In the late 1990s, Slate wrote four Barbie Golden books, all published by Western Publishing Company. In 1992 Slate wroteThe Big Splash, in '93 Very Busy Barbie, in '94 Hi, My Name is Barbie, and '95 was Soccer Coach. In 2002, she wrote and drew The Shelby Care and Training Guide, published by Scholastic. She did the layout and illustrated "Truly Mars & Venus" by John Gray in 2003, published by Harper-Collins in many languages.

She is profiled in the seminal work A Century of Women Cartoonists.
