= Broadsides (video game) =

1983 video game

- Developer: Strategic Simulations
- Publisher: Strategic Simulations
- Designer: Wayne Garris
- Platforms: Apple II, Atari 8-bit, Commodore 64
- Release: 1983
- Genre: Naval warfare
- Mode: Single-player

Broadsides is a video game that simulates naval combat in the Age of Sail. It was published by Strategic Simulations in 1983 for the Atari 8-bit computers, Apple II, and Commodore 64.

== Gameplay ==
Gameplay screenshot (Atari 8-bit)

Giant warships circle each other, waiting for the best time to unleash a broadside upon the enemy. Cannons can be loaded with various types of ordnance; cannonballs to destroy the hull, chain shot to destroy the sails, and grapeshot to kill the enemy crew.

The player can also close with the enemy ship and attempt boarding. This aspect of the game plays a lot like rock-paper-scissors, where the player controls one crew member and which sort of attack he makes with his sword. This is compared against the enemy attack, and the results are used to decrease the crew count on one side. Once one side's crew is all dead, the other side is the victor.

The game also offers a simplified, arcade-combat mode in which the player fights an endless number of enemy ships.

== Reception ==
Computer Gaming World in 1983 stated that Broadsides "is an excellent depiction of ship-to-ship combat". It cited the "superb" combat display, good graphics, user-designed scenarios, and the choice of tactical or arcade combat as highlights. In 1990 the magazine gave the game five out of five stars, stating that it had "vast entertainment value" and "remains the standard". In 1993 the magazine gave it three-plus stars, stating that "it remains the standard ... this writer still plays it on an Atari 800". While noting the incomplete simulation of tacking, Antic in 1985 described the game as "a realistic and playable simulation" of a two-ship duel, praising the "superb graphics". The magazine concluded, "I recommend Broadsides to any computer gamer".
