= Broadside (comic strip) =

American comic strip by Jeff Bacon

Broadside is a weekly, single-panel comic published in Navy Times from 1986 until March 2020, and written by Jeff Bacon. The humor is very specifically directed at United States Navy personnel, and considered nearly incomprehensible by many non-Navy servicepersons. Bacon also drew a second cartoon called Greenside, featuring United States Marine Corps personnel. Broadside continues to be published online.

Broadside cartoons have been printed in numerous government publications, professional papers, and often can be seen adorning the walls of military spaces and cubicles. The cartoons have been displayed at the Navy Art Gallery and the Navy Memorial in Washington, D.C., and have been published in four books: The Best of Broadside, Book II: the Rest of Broadside, and 20 Years of Broadside, and Underway with Broadside.
